= Ioannites =

Ioannites, Johannites or Johanniter may refer to:

- Ioannite sect of Russian Orthodox Church
- another name for Knights Hospitaller
- (members of the) Order of Saint John (disambiguation)
  - Order of Saint John (chartered 1888)
  - Order of Saint John (Bailiwick of Brandenburg)
  - Johanniter International
  - Johanniter-Unfall-Hilfe, humanitarian organization for emergency health care
  - St John Ambulance
- Citizens of Ioannina
- Johannite Church
- Johanniter (grapes), Czech grape variety

== See also ==
- Johannine (disambiguation)
