= Paramedics in Germany =

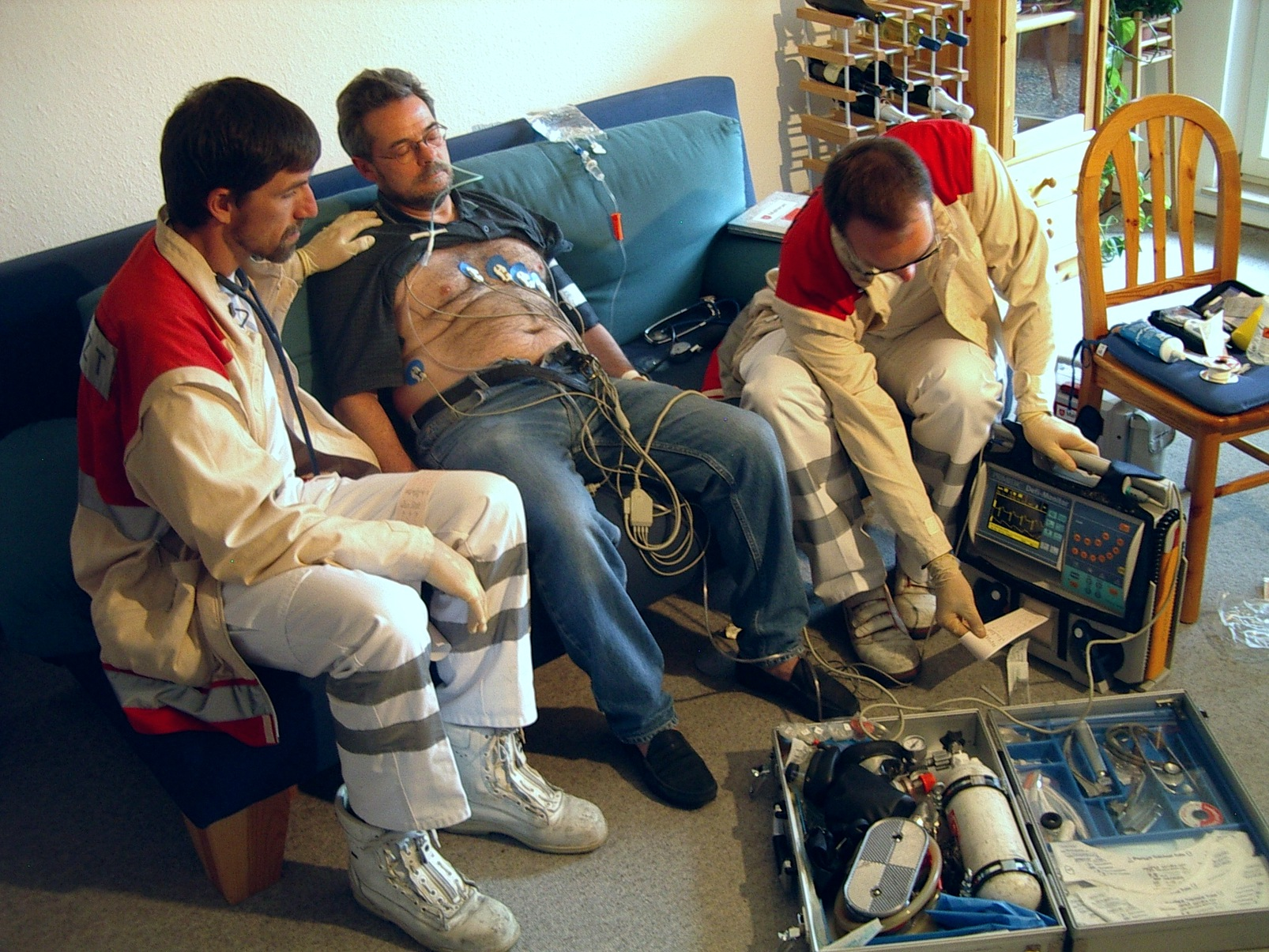
German paramedic (right) and prehospital physician (left) assess a patient.

Paramedics in Germany are the main providers of emergency care in emergency medical services in Germany. There exist two professional levels regulated by federal law, the Rettungsassistent (two year education, effective 1989 until 2013) and the Notfallsanitäter (three year education, starting 2014).

Both are able to provide the first level of pre-hospital emergency care. Additionally, they can get backup by an emergency physician on scene. Thus the German paramedic scope of skills include a set of advanced life support (ALS) treatments, which they have to perform until an emergency doctor is on scene. Then the paramedics (and other medical staff on scene) act under direct medical supervision of the physician.

Non life-threatening emergencies are handled solely by the paramedic ambulances without a physician on scene.

Other regulated qualifications in German EMS are Notarzt (emergency physician) and the more basic emergency technician level Rettungssanitäter.

== History ==
The development of ambulance services in Germany started in the late 19th century. Typically volunteer aid organizations, some private companies in larger cities and so called rescue corps provided ambulance services mostly with very little training or medical background. This more or less lasted until the 1960s: emergency care was provided by volunteer organizations or untrained "ambulance men".

In the late 1960s and early 1970s, however, it became obvious, that a more professional approach is needed. The sending of physicians to the scene was introduced, following the concept "bringing the doctor to the patient, not the patient to the doctor". The development of the system "emergency physician" (Notarzt) started, bearing the need for somewhat qualified assistance on scene. A law to establish the occupation of Rettungssanitäter has been discussed, with a 3-year training curriculum. The government however saw difficulties in financing the training of this new profession. So, eventually in 1977 the original idea was introduced as a 3.5 month (520 hours) training curriculum common to all Länder (federal states) of Germany. This led to a more professionalized approach, but clearly below the level of the intended original law. By the 1980s it became clear that many situations were occurring in which the knowledge level of the Rettungssanitäter was inadequate, especially in cases where a Notarzt wasn't available in time. The developing of pre-clinical procedures demanded additional qualification for treating patients in the field. It was deemed necessary to find a new profession with even more knowledge and skills.

This was when, in 1989, the profession of the Rettungsassistent was created, introducing a two-year education program. In contrast to the Rettungssanitäter, the Rettungsassistent was a state-certified profession with a job title protected by law. Since then, EMS in Germany has evolved into a formal, well organized structure, with standards for staff training, vehicles, and service delivery. Formerly Rettungssanitäter trained providers could get an upgrade to the new profession with proof of 2000 hours experience in EMS. The Rettungssanitäter still exists as a common entry/assistance level for EMS, for volunteer work and industrial emergency medicine.

However, the Rettungsassistent remained subject to discussion, especially regarding length of education, scope of practice, autonomy in emergency situations and differentation to other medical professions, including paygrade. The problems mainly were seen in the early state exam after just one year in EMS school (the additional internship in EMS wasn't part of examination), the more or less undefined curriculum, the main focus on bare assistance to a physician, the possible side entry for other medical professions and the de facto requirement for students to pay for the entire education.

Around 20 years after the introduction of Rettungsassistent law, the German EMS community targeted to an enhanced qualification. Eventually in the year 2013, the law about the Notfallsanitäter came into effect. With January 2014, no more starting courses for the old Rettungsassistent were possible. The Notfallsanitäter law addressed much of the concerns, thus providing a real three year education with a well defined curriculum targeted more on autonomous handling of emergency situations, requirement of a (paid) contract with an employer during education and no side entries for other professions. Former Rettungsassistenten can decide to stay in their duty (the title still is protected) or (time limited until end of 2020) upgrade to Notfallsanitäter by taking courses and a supplemental state exam.

== Scope of practice ==
The scope of practice of a German paramedic is not specifically defined by a decent law. Thus the allowed standard procedures largely depend on the local medical director and the employer. However, in life-threatening situations, a Rettungsassistent or Notfallsanitäter always has to perform autonomously first diagnosis/monitoring and all necessary ALS treatments until an emergency physician arrives. This includes airway management (clearing airway and oropharyngeal, subglottic and endotracheal intubation), intravenous cannulation or intraosseous infusion, decompression of tension pneumothorax and application of crystalloid solutions, certain medications (e.g. adrenaline, glucose, inhaled ß2 agonists/bronchodilators, benzodiazepines, aspirin, naloxone, analgetics) and resuscitation including manual defibrillation.

Usually not included are rapid sequence induction, surgical airway management, thoracostomy and advanced medication. However, this may be trained and allowed, especially for special settings, such as military or remote medical care (i.e. on ships).

Restrictions in treatment are the scope of training and practice, some laws restricting decent methods to physicians (i.e. medication with specific controlled substances such as opioids) and the fact that concluding therapies are restricted to physicians and licensed practitioners only, with exceptions to certain emergency procedures opened to the Notfallsanitäter. An emergency physician should be called to scene if they can perform other life saving tasks the patient needs, usually regulated by a physicians indication catalogue ("Notarzt-Indikationskatalog") depending on the service and state.

The definition of skills in the Rettungsassistent education law was not very specific, whereas the definition in the Notfallsanitäter law is very specific in which skills have to be mastered, trained or only known of. Thus, the scope of practice of a Notfallsanitäter is based on a well defined education, which leads to a wider range of accepted standard procedures, including intraosseous access, extraglottic airway, thorax punction, manual defibrillation and cardioversion, external pacing, as well as more drugs including opiates.

=== Algorithms, Standing Orders, Procedures and Guidelines ===
Beside specific topics such as resuscitation, the use of algorithms in daily work is not usual in German EMS, although they are used in training.

Standing orders, pre-delegated authority and telemetry consultation are becoming more common since introduction of the Notfallsanitäter. In cases not covered by pre-delegation, emergency physicians can be called to come directly on scene. Until then, the paramedic is allowed to perform needed procedures within their skills on their own. Telemetry is mainly used to provide the receiving hospital with data for organising appropriate help in-house, but also in a few areas to seek medical advice with a telemetry emergency physician via video and audio transmission .

Essentially, emergency medicine in Germany heavily relies on evidence based guidelines provided by the main bodies of medical scientific organisations. Providers of (emergency) medicine have to keep up with the changes in those guidelines.

=== Competences ===
The theoretical education for German paramedics include:

- basic anatomy, physiology and body functions
- internal medicine
- neurology
- gynaecology
- urology
- paediatrics
- disease patterns of the above
- traumatological injuries
- pharmacology
- law, rights and duties
- social skills
- emergency equipment, tactics and procedures

Furthermore, the student is taught skills in treating patients, including:

- basic diagnostic skills (blood pressure, heartrate, glucose level, oxygen saturation, Capnography)
- advanced diagnostic skills (using and interpreting ECG, auscultation, neurological examination)
- application of volume and drugs
- airway management and ventilation
- treatment of internal diseases like myocardial infarction, pulmonary edema, hypertension
- treatment of traumatic injuries like fractures, amputations, cuts and bruises
- communication, special tactics

== Rettungsassistent ==
The Rettungsassistent (female: Rettungsassistentin) was a two-year education program, established in 1989. This program ended in the year 2013 with the introduction of the three year education program of the Notfallsanitäter (see below).

Literally, the term means "rescue assistant", meaning that those in this role assist the Notarzt during pre-hospital treatment.

The Notfallsanitäter law of 2013 outdated the Rettungsassistent, effective with beginning of 2014. The title Rettungsassistent still is protected by law and those who have this education can perform their duty, but there will be no more starting classes for Rettungsassistent since January 2014.

=== Access ===
To be allowed to start EMS school an applicant had to be 18 years old and generally healthy. The needed school education was a basic level certificate of secondary education (Hauptschulabschluss) or similar, or alternatively completion of vocational training.

Specific side entries with shortened courses were defined for applicants with existing Rettungssanitäter education, nurses, active soldiers and police officers with medical training. Another professional education could have been accredited by authorities in general.

=== Education ===
The first phase of education included classroom and hospital clinical. It took 1200 hours, this is about one year full-time. A state licensed examination after this first stage permitted the candidate to begin a 1600 hours preceptorship in the pre-hospital setting.

In this second year they usually started as a third person on a transport ambulance in order to observe and learn from the trained professionals. Sometimes, paramedic students who also had the qualification of Rettungssanitäter were used as a full crew member on a two-person team. However, at all times the student was under supervision by a Lehrrettungsassistent.

After completing their year of internship, there was a closing meeting with the training physician and the supervising paramedic. After that, should the student have been deemed fit, he or she was awarded the vocational title of Rettungsassistent (female: Rettungsassistentin). The certificate then was issued by the state Ministry of Health and valid nationwide.

==== Objectives ====
The objectives of education was defined as being able to perform life saving action to emergency patients on scene until a physician takes over, establish transportability of such patients, monitor and support vital body functions during transportation to a hospital and transport ill, injured or other needy persons - even if non-emergency patients - with appropriate care. The description of the scope in the law largely placed emphasis on the assistance to a physician. By law the education has to enable the Notfallsanitäter to perform following tasks on their own: scene assessment and security, assessment of patients especially detecting vital threats, decision about calling in assistance, medical treatment of patients including invasive actions, handling of people in crisis situations, establishing and securing transportability of patients, selection of an appropriate transportation target, monitoring, reporting to receiving facility, documentation, communication, quality management, operational responsibilities for equipment including care for hygiene and accident prevention, assisting in medical treatments under supervision of a physician, independent treatment as ordered by a physician, self-responsible medical treatment according to rules given by a medical director, cooperation with other professions.[26]

==== Schools, costs ====
Education as Rettungsassistent was mostly offered by privately owned but state certified EMS schools (Rettungsassistenten-Schule). Mostly the students had to pay for their own training, rarely a future employer paid. Usual exceptions were firefighters, policemen and members of the armed forces for whom their employer covered the fees. Costs depended on school, they varied around €4000 for a full course. With a pre-existing EMS training, a shortened course was available, for fees of about €2750. Side entry for nurses were possible, omitting several medical topics, remaining fees of about €1800. Public funding and sponsorship were possible in certain cases.

== Notfallsanitäter ==
The Notfallsanitäter (female: Notfallsanitäterin) is a three-year education program, established since January 2014.

Literally, the term means "emergency medic", underlining the more advanced skills for pre-hospital emergency medicine.

=== Access ===
To be allowed to start EMS school an applicant has to be generally healthy. The needed school education is a higher level certificate of secondary education (Mittlere Reife), or alternatively a basic level certificate of secondary education (Hauptschulabschluss) with an additional vocational training of at least two years.

University based programs may exist, then a secondary education certification for university entrance (Abitur) is needed.

The applicant has to get contracted (and paid) by an employer during their apprenticeship. The employer then organizes the education together with an EMS school.

Since it is mandatory to have a contract during the education period there is almost no way to get the Notfallsanitäter qualification on own expenses, only exception would be for university students in emergency related degree programs (and, technically, for public servants, i.e. career fire fighters or police officers).

There is no defined side entry for other medical professions, only a general rule for authorities enabling them accreditation of other education.

A time limited transition rule for holders of the outdated Rettungsassistent certification was valid until the end of the year 2023. It required mandatory courses dependent on time of work experience and a supplemental state exam, alternative attending the full state exam for Notfallsanitäter.

=== Education ===
The three year education of the Notfallsanitäter consists of min. 1920 hours theoretical and practical classroom instruction, an EMS internship of min. 1960 hours and an hospital internship of min. 720 hours, followed by a state exam. The EMS school, EMS station (internship) and training hospital has to be officially recognised.

==== Objectives ====
Generally, the law gives following objectives for the education: A Notfallsanitäter has to be qualified to perform according to scientific standards and with technical, personal, social and methodic competence for sole responsibility and team oriented work especially in emergency medical treatment and transport of patients. By law the education has to enable the Notfallsanitäter to perform following tasks on their own: scene assessment and security, assessment of patients especially detecting vital threats, decision about calling in assistance, handling of people in crisis situations, establishing and securing transportability of patients, selection of an appropriate transportation target, monitoring, reporting to receiving facility, documentation, communication, quality management, operational responsibilities for equipment including care for hygiene and accident prevention, assisting in medical treatments under supervision of a physician, independent treatment as ordered by a physician, self-responsible medical treatment according to rules given by a medical director, cooperation with other professions. Especially defined is the task of medical treatment of patients including all curative and invasive actions, which he is allowed to perform till the physician-contact on their own decision and responsibility, if he was schooled in the certain action and still overrule it and the certain action is necessary to provide the patient from further harm.

The educational guidelines to reach these competences are described in the according federal regulation for education and examination, Ausbildungs- und Prüfungsverordnung für Notfallsanitäterinnen und Notfallsanitäter (NotSan-APrV).

== Other qualifications ==
See also article "Emergency medical services in Germany".

=== Notarzt ===
Other qualifications in EMS include the Emergency Physician (Notarzt), providing medical direction to all subordinate EMS staff, once on scene. If needed, emergency physicians are dispatched along with a paramedic ambulance according to several standard dispatch criteria (indication catalogue, "Notarzt-Indikationskatalog").

=== Rettungssanitäter and Rettungshelfer ===
Other level qualifications enabling a person to work in EMS are the Rettungssanitäter (EMT with 520 hour training) and Rettungshelfer (BLS and driver, not standardized, around 240 hours out of the Rettungssanitäter curriculum).

=== Sanitäter ===
Sanitäter technically is a person just with advanced first aid training (40-70 hrs) according to organization or company regulations, often staffing the first aid posts at events, volunteering in local first responder units or assisting in disaster response, nowadays rarely as crew member (driver) of an ambulance.

However, it is also the general public's term for "medical ambulance staff" in Germany, although recognized a bit offensive by some EMS professionals.

== Continuous Education ==
After successfully completing EMS education and holding the state exam, paramedics in Germany do not need to be recertified. However, most German states and/or some employers require yearly training for serving in professional EMS: mostly around 30 hours.

Additionally, special recertification requirements exists for courses like ACLS, PALS, ITLS and PHTLS which are increasingly required by employers within the EMS system.

== Work as a paramedic in Germany ==
Typically, paramedics are responsible for patient care on EMS ambulances. He or she may also act as assistant/driver for the car of an emergency physician (Notarzt).

Paramedic work includes positions in industry and occupational health.

Additionally to their regular field job, paramedics in Germany can obtain positions as QM-Beauftragter (quality management representative), MPG-Beauftragter (medical equipment representative) and Hygiene-Beauftragter (hygiene representative), which are administrative roles, often required by laws and regulations to be fulfilled in EMS organizations.

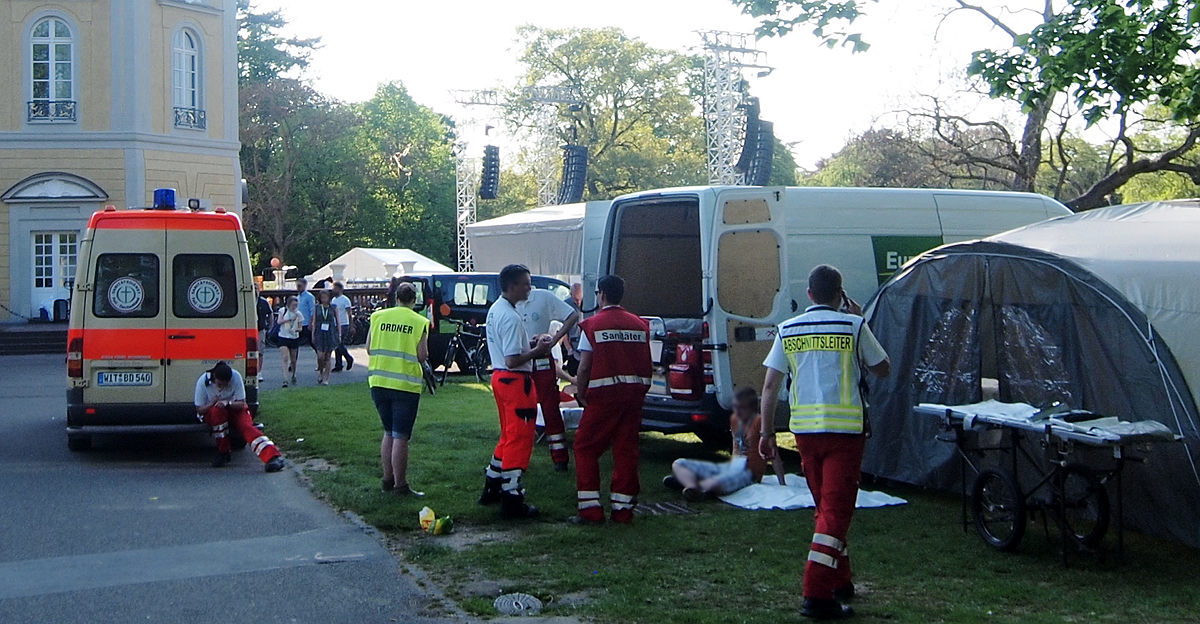
Paramedics volunteering in first aid service at an outdoor convention

Real career steps are Wachleiter (station commander), Schichtleiter (shift commander) and Rettungsdienstleiter (EMS chief). Those require experience in the EMS field and additional administrative skills, often regulated by state laws.

Another speciality is the HEMS crew member training, after which the Rettungsassistent or Notfallsanitäter is certified to work on a rescue helicopter. This role includes assisting both the pilot (i.e. navigating, spotting landing sites) during flight, and assisting the emergency physician with medical care.

The qualification of Lehrrettungsassistent or Praxisanleiter Rettungsdienst is to teach and supervise paramedic students during their training. Those seeking this role receive special training in which they learn education theory and the use of teaching strategies.

The qualification of Einsatzleiter Rettungsdienst and Organisatorischer Leiter (EMS/incident commander) is closely related to mass casualties and will be responsible for organizing staging, triage, treatment and transport as well as communication. Often that is a part-time position for paramedics beside their usual shifts.

A Leitstellendisponent works in a dispatch center. Part of their education is obtaining a medical level plus additional skills (i.e. firefighting, communications).

Often, hospitals seek paramedics for the position as Emergency Room Specialist, performing their skills in emergency medicine and triage within a hospital setting.

Furthermore, university degrees like Bachelor and Master Programs in Rescue Engineering or Health Care Management offer opportunities for German paramedics to take leadership roles in emergency health care systems and the general health care field.

Marketing and sales positions as well as working in technical service or development for manufacturers of medical equipment could be an additional career move for paramedics.

== Salary ==
Wages depends on the employer, the state, involved unions and the role and/or additional tasks. Nowadays, pay level could be more or less compared with that of a nurse. A typical median pay for a paramedic is around €53,000 per year (before taxes). Additional income can be gained for shift work and assuming additional tasks. Usually, pay level ascends with seniority and experience.

Since the education level of Rettungsassistent could be obtained by own expenses, the working market was very employer friendly. With the new Notfallsanitäter system, the number of paramedics in the system is restricted to a smaller number of paid and employed apprentices finishing their education. So a more employee friendly work market could be expected, influencing the pay grade in a positive way.

On the other hand, the general structure of German EMS is changing within the European union, more and more towards a time restricted contracting system, leading to heavy competition between organizations and companies. This may have a depressing influence on significant cost factors such as employees and their wages.

== See also ==
- Paramedics
- Ambulance
- Emergency medical services
- Emergency medical services in Germany
