= Emergency medical services in Germany =

Emergency Medical Service (German: Rettungsdienst, lit. 'Rescue Service') in Germany is a service of public pre-hospital emergency healthcare, including ambulance service, provided by individual German cities and counties. It is primarily financed by the German public health insurance system.

== History ==
The development of ambulance services in Germany started in the late 19th century. Typically volunteer aid organizations, some private companies in larger cities and so called rescue corps provided ambulance services mostly with very little training or medical background. After World War II, prehospital care in Germany was in its infancy; in most predominantly rural areas the German Red Cross provided an ambulance service. In West Germany the fire departments provided 24/7 service as a professional service in some cities and urban centres or towns. With the increase in individual motorized traffic at the beginning of the 1950s, road accidents also increased, leading to greater numbers of both injuries and fatalities. This encouraged the formation of several other emergency services, for example the Johanniter-Unfall-Hilfe e.V., a subsidiary of the German Order of St. John. Still, the EMS role was primarily done on a voluntary basis by individuals with only minimal training in emergency health care, using simple transport vehicles with almost no medical equipment. However, more and more it became evident, that not only transport saves live of patients, but treating them on-scene.

The need to professionalize emergency health care was picked up by several university medical centers in the late 1950s and 60s (Cologne, Frankfurt, Heidelberg and Munich). The idea to "bring the doctor to the patient, rather than the patient to the doctor" was already born before World War II, now rediscovered mid-1960s. The result was the evolution of a type of emergency physician called a Notarzt who dealt primarily with providing emergency medical care in the out-of-hospital setting. The service delivery model that this approach describes is commonly referred to as the Franco-German model.

In the late 1960s and early 1970s, advanced demands lead to the establishment of helicopter ambulance services, dispatch centers, radio communication and general better organization of EMS as well as scientific approaches to provide better emergency care. The first emergency medical technicians were trained by some fire departments, organizations, and even universities. In 1977 the first nationwide educational standard for non-physician emergency medical providers was introduced, the Rettungssanitäter.

The system was largely improved in the 1980s and 1990s, leading not only to the then-new profession of Rettungsassistent (1989) but also to the availability of modern medical equipment in outdoor quality. In the year 2015 the new occupation of Notfallsanitäter was introduced, including a three-year education and training for the role as high professional emergency care provider as well as a substantial assistant to the emergency physician on scene.

Today Germany has a dense net of emergency services available, providing emergency care at a high professional standard.

== Organisation ==
=== Responsibility ===
In Germany the individual states are legally responsible for the provision of emergency services, but typically delegate these responsibilities to the district level ("Kreis" or "kreisfreie Stadt"). Municipalities, including both smaller communities ("Gemeinden") and cities ("Städte") are given responsibility by the state for equipping and operating fire departments ("Feuerwehr"), Emergency Medical Systems ("Rettungsdienst") and disaster response ("Katastrophenschutz"). German law mandates the provision of fire and rescue services, including EMS, staffing and equipping according to levels which correspond to local population. In independent cities, this is usually provided directly by the Fire Prevention Bureau ("Amt für Brand- und Katastrophenschutz").

Unlike fire protection, the task of providing EMS, while legally mandated, is not necessarily performed directly by the district. If it is, it will be operated as a "kommunaler Rettungsdienst" ("County EMS"). In some cases, local municipalities will provide the service directly, usually through a full-time staffed fire department. EMS may, however, be contracted out by the district to a number of other potential service providers, including both community non-profit organizations and privately owned companies.

Thus, EMS in Germany may be provided by any of the following:

- The local fire department
- The joint medical services of the German Bundeswehr (Army)
- The county EMS agency
- The "Johanniter-Unfall-Hilfe" (abbr. JUH, the German counterpart to St. John Ambulance)
- The "Malteser Hilfsdienst" (abbr. MHD, the German counterpart to Order of Malta Ambulance Corps)
- The "Deutsches Rotes Kreuz" (abbr. DRK, the German national Red Cross Society)
- The "Deutsche Lebens-Rettungs-Gesellschaft" (abbr. DLRG, lit. "German lifesaving foundation", primarily for providing water rescue)
- The "Arbeiter-Samariter-Bund" (abbr. ASB, Labor-Samaritan-Alliance, part of the European "Samaritan International (SAINT)")
- Privately owned companies

=== Leadership ===
In Germany, EMS is a component of one of the key tasks (public safety) which every municipal government is required by law to perform. As a result, there are strict regulations regarding qualifications, job performance, EMS system performance including response time, and the types of vehicles and equipment required. Compliance with those regulations is usually evaluated with respect to effectiveness and meeting public need by the local cities/communities, assisted by specialised physicians.

Typically, community or service area ("Rettungsdienstbereich") employs a medical director, (Ärztlicher Leiter Rettungsdienst), with a role that is similar to EMS medical directors elsewhere. The medical director is responsible for the creation and issue of regulations, protocols, and standards of care on behalf of the community. Compliance with such regulations and medical protocols is mandatory for both EMS provider organisations, and for their personnel. The medical director usually performs these tasks with considerable latitude. Regulations and protocols may be developed and issued at the discretion of the medical director, who is required to govern their actions according to the general guidelines and financial guidance provided by his county or municipality. The position medical director is that of a consultant, and in some German states is required by law.

=== Roles ===
As in many other places, in Germany, the EMS system performs two major functions:

- Emergency services – Responding to all calls concerning immediate danger to the life and/or health of a person. This is the core component of the service, which is called Notfallrettung or Rettungsdienst in German. This service addresses acute onset illness and injury conditions, such as myocardial infarction, or accidents with severe injuries, to name just two.
- Non-emergency services – Arranging and performing the transport of non-emergency patients (i.e. transfer to, from, and between hospitals). This service is called Krankentransport in German, and provides service to non-ambulatory patients with low-acuity or chronic conditions, or to those who are recovering from acute care situations, and who lack the ability to use other means of transport (i.e. by taxi, own car or public transport).

In addition to regular emergency and non-emergency services, there are mobile intensive care units MICU stationed in most of the major cities. These units correspond to the critical care transport function found in other places. They are brought into action whenever a patient with a serious and complex medical condition, requiring advanced levels of support during transit, needs to be transferred between hospitals. This service usually applies to intensive-care unit patients, hence the German name Intensivtransport.

While not formally affiliated with the EMS system, the general practitioner (GP) frequently interacts with that system. In Germany, it is still commonplace for physicians to make house calls for those patients who are not able to visit a medical practice. Additionally, most cities and counties run a service called Ärztlicher Hausbesuchsdienst (Physician Home Call Service), which provides a GP to make housecalls for all people in the specific area. The physician will not only respond to patients from their own practice, but will also visit and treat patients all over the area. The GP service is delivered and maintained by an organisation known as the Kassenärztliche Vereinigung (Union of Health Fund Approved Physicians) and is usually only used for minor illnesses (i.e. fever, common cold), where a hospital stay is not necessary but the intervention of a physician may be advisable. The availability of this service provides a better treatment option to those patients who, in other EMS systems, might generate low-acuity ambulance calls or emergency department visits. Occasionally, the visiting GP will contact the EMS dispatcher and order a Krankentransport, should it be determined following medical assessment, that the patient could be cared for in a safer and better manner in a hospital.

== Emergency telephone numbers ==
The European emergency number for the fire brigade and emergency medical services, also in Germany, is 112. This number can be called toll-free from any phone (fixed-line, mobile or phone booth). The German police is available toll-free at 110 (or alternatively via the 112 operator). Dispatchers speak German, often English and the languages of neighboring countries in border areas; in some bigger cities (i.e. Berlin, Hamburg, Cologne or Munich), they might also understand other language(s).

Although it is not official, some mobile phones accept the American "911" as an emergency number in Germany, but it will not work from fixed-line phones or phone booths.

== Personnel ==
There are different specified qualifications in German EMS: the EMT level (Rettungssanitäter), the Paramedic level (Rettungsassistent, Notfallsanitäter) and the emergency physician (Notarzt).

In German EMS system, the first level of pre-hospital emergency care is given by paramedics, in life-threatening situations backed up by an emergency physician on scene. Thus the paramedic scope of skills include a set of advanced life support (ALS) treatments, they have to work until an emergency doctor is on scene. Then the paramedics (and other medical staff on scene) act under direct medical supervision of the physician.

Other (non life-threatening) emergencies are handled solely by the paramedic ambulances without a physician on scene.

=== Emergency physician (Notarzt) ===
The emergency physician, or Notarzt in German, must be a physician with a Notfallmedizin (Emergency Medicine) board certification, issued by the State Chamber of Physicians. In order to obtain the board certification, a minimum term of residency in a specialty related to critical care medicine, additional training in techniques of anaesthetics and critical care medicine, and passing of a board examination is required. The position is technically open to any physician who completes the board certification process.

Once on scene, the Notarzt is responsible for all tasks associated with physicians in the field, acts as the crew chief and provides medical direction to all subordinate EMS staff.

Emergency physicians are dispatched along with a paramedic ambulance according to several standard dispatch criteria (indication catalogue, "Notarzt-Indikationskatalog"), including myocardial infarction, dyspnoea, potential severe trauma, unconsciousness, life-threatening intoxication and needed pain management. Non-physician ambulance crews may request assistance from a Notarzt via dispatch as well.

Usually, the emergency physician gets to the scene in a separate vehicle, a Notarzt-Einsatzfahrzeug (abbr. NEF, emergency physician's vehicle).

=== Paramedic Level (Rettungsassistent and Notfallsanitäter) ===
There are two non-physician emergency professions in Germany, which are regulated and protected by German federal law: Rettungsassistent (two-year education, outdated since end of 2014) and Notfallsanitäter (three-year education, effective since 2015).

=== Emergency Medical Technician (EMT) Level ===
Lower-level qualifications enabling a person to work in EMS are the Rettungssanitäter (520-hour training) and Rettungshelfer (not standardized, around 240 hours out of the Rettungssanitäter curriculum). Both are not protected titles by federal law, but based on a national agreement of the German state ministry boards of 1977.

The training of a Rettungssanitäter is within a 520-hour program, including 160 hours theoretical classroom education, 160 hours hospital training, and 160 hours of ride-along in EMS, followed by a 40-hour final course with a state exam or an exam at a school accepted by the state. A Rettungssanitäter with this exam is allowed to work nationwide.

The Rettungshelfer basically is a person on the way to the full trained Rettungssanitäter. The level is not well-defined (varies from state to state or organization to organization), but mostly includes the 160-hour theoretical course and 80 hours of the EMS internship, but no state exam.

Depending on the state in which they work, those in the Rettungshelfer role are usually the drivers of non-emergency patient transports, with a Rettungssanitäter acting as crew chief for the vehicle. In most German states, for emergency ambulance service, those in the Rettungssanitäter role are often the drivers of emergency ambulances and act as an assistant to the Rettungsassistent and Notfallsanitäter.

=== Additional qualifications ===
Some additional qualifications and roles closely connected to EMS include:

- Leitender Notarzt ("Leading Emergency Physician") – a Notarzt with medical leadership responsibilities connected to mass casualty incidents.
- Organisatorischer Leiter ("Organisational Leader") and/or Einsatzleiter Rettungsdienst ("EMS chief on scene") – a Rettungsassistent or Notfallsanitäter whose role is to organize tactical EMS aspects during mass casualty incidents (i.e. communication, staging, transportation).
- Lehrrettungsassistent or Praxisanleiter Rettungsdienst ("Paramedic Instructor") – A Rettungsassistent or Notfallsanitäter responsible for the education and training.
- HEMS Crew Member – A Rettungsassistent or Notfallsanitäter who works as medical aircrew, responsible for assisting the pilot and the physician on a rescue helicopter.
- Einsatzsachbearbeiter / Leitstellendisponent – Someone who works in a dispatch center, most EMS dispatchers are obligated to obtain the level of Rettungssanitäter or even Notfallsanitäter as well as platoon or squad leader of the fire brigade, depending on local regulations. An additional dispatcher training course completes the skill set for dealing with emergency number calls and coordination of emergency and non-emergency responses.
- Wachleiter (station commander), Schichtleiter (shift commander) and Rettungsdienstleiter (EMS chief) are administrative roles, mostly requiring experience in the EMS field and additional administrative skills, often regulated by state laws.
- QM-Beauftragter (quality management representative), MPG-Beauftragter (medical equipment representative) and Hygiene-Beauftragter (hygiene representative) are other administrative roles, often required by laws and regulations.

=== Overview ===
In the German system, not only Paramedics and EMTs, but also physicians have recognized roles and skill levels. The following table will give a brief overview about the major qualifications and their place within the German EMS structure.

German system of prehospital care
Non-Emergency	Public health system							
Non-Emergency	Profession	English counterpart	Tasks					
Non-Emergency	Hausarzt/Allgemeinarzt	General practitioner	Treating patients in medical practice. If patient is not ambulatory, making housecalls. Typically only responding to own patients during practice hours.					
Non-Emergency	Kassenärztlicher Notdienst	GP "on call"	GP on call after hours, visiting patients not requiring EMS, but responding to calls throughout assigned area.					
Emergency	Emergency Medical Service							
Emergency	EMT	English counterpart	Training			Jobs		
Emergency	EMT	English counterpart	School	Hospital internship	Ambulance Internship	Patient transport Ambulance (KTW)	Emergency Ambulance (RTW)	Physicians Response Vehicle (NEF)
Emergency	Rettungshelfer (RettH/RH)	EMR / EMT	4 weeks (160 h)	0–2 weeks (0-80 h)	2–4 weeks (80-160 h)	driver	driver (occasionally)	driver (occasionally)
Emergency	Rettungssanitäter (RettSan/RS)	EMT	6 weeks (240 h)	2 weeks (80 h)	4 weeks (160 h)	crew chief	driver /patient care	driver
Emergency	Rettungsassistent (RettAss/RA)	Paramedic EMT-P	24 months	10 weeks	1 year	crew chief /patient care	crew chief /patient care	driver
Emergency	Notfallsanitäter (NFS/NotSan)	Paramedic EMT-P	1920h	720h	min. 1960h	crew chief /patient care	crew chief /patient care	driver
Emergency	Notarzt (NA)	Emergency physician	6 years (incl. 18 months of internship) 80 h course	min. 24 months of specialist training, incl. min. 6 months in intensive care or anaethesia	min. 50 runs (max. 25 can be simulated)	-	-	crew chief

== Vehicles ==
=== Ground Ambulances ===
The German EMS system's vehicles come in a wide variety of shapes and sizes. All of its vehicles must conform to most aspects of the requirements of European standard CEN 1789 as reflected in the German standard DIN EN 1789 (types A-C) or German standard DIN 75079. The visual identity requirements of the European standard are not yet being followed. The three major types of vehicle are:

1. The Krankentransportwagen (KTW), a van-type ambulance used for non-emergency transport. It conforms to DIN EN 1789-A1/A2: "Patient Transport Ambulance single/multiple patient"
2. The Rettungswagen (RTW), a larger van used for emergencies. It conforms to DIN EN 1789-C "Mobile Intensive Care Unit"
3. The Notarzteinsatzfahrzeug (NEF), a station wagon or small van. Its purpose is to bring the Notarzt (Emergency Physician) to the scene of the emergency, when required. It conforms to DIN 75079

Additionally, the Mehrzweckfahrzeug (MZF), or multi-purpose vehicle – often referred to as a Notfallkrankenwagen (N-KTW) or Kombinationsfahrzeug (KOM) – serves a dual role as patient transport vehicle and as backup for emergency responses and usually conforms to type B of DIN EN 1789.

Other vehicles that are also employed include neonatal units for special pediatric care and transport, intensive care transport units (ITW) for transporting ICU-patients from hospital to hospital with an emergency physician on board, ambulances for obese patients, special infectious transport units and disaster response supply vehicles. Some larger cities (i.e. Hamburg, Berlin) still operate Notarztwägen (NAW), a RTW supplemented by an emergency physician and additional material, although this system has become rather outdated, due to its lack of flexibility.

EMS in Germany

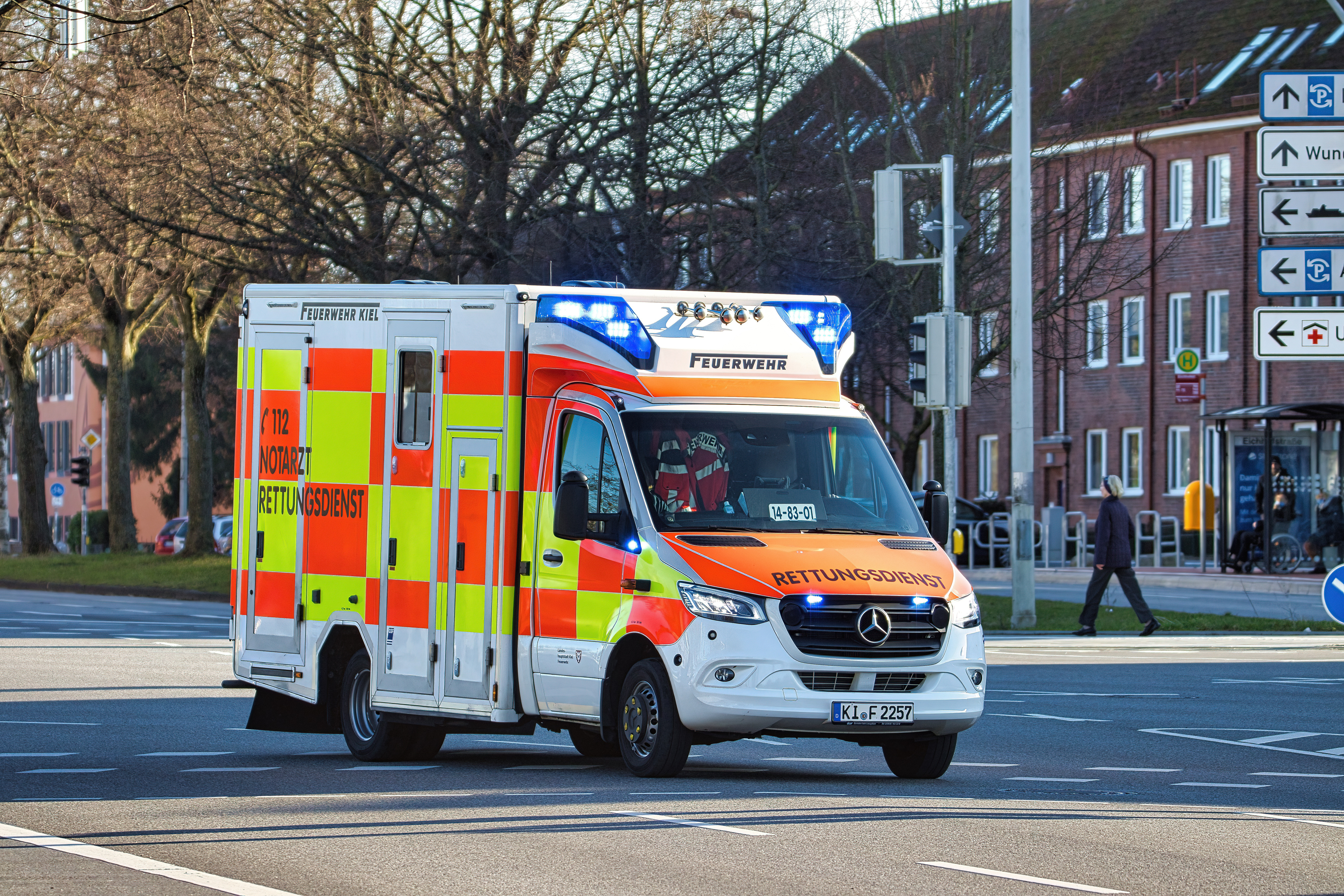
"Rettungswagen" of the Kiel Fire Department

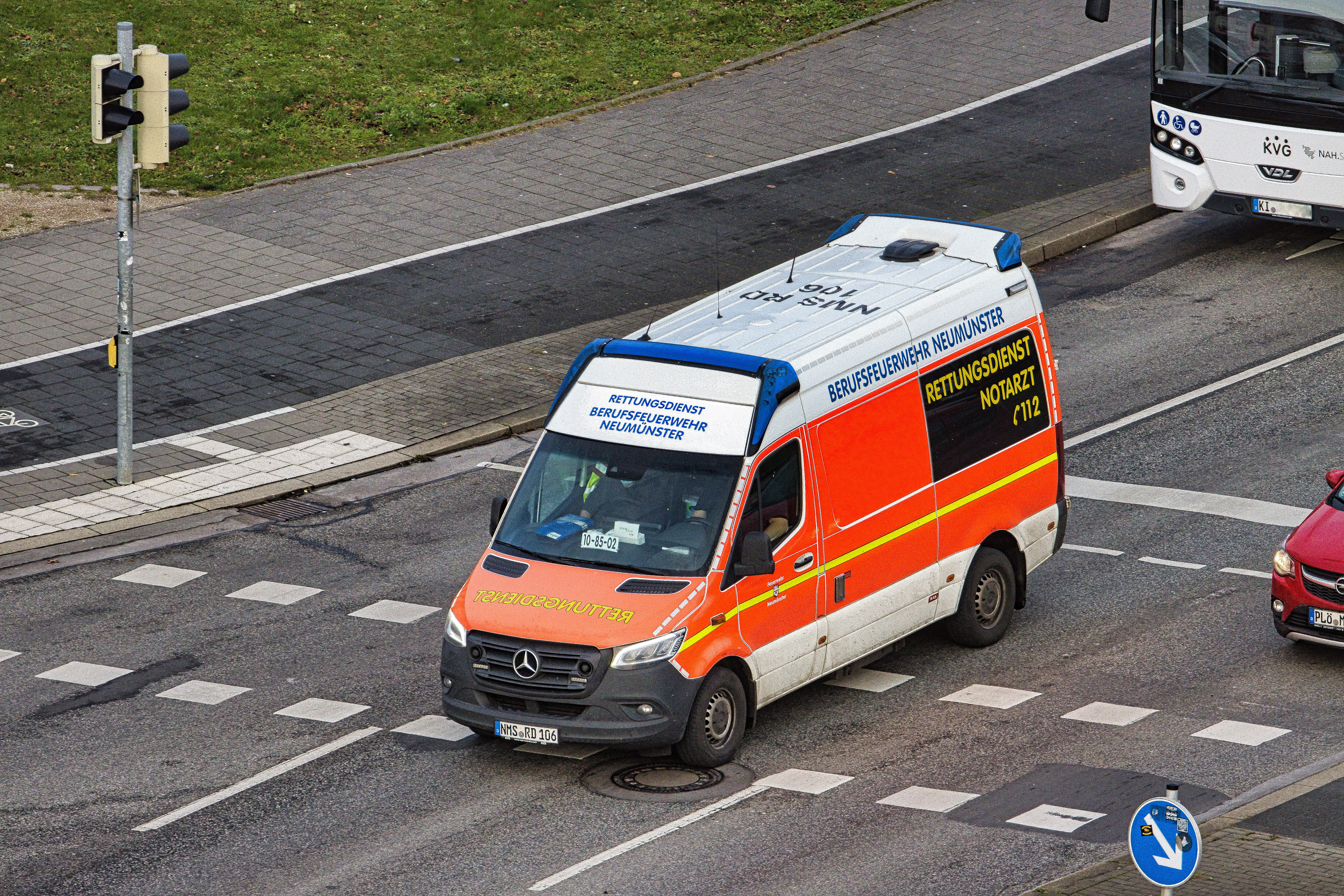
"Krankentransportwagen" of the Neumünster Fire Department

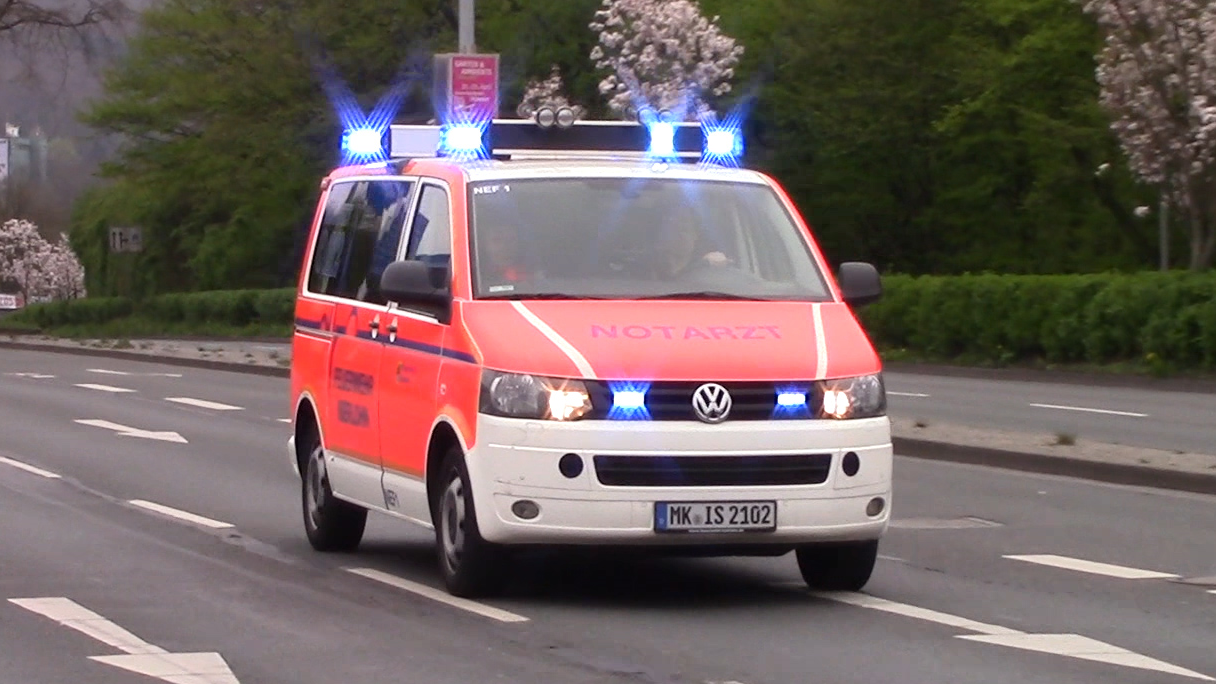
Emergency Physician Response Vehicle (Notarzteinsatzfahrzeug) from Fire Department Iserlohn

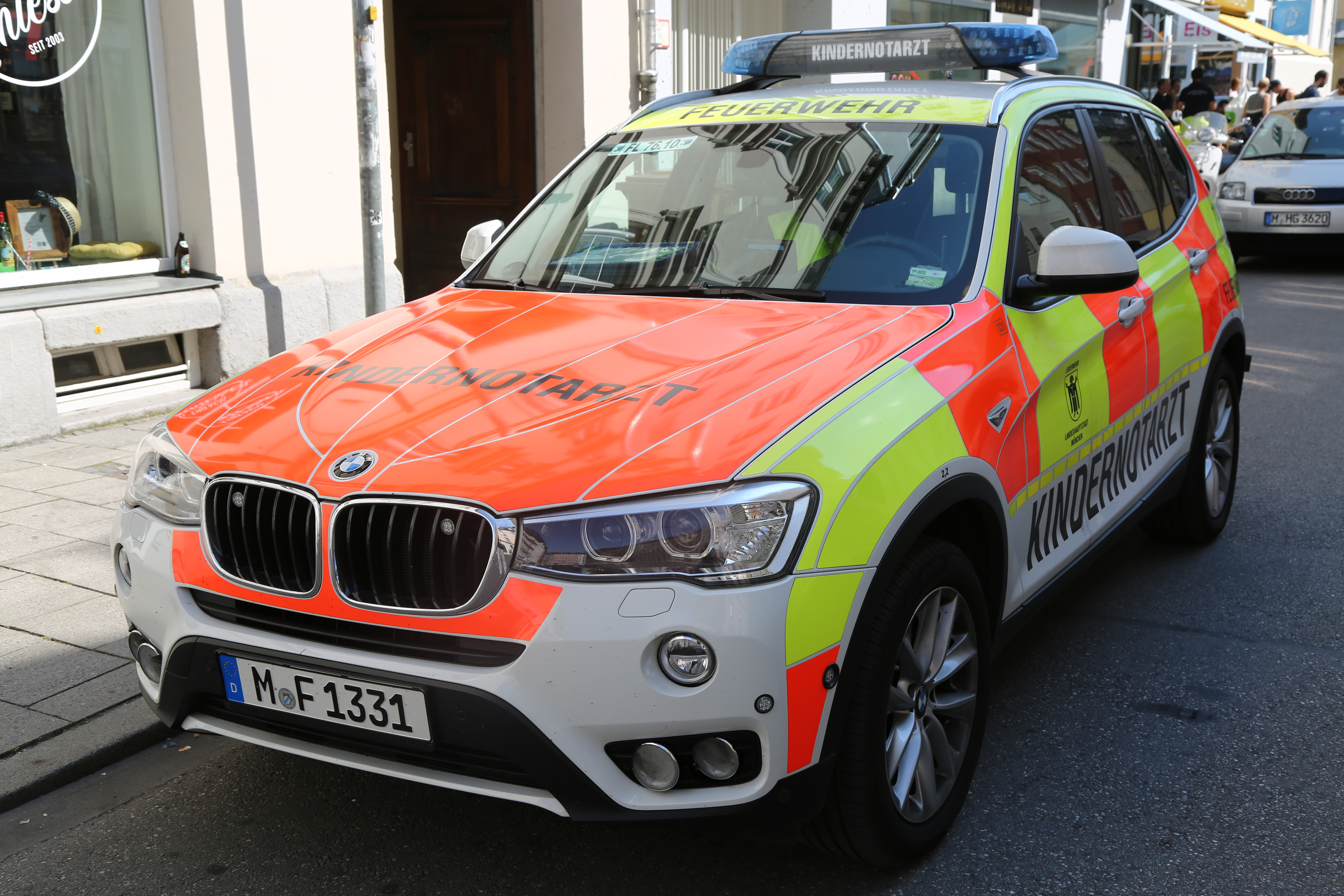
Specialized Emergency Physician Response Vehicle (Notarzteinsatzfahrzeug) for Children

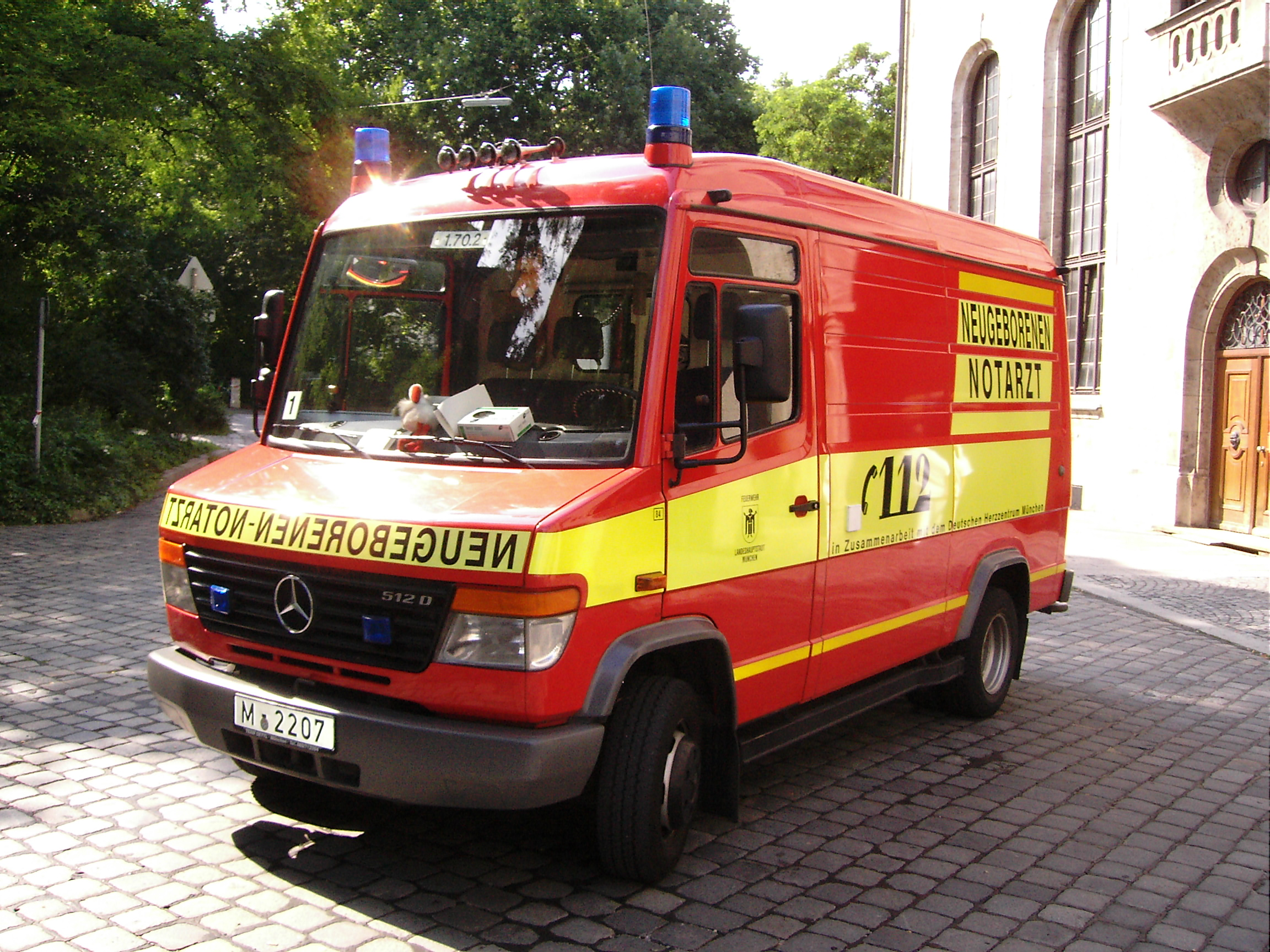
Mercedes-Benz T2 in use as a neonatal emergency ambulance (Baby-Notarztwagen)

=== Air Ambulance ===
Airbound EMS is an integral part of German EMS system, patient care and transport costs are covered by health insurances.

Germany has a well-developed air ambulance network, consisting of primary EMS helicopters, interhospital transport and dual use helicopters. Most of them are operated by Germany's largest automobile club ADAC, the non-profit "Deutsche Rettungsflugwacht e.V." (DRF) and the German Ministry of the Interior. Germany is completely covered by EMS helicopters, however most of them operate only during daytime.

Medical crew includes both a Notarzt and a Notfallsanitäter additionally qualified as HEMS Crewmember. Medical crews mostly are provided by associated hospitals or cooperating EMS organizations, the operating entity provides the pilots. Depending on helicopter type there may be an additional flight technician assigned to the crew.

As of the year 2015, ADAC operates 35 helicopters (EC135, H135, EC145, H145), where as the DRF provides 30 (EC135, H135, EC145, H145). The helicopter fleet of the Ministry of the Interior operates 12 rescue helicopters (EC135, H135), pilots provided by the Bundespolizei. There are also private intensive transports, in close cooperation with assigned hospitals.

Some private EMS helicopters for interfacility transport add to this fleet. Some multi-purpose police helicopters may perform additional emergency response and transport when required, those crews often are trained as Rettungssanitäter, medical staff will be provided by ground units in case.

In addition, ADAC and DRF operate a fleet of fixed wing air ambulances, including jets, primarily to provide foreign repatriation service to their club members. Other companies (often health insurances) provide foreign repatriation services for their customers as well, mostly with rented aircraft and medical staff.

Several military operated helicopters are designated for Air-sea rescue operations (ASR/SAR in context of ICAO and IMO regulations) and may assist in civil mass casualty scenarios. German Army operates four Helicopters in SAR Service (Airbus H145; two in Niederstetten, one in Nörvenich, one in Holzdorf), German Navy operates two Helicopters in SAR Service (Sea King; one in Helgoland, one in Hohe Düne). German Bundeswehr provides additional air medical evacuation (MEDEVAC) planes and helicopters, primarily for military use but used for support in civil crisis situations as well.

Air Ambulance in Germany

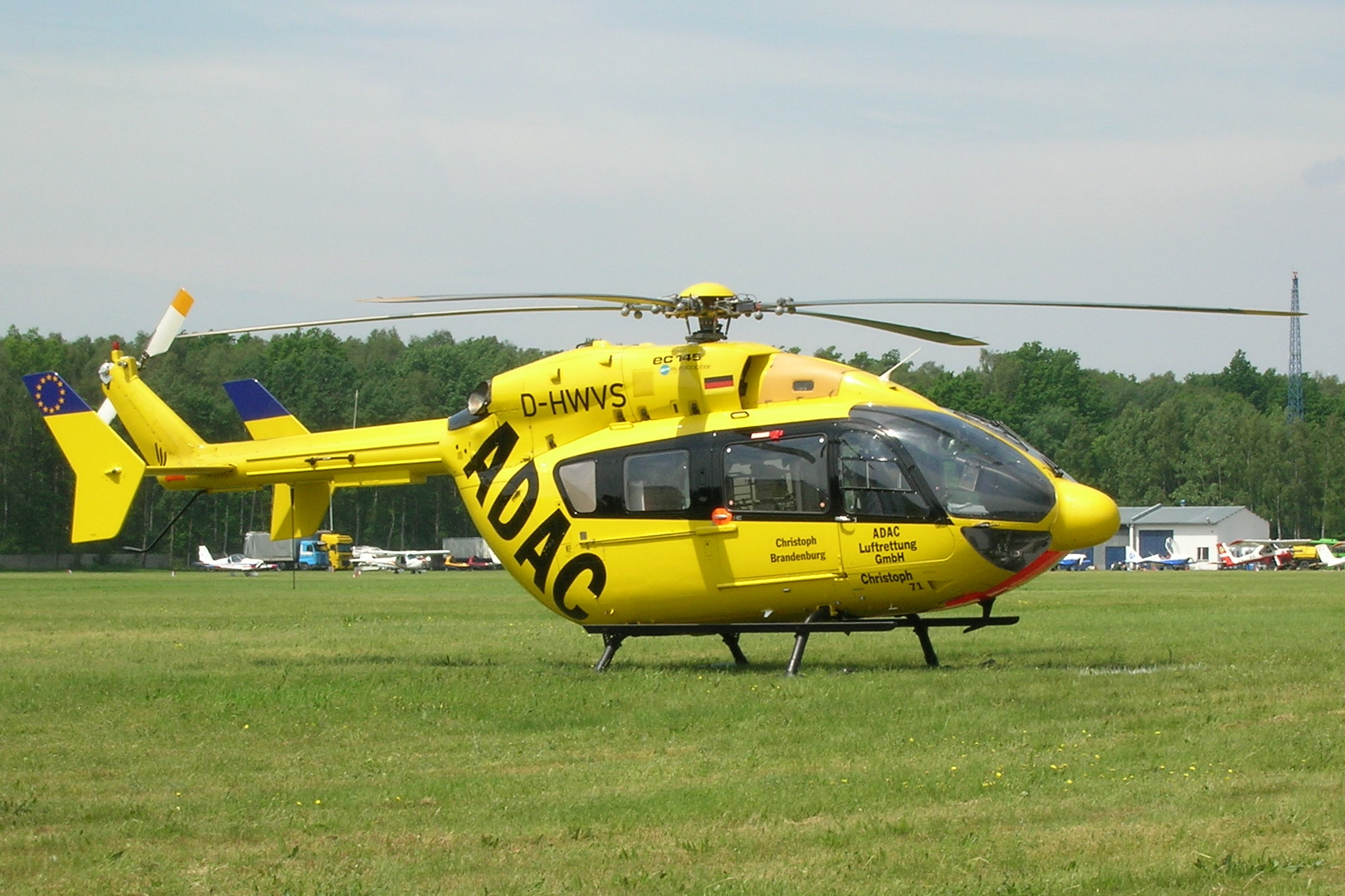
ADAC rescue helicopter

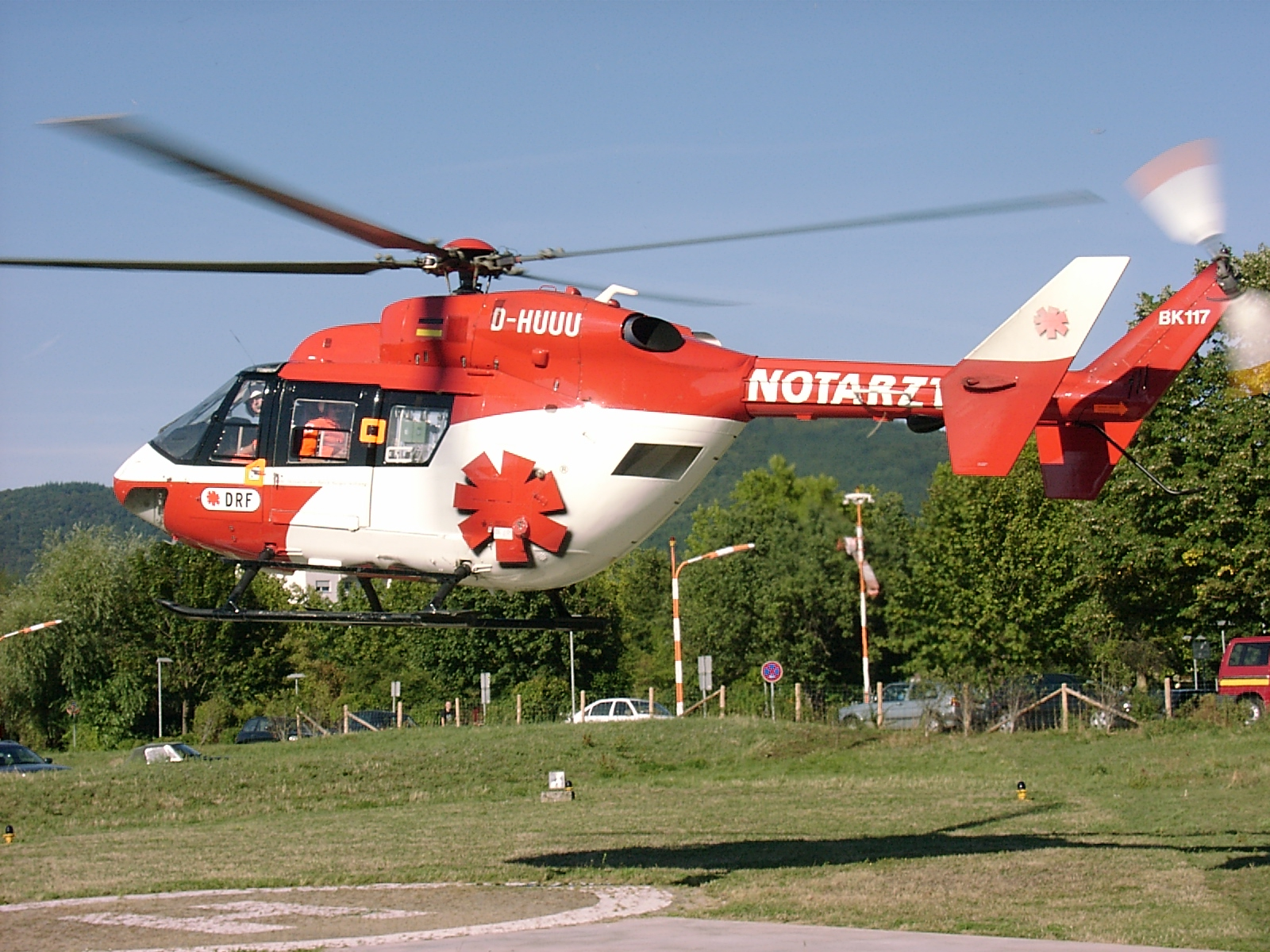
DRF rescue helicopter

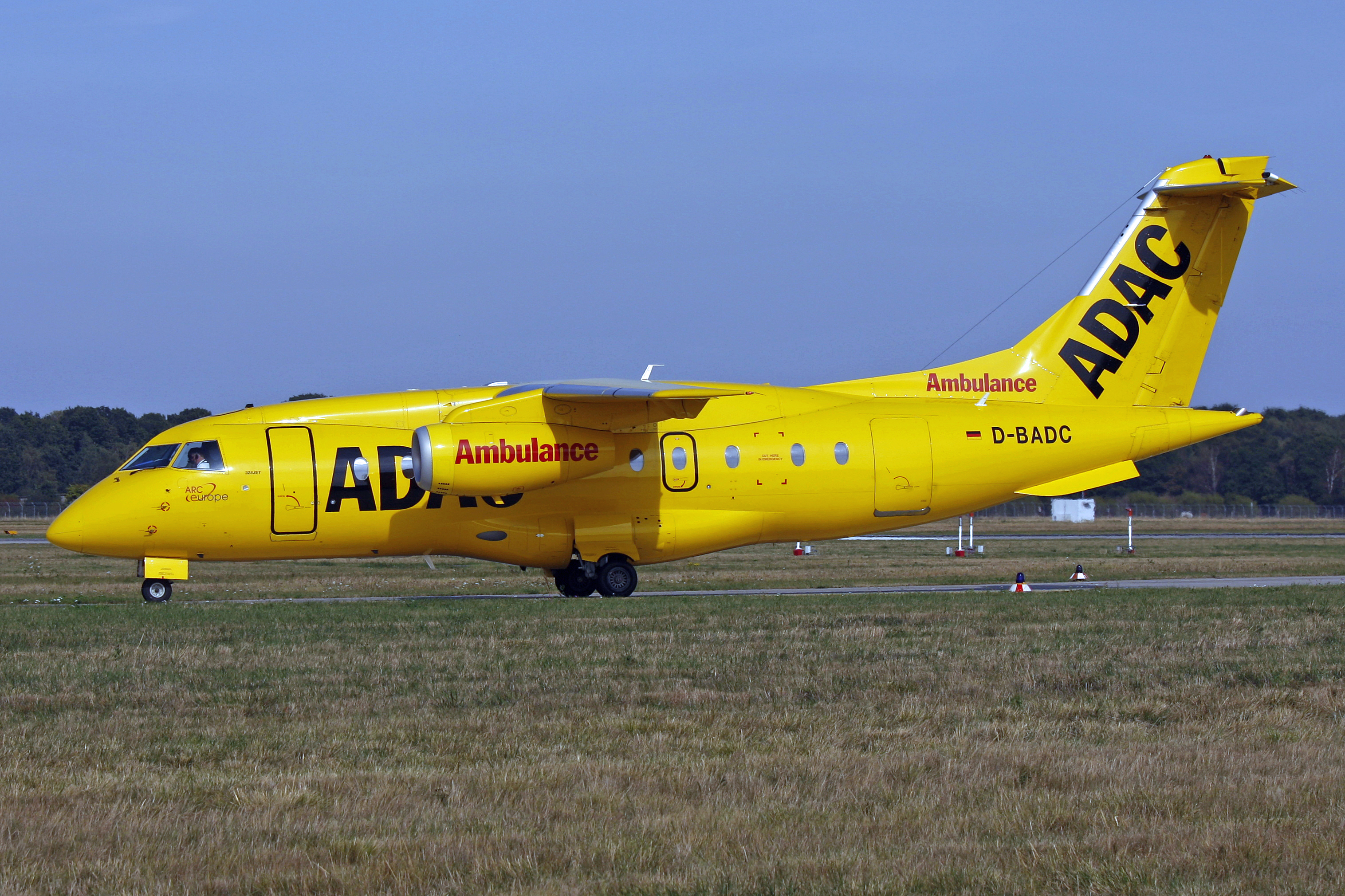
ADAC repatriation ambulance aircraft

=== Others ===
- Ships and boats for water rescue
- Motorized sleds and special all-terrain vehicles

== Equipment ==
The basic equipment of any ambulance includes:

- Basic First Aid kit
- Dressings and Bandages
- Basic diagnostic equipment, like blood-pressure cuffs.
- Mobile oxygen unit, equipment for basic airway management
- Portable defibrillator
- Wheel stretcher and blankets
- Vacuum mattress
- Flexible stretcher, also called a Reeves stretcher.
- Rigid or collapsible transport chair, also called a stair chair in the United States

Depending on the type of the vehicle, there are numerous additional items, among them are:

- ECG monitor (12 lead), pulse oximetry sensor device, capnography monitor
- Medical ventilator
- Rescue equipment like scoop stretcher and spine boards
- Immobilization equipment like Cervical collars and Splints
- Equipment for intravenous therapy
- Advanced airway management like Chest tubes and equipment for surgical airway management
- Emergency surgical equipment
- Special equipment for pediatric and birth emergencies
- Drugs, including a selection of analgesics, anaesthetics, cardiac stimulants, substances for circulatory problems and antidotes.
EMS Equipment and Work Environment

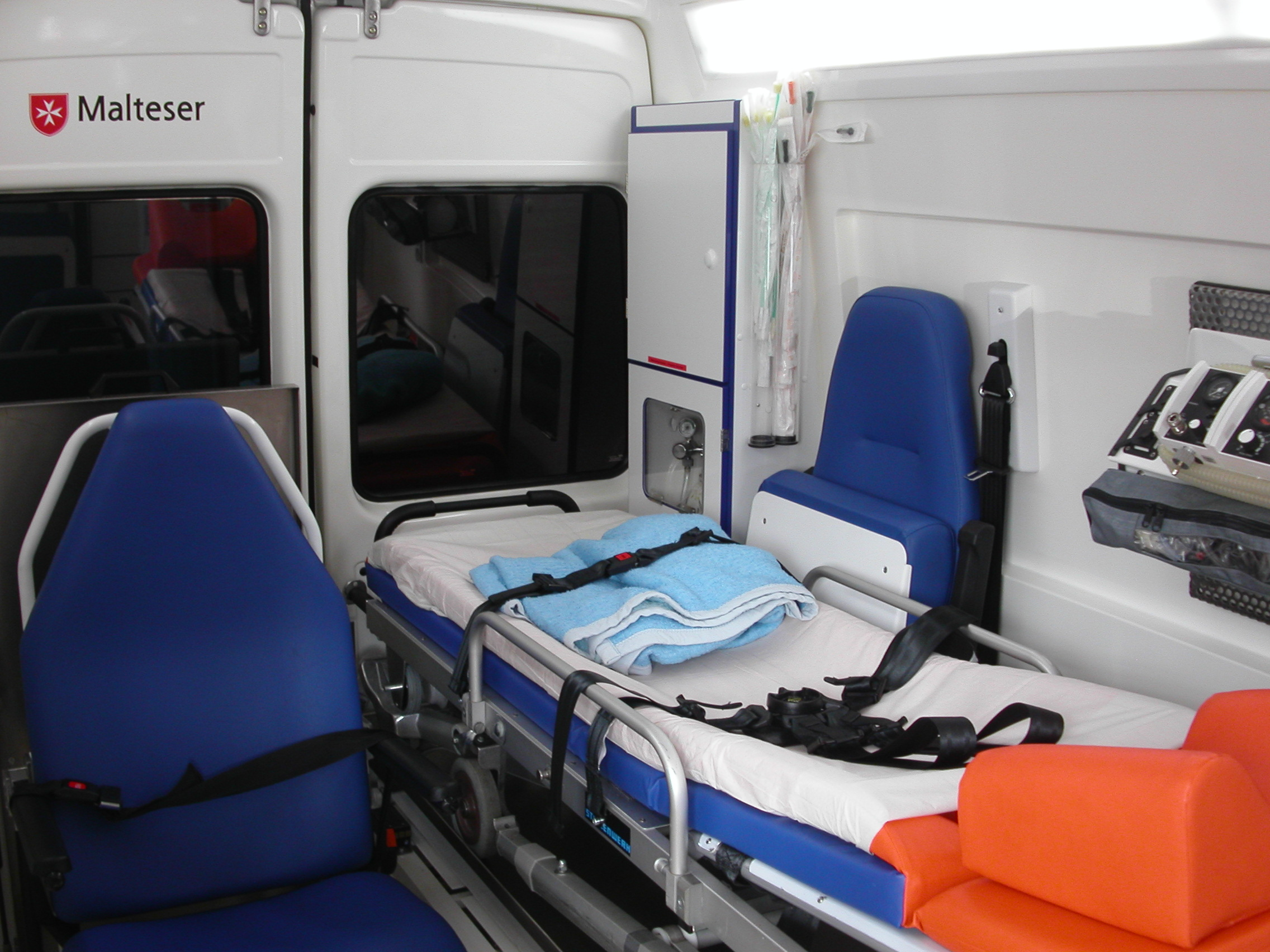
Interior view of a KTW: transport chair (left) gurney (middle) paramedic's chair(right). One can also see the O_{2} – bottles (cabinet in the rear) and the medical ventilator (right foreground)

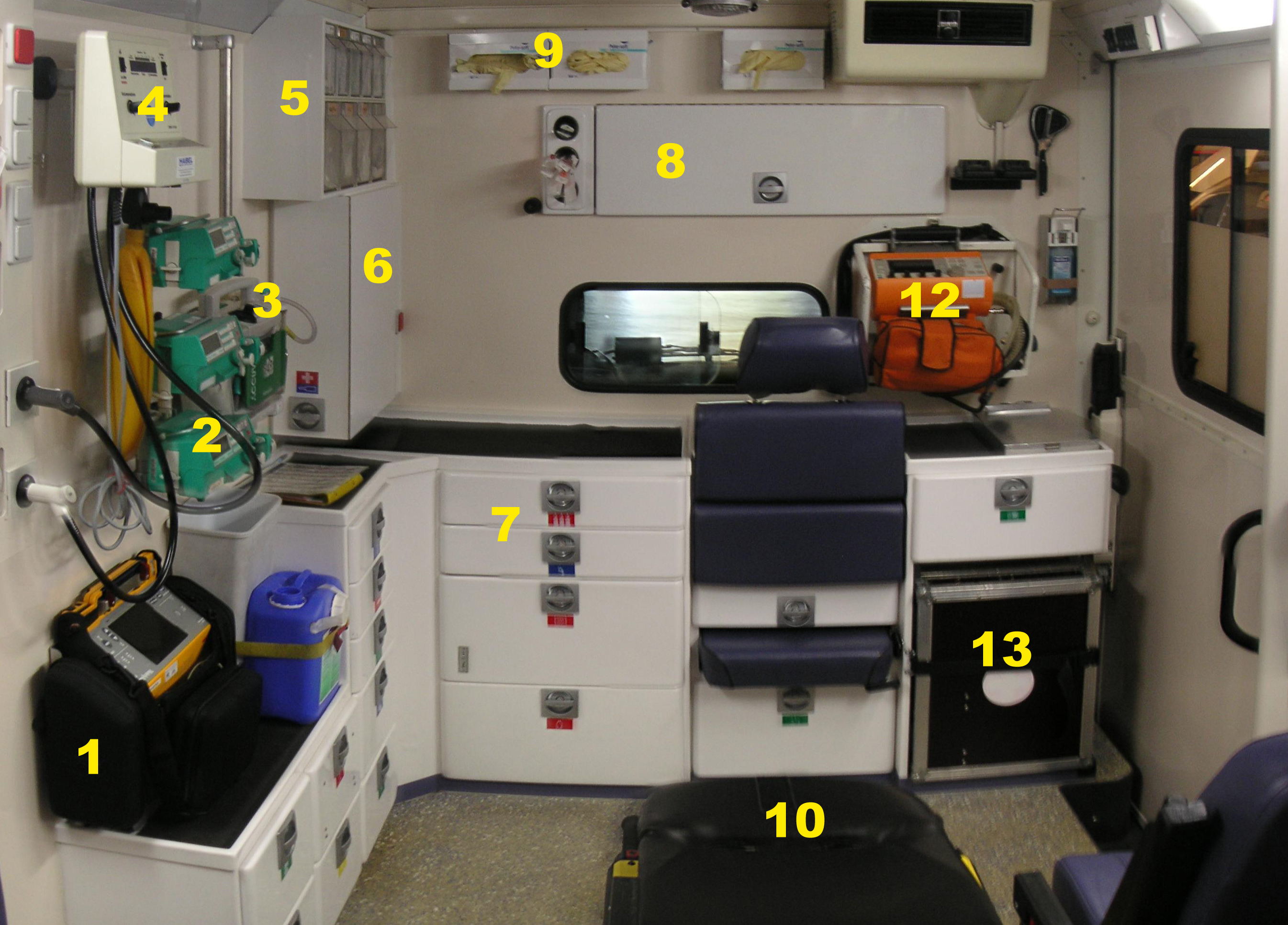
Interior of a type C ambulance

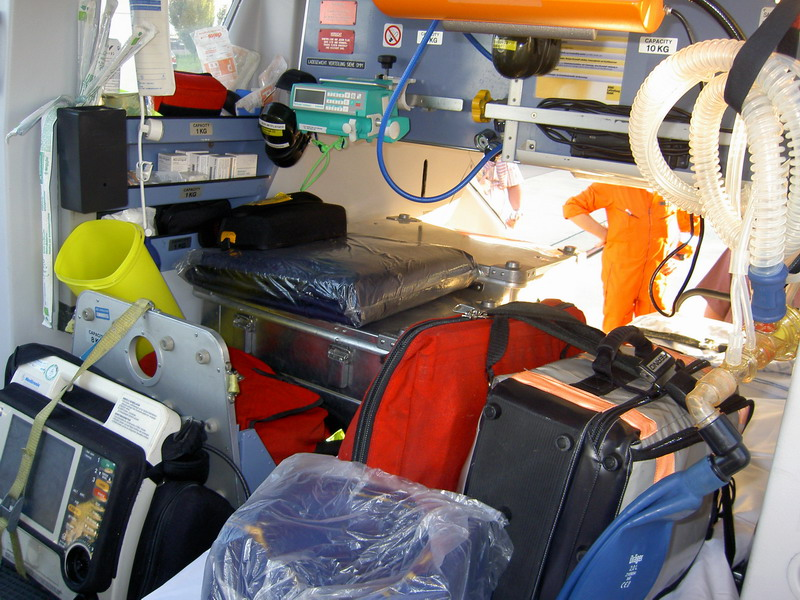
Interior view of an air ambulance helicopter

== Dispatch ==
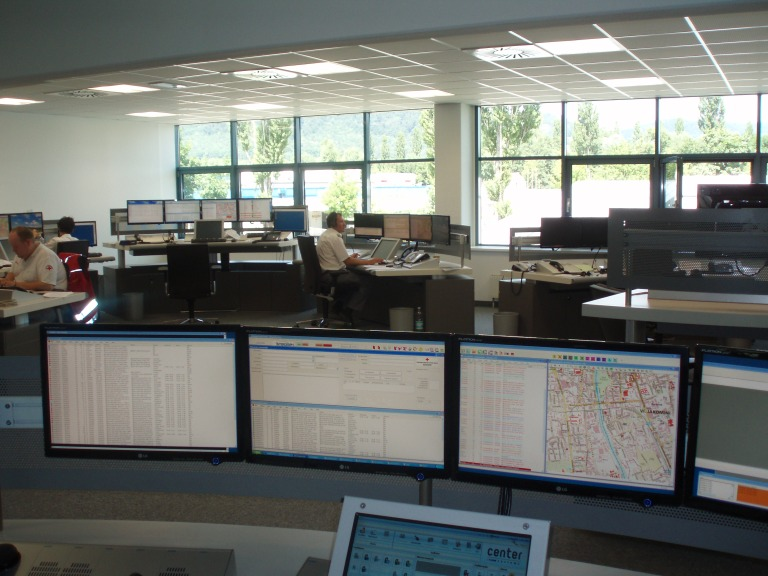
A workplace in an EMS dispatch centre

All emergency calls, regardless of the emergency number on which they originate, are routed to Dispatch Centres; in German Leitstelle. At present, most municipalities operate on an integrated system called Integrierte Leitstelle (joint dispatch), in which all calls involving fire and EMS are answered at the same location, and by the same personnel. There have been attempts to incorporate the police dispatch centers as well, more closely mirroring the U.S.-based 9-1-1 Public Safety Answering Point concept, however, due to the significantly different nature of the calls, it has been concluded that there are more disadvantages than advantages to this incorporation of all dispatch functions.

Once a call via the local emergency number is placed, a dispatcher will answer and ask the caller about the nature of the emergency. Due to dual training in joint dispatch centers, the dispatcher is able to answer calls concerning both the fire department and EMS. While the caller is being interviewed about call specifics, the dispatcher is already working on the computer, which will provide prompt questions, provide advice, and suggest response resources for this emergency. This computer system, while operating in German, is extremely similar to the AMPDS algorithm used by Emergency Medical Dispatchers in the United States.

To illustrate, a call is received in the dispatch center about a possibly unconscious person. The dispatcher will immediately identify the call location, and will then ask further questions, in order to assess precipitating symptoms, specific location, and any special circumstances (no house number, a neighbor is calling, etc.). While this interview is occurring, the dispatcher will enter the command Bewußtlosigkeit (unconsciousness) into the dispatch computer, resulting in an automatic suggestion to dispatch of a Rettungswagen (emergency ambulance) and a Notarzteinsatzfahrzeug (Doctor's Car). Upon entering the address of the patient, the computer will look for the emergency vehicles closest to this address. Now the dispatcher can send the whole package over the air and those two vehicles are alarmed, similar to Computer-assisted dispatch (CAD) in the United States. After sending the alarm, the dispatcher may remain on the line with the caller, providing telephone advice or assistance until the EMS resources arrive on the scene.

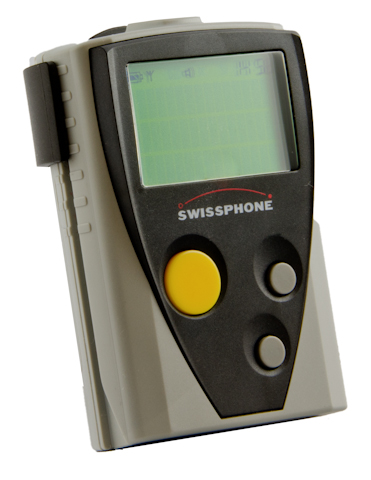
"Swissphone DE900" digital pager

=== Alerting crews ===
Emergency vehicles are sent on runs by a number of means. The most common system is by pager, issued to every crew. Pagers may operate on either an analog or a digital system. Analog pagers will silently listen on the air for a 5-tone signal being transmitted. Once the individual signal for that pager is detected, the pager will sound an alarm, and will often open the channel for the crew to hear the dispatcher. Further information is being given via radio. The digital pagers will listen on a different channel and once its individual address is transmitted, will prepare to receive a data package. This package normally consists of a short message, providing the address and nature of the emergency as well as additional information. This clears the radio channel of lengthy calls. Theoretically, no additional radio traffic is required when using such a system.

== Communication ==
All public emergency services in Germany (i.e. EMS, fire, police, disaster response) use the same radio system for communication. Thus, they can connect to each other with their radio equipment.

Since the 1950s the units were equipped with radios in the 4m frequency band, handheld units work in the 2m band. This analog radio usage is protected by law for emergency use only. Relay stations cover whole Germany. With entering the appropriate channel, every radio can reach another dispatch center or agency.

Since around 2010 a nationwide digital radio communication standard is implemented. This is based on the Terrestrial Trunked Radio (TETRA) standards. Main advances over the old analog radio system are availability of far more channels and communication groups, encryption possibilities, noise filtering and enhanced signal reliability. To cover whole Germany about 4500 base stations are needed. As of August 2015 already 4338 of them are installed and 4323 working, thus about 97% of Germany is covered. Migration to the new radio standard is ongoing step by step, parallel use of the analog system is planned until around 2020.

Now there are Mobile Radio Terminals (MRT) for vehicles, Handheld Radio Terminals (HRT) and Fixed Radio Terminals (FRT). All radios can be switched between Trunked Mode Operation (TMO) and Direct Mode Operation (DMO). Communication with dispatch is done in TMO, on scene communication works in DMO. Every radio can be allowed access to the communication of another agency, either when already programmed this way or given access by the dispatch center. Organization, infrastructure and security keys are centrally managed by a government authority (Bundesanstalt für den Digitalfunk der Behörden und Organisationen mit Sicherheitsaufgaben), assisted by a net of authorized and tactical bodies throughout the country.

== Staging and deploying resources ==
There are two different strategies used in dispatching EMS vehicles in Germany; the Rendezvous system and the Station system

=== Rendezvous system ===
In this model, the emergency ambulance (RTW) and Doctor's car (NEF) are not necessarily co-located. In most emergencies, only the ambulance is deployed for providing patient care and transport. However, when the situation on scene is of a more severe nature, the ambulance crew can radio in for support by a physician and the NEF will be deployed. There are some medical situations where the NEF will be deployed automatically; those are usually pediatric emergencies, patients who are unconscious, emergencies including neurological or cardiovascular conditions, mass-casualty incidents, and situations where the need for analgesics and anesthetics is foreseeable. The advantage of this system is the fact that the physician is available for other emergencies, while the ambulance crew can handle minor cases on their own.

=== Station system ===
In this system, the physician on duty will actually staff the ambulance, which is now called a Notarztwagen, will be deployed to any serious medical case. The advantage with this approach lies in the ability to perform more difficult tasks without delay, however, on most calls the presence of the physician is not actually required. Nowadays, it's rather outdated.
