= Orders, decorations, and medals of the Sovereign Military Order of Malta =

The following is a comprehensive list of orders, decorations, and medals bestowed by the Sovereign Military Order of Malta, both in the present-day and historically.

== Orders ==
=== Order of Saint John ===
Order of Saint John
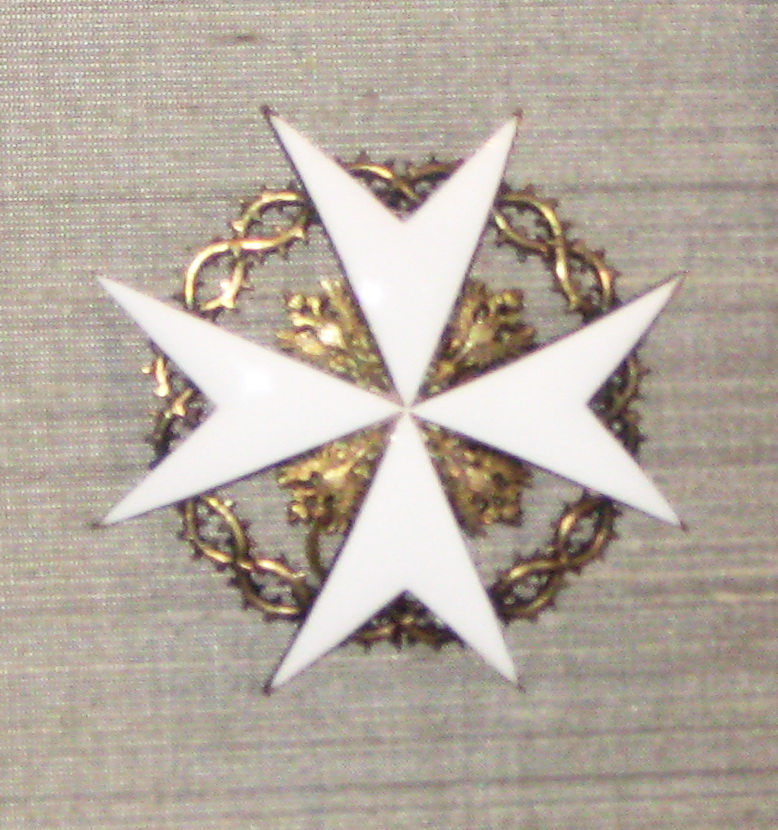
- Star of the order

Awarded by the Sovereign Military Order of Malta
- Religious affiliation: Roman Catholic
- Ribbon: Black
- Status: Currently constituted
- Sovereign: Prince John Dunlap
- Lieutenant: Ruy Gonçalo do Valle Peixoto de Villas-Boas

Precedence
- Next (higher): None (highest)
- Next (lower): Order of Merit
- Ribbon of the order

The Order of Saint John of Jerusalem (or in full as the Sovereign Military Hospitalier Order of Saint John of Jerusalem, of Rhodes and of Malta) is the most senior of the orders and decorations of chivalry of the Sovereign Military Order of Malta.

==== Classes and grades ====
First Class (Knights of Justice and Conventual Chaplains)

Venerable Bailiff Knights Grand Cross of Justice Professed of Solemn Vows
Knights Grand Cross of Justice Professed of Solemn Vows
Commanders of Justice Professed of Solemn Vows
Knights of Justice Professed of Solemn Vows
Knights of Justice Professed of Simple Vows
Knights admitted to the Novitiate
Conventual Chaplains Grand Cross Professed of Solemn Religious Vows
Conventual Chaplains Professed of Solemn Religious Vows
Conventual Chaplains Professed of Simple Religious Vows

Second Class (Knights and Dames in Obedience)

Bailiff Knights Grand Cross in Obedience
Knights and Dames Grand Cross in Obedience
Knights and Dames in Obedience

Third Class – First Category (Knights and Dames of Honour and Devotion)

Bailiff Knights Grand Cross of Honour and Devotion with Profession Cross ad honorem
Bailiff Knights Grand Cross of Honour and Devotion
Knights and Dames Grand Cross of Honour and Devotion
Knights of Honour and Devotion owner of Commandery of Family Patronage
Knights and Dames of Honour and Devotion
Bailiff Knights Grand Cross of Honour and Devotion for Cardinals of the Holy Roman Church

Third Class – Second Category (Conventual Chaplains ad honorem)

Conventual Chaplains Grand Cross ad honorem
Conventual Chaplains ad honorem

Third Class – Third Category (Knights and Dames of Grace and Devotion)

Knights Grand Cross of Grace and Devotion with Sash
Knights and Dames Grand Cross of Grace and Devotion
Knights and Dames of Grace and Devotion

Third Class – Fourth Category (Magistral Chaplains)

Magistral Chaplains

Third Class – Fifth Category (Knights and Dames of Magistral Grace)

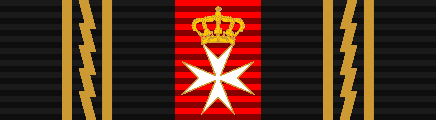
Knights Grand Cross of Magistral Grace with Sash
Knights and Dames Grand Cross of Magistral Grace
Knights and Dames of Magistral Grace

Third Class – Sixth Category (Donats of Devotion)

Donats of Devotion

== Medals ==
=== Awards for Humanitarian Relief & Emergencies ===
Silver Medal for the Calabria and Sicily earthquake (April 24th 1912)
Bronze Medal for the Calabria and Sicily earthquake (April 24th 1912)
Silver Medal for the Turkey War (April 24th 1912)
Bronze Medal for the Turkey War (April 24th 1912)
Merit Medal for assistance to the 1940–1945 War Veterans
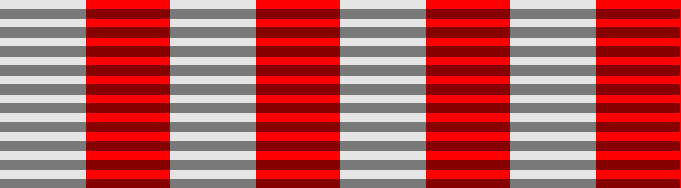
Silver Medal for assistance to the Hungarian Refugees
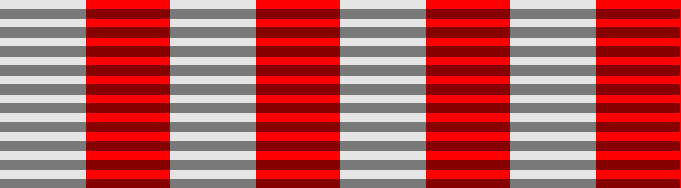
Bronze Medal for assistance to the Hungarian Refugees
Medal for relief activities in Vietnam
Bronze medal commemorating the 900th anniversary of the recognition of the SMOM by Pope Paschal II (1113–2013)
SMOM Commemorative Medal for the Solemn Exposition of the Holy Shroud in Turin in 2015 (SMOM Magisterial Decree No. 15421 of 12/13 October 2015, medal not portative & ribbon exclusively portative on SMOM Uniforms "from Pilgrimage")
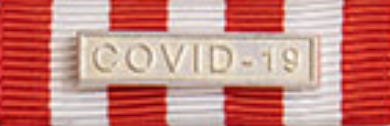
SMOM Campaign Medal (2022) for medical personnel with clasp

=== Malteser International ===
Malteser International Medal of Merit in Gold
Malteser International Medal of Merit in Silver
Malteser International Medal of Merit in Bronze
Malteser International Medal of Commitment "St. Martin 2007"
Malteser International Service Medal

=== Emergency Corps of the Order of Malta ===
ECOM Medal for Kosovo 1999
ECOM Medal for Rwanda 2002

=== Medal and awards of national associations ===
==== Malteser Hospitaldienst Austria ====
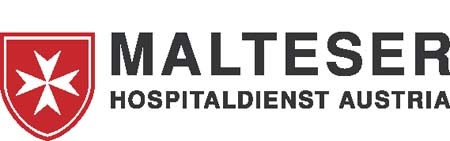

Merit Medal in Gold
Merit Medal in Silver
Merit Medal in Bronze
Medal for the relief of the Kosovo refugees (1999)
Euro 2008 Medal in Gold
Euro 2008 Medal in Silver

==== Malteser in Deutschland – Malteser Hilfsdienst e.V. (Germany) ====
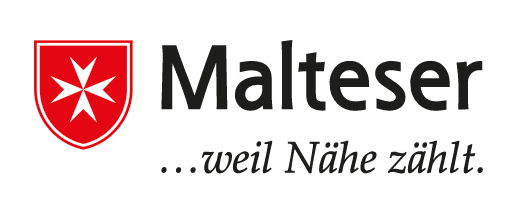

Malteser Hilfsdienst long service medal (60 years)
Malteser Hilfsdienst long service medal (50 years)
Malteser Hilfsdienst long service medal (40 years)
Malteser Hilfsdienst long service medal (30 years)
Malteser Hilfsdienst long service medal (25 years)
Malteser Hilfsdienst long service medal (20 years)
Malteser Hilfsdienst long service medal (10 years)
Malteser Hilfsdienst service medal
Memorial Medal for the Malteser Hilfsdienst 50th Anniversary Jubilee

Thanks and Gratitude Medal in Gold
Thanks and Gratitude Medal in Silver
Thanks and Gratitude Medal in Bronze

Memorial ribbon for the World Youth Day 2005
Memorial ribbon for the Pope's visit 2006
Memorial ribbon for the Pope's visit 2011

==== Order of Malta Federal Association (USA) ====
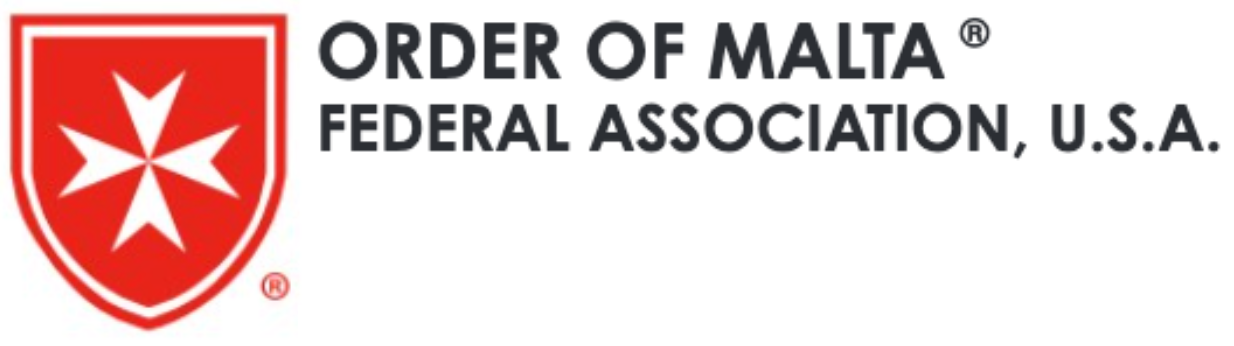

Order of Malta Federal Association USA Pilgrimage for Life Medal
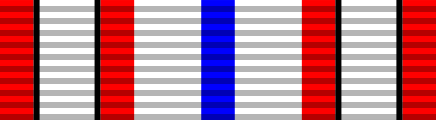
Order of Malta Federal Association USA Presidential Medal

==== Order of Malta Irish Association and Ambulance Corps (Republic of Ireland and Northern Ireland) ====
===== Current Medals in Use =====
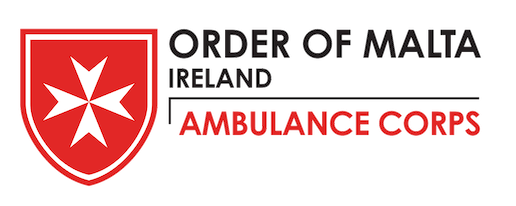

Service Medal (10 years)
Service Medal (20 years)
Service Medal (30 years)
Service Medal (40 years)
Service Medal (50 years)
Lourdes 3 Year Service Medal.
Lourdes 10 Year Service Medal.
Order of Malta Ambulance Corps Gold Medal of Merit (1971 model)
Order of Malta Ambulance Corps Silver Medal of Merit (1971 model)
Order of Malta Ambulance Corps Bronze Medal of Merit (1971 model)
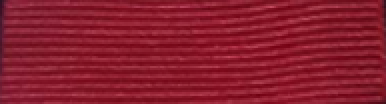
Order of Malta Ambulance Corps COVID 19 medal with clasp, possibly a future General Service Medal.

===== Anniversaries, Jubilees, and Pilgrimages =====
900 Year Anniversary Medal (1999)
Cadet 50th Anniversary Medal (1999)
Order of Malta Ambulance Corps Gold Jubilee Medal (1988)
Papal Visit to Ireland Medal (1979) & (2018)
Papal Visit to Canada Medal (2002)
Rome Pilgrimage Medal (1975)
Rome Pilgrimage Medal (1984)
Rome Pilgrimage Medal (2000)
Poland Pilgrimage Medal (1991)
Special Olympics 2003 Service Medal

===== Former Medals =====
OMAC Long Service Medal (10 years) (Old)
OMAC Long Service Medal (20 years) (Old)
Order of Malta Ambulance Corps Gold Medal of Merit (1943 model)
Order of Malta Ambulance Corps Silver Medal of Merit (1943 model)
Order of Malta Ambulance Corps Bronze Medal of Merit (1943 model)

==== Associazione dei Cavalieri Italiani del Sovrano Ordine di Malta e Corpo Militare dell'Esercito dell'ACISMOM (Italy) ====
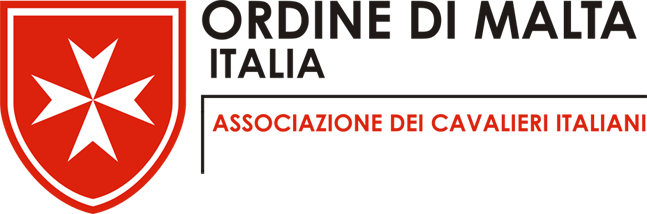

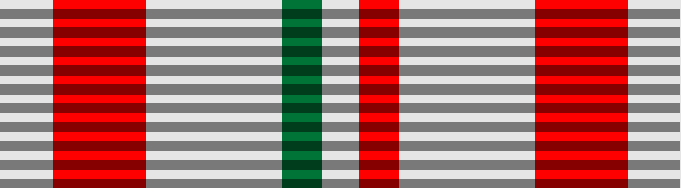
Medal for the Southern Italy earthquake (1980)
Medal for the Northern Italy Emergency (2000)
Medal for the Abruzzo earthquake (1999)

Memorial Medal of the Redemption Jubilee Pilgrimage (1933)
Merit Medal for assistance to the Holy Year pilgrims (1975)
Medal for the assistance to the Redemption Jubilee pilgrims (1983)
Medal for the assistance to the Redemption Jubilee pilgrims (2000)
Medal for the assistance to the Mercy Jubilee pilgrims (2016)

Merit medals for the Lourdes Pilgrimages
Ribbon for the Malta Order Lourdes Pilgrimages 150th Anniversary
Pilgrimages Memorial Medal
Lourdes Pilgrimages Memorial Medal
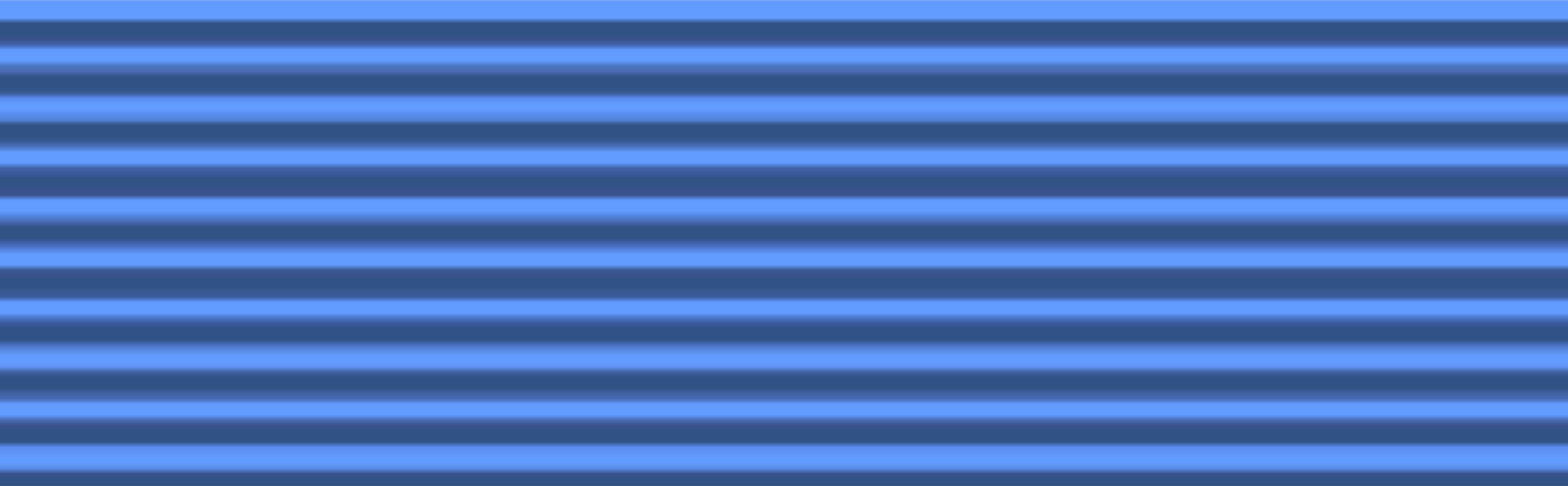
Loreto Pilgrimages Memorial Medal

Memorial Medal for the second millennium from the birth of Saint Paul Apostle of the People (21 November 2009)

Honour Merit Badge of the Military Corps of the order of Malta, awarded in the Gold, Silver and Bronze classes.

Memorial Medal of the 1915–1918 War
Memorial Medal of the 1940–1945 War, awarded in the Silver Class for officers and Bronze Class for other ranks.

Memorial Medal for the operations in the former Yugoslavia (7 June 1996)

Long Service Cross for Managers and volunteer nurses (24 October 1941)
Long Service Cross for NCOs and other ranks (24 October 1941)

==== Assembly of Portuguese Knights of the Sovereign Military Order of Malta (Portugal) ====
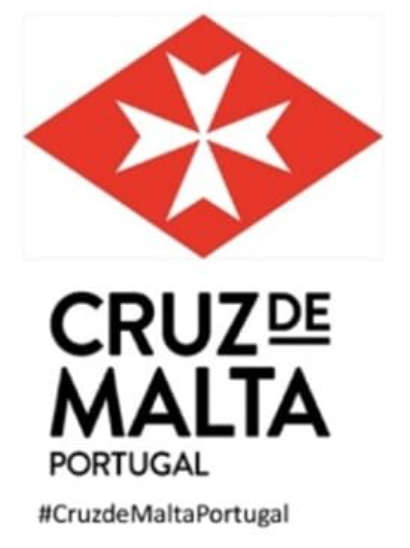

Cruz de Mérito de Frei São Nuno Álvares Pereira
