= Knight of Malta (disambiguation) =

Knight of Malta may refer to:

- a member of the Knights Hospitaller after 1530
- a member of the Sovereign Military Order of Malta after 1822
- a rank within the Knights Templar (Freemasonry)
- a member of the Ancient and Illustrious Order Knights Of Malta, a Protestant fraternal society
- The Knight of Malta, a Jacobean-era stage play
- RMS Knight of Malta, a cargo liner

== See also ==
- History of Malta under the Order of Saint John
