= Arbeiter-Samariter-Bund Deutschland =

German humanitarian charity

Workers' Samaritan Federation Germany
- Arbeiter-Samariter-Bund Deutschland
- Abbreviation: ASB
- Formation: 1888; 138 years ago
- Headquarters: Cologne
- Location: Germany
- Services: First aid, First aid training, Elderly care, Emergency medical services, and Social work
- Members: 1.5 million
- President: Katarina Barley
- Federal Chairman: Knut Fleckenstein
- Federal Chief Medical Officer: Matthias Vonnemann
- Subsidiaries: Arbeiter-Samariter-Jugend (youth organisation)
- Affiliations: Samaritan International
- Staff: 50,000
- Volunteers: 20,000
- Website: www.asb.de

Arbeiter-Samariter-Bund Deutschland or ASB (English: Workers' Samaritan Foundation Germany) is a German charitable aid agency founded in 1888.

== History ==
The Industrial Revolution of the 19th century led to a dramatic increase in accidents at work. Therefore, in 1877 the St. John's Ambulance Association of the Order of St. John was established in England. In many cities, medical schools were set up and volunteers trained.

In the summer of 1881, the German surgeon Friedrich von Esmarch (1823-1908) met St John's Ambulance Association leadership in London and founded a Samaritan school on his return to Germany. Numerous notes from the German-Samaritan-Federation were subsequently issued; however, they were directed primarily to senior health officials and were inclusive of the broad mass of workers.

In 1888, six carpenters in Berlin took the initiative and set up the first course on the First Aid in the event of a disaster on 29 November 1888, and founded the first column of what would become the Workers' Samaritan Federation Germany. Soon these courses became a regular commitment of the association, which changed its name in 1895 to "Samariterkursus für Arbeiter und Arbeiterinnen" (Samaritan courses for workers).

In 1909, 11 Samaritan workers columns joined forces to form the Workers' Samaritan League at a founding meeting in Magdeburg. The first seat of the federation was Berlin. In 1923, two chemist Samaritans, Theodor Kretzschmar and Eugen Richter, were elected as Federal Councilor and Federal Treasurer of the ASB. This meant the relocation of the ASB's headquarters to Chemnitz. In Herchen, the ASB operated a recreation centre during this period. In 1933 about 48,000 members of the ASB were active in 1,510 columns.

After the rise of Adolf Hitler, the ASB was placed under National Socialist leadership.

After 1945, in the Soviet occupation zone, the Soviet Military Administration in Germany suppressed the ASB, which consequently did not exist in the later German Democratic Republic. In West Germany, former workers' Samaritans in various regions of Germany sought to rebuild the ASB immediately after the end of the war. With the establishment of the Federal Republic of Germany, the ASB developed supra-regional structures. In April 1952 ASB Deutschland eV was officially founded. The seat of the federation was initially Hanover, then with the construction of new federal headquarters, the seat was moved to Sülz. After German reunification, the ASB was established in 1990 in the eastern federal states.

== See also ==
- Emergency medical services in Germany
- German Red Cross
