= Johannine (disambiguation) =

Johannine literature

- Johannine epistles
- Johannine Comma
- Johannine community
- Johannine script
- Johannine baroque, Portuguese architecture style
