= Order of Saint John (disambiguation) =

Order of Saint John or Knights Hospitaller is a chivalric order of the Crusades and early modern period, after 1530 also known as "Knights of Malta"

Order of Saint John of Jerusalem may also refer to:

- Sovereign Military Order of Malta (since 1822), officially Sovereign Military Hospitaller Order of Saint John of Jerusalem, of Rhodes and of Malta, modern Catholic continuation of the Order of Saint John
- Order of Saint John (Bailiwick of Brandenburg), now headquartered in Berlin, separated from the Catholic Order of Malta as a Protestant order of merit in 1812
  - Royal Prussian Order of Saint John, an order of merit in the Kingdom of Prussia; set up in 1812 and was awarded until 1852
- Order of Saint John in Sweden, whose Sovereign Head is the monarch of Sweden; founded in 1920 in Stockholm, Sweden
- Order of Saint John in the Netherlands, whose Sovereign Head is the monarch of the Netherlands
- Most Venerable Order of Saint John (chartered 1888), whose Sovereign Head is the monarch of the United Kingdom and the other Commonwealth realms; based in London, its responsibilities include overseeing St. John Ambulance and the St. John Eye Hospital in Jerusalem
- Alliance of the Orders of Saint John of Jerusalem, a federation of mutually recognised Protestant branches of the Order of Saint John (since 1961)
- Russian tradition of the Knights Hospitaller, the Russian Orthodox tradition from the Knights Hospitaller, springing from the Grand Mastership of Emperor Paul I of Russia (1799)
  - Order of Saint John of Jerusalem (Russia)
- Knights of St. John International, a fraternal Catholic organization founded in the United States

== See also ==
- Knights of Malta (disambiguation)
