= In hoc signo vinces =

Latin motto

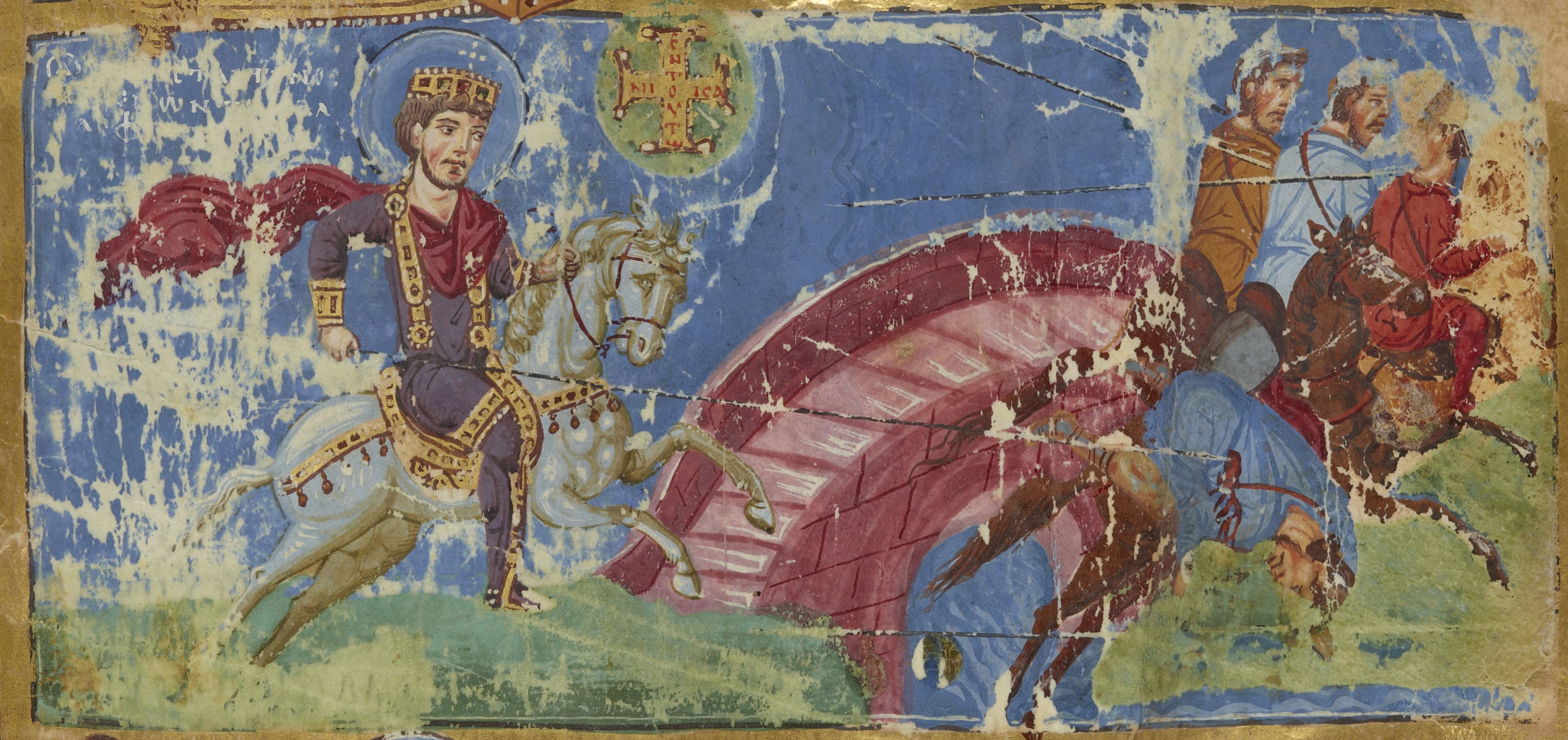
Detail from a 9th-century Byzantine manuscript, depicting Constantine defeating Maxentius at the Battle of the Milvian Bridge; the vision of Constantine is a Greek cross with ἐν τούτῳ νίκα written on it.

"In hoc signo vinces" (Note: Classical Latin: [ɪn ˈhoːk ˈsɪŋnoː ˈwɪŋkeːs], Ecclesiastical Latin: [in ˈɔk ˈsiɲɲo ˈvintʃes].) is a Latin phrase often translated into English as "In this sign thou shalt conquer." Alternately, it is sometimes translated as "In this sign, be victorious," along with other similar translations. It is a loose rendering of the Greek phrase "Ἐν τούτῳ νίκα (En toútō níka)", (Note: Attic Greek: [en tǔːtɔː(i̯) nǐːkaː], Koine Greek: [en ˈtuto ˈnika], Modern Greek: [en ˈduto ˈnika].) lit. 'In this, be victorious.' Either variant originates from a religious vision by Constantine the Great that precipitated the Christianization of Rome, with the 'sign' referring to either a Chi-Rho or a Christian Cross. (Note: According to the later author Eusebius, the phrase itself was inscribed on a cross Constantine the Great saw in a vision; but according to the contemporary author Lactantius, Constantine was directed in a dream to use the Chi-Rho on the shields of his soldiers for the Battle of the Milvian Bridge, and according to Eusebius, Constantine was also directed in a dream the following night to use the Chi-Rho for his labarum standard.)

== History ==
Lucius Caecilius Firmianus Lactantius (generally known as Lactantius) was an early Christian author (c. 240 – c. 320) who became an advisor to the first Christian Roman emperor, Constantine I (and tutor to his son), guiding the Emperor's religious policy as it developed during his reign. His work De Mortibus Persecutorum is apologetic in nature, but has been treated as a work of history by Christian writers. In it, Lactantius preserves the story of Constantine's vision of the Chi Rho before his conversion to Christianity. The full text is found in only one manuscript, which bears the title Lucii Caecilii liber ad Donatum Confessorem de Mortibus Persecutorum.

The bishop Eusebius of Caesaria, a historian, states that Constantine was marching with his army (Eusebius does not specify the actual location of the event, but it is clearly not in the camp at Rome), when he looked up to the sun and saw a cross of light above it, and with it the Greek words "(ἐν) τούτῳ νίκα" ("In this, be victorious"), a phrase often rendered into Latin as in hoc signo vinces ("in this sign, you will conquer").

At first, Constantine did not know the meaning of the apparition, but on the following night, he had a dream in which Christ explained to him that he should use the sign of the cross against his enemies. Eusebius then continues to describe the Labarum, the military standard used by Constantine in his later wars against Licinius, showing the Chi-Rho sign. The accounts by Lactantius and Eusebius, though not entirely consistent, have been connected to the Battle of the Milvian Bridge (312 AD), merging into a popular notion of Constantine seeing the Chi-Rho sign on the evening before the battle.

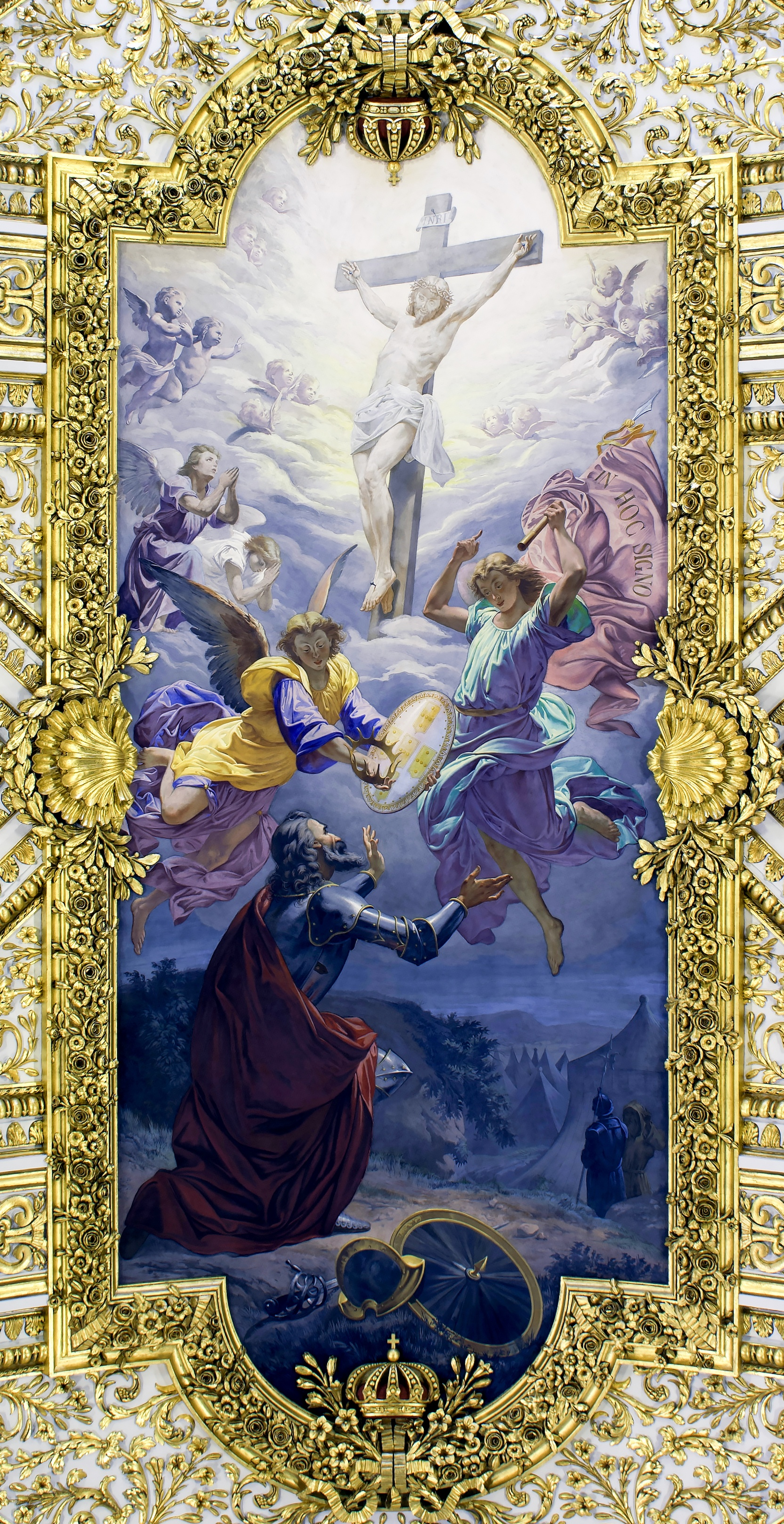
Ceiling of the Church of Saint Anthony of the Portuguese, in Rome, depicting the Miracle at the Battle of Ourique.

The Kingdom of Portugal had used this motto since 1139, after the Miracle at the Battle of Ourique, when the first Portuguese king, D. Afonso Henriques, before his battle against the Moorish King Ali ibn Yusuf, experienced a similar miracle to Constantine's. The miracle was later famously retold through the written epic poem Os Lusíadas.

The phrase appears prominently placed as a motto on a ribbon unfurled with a passion cross to its left, beneath a window over the Scala Regia, adjacent to the equestrian statue of Emperor Constantine, in the Vatican. Emperors and other monarchs, having paid respects to the Pope, descended the Scala Regia, and would observe the light shining down through the window, with the motto, reminiscent of Constantine's vision, and be reminded to follow the Cross.

== Cultural usage ==
- The phrase, in both Latin and Greek, is a motto found on select Late Roman and Byzantine coins (e.g., from specific coins of the later emperor and usurper Vetranio, although written as "Hoc signo victor eris" (lit. 'With this sign, victor you will be'), and later from certain folles of Constans II).
- In the fifth century, when the Kingdom of Aksum in Ethiopia was christianised, the king MHDYS imitated Constantine's motto, with coins minted in Ge'ez saying "With this cross you shall conquer" (unvocalized Ge'ez: +በዘ+መወአ+በመሰቀለ, romanized: Bz mwʾ bmsql)
- Russian version of the motto adopted by the Russian State declared by the White Army during the Russian Civil War.
- Inscribed on the banner of the Sanfedismo in 1799
- Inscribed in Greek on the flag (obverse side) of the Sacred Band of the Greek War of Independence
- Part of the trademark for Pall Mall cigarettes: "PALL MALL IN HOC SIGNO VINCES 'WHEREVER PARTICULAR PEOPLE CONGREGATE'".
- It is the public motto of the English Defence League, emblazoned around the group's logo.
- It is the motto on most regimental flags of the Irish Brigade (France).
- It is the official motto of the World Famous Bomber Barons 23D Bomb Squadron, Minot AFB, ND.
- It was the motto of the Sherbrooke Regiment, which is perpetuated by the Sherbrooke Hussars, a Canadian reserve regiment
- It is the motto on the O'Donnell coat of arms.
- It is the motto of the College of the Holy Cross in Worcester, Massachusetts.
- It is the official motto of the Knights Templar in the American York Rite of Freemasonry.
- It was the motto of the Ancient and Illustrious Order Knights Of Malta, a Protestant fraternal society
- It is the motto of the Regimiento de Caballería «Montesa» n.º 3 of the Spanish Army.
- It was the motto of the 4th Guards Brigade "Spiders" of the Croatian army.
- It is the motto of the 2nd Battalion of the Norwegian Army
- It is the public motto of Sigma Chi, a North American collegiate mens fraternity, since 1861.
- It is the motto of the Anglo-Catholic priestly society Societas Sanctae Crucis (Society of the Holy Cross).

== See also ==
- List of Latin phrases

== General and cited sources ==
- Eusebius (1868). "1.28". Βίος Κωνσταντίνου [Vita Constantini] (in Greek). At the Internet Archive.
- Eusebius. "1.28". Eusebius – Constantine and the Sign of the Cross (in Greek). Passages 1.26-31 of Vita Constantini. earlychurchtexts.com.
- Eusebius. "1.28". Vita Constantini (PDF) (in Latin). Vol. Book 1. documentacatholicaomnia.eu. p. 7 (21–22 on scanned book).
- Lactantius. "Lucii Caecilii liber ad Donatum Confessorem de Mortibus Persecutorum" (in Latin). thelatinlibrary.com.
