= European Technical Assistance Cooperation =

- Founded: January 1, 2009
- Location(s): Hamburg(Germany) & Cyprus
- Region served: Civil Protection
- Members: 2 (JIA & CCD)
- Employees: >1
- Volunteers: approx. 35
- Website: eutac-project.eu

European Technical Assistance Cooperation (EUTAC) is a project of German Johanniter-Unfall-Hilfe e.V. (Johanniter International Assistance) and Cyprus Civil Defence developing a Technical Assistance and Support Team for an assistance of EU civil protection interventions.

The EUTAC project was co-funded by the European Commission, Civil Protection Mechanism, Preparatory Action 2008.

== Missions ==
- Haiti (November/December 2010)

== Field Exercises ==
- FEX - Austria/Slovenia (May 2010)
- EU ModEX - Germany (March 2011)
- EU ModEX - Netherlands (May 2011)
- Johanniter Fieldcamp - Germany (October 2011) (in German Language)
- Peregrine Sword - Germany (September 2012)
- EU Cold Conditions Exercise / EUCC-II - Finland (April 2013)
- EU ModEX - Estonia (May 2013 - in cooperation with CMC Finland)
- EU CoordEX 2014 - Finland (April 2014)
- EU ModEX 2014 - Denmark (June 2014 - in cooperation with CMC Finland)
