= Ancient and Illustrious Order Knights Of Malta =

Protestant fraternal organization

The Ancient And Illustrious Order Knights Of Malta
- Formation: 1870
- Headquarters: Reading, Pennsylvania, U.S.

The Ancient and Illustrious Order Knights Of Malta (KOM) was a Protestant fraternal society active in Eastern United States and Canada. It descended from Scottish Orangeism.

== History ==
The order was introduced to the United States in 1870, when it received a charter from the Scottish Commandery in Scotland. Whether it had an authentic linkage to the Knights Hospitaller of the Crusades is questionable. The order is not to be confused with the degree of Knight of Malta (Order of Malta) associated with the Masonic Knights Templar. The order reorganized itself under an “Imperial Charter” in 1889.

The order described it in its literature as "a band of Protestant Christian men, bound together by secret ties, for the promotion of Protestant Christianity, Good Fellowship, Mutual Aid, Ritualistic Instruction, and Preservation of a Sound Christian Moral Fiber, which will preserve for us and for our children the Blessings of our North American Way of Life!" It also claimed "to defend the Protestant faith against all foes whatsoever; to ever defend civil and religious liberty; to exercise the fullest toleration and charity toward all men; to practice benevolence; and to maintain a universal Protestant fraternity."

Critics of the order claimed it was strongly anti-Catholic. It apparently excluded both Catholics and Protestants married to Catholics from membership. Other membership requirements included being a white male, at least eighteen years old, a "True Protestant in Religion," proficient in English, law-abiding, and "competent to pursue some useful and lawful occupation." Applicants underwent an investigation, proposed by a member with at least two years of acquaintance.

It had 75,000 members in 1923. In the late 1960s there were 10,000 members, but by 1979 the membership had declined to 2,000. The order maintained the Malta Home in Granville, Pennsylvania, providing housing for its aged members. The building was demolished in 2015.

== Organization and rituals ==
The national organization, which met annually, was called the "Supreme Grand Commandery." State structures were known as "Grand Commanderies," and local gatherings were referred to as "Commanderies." In 1980, there were thirty-six commanderies in Canada, New York, Ohio, Pennsylvania, and the New England states, with headquarters located in Reading, Pennsylvania. The headquarters was previously located at 1345 Arch Street in Philadelphia.

KOM acknowledged twelve degrees, with a member achieving full-fledged status after the second degree. The order's insignia was an eight-cornered Maltese cross with an eagle, featuring the Latin phrase "IN HOC SIGNO VINCES."

The order published the booklet What Does the Ancient and Illustrious Order Knights of Malta Have to Offer Christian Men Today? and the monthly periodical Malta Bulletin.

A female auxiliary organization Ladies of Malta was established in 1896. It merged with the Daughters of Malta and was renamed Dames of Malta in 1902. Its governing body was known as "Zenodacia" and the local units "Sisterhoods". In 1924 they had a membership of 28,000.

== See also ==
- Royal Black Institution
- Golden age of fraternalism
- History of Pennsylvania
