= Johannine script =

Historical style of handwriting

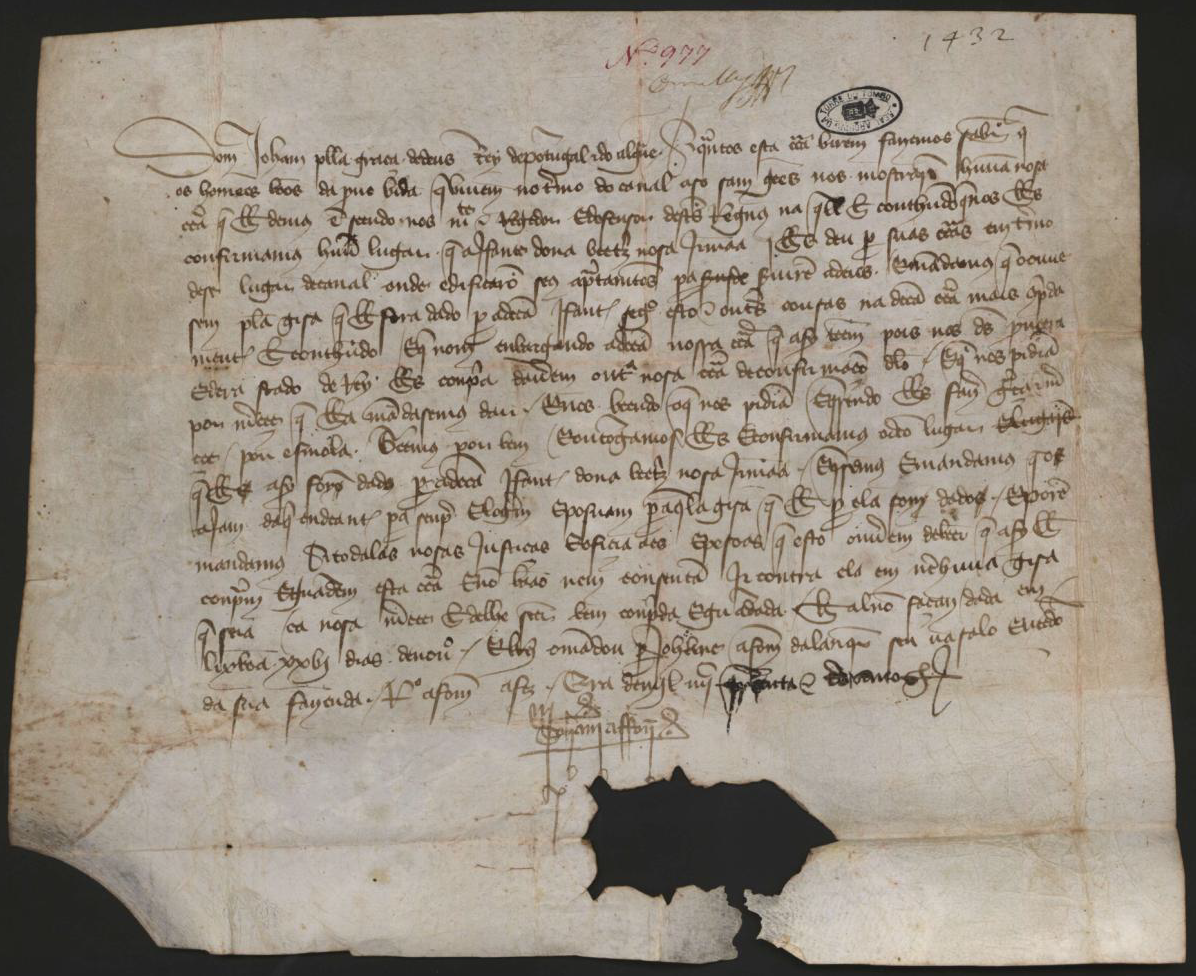
A 1394 document in the Johannine script; Torre do Tombo National Archives, Lisbon, Portugal

Johannine script (Portuguese: letra joanina) was a historical style of handwriting used in the Portuguese Royal Chancery starting around the reign of John I (1385–1433) that was used until the reign of Manuel I (1495–1521). It is, thus, a national variation of chancery hand, a form of blackletter.

Johannine script is essentially cursive, with a short corpus size (but with long ascenders and descenders), letters slope slightly to the right, words are clearly separated one from the other with no ligatures, punctuation is mostly absent, and Arabic numerals are not used (instead, numbers are given in full, or in Roman numerals). The shape of the letters v and b (and Roman numeral 5) are practically indistinguishable. Abbreviations are commonplace, mostly marked with an overline and/or superscript.

The prevailing script in documents from (and from the land that would eventually become) Portugal from the 8th to the 12th centuries was Visigothic script; from the mid-12th century onwards, for about a century, Carolingian minuscule and, later on, an incipient Gothic script. From 1385 onwards, that is, after John I was crowned putting an end to the Portuguese Interregnum, there is radical change in the writing style of the documents issued by the Royal Chancery: this new script (first called "Johannine script" by paleographer Eduardo Borges Nunes) has influences of the French lettre bâtarde and Gothic scripts.

Notable scribes who wrote mostly on Johannine script include Álvaro Gonçalves (fl. 1385–1401), Gonçalo Caldeira (fl. 1386–1426), and João de Lisboa (fl. 1388–1431).
