= Rescue Engineering =

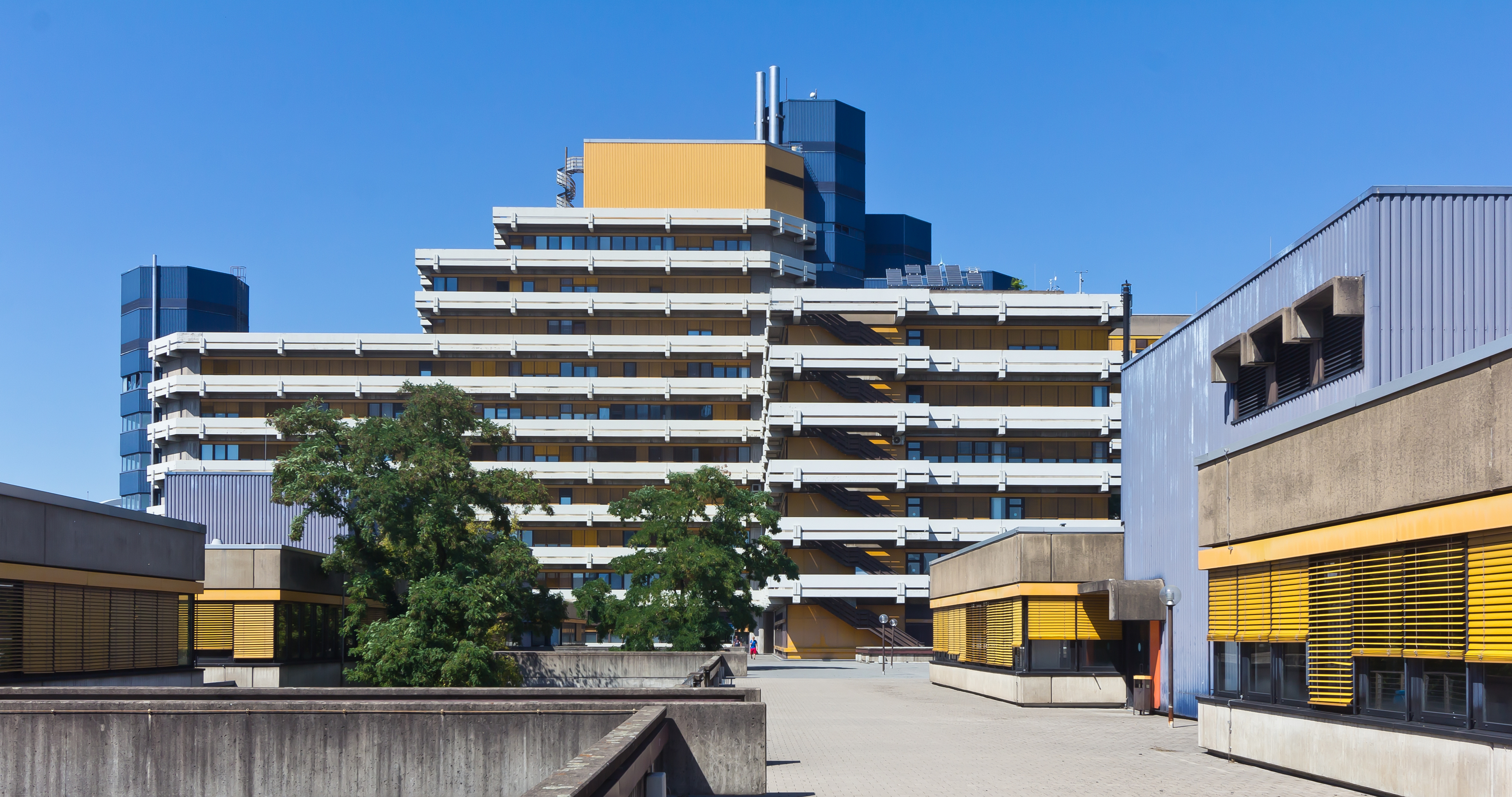
The Ingenieurwissenschaftliche Zentrum (IWZ) in Koeln-Deutz

Rescue Engineering (RE) is an interdisciplinary bachelor's- and master's degree at the Technical University of Cologne since 2002 and at the Hamburg University of Applied Sciences (bachelor only) since 2006, this academic degree prepares for working at fire brigades, emergency medical servicees or other aid organisations.

== University ==
Rescue Engineering has existed since 2002. Rescue Engineering is a full-time study with lectures and interns. Support and many assistant professors come from the Institut für Notfallmedizin and the professional fire brigades.

== Curriculum ==
The curriculum is similar to industrial engineering, fielded in parts of engineering, economics and social science.

The basics cover the subjects of chemistry, physics, mathematics, mechanics, materials science, electrical and measurement engineering.

The economics part consists of business and administration, accounting, taxes, logistics, quality management and project management

In the field of the socioscientifics subjects like law and mediation but also public health, psychology, sociology and epidemiology should create comprehension for special task in the work of rescue.

== Career ==
The alumnus can be employed at professional fire brigades, GO or in the management of emergency medical services. Tasks in fire prevention in industry or commerce can also be a career destination.
