= Johanniter-Unfall-Hilfe =

German humanitarian organization

Johanniter-Unfall-Hilfe e.V.
- Logo of Johanniter-Unfall-Hilfe
- Abbreviation: JUH
- Formation: 1952
- Type: Eingetragener Verein
- Purpose: Medical care, humanitarian relief, youth programmes
- Headquarters: Berlin
- Location: Germany, Austria, Poland, Hungary
- Parent organization: Brandenburg Bailiwick of the Order of St John
- Affiliations: Johanniter International
- Staff: 21,850
- Volunteers: 37,000 (incl. Zivildienst and voluntary social year)
- Website: www.juh.de

Johanniter-Unfall-Hilfe e.V. (JUH; German for "St. John Accident Assistance"), commonly referred to as Die Johanniter, is a voluntary humanitarian organisation affiliated with the Brandenburg Bailiwick of the Order of St John, the German Protestant descendant of the Knights Hospitaller. The organisation was founded in 1952 in Hanover under the leadership of Rudolf Christoph Freiherr von Gersdorff. One of the main reasons for its creation was the rise in injuries and deaths from road traffic accidents (hence the word "accident" in its name). JUH participates in international aid efforts together with its sister organisations in other countries as part of the Johanniter International partnership; it also works with the German Malteser Hilfsdienst, affiliated to the Catholic Sovereign Military Order of Malta. As of 2017 the organisation had 37,000 active volunteers and youth members and around 1,300,000 registered members.

Among recent developments of JUH in Germany is the establishment of local and regional groups that provide first responder services on horseback (see mounted search and rescue).

== Overview ==
=== Germany ===
Johanniter-Unfall-Hilfe in Germany is organised in nine state chapters, which comprise more than 200 associations on district and local levels. It has about 22,000 full-time and part-time employees and is supported by roughly 1.3 million financial donors. The Brandenburg Bailiwick of the Order of St John has been certified as a recipient of donations by Deutsches Zentralinstitut für soziale Fragen (German Central Institute for Social Matters), a Berlin-based private organisation. Civil servants are another factor that contributes to JUH's economic success. More than 10,000 children and youths are engaged in the organisation's youth chapter, Johanniter-Jugend. This youth chapter is a member of the Evangelical youth consortium in Germany and also of the European Movement Germany.

Since 2017 Dr. h. c. Frank-Jürgen Weise is president of Johanniter-Unfall-Hilfe. Joerg Oberfeld is the federal chief physician.

=== Austria ===
Johanniter-Unfall-Hilfe in Austria was founded on 21 June 1974 in Vienna, where it first conducted patient transport together with the Austrian Red Cross with a single van. Today, JUH in Austria is a member of the Vier for Wien ambulance association. Vienna's four largest ambulance services, Red Cross, Arbeiter-Samariter-Bund Austria, JUH and Malteser Hilfsdienst, have been cooperating for a few years now in the ambulance sector. JUH serves areas in Vienna, Orth an der Donau, Tyrol and Carinthia. These regions have different focuses, though. While JUH in Vienna is primarily tasked with emergency medical service, the Johanniters in Tyrol are mainly employed with home nursing and patient transport. There is an acute nursing service A.I.D that is specific to Vienna.

=== Poland ===
The Brandenburg Bailiwick of the Order of St John has been active for more than 20 years in neighbouring Poland, where it has established 21 social care points. In the course of the eastward expansion of the European Union in 2004, the relief organisation Joannici Dzieło Pomocy was founded, which became active on 31 August 2004. Together with the Polish Johanniter foundation (established 2003) it engages primarily in ambulance services, nursing and youth work. Since its foundation, Joannici Dzieło Pomocy has recorded a constant growth, which is thought to continue due to high requests in first aid courses.

== Tasks of Johanniter-Unfall-Hilfe ==
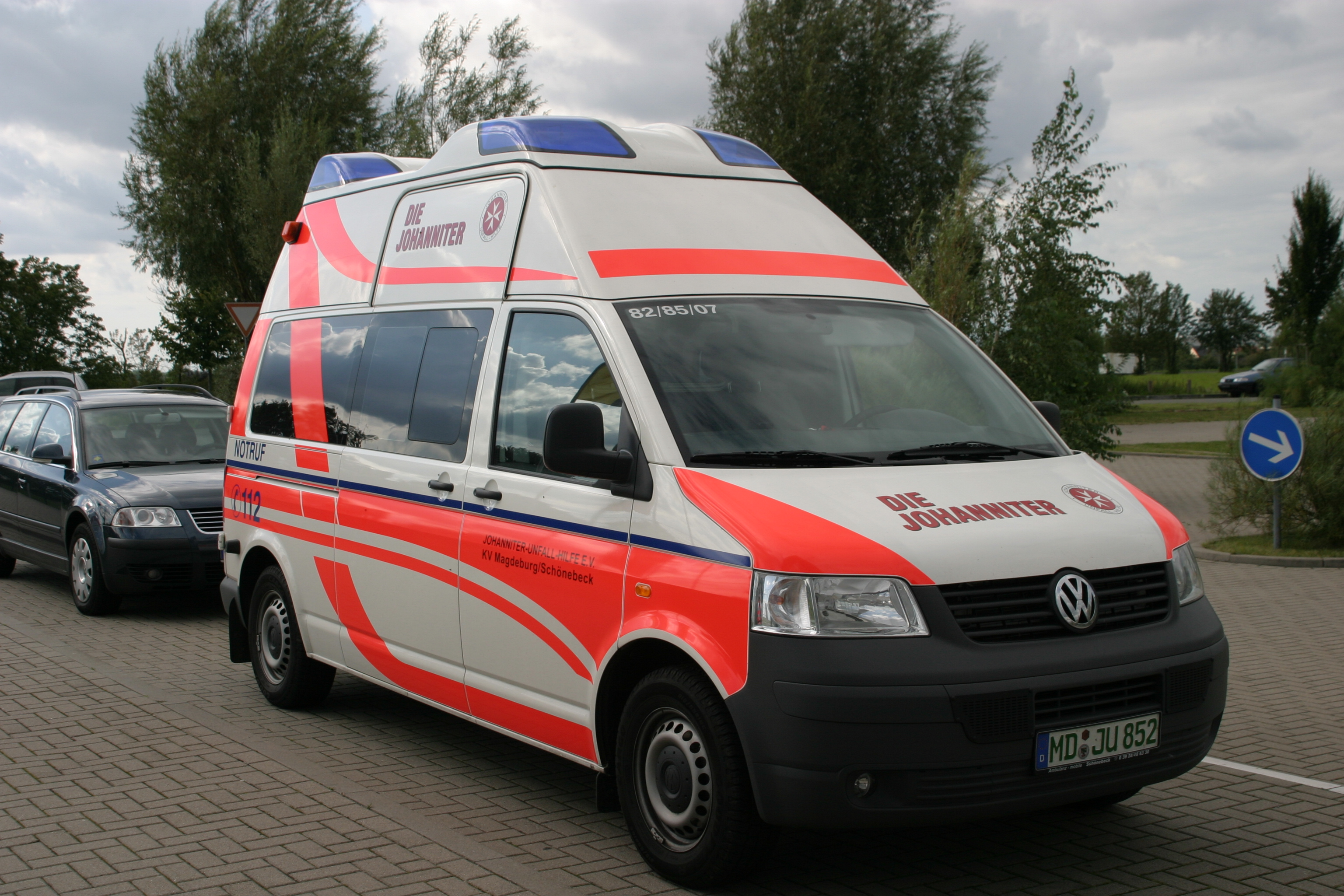
A Johanniter patient transport ambulance

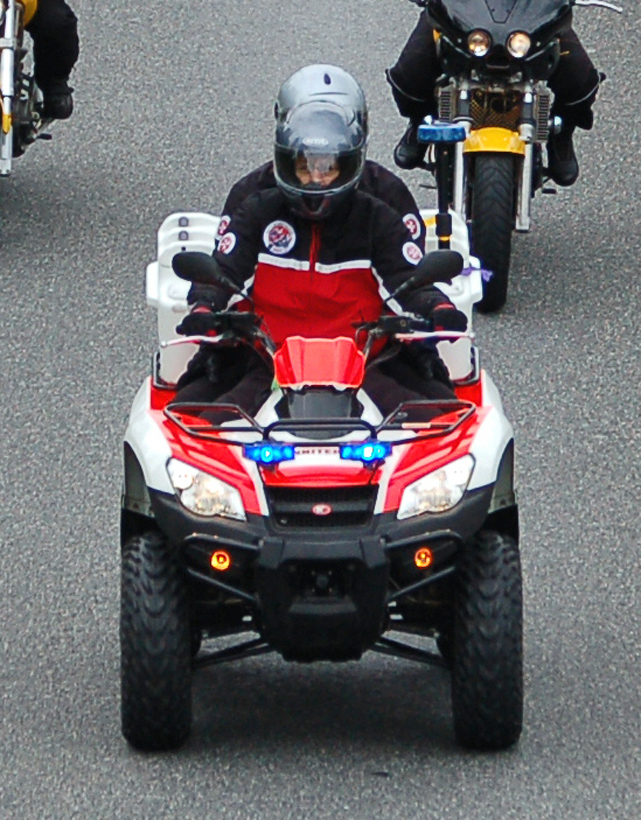
Johanniter paramedics on a quad bike

Johanniter-Unfall-Hilfe has bound itself to Christian charity. As a work of the Order of St John, it sees its challenge in the needs and dangers of the people. The central motivation is humanitarian aid.

The statutory tasks of JUH include

- Training: Johanniter-Unfall-Hilfe participates in public first aid training, e.g. for driving licence candidates, for companies, etc., as well as in the special training of nurses and emergency medical technicians.
- Emergency medical service: JUH operates 210 ambulance stations in Germany which are equipped with patient transport ambulances, emergency ambulances and emergency physician vehicles.
- Civil defence and disaster relief: this task involves the response to major disasters. JUH therefore mans vehicles and stations provided by the federal and state governments of Germany. These tasks are mainly handled by voluntary personnel, e.g. all search and rescue dog squadrons are based on volunteers. JUH also maintains a network of crisis intervention and post-trauma support teams.
- Social care: Johanniter-Unfall-Hilfe provide care for children and youths (also by training student first responders at schools), for disabled and elderly persons. They operate social centres, kindergartens, stationary institutions for the elderly, medical alarms and provide meals on wheels. In 2005 the first stationary hospice was established and furthermore ambulatory hospice is provided. Moreover, JUH engages in caring for dementia patients and the support of relatives.
- International aid: the Brandenburg Bailiwick of the Order of St John is engaged in 30 countries of the world. Medical treatment is thereby based on the experience of Johanniter-Unfall-Hilfe in Germany. This brings about the core tasks of JUH abroad: medical relief in response to disasters, support in restoring civilian everyday life in crisis areas, establishing health care, medical training and skill enhancement, fighting of infectious diseases and epidemia, and orthopaedic treatment for disabled persons and war casualties. The focus remains on basic health care for people in areas affected by disasters and otherwise aggrieved regions of the world. Together with Cyprus Civil Defense the European Technical Assistance Cooperation is formed. Its purpose is to operate a Technical Assistance and Support Team.

Johanniter-Unfall-Hilfe e.V. is a registered charity association in accordance with German law. It is an association within Diakonisches Werk of the Evangelical Church in Germany and is an acknowledged voluntary relief organization in accordance with article 26 the first Geneva Convention of 12 August 1949.

== See also ==
- St. John Ambulance
