= Malteser Hilfsdienst e.V. =

Catholic relief and social service organisation in Germany

Malteser Hilfsdienst
- Malteser Hilfsdienst e.V.
- Abbreviation: MHD
- Formation: 1953
- Type: Non-profit
- Purpose: First aid, civil protection, social and health services
- Headquarters: Cologne, Germany
- Region served: Germany
- Website: Official website

Malteser Hilfsdienst e.V. is a Catholic relief and social service organisation in Germany founded in 1953 by the German association of the Order of Malta. Based in Cologne, it provides first-aid training, civil protection, disaster response and other social and health services.

== History ==
Malteser Hilfsdienst early overseas work included refugee assistance during the Hungarian Revolution of 1956 and a major medical relief programm in South Vietnam. In 2005 its international activities were reorganised as Malteser International, designated the worldwide relief agency of the Order of Malta.

== Organisation and activities ==
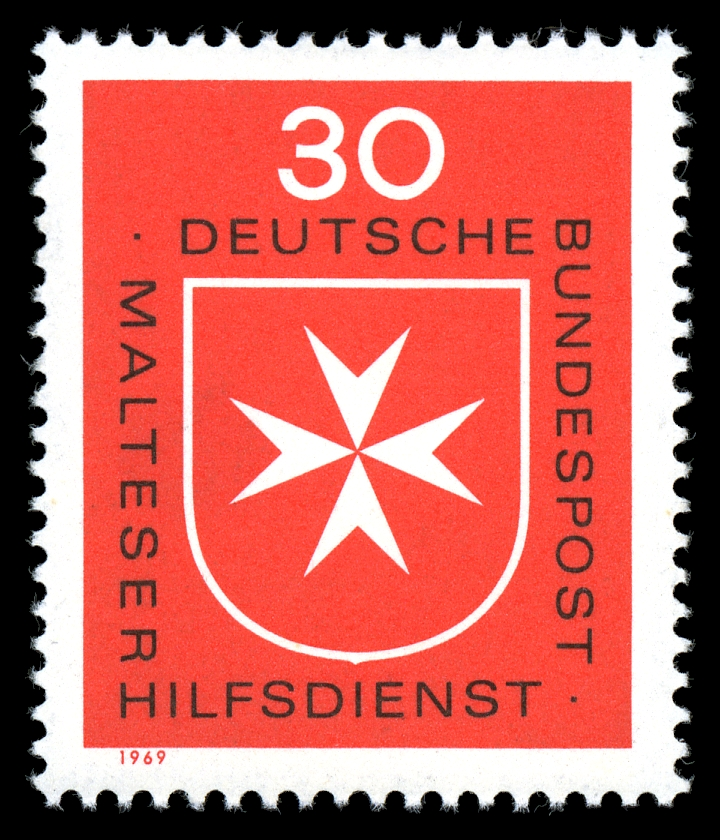
Federal German postage stamp (1969)

Organization operates nationwide through regional and local branches, delivering first-aid education, emergency medical cover at events, and volunteer civil protection units, alongside social programs such as support for refugees, the homeless, and people without health insurance.

== See also ==
- Order of Malta
- Johanniter-Unfall-Hilfe
- German Red Cross
- Malteser International
