= Munich Fire Department =

Firefighting authority of Munich, Germany

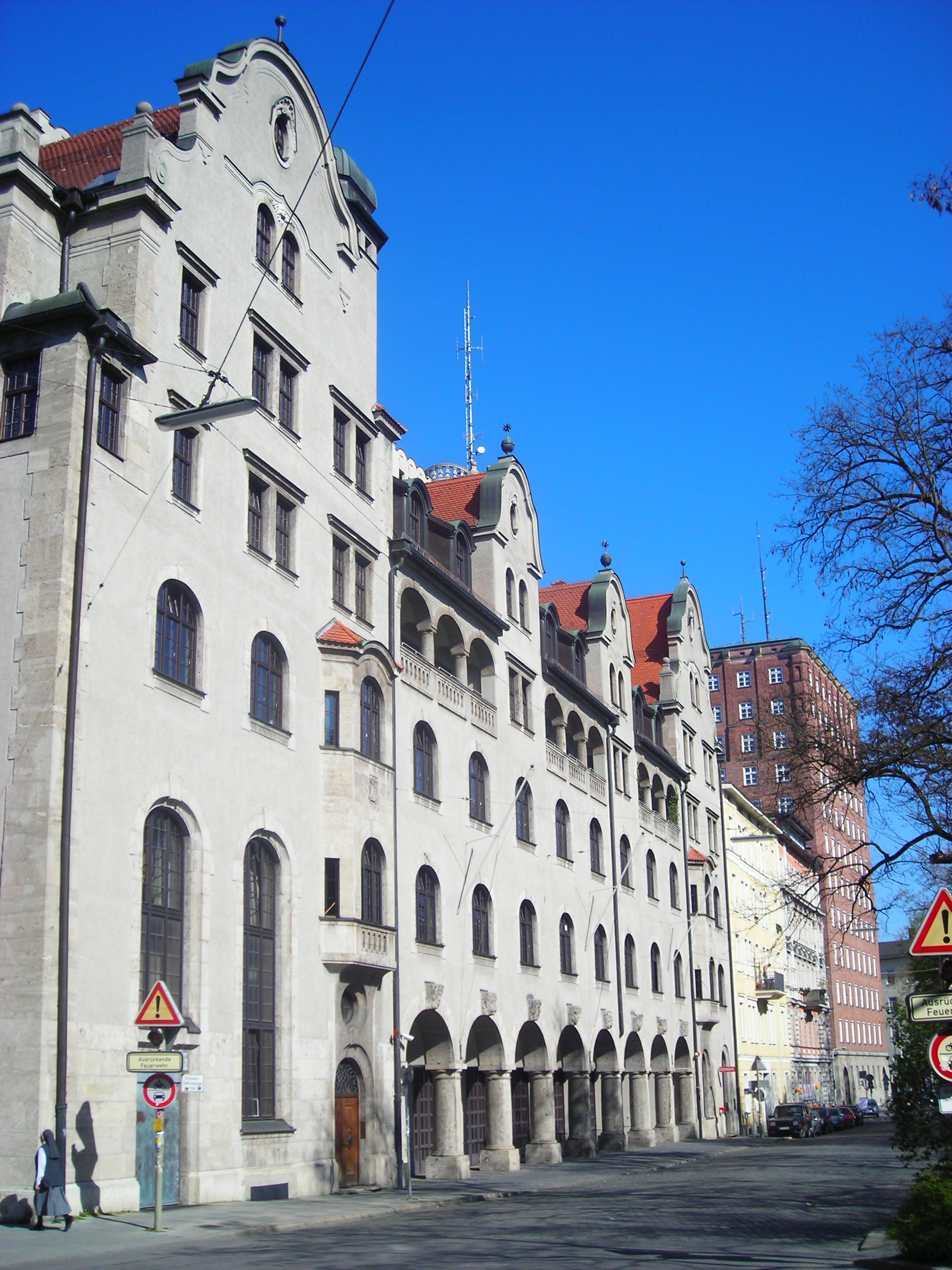
Headquarters/Fire Station 1

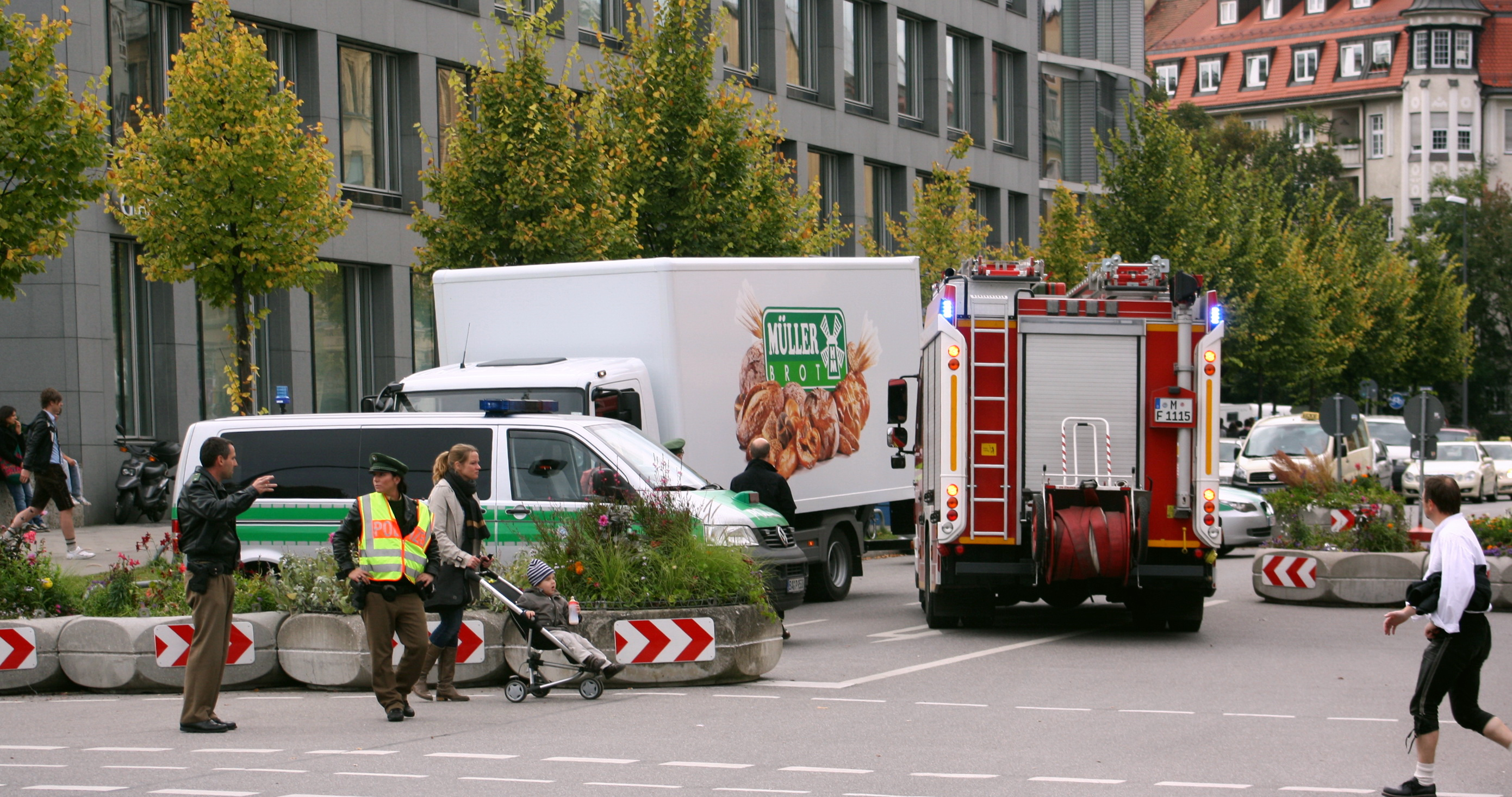
Vehicles (HLF) of the Munich Fire Department in action in the area of the Oktoberfest

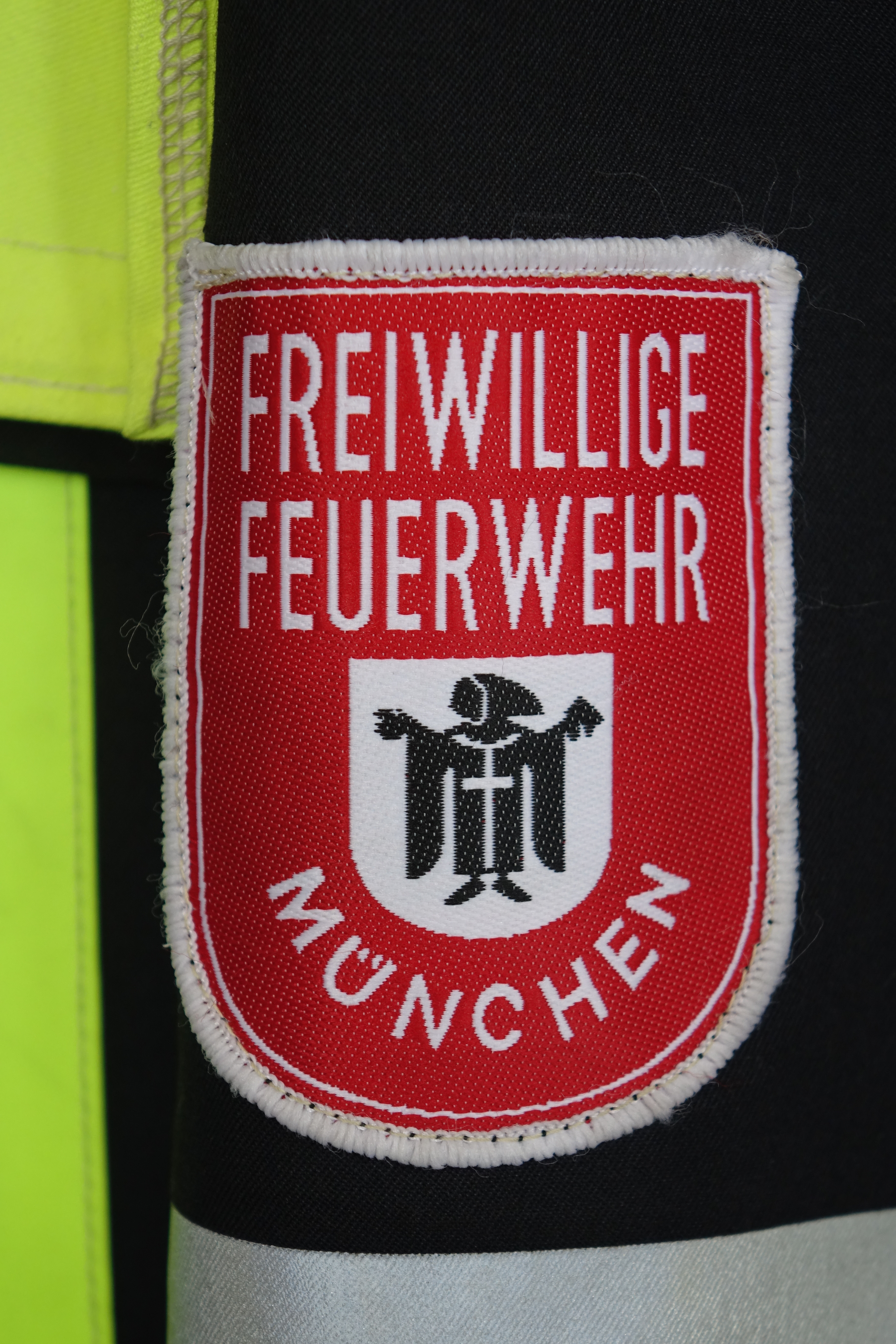
Patch of the volunteer fire department Munich

The Munich Fire Department (German: Feuerwehr München) is the firefighting authority (called Branddirektion) of the City of Munich. The Munich fire department is divided into a professional department with approximately 1500 fire fighters staffing a total of 10 fire stations (German: Feuerwache) located strategically throughout the city to meet the legal aid period of 10 Minutes, and a volunteer fire department, whose approximately 1,050 members are organized in 22 companies. Each year, the Munich Fire Department responds to about 80,000 calls (of which are about 70% medical calls). The volunteers respond to about 3,500 calls annually. This makes the Munich Fire Department the third largest fire department as well as the largest municipal fire department in Germany.

== History ==
=== Precursor ===
As with most fire departments in Germany, the first units were founded by gymnastics clubs. In 1848, a gymnastics club volunteered itself as gymnastics fire department to serve the city. Due to the overall political situation (revolution 1848) and the generally prevailing reservations against clubs, this dissolved again in 1850.

=== Founding ===
After several attempts, especially in the 1860s, which failed mainly due to financial reasons, the volunteer fire department Munich was founded on 10 September 1866 through the work of Julius Knorr, J. B. Sartorius and city architect Arnold Zenetti. A major fire accident on 9 July 1866 in house No. 10 on the Schützenstraße (today Dachauer Straße 40) and the noted lack of necessary push ladders were the most serious argument that forced the city to action. The first commander was the master builder, Reinhold Hirschberg. At that time, seven fire stations were available within the city.

=== To 1900 ===
Through the incorporation of neighboring communities (today's districts), Munich grew steadily, and with it the fire brigade. To which, for example, in 1877 Sendling became part of the state capital. The already existing fire brigades were integrated into the Munich fire department as so-called companies (Sendling VI Company) (see also the section Sendling, below). As early as 1870, due to the rapidly growing population, a permanent night watch was set up in Munich and assigned to the volunteer fire department. Eight years later, the city of Munich decided to set up a permanent guard watch. Therefore, the Munich professional fire brigade was founded on 1 July 1879, their former main watch station was housed at Heumarkt (later St.-Jakobs-Platz).

=== 1900 to 1945 ===
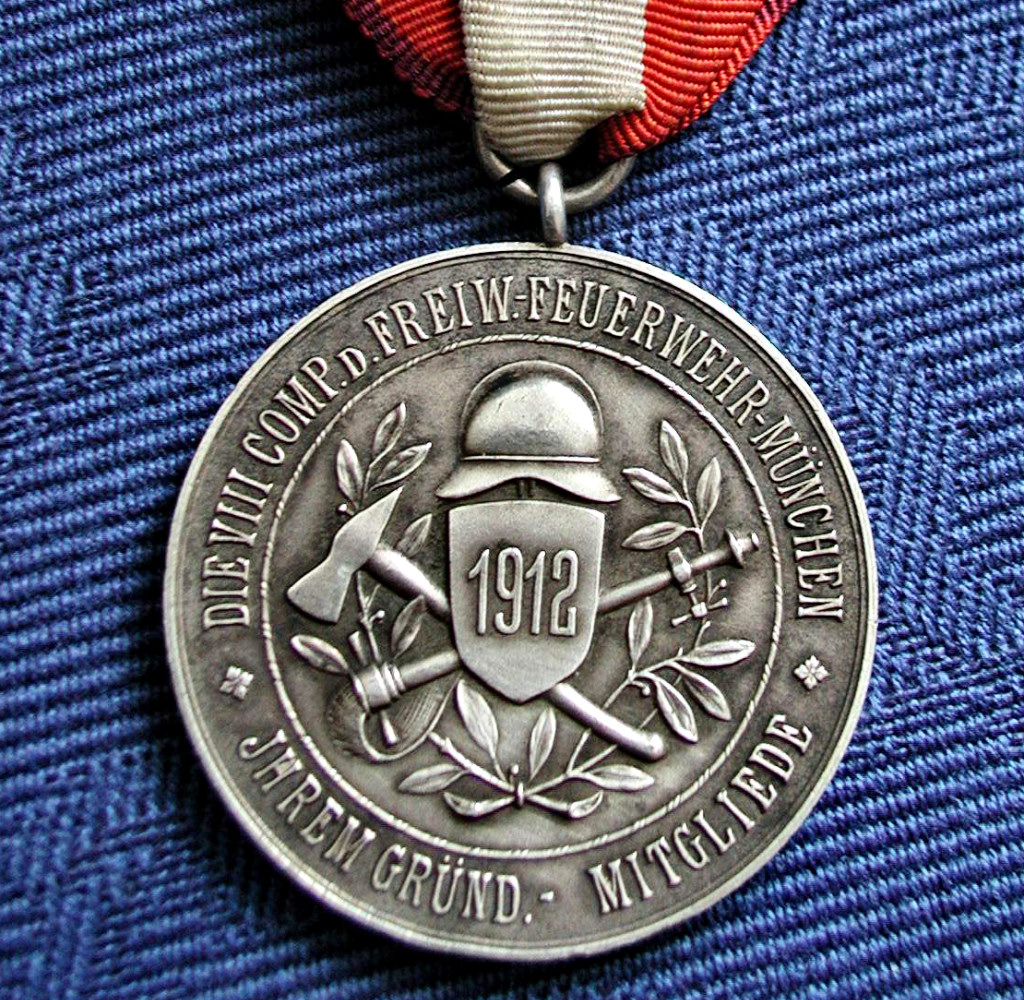
Commemorative medal of the VIII. Company of the Munich Voluntary Fire department from the year 1912; awarded to deserving founding members

In 1904, the professional fire department moved into the new and still existing main fire station on Blumenstraße (today An der Hauptfeuerwache). By the end of 1913, all horse teams were abolished at the Munich Fire Department and it completely switched to vehicles with gasoline engines. This made Munich the first city to fully automate its fire department fleet. In the course of the motorization, thirteen companies of the volunteer fire brigade were merged into 6 sections. By the end of 1921, the volunteer fire department had 471 active members.

Between the war years, other communities around Munich were incorporated and their fire brigades were incorporated into the Munich volunteer fire department. Creating only one volunteer fire department in Munich, which maintained several locations. Before the Second World War, the volunteer fire department had a staff of 1300 men.

=== After 1945 ===
The dense network of firefighting squads of the volunteer fire department, which was created in the city center before the Second World War, was dissolved by the occupying powers, for example the Firefighting squad 3 / company 6 (Firefighting Squad Laim). It was not until 1947 that the reconstruction of the professional fire brigade was possible. As a result, some departments were directly re-established (more or less continued) others, for example, the abbot Waldtrudering (1957) was rebuilt much later. Also new departments emerged such as Sendling (see below) or the Department Center (1967 founded as the firefighting squad city center), which replaced existing units from before the war or restructured them.

In 1972, through the course of the 1972 Summer Olympics in Munich, the silent alarm was introduced, until that time the volunteer fire department was alerted through a siren on the roofs of the fire stations. Since the 1990s, the volunteer fire department is alerted to all emergency operations (in which the statutory auxiliary period applies) simultaneously with the professional fire department.

In the late 1970s, a novel type of aerial ladder was developed in a cooperation between the Munich Fire Department and the fire engine manufacturer Magirus-Deutz, the so-called low-profile design. The series of vehicles built and ordered by the Munich Fire Department in 1980, in 12 different styles, had a height of only 2.85 meters and was therefore significantly lower than conventional turntable ladders with heights between 3.20 and 3.30 meters. As a result, it was possible to reach low gateways and backyards, for which conventional turntable ladders were too high. A vehicle width of only 2.40 meters also provided for more maneuverability.

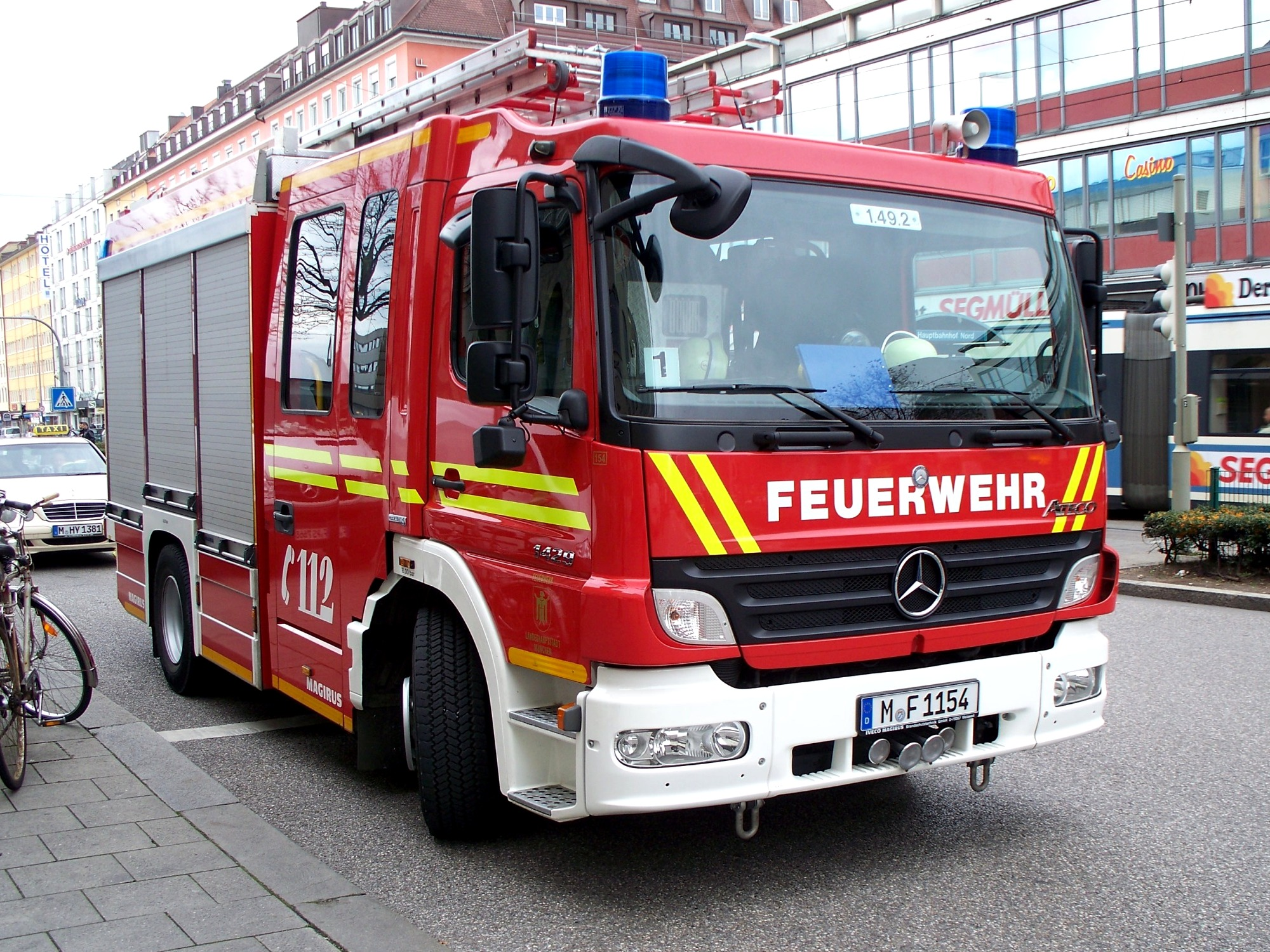
Munich HLF (Atego 1429)

At the end of the 1980s, all firefighting squads and half-firefighting squads of the Munich volunteer fire department were renamed into departments, such as firefighting squad Michaeliburg into Michaeliburg Department. With the procurement of the 21 LF 16/12, a separate vehicle was procured for the FF for the first time, which could also be used alone for a first strike by fire or THL missions. In 2010, a total of 58 uniform aid firefighting vehicles 20/16 were procured for the volunteer and professional fire departments in Munich.

=== Future ===
The partly from the 1970s originating fire stations and fire department houses are to be overtaken in the course of an extensive renovation program. In addition, urgently needed new buildings, for example, Fire Station 4 (see also Fire Station 4, below) will be built. Due to the fast-growing areas to the west of Munich and the unfavorable situation of several stations, there will be a total of five new fire stations built in Munich. Since two existing stations are to be decided, it is expected that as of 2020, there will be a total of 12 sites of the professional fire department in the city area.

== Professional fire department ==
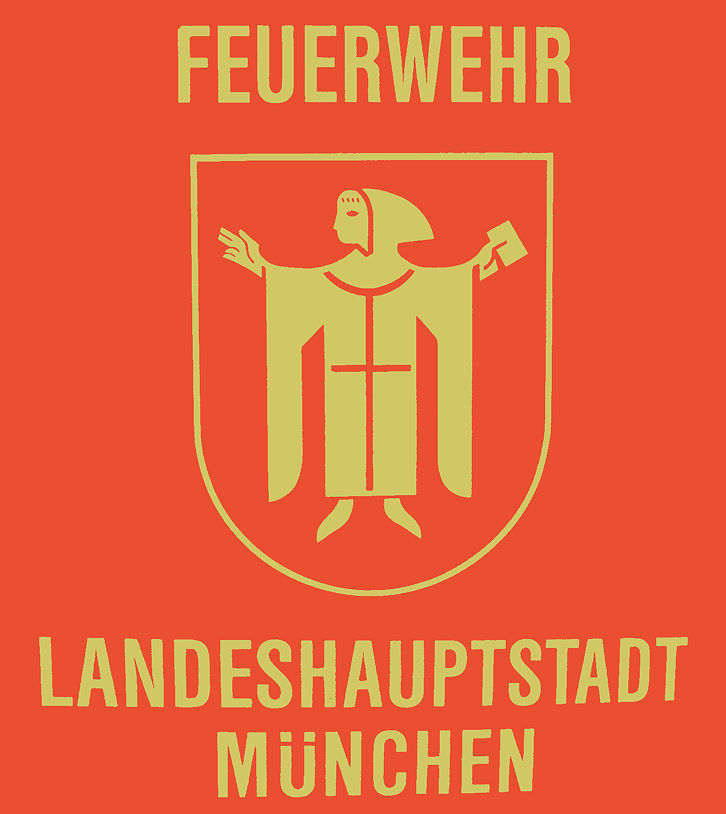
Vehicle inscription

The main burden of the missions is taken over by the Munich professional fire department. This consists of about 1,700 fire department officials. Every day, 300 officials at the ten fires and nine emergency medical watch stations are on 24-hour shifts and in constant alert. They attend to almost 5,000 firefighting missions, 21,000 technical assistance missions and more than 55,000 rescue operations per year. In addition, numerous missions and work from special groups, who are also recruited by the professional fire department. These groups come, for example, from the areas of water rescue, environmental protection, altitude rescue, emergency medical services, civil and disaster control, and the prevention of danger. In addition, the professional fire department operates an emergency pressure chamber and has also equipped each of its rescue fire trucks for use as a first-responder vehicle.

In Munich, the professional fire department maintains ten fire stations, which are spread over the entire city and in which the special units are housed. In addition to the tasks of defensive fire protection, the remaining approximately 600 officials who do not work in shifts (so-called day service officials), in addition to administrative service and working in their own workshops, meet the tasks and activities of preventive fire protection.

=== Standard Firefighting-Convoy ===
The firefighting-platoon of the Munich fire department consists of a command vehicle (German: Einsatzleitwagen), two Munich fire and rescue engines (German: Hilfeleistungslöschfahrzeug), an aerial ladder (German: Drehleiter mit Korb), and an ambulance (German: Rettungswagen). Each firefighting-platoon is staffed with minimum 18 firefighters (1 platoon chief, 1 chief assistant, 2 captains, 3 engine operators and 11 firefighters). This Firefighting-platoon forms the basic unit for fighting structural fires in Munich.

=== Fire Station 1 - Main Fire Station /Fire Department ===
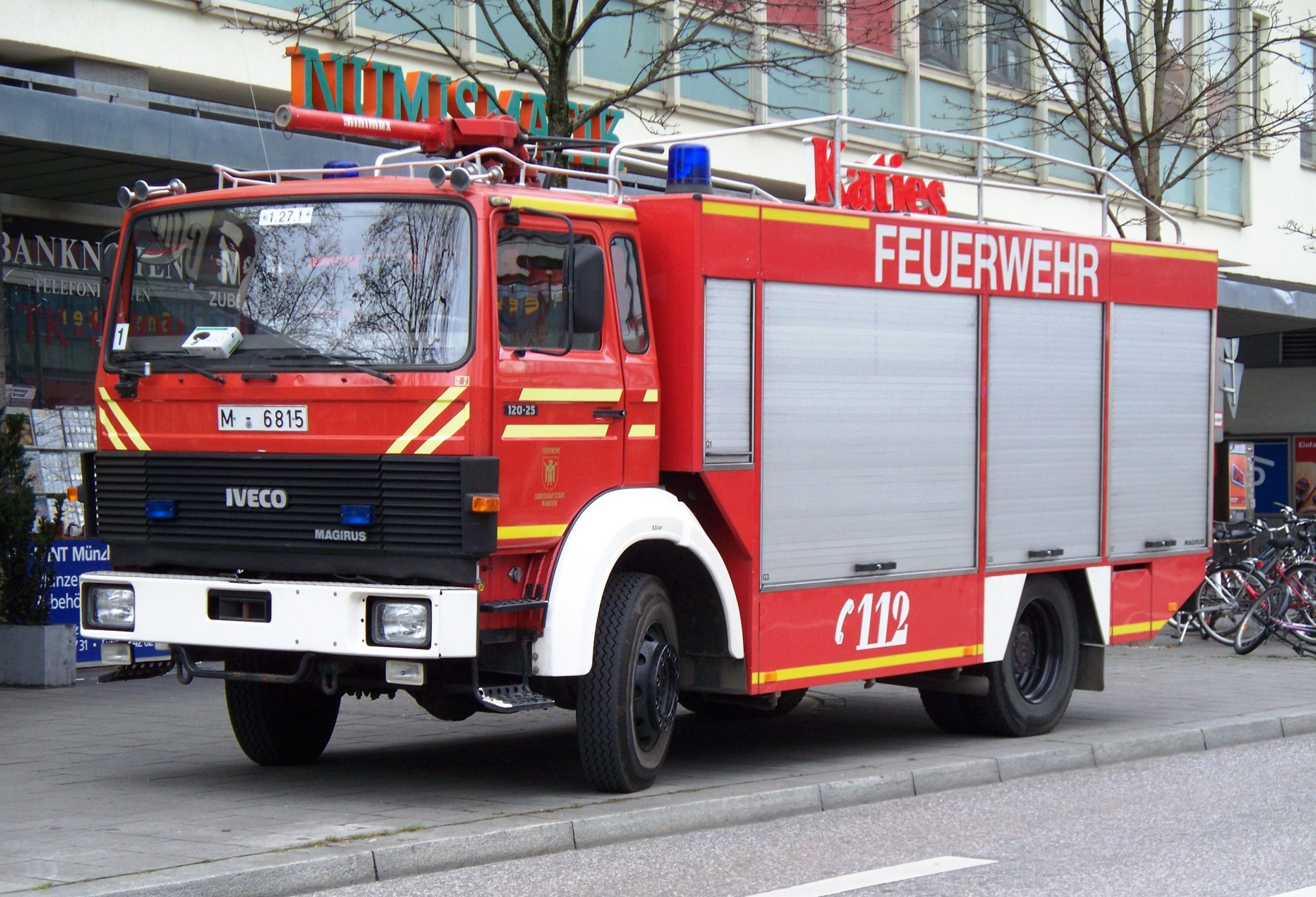
Special extinguishing agent vehicle (SLF) of the Fire Station 1

Main fire station (48.13270°N 11.56950°E) was inaugurated on 11 July 1904 as a replacement for the too small central fire houses, which were used for 25 years by the professional fire department. Their appearance was, apart from minor renovations, not changed to this date. The main fire station is also the home of the fire department of the county administrative department and also the fire station (FW) 1. This is the responsibility of the professional fire department, the volunteer fire department, the disaster and civil defense in the city of Munich. In addition, the fire department also works out deployment plans and release order, distributes resources to the stations in the city, manages the integrated control center (ILSt), decides on hiring, procurement of input material and the maintenance of the fire stations. Furthermore, it is active in preventive fire and danger protection and does the administrative work.

At the main fire station, a special extinguishing agent vehicle (SLF) is stationed next to the fire engine. Here are also the leading vehicles of the inspection service, including the service of the directorate as well as the head of the organization and the emergency response service. Also, the children's NEF, and the newborn ambulance are housed here. The station is also assigned to an ambulance, which is not stationed at the fire station, but in the inner-city hospital.

Since 1979, the public fire department museum Munich has been located in the service building.

=== Fire Station 2 – Sendling ===
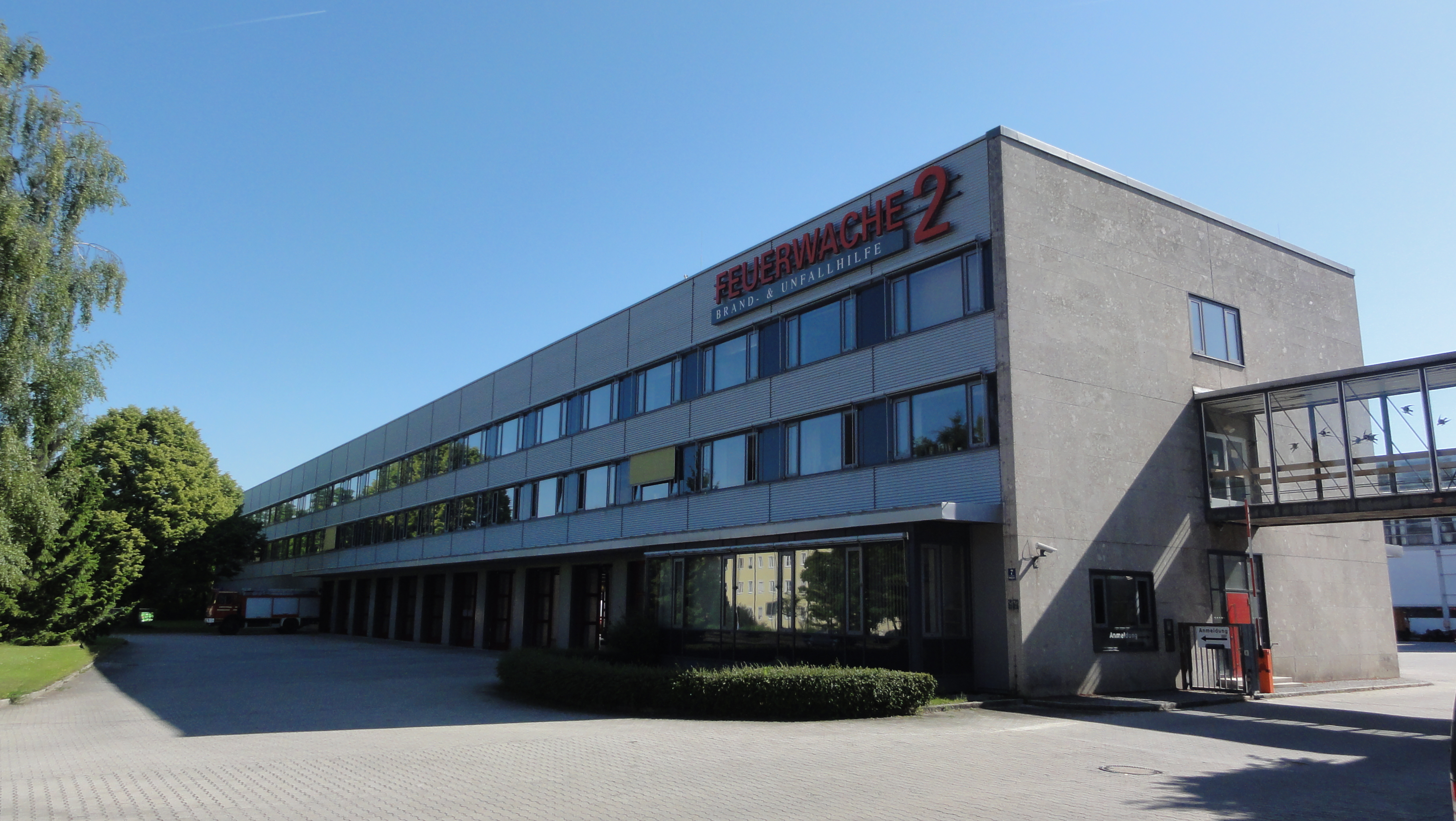
Fire Station 2

Fire station 2 (48.10050°N 11.52520°E) was put into operation in the fall of 1967, after the old fire station 2 on Boschetsrieder Straße had become too small and could no longer meet the growing demands. The fire station is attached to a respiratory protection and a hoses repair shop as well as the fire department school. In particular, the inspection and maintenance of respiratory protective equipment, hoses, jump rescue equipment, fire department fabric and protective clothing is carried out by this fire station. The fire department school has its own fleet, an exercise hall and a fire simulation system (gas-fired).

Currently in Sendling in addition to a fire engine, a device car respiratory/radiation protection, an environment rescue vehicle, a hoses truck 2000, a tank fire engine 24/48, an aerial ladder 37 and two hookloaders are stationed. The vehicles of the Analytical Task Force are also located here. The station is also assigned an emergency ambulance vehicle, which is not stationed at the fire station, but at Klinikum Großhadern.

=== Fire Station 3 – Westend ===
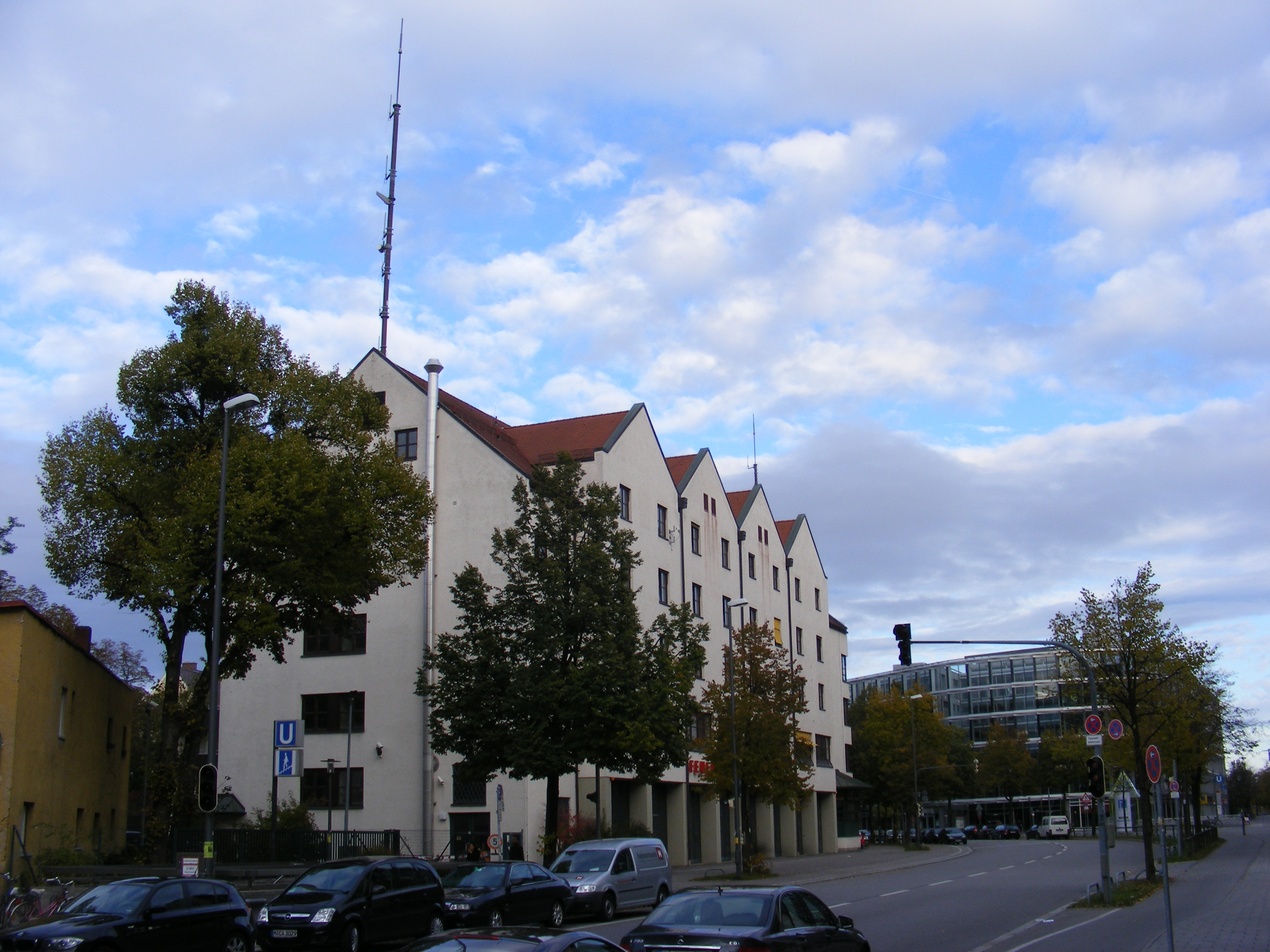
Fire Station 3

Fire station 3 in Westend (48.15667°N 11.55596°E) opened on 28 October 1983, replacing the old fire stations 3 and 8, which were each occupied by a group, as a new fire station 3, in which an engine is housed. The fire station 3 is located in the immediate vicinity of Theresienhöhe and Theresienwiese and offers the possibility to strengthen their station at any time. In addition, this station has a large sports hall and a practice tower, and since 1997 an integrated control center. Since then it has been a group station with special vehicles. In 2017, the control center moved to the new FW 4, so that the FW 3 can be "moved" in the long term more in the western direction (Pasing ).

At present, a Half-platoon (nominal staffing 1/1/10/12), consisting of a command vehicle 1, an aerial ladder with basket 23-12, a rescue fire engine 20/16 and a tank fire engine 24/48 are housed at the fire station. Furthermore, a special extinguisher vehicle, a small alert car and the emergency response vehicle, as well as an ambulance are stationed here. The station is also assigned an emergency ambulance vehicle, which is not stationed at the fire station, but at the Surgical Clinic Munich South (see below: emergency medical service). Furthermore, an ambulance is occupied together with the fire station 7 at the Klinikum Dritter Orden.

=== Fire Station 4 – Schwabing ===
Fire station 4 Schwabing (48.15667°N 11.55596°E) was put into service after two years of construction in May 2016. It is located at the Heßstraße 120, on the site of the former Civil Protection Center, in the Munich district of Schwabing-West, but still carries the nickname Schwabing. Construction costs for the new station amounted to 85 million euros and was planned and set up as a large security base in accordance with the "Fire Department Final Plan 2020" (see "future" section). In 2017, the dispatch and control center of fire station 3 moved into the new building. The area of service of fire station 4 includes the city districts Schwabing, Maxvorstadt, Neuhausen, the Englischer Garten, Freimann and parts of the Lehel. In addition to the professional fire department, which is stationed here with two Munich fire and rescue engines, a ladder, an ambulance and a command car, the KLAF and in the future also with the disaster response center, the department City Center (Downtown) of the volunteer fire department Munich and units of civil protection are housed on the site.

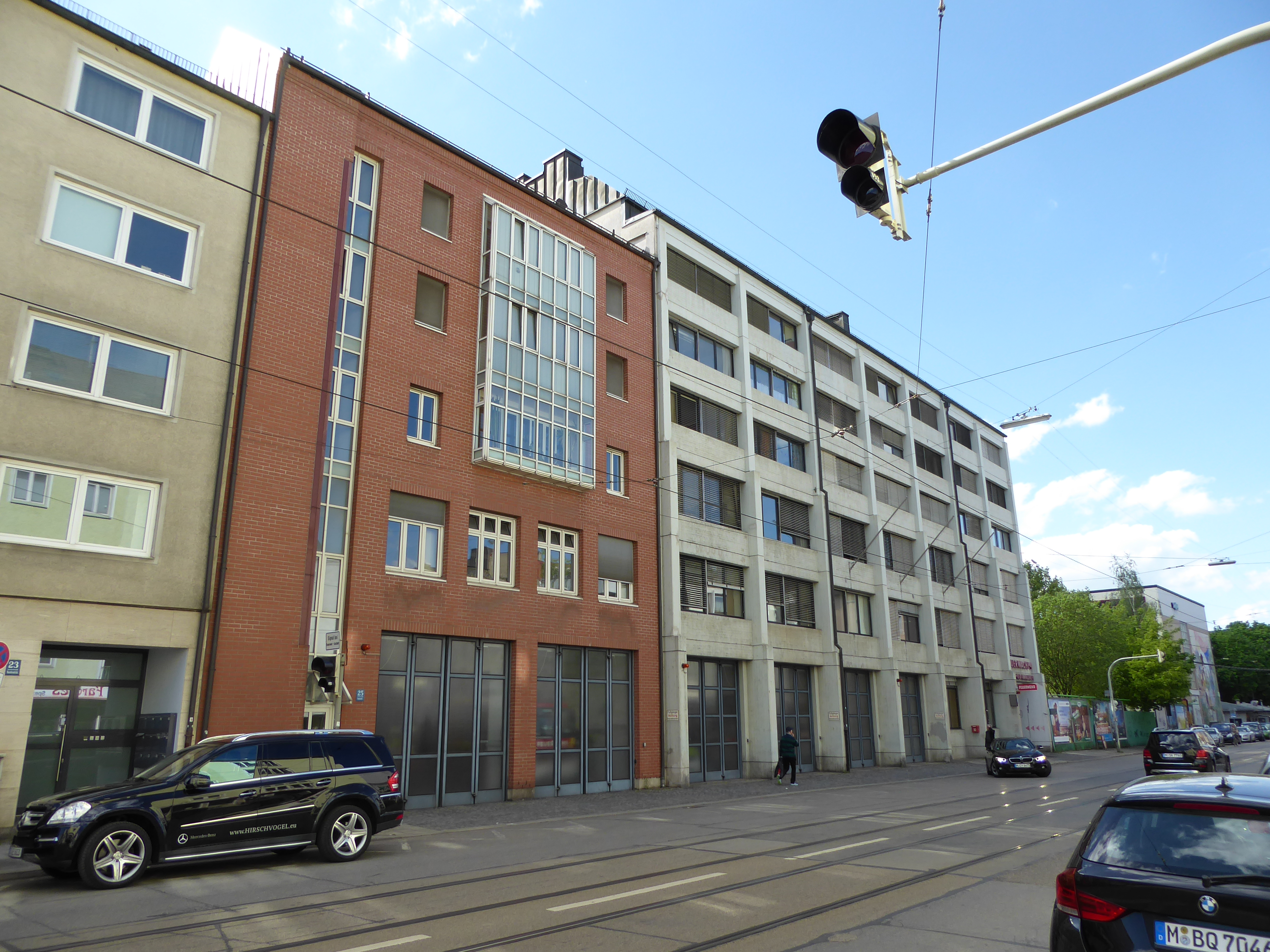
Former fire station 4

The former fire station 4 (48.15580°N 11.57502°E) was put into operation in 1970. The six-storey building housed until 1984, the garment workshop, which was relocated to Neuperlach due to a lack of space. Since then, the premises have been used as a station and continue to serve as service quarters for the officers. In addition, the station is to serve as an interim location for the fire engine 1 during the renovation work on the fire station 1.

=== Fire Station 5 – Ramersdorf ===
Fire station 5 (48.12151°N 11.61223°E) of Ramersdorf in the east of Munich was inaugurated in December 1951 and two years later an extension was added to house the vehicle repair shop, which was moved during the construction to Neuperlach. Also, in 1953, an exercise diving tank was built and in 1964 a respiratory workshop was established in Ramersdorf.

The fire station Ramersdorf is the seat of the technical maintenance department and electrical installations, which carry out construction work on the fire stations and houses of the Munich fire department, and the department of extinguishing water supply. This controls all public fire extinguishing water outlets in Munich, as well as dry fire water pipes in U-Bahn and S-Bahn systems and larger structures.

All metrological, medical and respiratory equipment procured by the fire department have been tested and selected in Ramersdorf. In addition, emergency medical and rescue vehicles are disinfected here. Another special feature of this fire station is the overpressure treatment chamber located there, a diver relay which can be brought via helicopters for use, since the sports field belonging to the station is also used as a heliport. As part of the large-scale restructuring and modernization of the Munich Fire Department, the second Civil Protection Center in Munich (next to the new FW 4) is to be built in Ramersdorf.

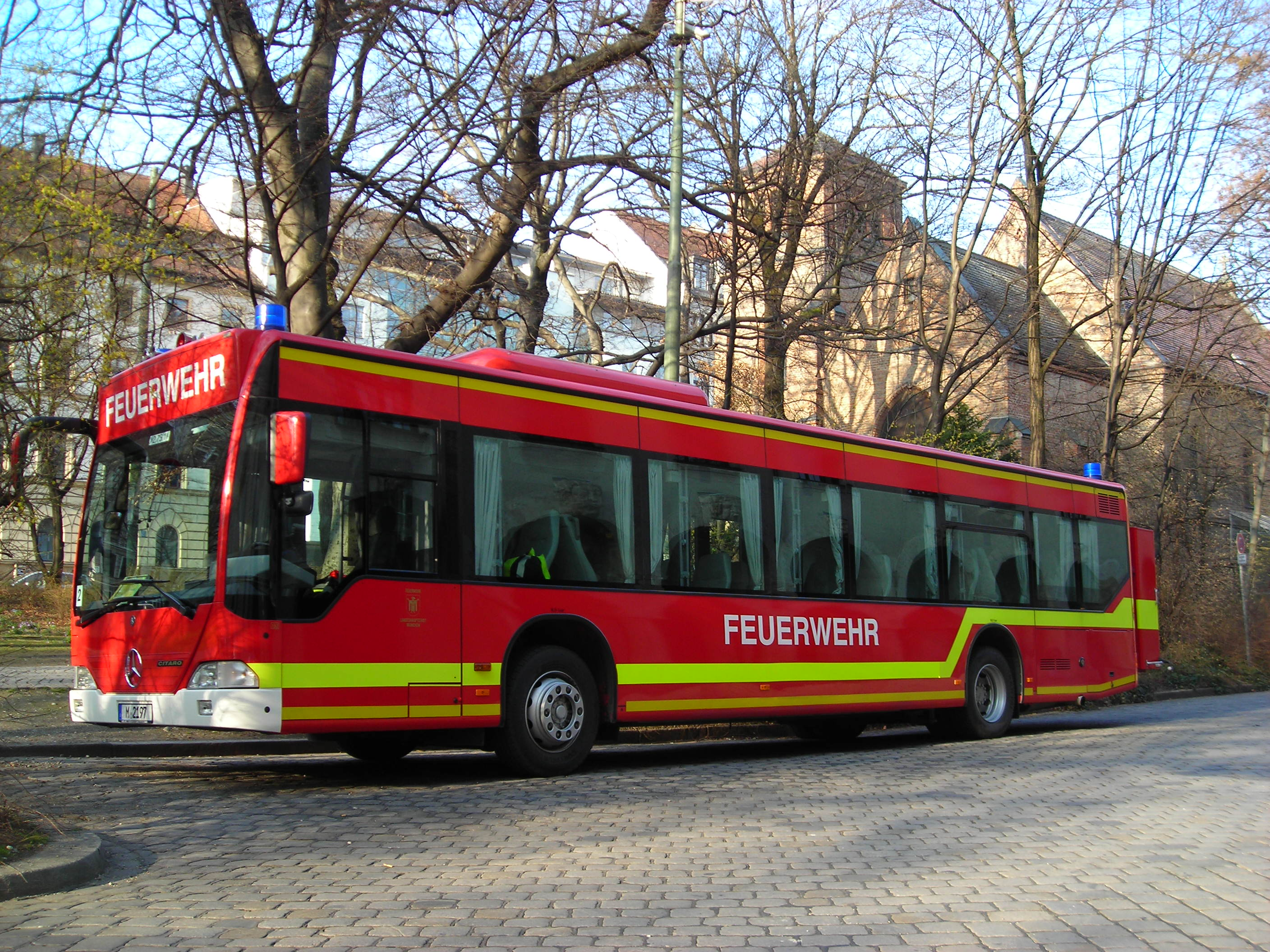
Large capacity ambulance (GRTW) Munich

In addition to the mandatory fire engine in Ramersdorf also a large-capacity ambulance, a rescue vehicle, a water rescue equipment vehicle, a respiratory equipment/radiation protection vehicle, an aerial ladder with basket 12/9, an infect rescue vehicle, various cars and trucks for the affiliated workshops, as well as the pressure chamber are housed. In addition, the colleagues with disinfector training are stationed here, to which are also alerted by certain key words, and are responsible for questions relating to hygiene and infectious diseases. The station is also assigned an emergency ambulance vehicle, which is located in Ottobrunn in the fire station of the volunteer fire department. The NEF in the Bogenhausen hospital is occupied alternately with the fire station 8.

In addition, an ambulance from the Aicher Union ambulance (occupied daily 8:00 am to 12:00 pm) is stationed at the Fire Station 5.

=== Fire Station 6 – Pasing ===
Fire station in Pasing (48.15807°N 11.45307°E) began its service in 1979. It includes a workshop and warehouse building next to the station house. In this fire station, a department for preventive fire protection is housed, which carries out regular safety inspections and also gives advice in the case of identified deficiencies. In addition, the entire rescue medical education and training of the Munich Fire Department takes place in Pasing, which includes the training of rescue workers, paramedics, paramedic assistants including rescue assistants. In addition, first-aid courses and training on automated external defibrillators are offered. In such cases, the fire station also works closely with LMU Munich in the further education of medical students, emergency physicians and other rescue service employees. Furthermore, one of the three respiratory protection workshops is located in Pasing, as well as the special equipment warehouse (warehouse for emergency aid). The latter mainly contains cots, sandbags, pumps, food containers and other material that can be acquired in a very short time.

In addition to the "classic" fire fighting vehicles found at the fire station, Pasing also houses various transport trucks, such as a roll off and multi bucket trucks, forklifts, wheel loaders and a fire department crane KW50. Furthermore, a heavy rescue vehicle, a device car for respirator/radiation protection, a large capacity ambulance, a water rescue trolley for the diver unit, as well as a tank fire truck 20/40-SL and a trolley "Großlüfter" (industrial fan) are stationed there.

The fleet is additional supported by a small alarm vehicle and the emergency ambulance vehicle of the station, which stand at the Pasing hospital. Fire Station 6 also has an intensive incubator for relocating newborns using RTW. Furthermore, training takes place at the fire station 6 for fire fighter divers and diving instructors.

=== Fire Station 7 – Milbertshofen ===
Fire station 7 was procured in December 1960 as a group station and expanded in 1964 to an engine station. At that time, a workshop was also set up, in which the central carpentry is housed. This manufactures furniture and fittings for the professional fire department and is staffed by both officials of the station, as well as other employees.

Housed in the fire station Milbertshofen is a Munich fire and rescue engine, a hoses tanker 2000, and a small alarm vehicle. In addition, an emergency ambulance vehicle (NEF Neuherberg) is occupied at the "Helmholtzzentrum" site. An ambulance (NAW Nymphenburg) located at the "Klinikum Dritter Orden" is staffed together with personnel of fire station 3. Fire Station 7 also houses a 24-hour ambulance (RTW) ambulance station of the "Arbeiter-Samariter-Bund Deutschland".

=== Fire Station 8 – Föhring ===
Fire station 8 occupies a special position among the Munich fire stations. It was built in 1995 on a city-owned property outside the city limits, so as to be able to protect the neighboring municipalities and especially a neighboring combined heat and power plant. The Fire station 8 is designed as a half force platoon station, which also has a practice tower and a sports field. In addition, the height rescue group is stationed there.

Fire station 8 houses a half force platoon (with nominal staffing 1/1/10/12) consisting of an ELW, an HLF and a DLK 23/12, as well as a tank fire engine 24/48 and the height rescue equipment vehicle are housed. The emergency ambulance (NEF) of the station 8 stands at the Bogenhausen hospital. An ambulance from MKT is also stationed at the FW 8 around the clock.

=== Fire Station 9 – Neuperlach ===
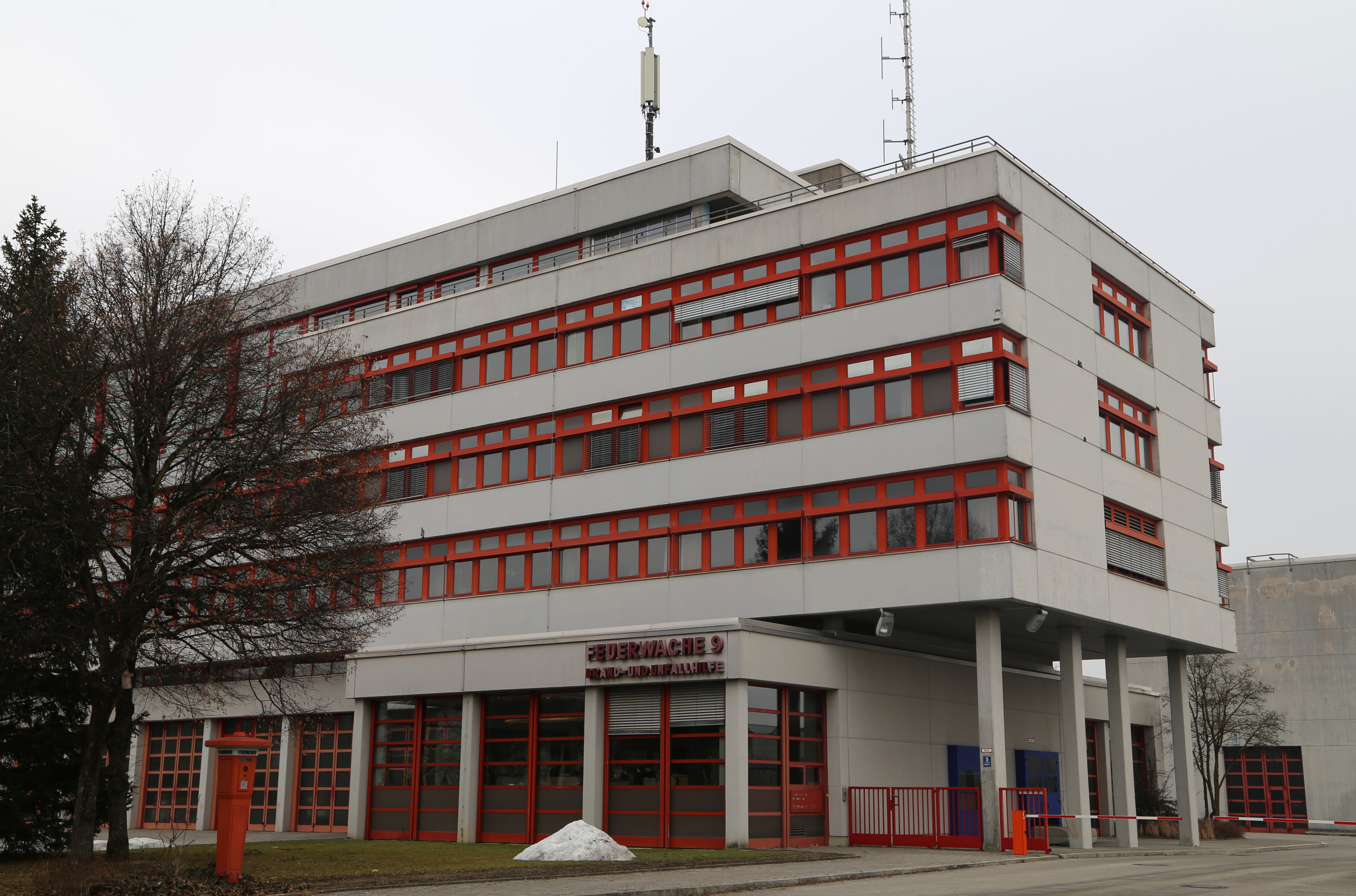
Fire Station 9 – Neuperlach

Fire station 9 in Neuperlach has since 1975, taken over the fire protection in the southeast of Munich located district of Neuperlach. It houses an independent repair shop, which maintains and repairs the vehicles of the professional and volunteer fire departments. In addition, there is also a clothing workshop in Neuperlach, in which the personal protective equipment of the emergency personnel is stored, mended, washed and issued. A department of preventive fire protection is also represented in Neuperlach.

At present, the fire station 9 has a reduced half-force consisting of a rescue service group vehicle 20/16, an aerial ladder with basket 23-12, and a tank fire engine 20/40 SL. Furthermore, a small alarm vehicle and an ambulance are there. As special vehicles are also a fire-fighting crane 50 t, a large fan device vehicle, an all-terrain turntable ladder and a Hubrettungsbühne 53 housed in Neuperlach. The emergency ambulance has been at the fire station 9 since the beginning of 2010.

=== Fire Station 10 – Riem ===
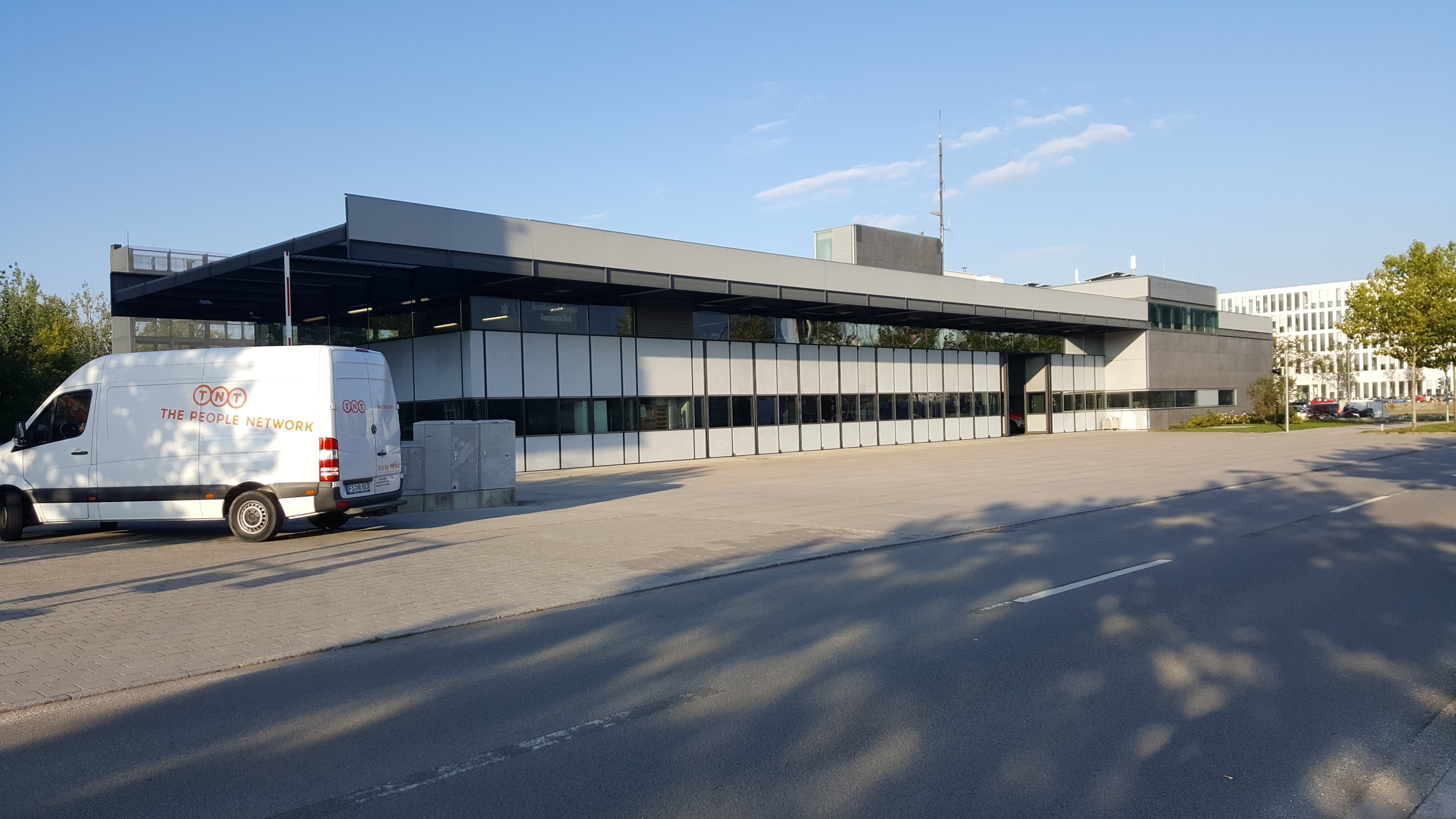
Fire Station 10 – Riem

Since March 1998, fire station 10 is located on the site of the former Munich-Riem Airport. This was required by the new fair and the adjacent "Messestadt Riem". In particular, it also has an exercise yard and a riser tower. There is also a workshop for chainsaws and fire extinguishers, which, among other things, carries out the mandatory bi-annual inspections.

Fire station 10 currently houses a half force platoon (ELW, HLF, DLK) and a special fire engine, an ambulance and an emergency response vehicle (since July 2010) are stationed there. During the operation of the trade fair, the station is reinforced by a command vehicle and another rescue fire engine.

== Volunteer fire department ==
The voluntary fire department takes on a support function in Munich for the professional fire department. It helps out in the areas of fire protection, technical assistance and especially in the extended civil protection. In principle, it is called in for all operations involving personal injury. It is divided into 21 operational units, with 20 located in the outskirts of North, East, South and West, and one in the city center. As special units, it operates the ICT group, the flight marshal squadron, the ABC force and the catering squad of the Munich fire department.

The volunteer fire department is affiliated to the fire department. The head of the professional fire department or the fire department director (fire chief) works alongside the city fire council (commander), which in turn is supported by the city fire inspector and the four area leaders (city fireman). Their command (city fire inspection) is located in the fire station 4 (Schwabing). The Munich volunteer fire department was founded in 1866 as a result of a severe fire with fatalities. It was able to fall back on a fire station, which was built in 1794 and used by committed craftsmen and urban workers for fire protection tasks. In December 1870, additional volunteer fire brigades were integrated into today's disengagement area of the department city center. In the 1890s, other towns were added to the city of Munich, whose fire brigades were incorporated into the Munich volunteer fire department.

=== City Center (Downtown) Department ===
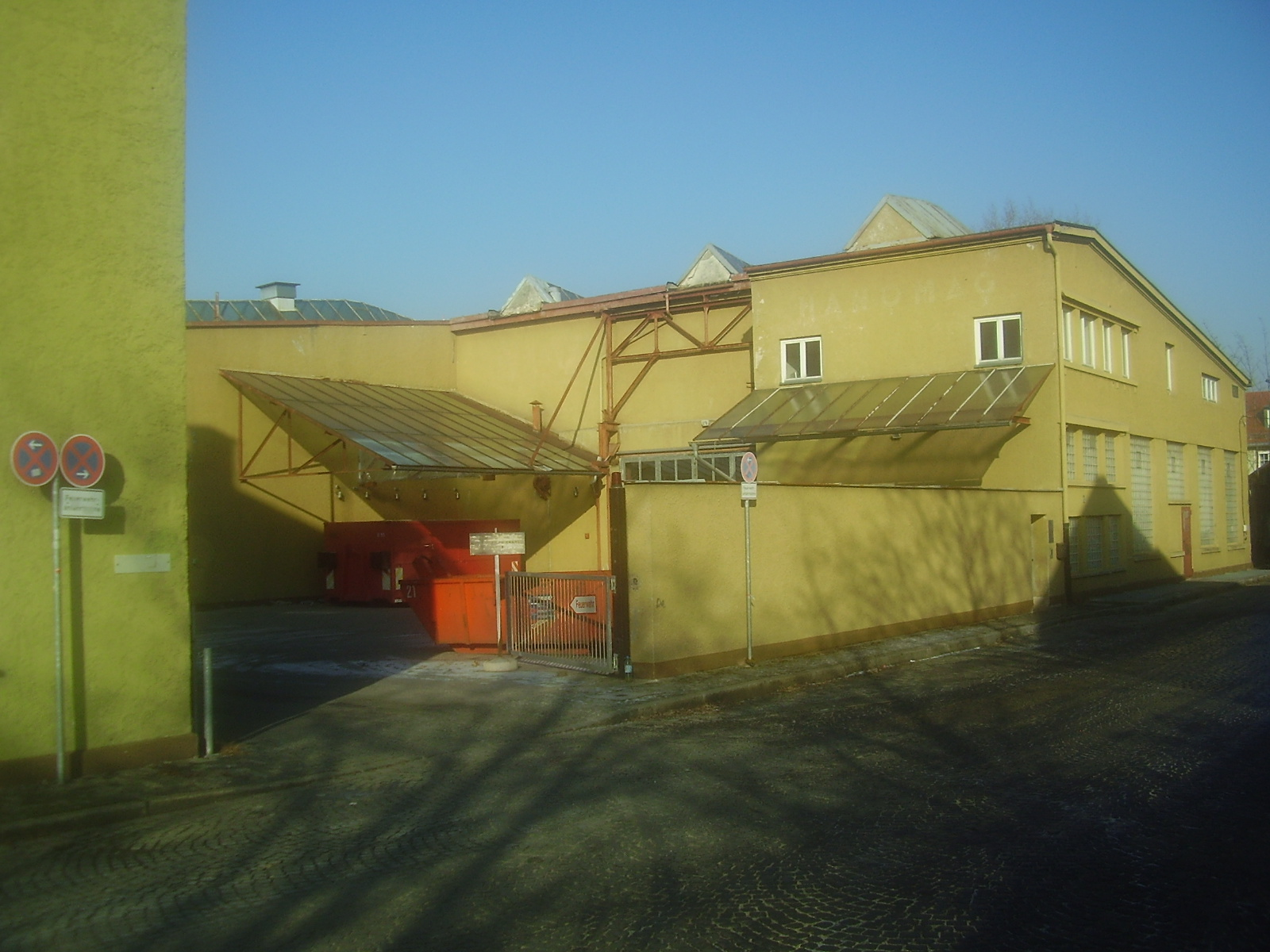
Former fire station Abt. Stadtmitte (former police driving school)

The department city center was re-established in 1969 as the fire group city center, although fire service units already existed in the city center (see History above). It was included in the alerting plan of the professional fire department in the middle of 1971 and could be reached by phone, to set off with their two vehicles. The following years, the already grown group of over 50 men, was additionally equipped with radio detectives and received another emergency vehicle. Also, at the Olympic Games, the station participated in the constant watch.

With the incorporation of the air defense service in 1973 for the extended civil protection, the department city center received a new home, the Center for Civil Protection. However, the department was provisionally housed for several years in the former buildings of the police driving school on Dachauer Straße.

In 1984, the department, which grew to over 80 members, took over the (first) hazmat unit of the city of Munich. The department is directly under the command of the volunteer fire department, its field of operations mainly covers the area within the middle ring. Since in this area all fire stations are located except stations 6 and 8 to 10, the City Center Division is only alarmed on special occasions or when a second platoon (2nd departure) is needed.

Currently, the department city center has four Munich fire and rescue engines, a Respiratory and Radiation Protection (air unit) vehicle, an NBC reconnaissance vehicle, a decontamination unit, a two-load interchangeable vehicle (WLF) with two containers (decontamination of civilians, water transport system). As trailers, there are stationed a trailer with industrial water vacuum cleaners, a light unit trailer and decontamination trailer. A multi-purpose vehicle (MZF) completes the vehicle fleet.

On Saturday, 21 May 2016, the department city center moved into its new fire station on Heßstraße 120. The VFD station is located in the rear building of fire station 4 (Schwabing) and is the first to be stationed together with the professional fire department in Munich.

=== Area north ===
==== Department Feldmoching ====
The Feldmoching department currently has a 20/16 rescue fire engine, an LF 16/12 and an LF 20 KatS.

==== Department Harthof ====
Fire fighting group vehicle 16/12 (Munich model, manufacture year 2003)

The exact date of the founding of the former volunteer fire department Harthof can not be identified, but is dated to the year 1922. Only after the Second World War, which destroyed the structure of the Munich fire department, and led to a new start-up as a fire department Harthof of the Munich fire department in January 1948. This was planned to support the fire fighting in Feldmoching, which also received there fire station in 1950. A year later, the Munich Fire Department granted a request for independence of the fire fighting group. In the following years, the fire fighting group Harthof was further trained and expanded until 1979, when it was then recognized as a department and attained its present fire station. Today, the Harthof department is active with an Assistance Fire department vehicle 20/16, a 16/12 fire engine and an MZF, to which they can attach an e-sucker trailer if required.

==== Department Freimann ====
The department Freimann, with over 35 active men and woman, was founded in May 1870 as an independent fire department and later incorporated into the Munich volunteer fire department. Today, the comrades partake in about 200 missions a year, making the department one of the most frequently alerted at the Munich volunteer fire department. Their fields of application include, among others, a large industrial area, the Allianz Arena, a large motorway section and the subway. Since 1995, with the appropriate indication, the department has been alarmed at the same time as the professional fire department. The fleet currently consists of a rescue service group vehicle 20/16, a fire engine 16/12, a tank fire engine 16/25 and a traffic safety trailer.

==== Department Oberföhring ====
The volunteer fire department Oberföhring was founded in January 1870 and combined in 1907 with the neighboring forces from Daglfing, Unterföhring and Ismaning. When Oberföhring was incorporated into the city of Munich in 1913, the Oberföhring Fire Department was included as a 10th Division in the Munich Fire Department. Their first motorized fire engine, making them equally compatible with the other fire service units in Munich, reached the department Oberföhring only in 1932. At the time of National Socialism, the members of the volunteer fire department were integrated into the fire protection police or the "Wehrmacht", which meant the temporary end of this department. The reconstruction of this fire service department took place immediately after the end of the Second World War, even during the occupation.

After the takeover of the civil protection in Munich there was a restructuring of the fire department, so that the department Oberföhring since then, together with the departments Riem and Trudering, formed the fire department readiness in the area Ost1. In 1979, the department Oberföhring received a new fire station, in which the vehicle hall could accommodate three fire engines.

Following a change in the organization of the Munich volunteer fire department, the Oberföhring department has been assigned to the North division since 2004.

The Oberföhring department owns two fire stations. One of them in Oberföhring, in which a rescue fire vehicle 20/16 (OF 49-1), a fire engine 16/12 (OF 40-1) and a multi-purpose vehicle (OF 11-1) are housed. The other fire station is located in Englschalking in which another aid fire engine 20/16 (OF 49-2) and an LF 20 KatS (OF 41-1) is stationed.

=== Area east ===
==== Department Riem ====
The royal district office Munich country gave, in 1874, all municipalities the order to set up volunteer fire departments. As a result, the local mayor of Dornach-Riem convened a foundation meeting on 22 November at the Gasthof Alter Wirt in Riem. All citizens and peasants of the 398-resident community were called upon to found a volunteer fire department. Spontaneously, 46 men agreed to join. In 1937, the district Riem of the community Dornach Riem was incorporated into the city of Munich. Munich received a population increase of approx. 1000 inhabitants and an area increase of 657.29 hectares. After about 62 years of community and good neighborliness, the paths of the volunteer fire department Dornach-Riem now parted ways. The existing volunteer fire department in the district Riem was assigned as Halblöschzug 19 (a small size fire engine) of the Munich volunteer fire department and equipped with a Sauer-Löschfahrzeug.

The Riem department currently owns an HLF 20/16, a fire engine LF 16/12 and a crew transport vehicle (MTF).

==== Department Trudering ====
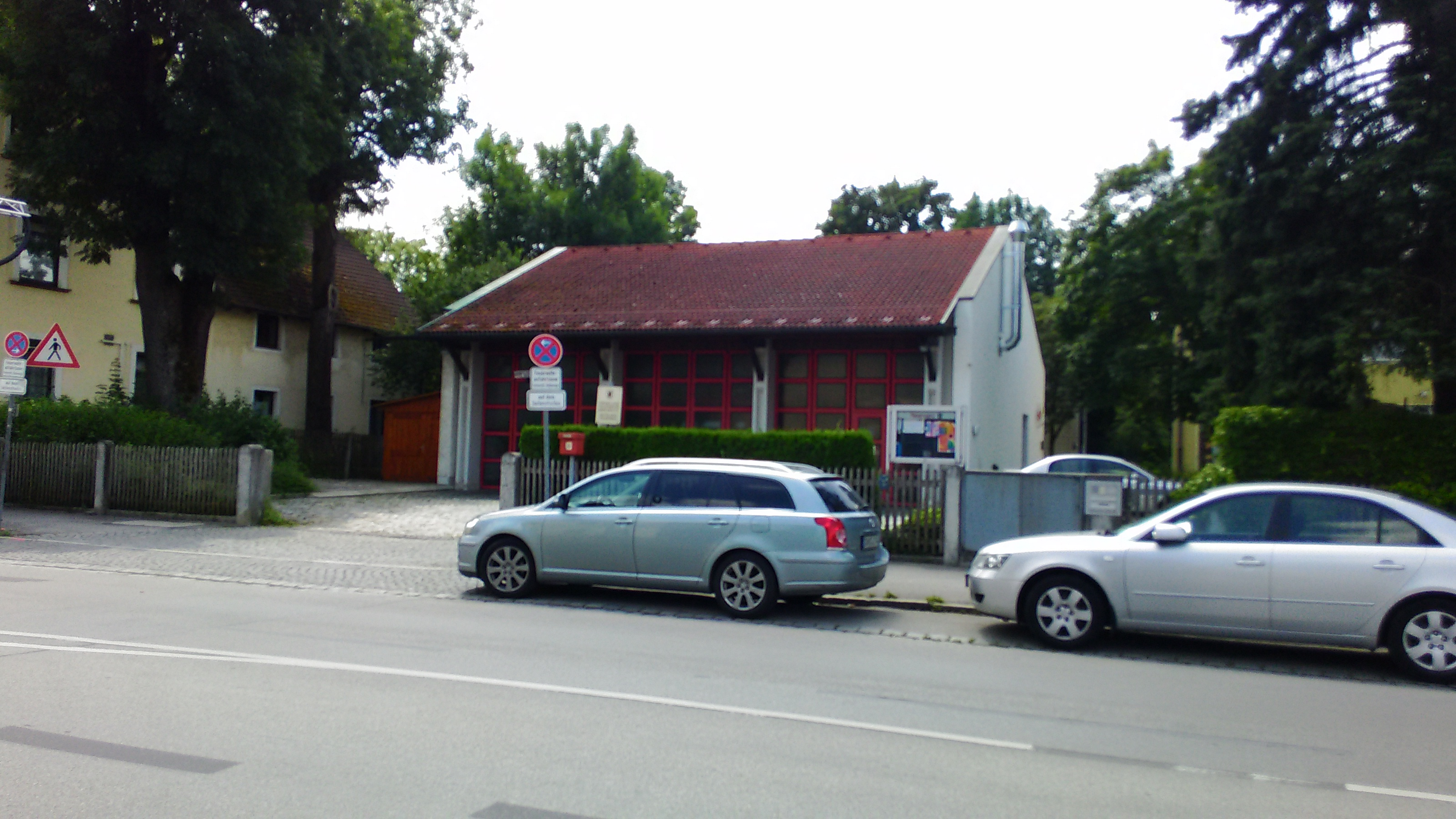
Volunteer Fire Department Munich, Department Trudering

In Trudering in 1874, the volunteer fire department was founded and rebuilt in 1919 after the First World War. At this time, the districts Waldtrudering and Michaeliburg founded fire fighting groups that could support the fire department Trudering. As early as 1925, the fire department received an alarm siren, with which the firefighters could be alerted for missions. A large part of the comrades fell victim to the Second World War, the emergency vehicles were destroyed in the invasion of the Americans. Nevertheless, the fire department was re-established in 1945, so they could again provide for the safety in their area. Also, at the 1972 Summer Olympics, important tasks were given to the department Trudering. In 1982, a new fire station could be moved into, so that the previously housed separately vehicles were now available in one place.

Today, the Trudering department has a HLF 20/16, a fire engine 16/12, a 2000 hoses truck with crew space and, since 2015, a multi-purpose vehicle for transporting equipment and personnel. There are currently 30 firefighters, including 4 women, in the Trudering department.

==== Department Michaeliburg ====
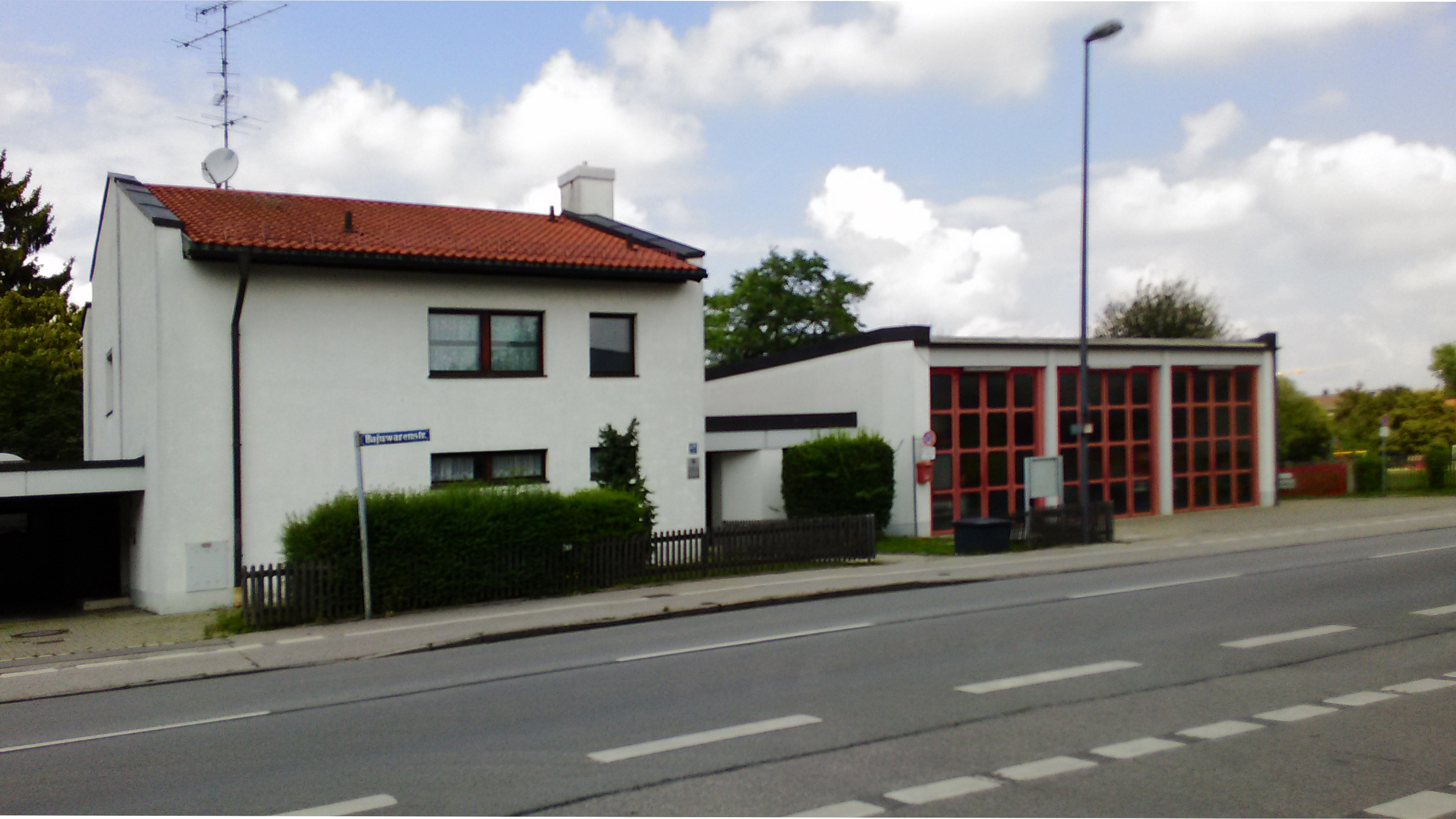
Volunteer fire department Munich, department Michaeliburg

At the end of the 1980s, the department Michaeliburg was founded from the half-brigade of the 17th fire fighting group. With 45 active members, the department, together with Perlach, Riem, Trudering, Waldperlach and Waldtrudering belongs to the East area of the Munich fire departments. With a rescue fire truck, a fire engine 16/12 and a multi-purpose vehicle, the department is called on an average of 90 missions a year.

==== Department Perlach ====
The Volunteer Fire department Perlach was founded in 1869 and was incorporated in 1930. In the course of this, the name volunteer fire department Perlach changed to volunteer fire department Munich, Department Perlach. Today, it has an Assistance Fire department vehicle 20/16, a fine engine 16/12, a 16/25 tanker and a traffic safety trailer.

==== Department Waldperlach ====
The Department Waldperlach was founded on 3 April 1927, under the direction of Karl Freiherr von Stockhausen. After the Second World War, the fire department was reorganized by six of the founding members in 1949.

The department currently owns a fire engine 16/12, a tank fire engine 16/25, a multi-purpose vehicle, and the standard rescue fire engine 20/16 of the Munich Fire Department. In June 2016, an LF 20 KatS procured by the Federal Ministry of the Interior was put into active service.

In addition, the troops were assigned so-called external load containers for firefighting from the air (with helicopters e.g. the police helicopter squadron Bavaria) type SEMAT 900 (2 tanks with a capacity of 900 L each) and SEMAT 5000 (2 tanks with a capacity of 5000 L each), The department therefore supports the marshalling squadron of the Munich Fire Department. The equipment also includes a thermal imaging camera Evolution 5000 by MSA-Auer.

The, after 20-years of planning, newly built fire station is located in the "Gefilde 4" on the corner of Putzbrunner Straße, near the fire station 9 (Neuperlach). The move took place in October 2006 and was officially inaugurated at the 80th anniversary celebration in July 2007.

At present, 41 active firemen and women work in this department.

==== Department Waldtrudering ====
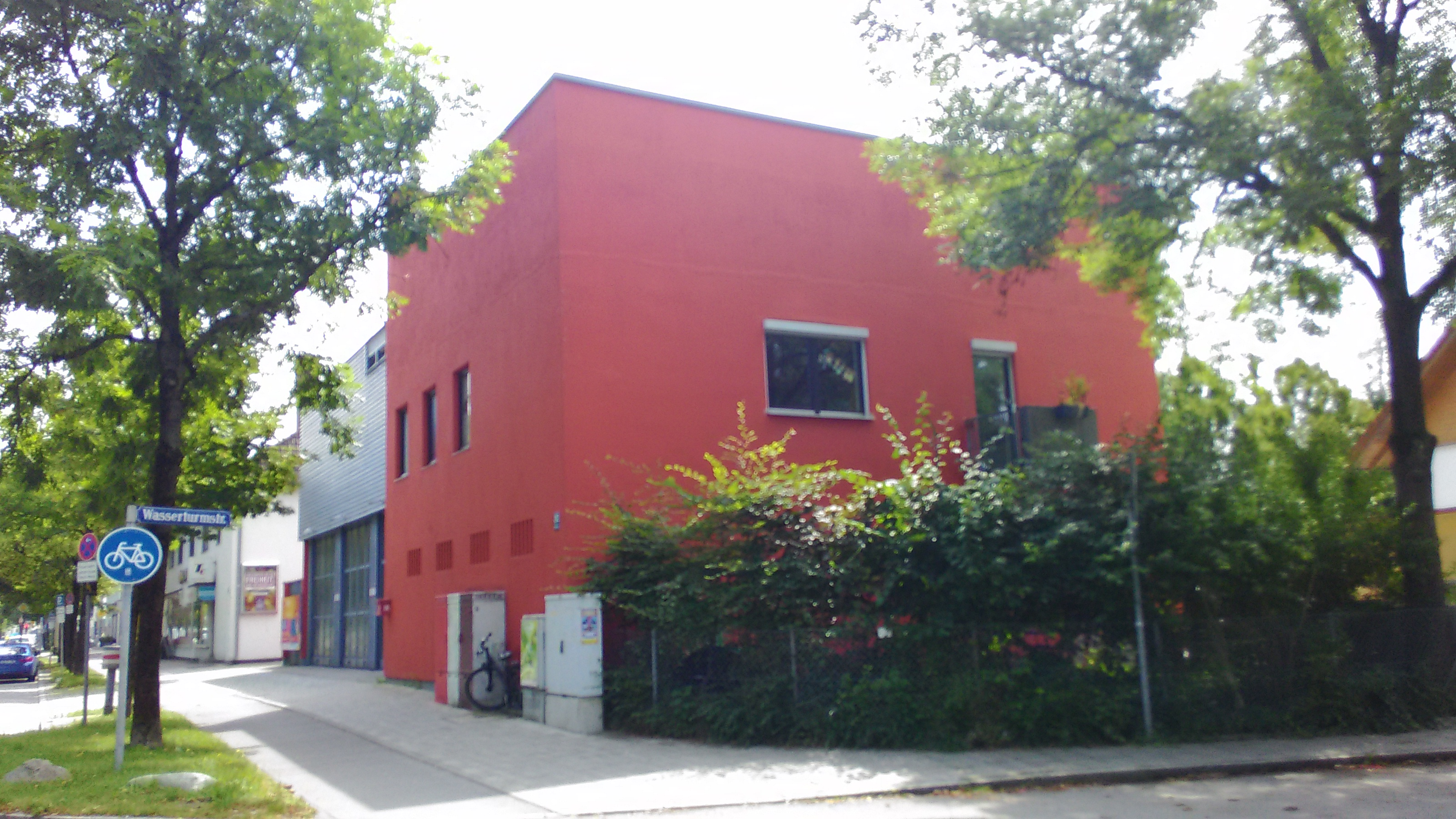
Volunteer Fire Department Munich, Department Waldtrudering

The exact founding date of the firefighting group in Waldtrudering can unfortunately no longer be determined, since all documents were destroyed in the Second World War. However, in 1921 the history of the Trudering fire department mentions the Waldtrudering fire department, which was an important addition for the fire protection in the former municipality Trudering. In 1923, the official founding took place as an independent fire department. The Waldtrudering fire department then owned a hand pump, which had to be pulled by the crew. This was housed in a shed next to the former water tower. In 1930, an old hoses tank trailer with a motor-driven pump was purchased, which was pulled by a truck. Since the shed was too small to house this, it had to be enlarged. On 1 December 1931, the following was noted in the registration form when the Freiwillige Feuerwehr Waldtrudering was admitted to the Bavarian Fire Department Association:

Number of members:

- I. technical group (Steiger): 10 men
- II. Technical group (hoses men): 18 men
- Signalers: 2 men
- Control group: 10 men

Number of devices:

- two-piece ladder with support bars: 1 piece
- Hydrant car: 2 pieces
- small hoses: 1 piece
- Pressure hoses: 300 meters

After incorporation of the town (to Munich) in April 1932, the fire service was renamed the Voluntary Fire Department Munich-Waldtrudering, Halblöschzug 18 (a small size fire engine). After the war, there was no interest in the re-establishment of the fire department, until the proposal was made in 1957. At that time, the alarm was signaled by a siren, which was replaced in the early 1970s by the silent alarm system. Since 1992 the department is alarmed together with the professional fire department.

The department Waldtrudering is currently active with a rescue fire engine 20/16 (WT 40.1), a fire engine 16/12 (WT 40.8), and a MZF (WT 11.1). The department, which currently has 43 active members (including 6 female persons), is located in the area of Fire stations 9 and 10.

=== Area south ===
==== Department Forstenried ====
The Forstenrieder Fire Department consists of 29 active firemen and women (as of 12/2010). The area of operation extends from Boschetsrieder Straße in the north to the Autobahnring (belt highway) in the south and from Drygalski Allee in the east to the city limits in the west. The main tasks in the disengagement area are technical assistance, prevention and fire protection. In the case of major incidents, such as severe weather or major fires, however, the volunteer fire department Forstenried moves out throughout the city.

The fire station is located in the Forstenrieder Allee 177, the fleet consists of a rescue service group vehicle 20/16, a fire engine 16/12 and a tank fire engine 16/25 with traffic safety trailer. The rations truck, which serves to provide for the personnel during long-term operations, consisting of kitchen wagons and food trailers, is stationed at Gmunder Straße in the Civil Protection Center.

==== Department Grosshadern ====
By the delivery contract of a fire-extinguishing sprayer of 29 November 1859, the existence of an organized fire department took place for the first time. The company Kgl. Hoffeuerhaus Dominick Kirchmair handed over an extinguishing sprayer with a double pumping station. It was used by 6 to 8 men and threw a steady stream of water up to 70 feet. The price of the sprayer was agreed with 500 guilders. The old sprayer was apparently built so solid or so little in use that only after 30 years, another extinguisher had to be commissioned. The new device was operated by at least 10 men and costed 1200 marks.

Under the "Most High Protectorate of His Royal Highness the Prince Regent Luitpold of Bavaria", the newly founded fire department in Großhadern at the Bavarian State Fire Brigade Association was registered on 8 September 1892.

Großhadern was incorporated into Munich in 1938 and so the fire department Großhadern became the department Großhadern of the Munich volunteer fire department. Making the department Großhadern, one of the youngest departments of the Munich volunteer fire department.

Today, the department Großhadern is active with a 20/16 rescue fire engine, a fire engine 16/25 and a multi-purpose vehicle (MZF). The active area of the volunteer fire department Großhadern includes the neighborhoods: Hadern, Blumenau and parts of Laim and Pasing. In the disembarkation area is the Großhadern hospital, the Augustinum, various laboratories of the LMU, 5 underground stations, as well as several schools.

The Großhadern department is located in the fire stations 2,3 and 6 and is deployed in major urban areas throughout the entire city of Munich.

==== Department Sendling ====
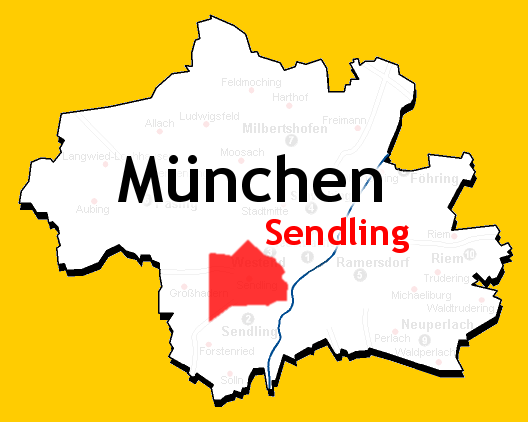
Field of application of the department Sendling

In Sendling, as a result of a severe fire, a Volunteer fire department was founded in 1869. This was incorporated, with the incorporation of Sendlings in 1877, in the Munich fire department and was therefore the first outside Munich-based fire department of Munich. In 1889, it was decided to found another company near the Schlachthof München (slaughterhouse), which, like the company from Thalkirchen, was combined with the fire department in Sendling during the reorganization of the Munich volunteer fire department. The vehicles were housed in the fire station of the Sendlinger fire department, while the comrades in the slaughterhouse district and in Thalkirchen were placed at assembly stations, where they could be picked up by the professional fire department. During the Second World War, this fire station and all the equipment of the fire department were destroyed in a bombing raid.

In 1972, with the comrades of the fire department Großhadern created a fire group Waldfriedhofviertel, which would move out together with Großhadern. This fire group received a fire brigade vehicle in 1974 and was able to move out independently, and through time the group allocated more vehicles. Only in November 1980, this department was again named Sendling, after they had received a new fire station in the Zillertalstraße.

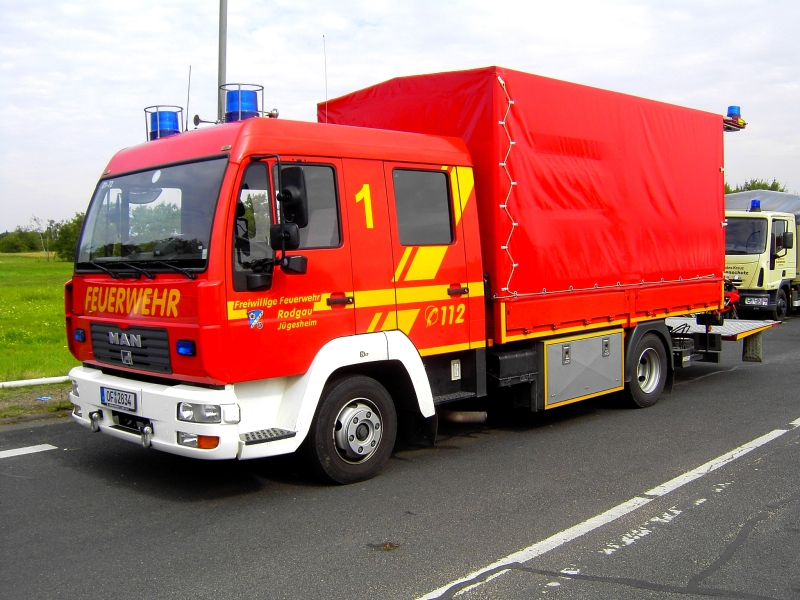
Equipment vehicle

In Sendling are currently two rescue fire engines 20/16, two equipment vehicles, a team transport vehicle and three motorcycles stationed as Despatch riders.

==== Department Solln ====
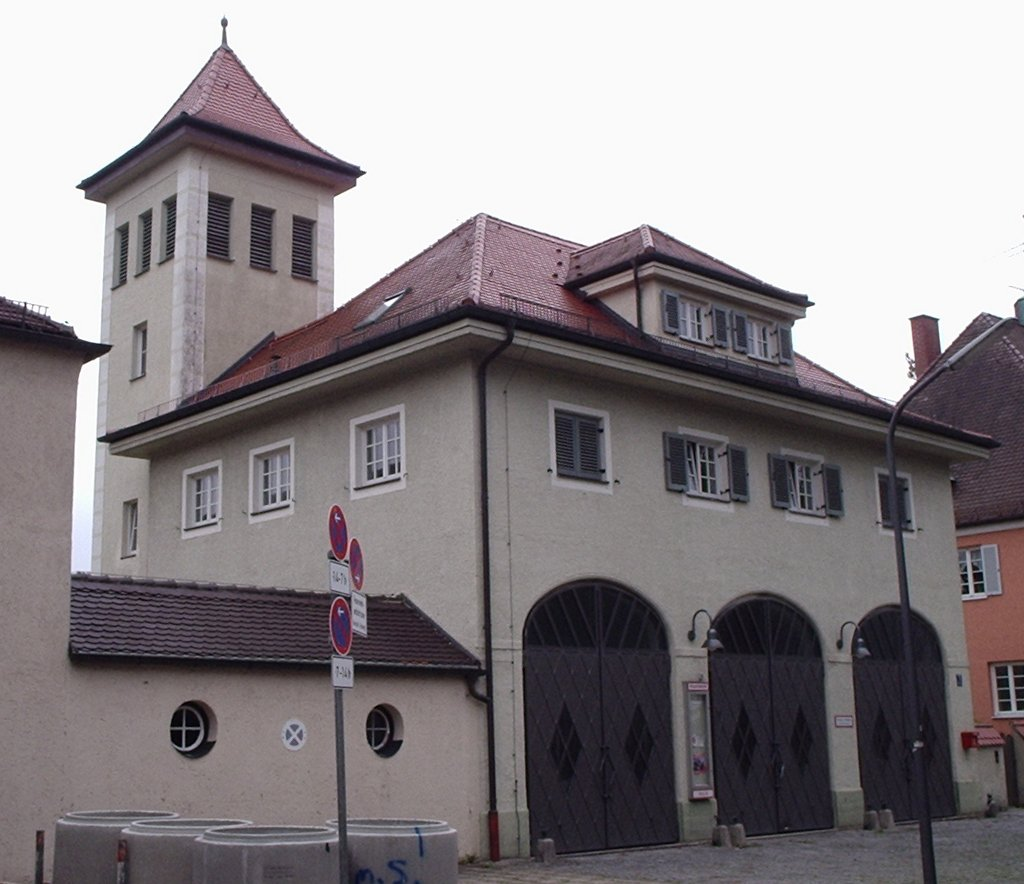
Fire station Solln

The volunteer fire department Solln, founded in 1873, was later integrated into the Munich fire department. Today, the department Solln is active with a rescue fire engine 20/16 and two fire engines 16/12.

=== Area west ===
==== Department Allach ====
The Department Allach exists since 1874 and was founded under the name Volunteer Fire Department Allach. In 1938, the incorporation of Allach into the city of Munich took place and from then, for more than sixty years, the independent volunteer fire department Allach was the Fire squad 27 of the Munich volunteer fire department.

On 1 June 1946, the roadhouse Trinkl was elected as the first fire squadron leader after the war. At this time, 15 active firefighters still belonged to the fire squad Allach. In 1974, the department Allach celebrated its 100th anniversary.

The Allach department currently has an HLF 20/16 rescue fire engine, two LF 16/12 firefighting vehicles and one MZF multi-purpose vehicle. The active team includes over 50 comrades. Making the Allach department one of the strongest personnel departments of the Munich volunteer fire department. The youth fire department of the department offers about 10 young people, aged 12 to 17 years, various leisure activities with a strong reference to fire-related topics. On average, the Allach department handles 150 missions a year, with technical assistance dealing with severe weather damage and fire fighting making up the bulk of the alarms.

==== Department Aubing ====
The first reports of a Löschmaschine (fire apparatus) in Aubing date as far back as 1856. The official founding of the Volunteer fire department Aubing is 1 January 1882. In the course of the incorporation of Aubing to Munich, the fire department was taken over as the fire squad 29 of the Munich volunteer fire department.

Location of the department Aubing is the fire station at Ubostraße 11. Their active area includes Aubing, Aubing East, West Cross, Neuaubing and Freiham. In addition, there is the Moosschwaige, the Aubinger Lohe and Bundesautobahn 99 with the Aubinger Tunnel.

The fleet currently includes a multi-purpose vehicle (fire department), a rescue fire engine 20/16, a fire engine 20 for civil protection and a fire engine 16/12. In addition, the "Association of Friends of the Volunteer Fire Department Aubing" possesses horse-drawn fire engines. This is traditionally used at the Wiesn opening, in historical uniforms. From the association were also AED and thermal imaging cameras procured. This means that the HLF can be used as a First Responder vehicle, as is the case with almost all departments of the FF München (prerequisite: personnel with training as paramedics are on the vehicle).

The youth group of the department is integrated into the area West.

==== Department Moosach ====
The Moosach department of the Munich volunteer fire department can now look back on more than 125 years of history. Since the middle of the 19th century, there was a mandatory municipal fire department in the former village of Moosach near Munich. This was replaced by the founding of the volunteer fire department in Moosach on 8 April 1879, Paul Berthold sen. was the first commander. As part of the incorporation of the village Moosach to Munich in 1913, the volunteer fire department Moosach was incorporated into the municipal fire department of the city of Munich as Division 8. Out of 14 active members drafted in the First World War, only four returned at the end of the war. On 25 December 1925, the department was the first Munich volunteer fire department to receive a motorized sprayer with a three-stage Magirus high-pressure centrifugal pump and a capacity of 800 to 1000 liters / minute.

On 21 April 1931, the Moosach department put the first automobile vehicle into active service at the Munich volunteer fire department. In 1933, the Moosach department was divided up and integrated into the general fire protection police. In the spring of 1945, the re-establishment of the Department 8 of the Munich volunteer fire department took place under commander Josef Heinrich. In 1954, the 75th anniversary of its founding was celebrated with a flag-consecration. In 1972, the so-called silent alerts were replaced by radio alarm receiver at the Moosach department, the first department of the Munich volunteer fire department to do so and it was introduced on the occasion of the Olympics. On 19 March 1979, the present fire station was handed over to the department Moosach. The old fire station was demolished in 1980. From 4 to 6 May 1979, the 100th anniversary of its founding was celebrated. In 1982, the Moosach department founded the first youth group of the Munich fire department, which celebrated its 25th anniversary in 2007. In 1993, Munich's first female fire fighter started her service in the Moosach department and successfully completed her basic training. On 2 May 2004, the Moosach department celebrated its 125th anniversary.

The Moosach department currently has a 20/16 rescue fire engine, a 16/12 fire engine and a multi-purpose vehicle.

==== Department Obermenzing ====
The department Obermenzing currently has a fire engine 16/12 and a rescue fire engine 20/16 and a crew transport vehicle.

==== Department Langwied-Lochhausen ====
The founding of the volunteer fire department Langwied-Lochhausen took place in 1878, during the tenure of Simon Heitmeier as mayor or Lochhausen . The first commander of the Langwied-Lochhausen fire department was Martin Naßl, who was elected at the constituent meeting on 5 March 1878. After the incorporation of Langwied-Lochhausen as the 40th municipality of the City of Munich on 1 April 1942, the formerly independent fire department of the village as fire brigade 30 was incorporated into the Munich volunteer fire department.

Today the department Langwied-Lochhausen consists of about 30 active fire service providers (including the youth fire brigade), which can rely on a high-quality fleet and equipment pool.

- HLF type "Munich": In the middle of 2011, the department was one of the last to receive the standard vehicle of the Munich fire department Munich as first responders. Amenities include an additional AED and advanced medical equipment.
- LF 16/12: Standard vehicle of the FF Munich which is additionally equipped with thermal imaging cameras, AED, and pulse oximeter.
- TLF 16/25: Additionally loaded with an E-sucker and optionally with a fast-action boat and associated equipment for water and ice rescue. In addition, it is used as a towing vehicle for the VSA (traffic safety trailer) of the department, which is responsible for the area A8 / A99.
- MZF: The MB Sprinter, which was taken over from the US Army, was converted into a fire engine by the comrades themselves. It serves beyond response support to the youth fire brigade as well as the association work.

In addition to the mentioned vehicles, a multi-purpose trailer is available, which can be used for a wide variety of transports.

==== Department Ludwigsfeld ====
The department Ludwigsfeld is located in the area west. Currently, Ludwigsfeld has a 16/12 fire engine and a 20/16 rescue fire engine, as well as a utility truck, which is also used as a driving school vehicle to train new drivers within the Volunteer fire department.

=== Youth fire department ===
Munich Youth Fire Brigade was founded in 1982 in the Moosach department of the Munich Volunteer fire department and celebrated its 25th anniversary in 2007. The youth group is now an integral part of the Munich volunteer fire department. It is divided into five groups, in which around 250 boys and girls, between the ages of 12 and 18, actively deal with issues pertaining to firefighting. The members of the youth fire brigade are trained in fire-fighting technology and first aid, additionally there is an extensive leisure program.

== Training ==
The professional fire department contenders are trained in correspondence with the current national German regulations for example the transnational agreements, including those of the Institut der Feuerwehr Nordrhein-Westfalen (Institute of the Fire department North Rhine-Westphalia), depending on the qualification level (two to four). At the fire department school on FW2, training is mainly provided in the courses BI (basic course) and BIII (group leader course or equivalent courses after the administrative reform). The fire engine driver training courses (BIV) take place at the Feuerwehrschule Geretsried (SFSG).

The training of the volunteer fire department is carried out by the Training and Education Center (TAZ) in cooperation with the professional fire department. Except for special subjects, all courses up to and including the qualification level Group Leader (FIII) are offered in Munich. The basic training of FF München extends over a period of 3 years and lasts a total of 350 hours in a variety of different courses (see FwDV2 233 hours). It is completed with the qualification to Squadron Leader (FII) and the promotion to leading fireman / woman.

== Emergency medical service ==
The emergency medical service in the city and in the districts of Munich was founded in 1966 by the professional fire department and is still in operation today ("Rettungsdienstzweckverband München"). Since then, nine hospitals provide a physician specializing in internal medicine, surgery or anesthesia for service on the three ambulance and eight emergency doctor vehicles. The Munich emergency doctors are called out about 80 times a day.

=== Emergency doctor location ===
The vehicles for the emergency medical service are stationed in the Surgical Clinic of LMU Munich city center (Florian Munich middle 70/1), in the hospital Großhadern (Florian Munich Großhadern 76/1), in the surgical hospital Munich south (Florian Munich Thalkirchen 76 / 1) in Thalkirchen, in Klinikum Schwabing (Florian München Schwabing 70/1), on Feuerwache 10 (Florian München Riem 76/1), in Klinikum München Pasing (Florian München Pasing 76/1), in the Klinikum Dritter Orden (Florian München Nymphenburg 70/1), the Helmholtz Zentrum München (Florian Neuherberg 76/1), the town hospital Bogenhausen (Florian München Bogenhausen 76/1), the fire station 9 (Florian München Neuperlach 76/1) and the fire station of the volunteer fire department Ottobrunn (Florian Ottobrunn 76/1). In addition, an ambulance is stationed on the rescue helicopter Christoph 1 (location Klinikum Harlaching). The ITH Christoph München, which is mainly used for transfers, is also available 24 hours a day for emergencies at the Klinikum Großhadern, which is staffed by two pilots, an emergency doctor and an air rescue assistant with intensive nursing additional training.

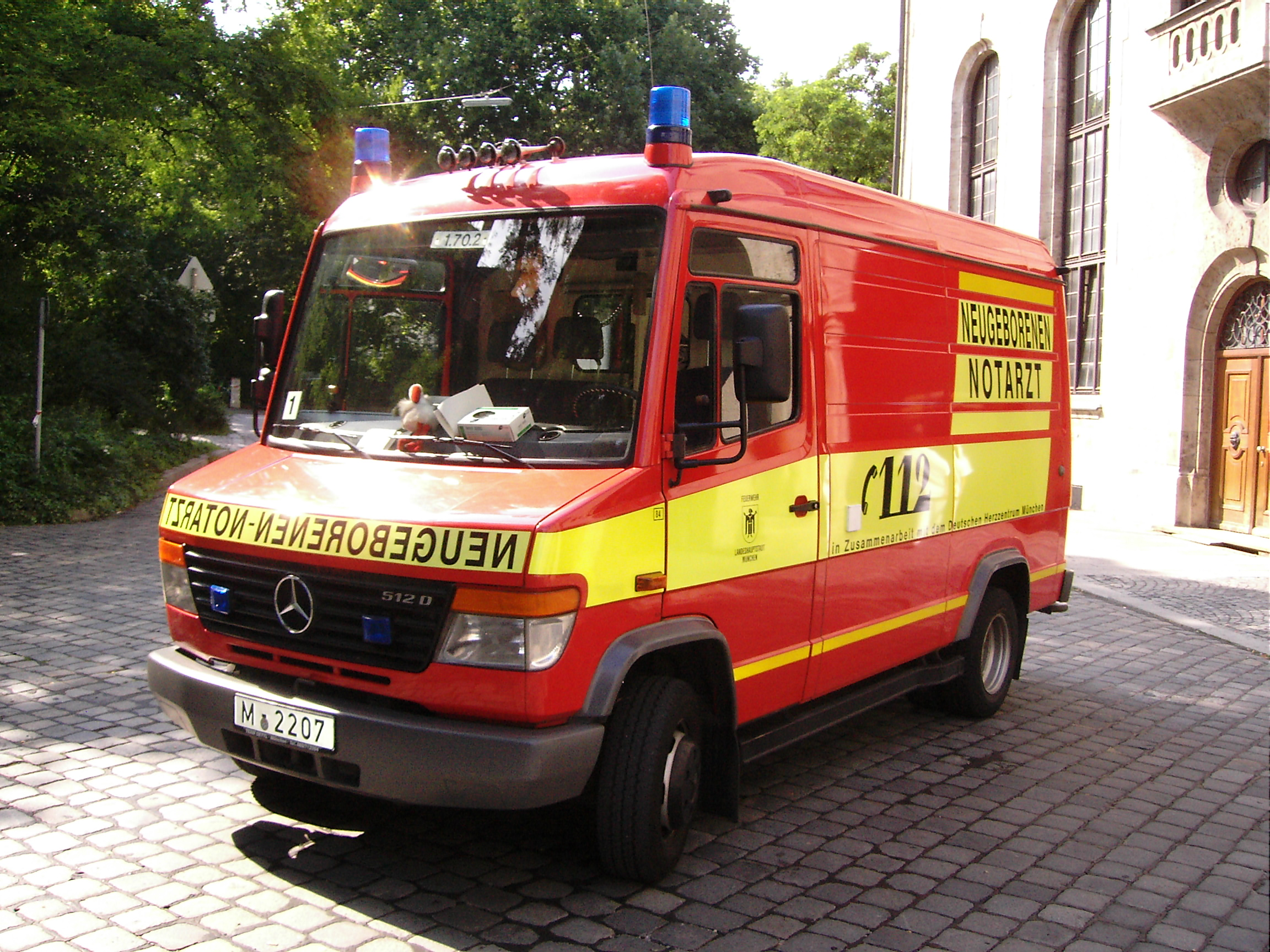
Newborn emergency doctor with incubator

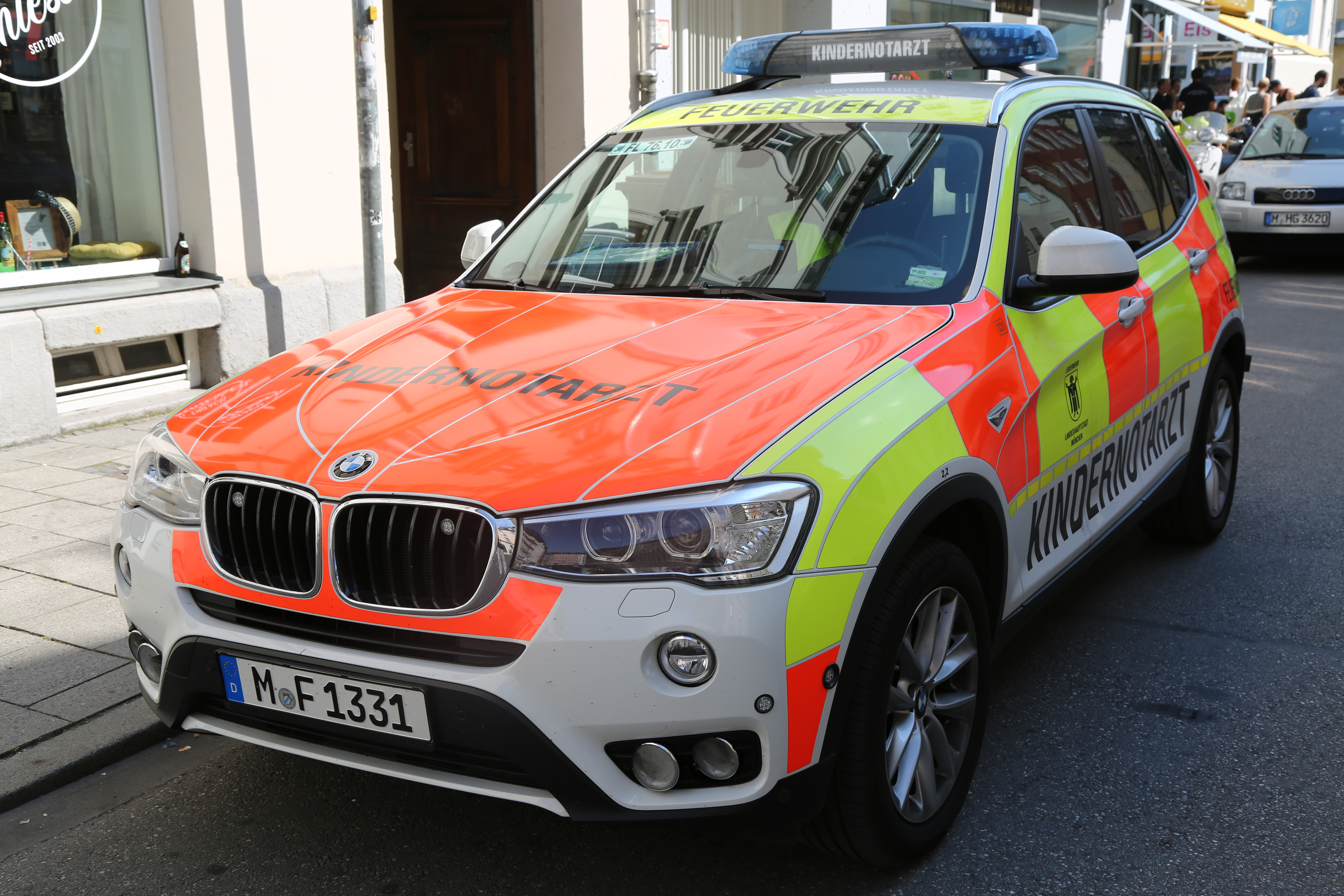
Children emergency medical vehicle, 2019

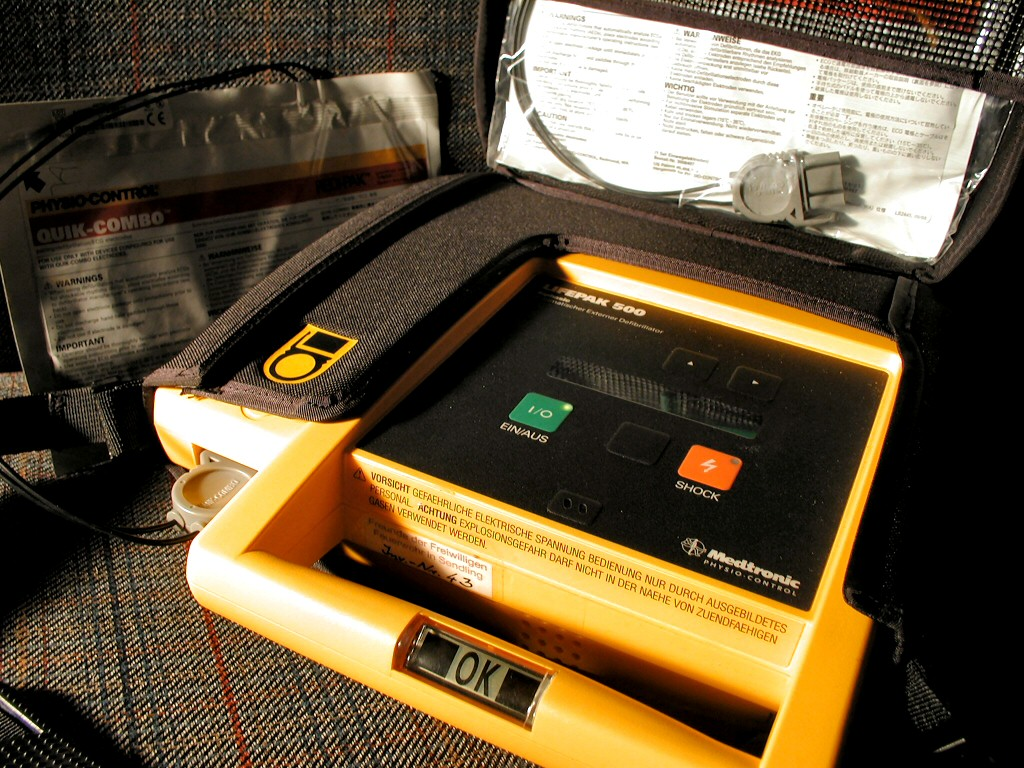
One defibrillator (AED) is on each rescue fire engine of the Munich fire department.

=== NEF or NAW ===
Most German cities have switched to a rendezvous system; meaning the emergency doctor is brought to the place of deployment with a car, the emergency medical vehicle (NEF).

Despite the results of a study commissioned by the Bavarian Ministry of the Interior (TRUST = Trend and Structure Analysis of the Rescue Service in Bavaria) and the corresponding recommendation of the Institute for Emergency Medicine of LMU Munich, to change all Bavarian NAW into NEF, they continue to use the emergency ambulance (NAW) in addition to the emergency medical vehicle (NEF) in Munich.

Since it is assumed that the NAW is critical to the rendezvous system in the densely populated neighborhoods, a NAW is still stationed at the Chirurgischen Klinik Innenstadt (Surgical Clinic), the Dritter Orden Hospital and the Schwabing Hospital. However, if the emergency doctor has significantly longer travel times, an ambulance or a first-responder vehicle of a fire station (Munich HLF) or a relief organization such as the Bayerisches Rotes Kreuz (Bavarian Red Cross) or Malteser Hilfsdienst (Malteser emergency service), is sent ahead.

=== Special Emergency Physicians ===
In addition to these normal emergency physicians, Munich also has a pediatric emergency doctor, who is additionally alerted by the Integrated Control Center in case of emergencies involving children under the age of 12. The doctor rotates weekly with one of the four children's hospitals in Munich. The vehicle Florian München 76/10 has its base at the main fire station, but is stationed at the hospital on duty. In addition, there is also a neonatal emergency doctor from the ranks of the children's specialists of the cardiological intensive care unit of the German Heart Center. Which is particularly alarmed in problem births - i.e., sudden birth at home or problematic births in clinics that have no neonatal intensive care unit. The neonatal emergency doctor and an intensive care worker are then picked up by the ambulance Florian München 70/30, who has a mobile incubator on board. Therefore, a newborn child can be supplied with intensive care until it is brought to a suitable children's intensive care unit.

In addition, there is a toxicological emergency medical service in Munich, which can help in the case of poisoning emergencies on the spot with the two large rescue vehicles.

=== Involvement of the fire department in the rescue service ===
In Munich, the professional fire department takes over the emergency medical service, while ambulances are occupied by aid organizations and private rescue services. In addition, the ELRD (organizational leader ambulance service) is alternately provided by the BF (fire service) and the aid organizations. These include, in addition to the Bayerisches Rotes Kreuz (Bavarian Red Cross), the Johanniter-Unfall-Hilfe, the Malteser Hilfsdienst (Malteser emergency service) and the "Arbeiter-Samariter-Bund" (workers good Samaritan association). The private emergency services, which have been involved in emergency rescue since 1998, are mainly represented by the two companies MKT and Aicher Ambulanz-Union - they provide 6 or 8 RTW, and which meanwhile also provide ELRD units. In addition, the company IMS occupies an ambulance. Some of the rescue vehicles of the relief organizations and private rescue services are also stationed at the fire stations of the professional fire department.

At the fire stations, ambulances of the professional fire department are also stationed, which disengage with the fire engine each time. In the normal rescue service, they are not actually involved, since they serve for self-protection or to assist the staff on the fire engine. The crew has, in contrast to the other ambulance crews, a medical and firefighting training. If no ambulance of the regular rescue service is available, they are alerted to peak coverage. The same applies to the ambulances of the works fire service BMW, Krauss-Maffei, MTU / MAN and the Technical University of Munich in Garching.

== Specialties ==
=== Height Rescue ===
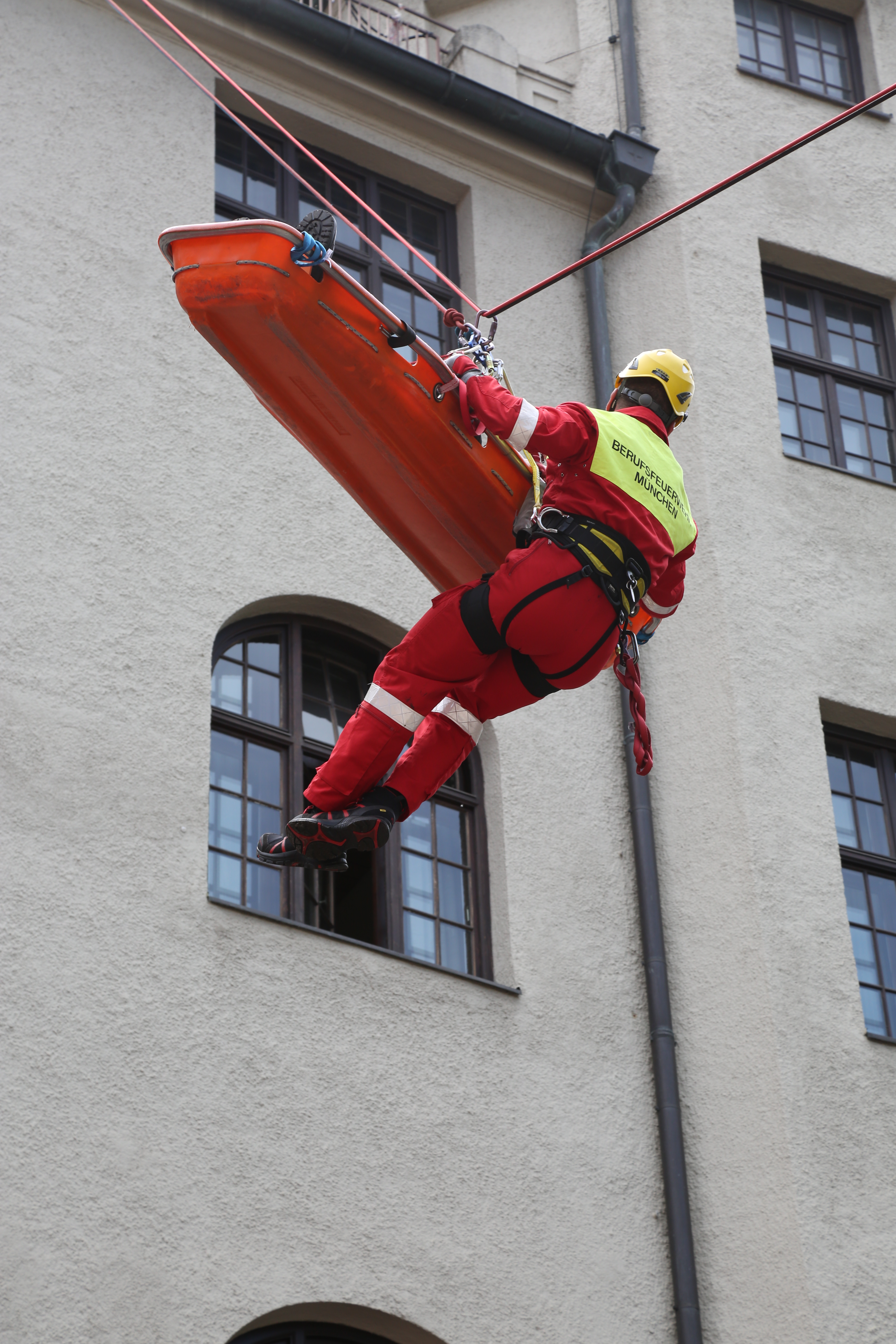
Demonstration of the height rescue group 2017

Since May 1996 the Munich professional fire department maintains a height rescue group at the fire station in Föhring, from which five personnel are constantly on duty. They are part of the normal fire service and attend to conventional firefighting operations. About 110 times a year, however, they must also be alerted, since conventional life-saving equipment such as turntables, fall protection or the like is no longer sufficient. They also working closely with several air rescue services, which also help with rescue helicopters if necessary.

A Germany-wide cooperation exists between the hospital Bogenhausen and the height rescuers, since about 50 emergency physicians of this hospital were trained in height rescue. It is also possible to provide patients in exposed locations with emergency medical care and then to rescue them through technical measures.

=== Water rescue / ice rescue ===
Due to civil service regulations, all professional firefighters in Germany have completed training as a lifeguard (at the minimum the German rescue swimming badge in bronze). In addition, located at the fire stations 5 and 6, are a group of divers who disengage with their water rescue equipment vehicle in addition to the appropriate guards. Also, at the fire station 6, the training for fire fighter divers and fire service diving instructor takes place.

In order to save time, two divers of the fire station 5 are picked up by a rescue helicopter and flown directly to the place of the incident. In order to be able to provide effective assistance even before the arrival of the divers group, all other fire stations and fire station houses are also equipped with water rescue equipment. Also, for ice rescue, the corresponding units move out regularly.

=== Pressure chamber ===
In order to be able to treat diver accidents, there is also a stationary pressure chamber (center for hyperbaric medicine) at the fire station 5, which is also suitable for the treatment of smoke poisoning and other intoxications. The pressure chamber is one of the few in Germany, which is on 24 hours standby and the appropriate medical professionals, for example diving physician, is available immediately. As a result, and through the corresponding technical equipment, intensive care of the patient is possible in the pressure chamber.

=== Analytical Task Force (ATF) ===
Since 2010 in Munich, there is also a joint Analytical Task Force made up from the volunteer and professional fire departments.

=== Air Operations Unit ===
The air operations unit has been in operation since 2008, and carries out forest firefighting from the air and transports equipment and personnel to hardly accessible areas in cooperation with helicopters of other organizations such as military, federal and state police. The Air Operations Unit also sets up and operates outdoor landing sites (weather forecasting, flight information / guidance). For forest fire fighting, the unit has two 900 L and two 5000 L containers (see Dept. Waldperlach), as well as various additional material (e.g. 7000 L folding containers, forest fire fighting equipment).

=== Integrated dispatch and control center ===
Munich operates the Bavaria wide oldest integrated dispatch and control center, which coordinates approximately 1,400 daily operations of the fire department, rescue service, THW and civil protection in Munich (emergency services of the districts also) and dispatches 540 vehicles. For this purpose, the dispatchers can fall back on a firefighting and rescue service training, as well as several years of operational experience.

The Integrated Dispatch and Control Center includes management rooms to enable the Civil Protection Operations Staff to coordinate large-scale operations. It also serves nationwide as a counseling center in dealing with hazardous substances and provides further help, if necessary, such as TUIS, ATF. It is also responsible throughout Bavaria for the coordination of intensive care transport helicopters, as well as the distribution and availability of beds for severely burned casualties.

The control center receives an emergency call on average every 30 seconds. In order to cope with the number of calls, the Integrated Control Center has 24 ISDN channels for the European emergency call 112 and 16 ISDN channels for the number 19222. These can be queried from 21 places at the same time, whereby in large operations and storms eight additional telephone workstations can be switched on. As a backup, since October 2005, an "emergency ILST" was implemented and is housed in the FW 1. In order to enable the deaf to request help, it is also possible to send an emergency fax. The processing of the mission data is therefore done with computer assistance.

Over nine radio channels of the 4-meter band and 16 2-meter bands, as well as digital radio, not only units can be alerted but they can also communicate with them, a radio network in the subway and S-Bahn also exists, as well as in special buildings (e.g. high-rise buildings so-called building Wireless) therefore a connection with the emergency services is also possible.

In 2017, the Integrated Control Center moved from its previous location, the FW3, to the newly built FW4 in Schwabing.

== Disaster control ==
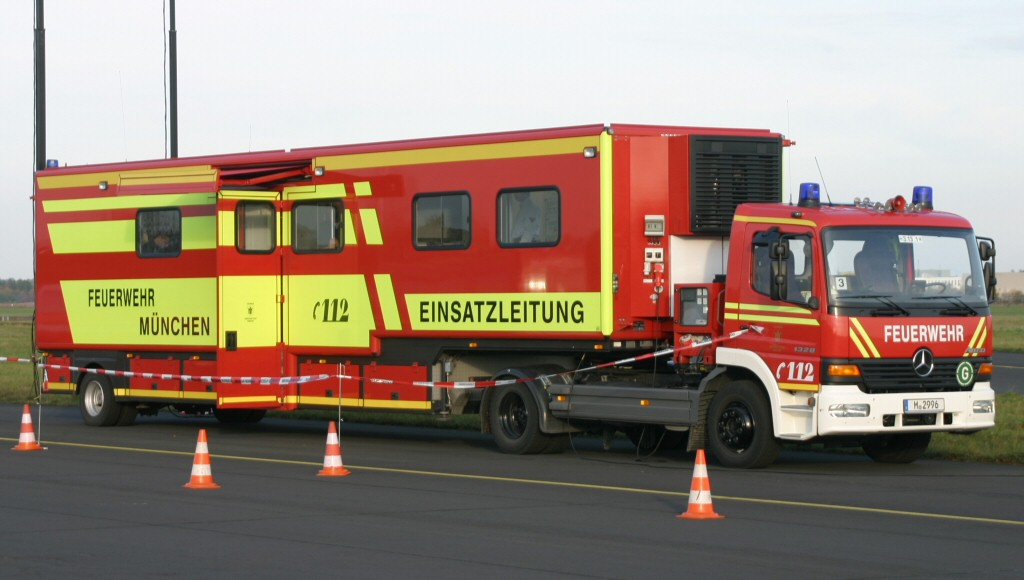
Disaster Management Center of the Munich Fire Department (ELW 3)

The Munich disaster control is made up from the professional fire department, the volunteer fire department, the worker Arbeiter-Samariter-Bund Deutschland (Samariter federation), the Bayerisches Rotes Kreuz (Bavarian red cross), the Johanniter-Unfall-Hilfe, the Malteser Hilfsdienst e.V. (Malteser relief service), the DLRG (German life rescue society), the Technisches Hilfswerk (Federal institute for technical assistance organization) and the air rescue services. Volunteer members from these organizations that are involved in disaster protection were exempted from military service.

Effective action by these units is particularly dependent on a well-organized governance structure. Therefore, damage areas are divided into operational sections, which are led and coordinated by the local operations manager. In the event of a mass-casualty incident, additional assistance from a senior emergency physician and the organizational director (so-called sanitary mission management SanEL) is provided. The Integrated Control Center is responsible for passing on information and instructions to the individual operational units.

The central vehicle hall for the Munich disaster control is the Zeppelinhalle in the district Sendling. Also located there are large-scale warehouses for aid organizations.

== Civil Protection ==
The civil protection targets particularly at civilian protection in the case of required defense. The organization works parallel to the disaster control. In addition, however, the Munich Fire Department is also particularly active in the area of provisioning. For this purpose, it maintains thirty protection facilities, which also include large protection rooms, basic shelters and bunkers. In addition, the fire department school in Munich regularly offers instruction seminars for companies and citizens.

A special area of activity for the civilian protection is the drinking water supply. This is guaranteed by a system of shallow and deep wells throughout the city, whose connections are camouflaged for safety reasons.

== Municipal Fire Department Association Munich ==
The Municipal Fire Department Association München e.V., founded on 20 September 1993, unites all Munich fire departments into an interest group. The board consists of the head of the professional fire department (1st chairman), the acting commander of the volunteer fire department (1st vice chairman) and another person to be elected (2nd vice chairman).

If necessary, the individual members of the Municipal Fire Department Association can support one another in missions and carry out joint exercises. The Municipal Fire Department Association organizes a symposium every year, during which experts talk about current topics related to fire protection and technical assistance.

== See also ==
"Die Geschichte der Münchner Berufsfeuerwehr" (The history of the Munich fire department) on muenchen.de
