= Junior firefighter =

Youth activity organized by fire departments

Junior firefighting is a youth activity mostly organized by fire departments. It serves as a means of personal development for youth, as well as a recruiting pool for fire departments.

Junior firefighter programs give young people the chance to learn about local fire, rescue, and emergency medical services response organizations in a safe, controlled, and educational way, while providing departments with a recruitment mechanism. Reaching out to people when they are young can have long-range effects, and encouraging youth to take part in the emergency services may be beneficial to local communities and departments. Benefits of junior firefighter programs include:

- Allowing youth to gain insight and interest in becoming long-term members of the emergency services
- Increasing awareness among youth about volunteering and supporting the fire and emergency services
- Providing departments with additional help in accomplishing non-firefighting or non-emergency tasks
- Leadership development for America's youth, who are tomorrow's leaders
- Educating parents and mentors on the importance of encouraging volunteerism

Training activities allow the teenagers to gain firefighting and emergency service experience. Typical activities practicing firefighting techniques, communication using radios, practicing first aid, maintaining firefighting gear, firefighting drills, and responding to emergency calls.

== National groups ==
In Australia, state based volunteer bush firefighting organizations run cadet programs.

In the Austrian fire departments the Feuerwehrjugend acts as a reservoir for young members as voluntary firefighters. Boys and girls can begin from an age of 8 or 10 years (depending on federal state) and change with 15 years in the active service.

In Chile, the cadet brigades is for the youth from 12 to 18 years (depending on the company's general regulations), they are taught discipline, how to use firefighter items, history of firefighters, first aid, traditions, etc. When they are 18 years old they pass to volunteer firemen without any type of process depending on the department, they get their own uniform and are generally led by a lieutenant instructor, and the rest of the instruction team, and formed by Cadets. Most companies in Chile have their own cadet brigade.

In the Netherlands, the Jeugdbrandweer is for the youth from 12 to 18 years. Because of insurance problems, members are not allowed to stay a junior firefighter after their 18th birthday. They are, however, not allowed to become actual firefighters before they are 21 years old. Because officially the Dutch Junior Fire Department is a recruitment program, this has been criticized. Though many fire stations individually organise an agreement so that junior firemen can stay (for example, as an instructor) between their 18th and 21st birthday. Dutch Junior Fire Departments play matches and tournaments against other junior firefighter sections from other fire stations throughout the entire country. It's a tradition to camp with the junior firefighter sections in the summer. This happens with other junior firefighter sections, and sometimes even with junior firefighter sections from different countries.

Belgium has also a Jeugdbrandweer that is similar to the Jeugdbrandweer from the Netherlands

In Germany, the German Youth Fire Brigade is for youths from 10 to 18 years. In most German states, they are not allowed to take part in real emergencies until their 16th or 18th birthday, when they may join the regular fire department. Junior firefighters in Germany and Austria are part of the regular fire departments, but they form a distinct group within their department.

The French fire service also features a youth program.

In the United Kingdom, it is organized through the YFA - Young Firefighter Association.

In the United States, the Fire Service Exploring is a program offered by Learning for Life, a branch of the Boy Scouts of America. The National Volunteer Fire Council offers the National Junior Firefighter Program, a national umbrella program for all youth firefighting programs, including Explorers, cadets, and junior firefighters.

In Finland, the different volunteer fire departments can choose to start up a youth unit for 10 to 18-year-olds and some even have younger doing what is called "varhaisnuoret" they are usually few years younger. The stations do training of the basic skills once a week or once every two weeks. They also host camps for the youth with international counterparts in Germany. Once a youth firefighter is 18 he will move up to be a volunteer.

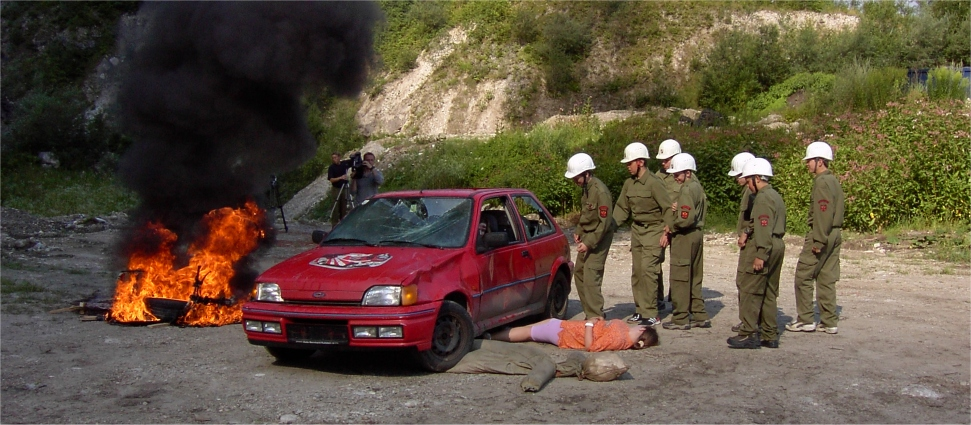
Junior firefighters in Austria during a live exercise

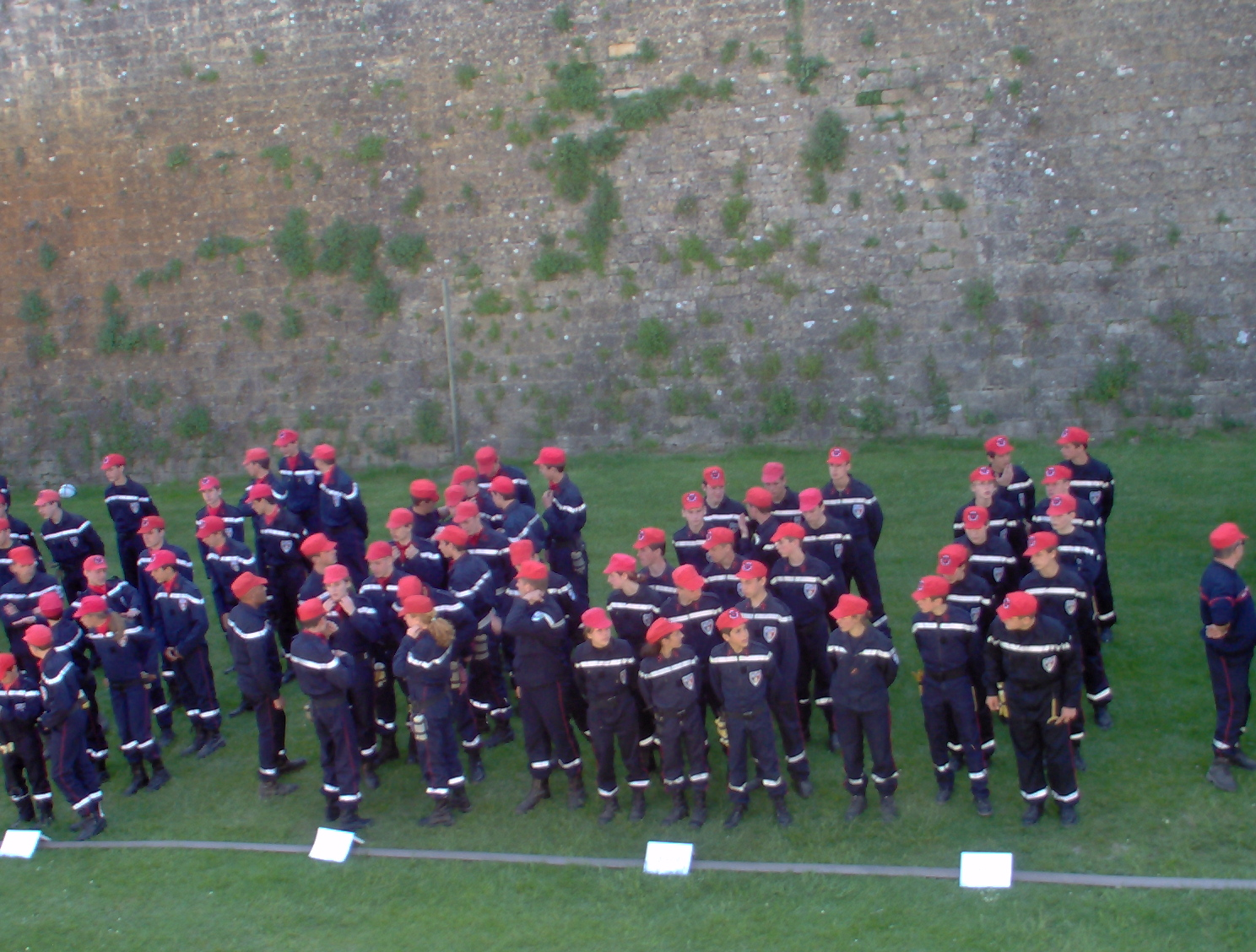
French junior firefighters in 2003

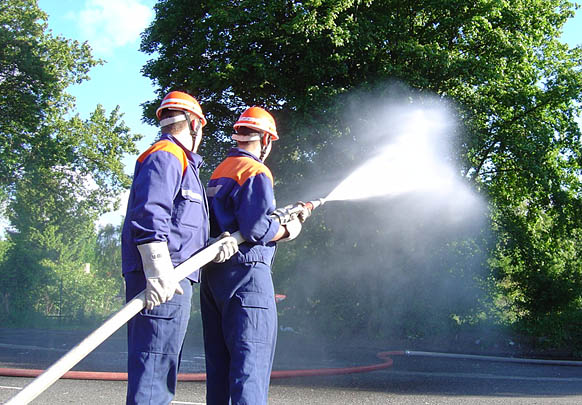
German junior firefighters
