= Jeugdbrandweer =

Jeugdbrandweer (Youth Fire Brigade)
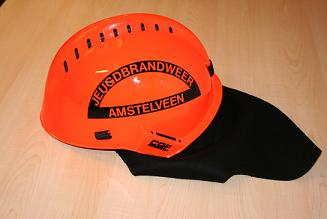
- Jeugdbrandweer Helmet
- Active: 31 October 1964 -
- Country: Netherlands and Belgium (Flanders Region)
- Type: Volunteer Youth Organisation
- Size: ~150 Groups

Jeugdbrandweer is a Youth organisation active in the Netherlands and the Flanders region of Belgium across more than 150 fire departments. Young people aged 12 to 18 are acquainted with the work of firefighters. The youngsters are taught the basic skills of firefighting and practice with specialist equipment and materials of the fire service. After the young person becomes is 18, it is possible under certain conditions to join the fire service as a professional firefighter. The Jeugdbrandweer is seen as a good training and recruitment tool for new staff.

A Jeugdbrandweer is usually divided into two groups, Juniors (junioren) those under 15 years of age, and Aspirants (aspiranten) those under 18 years of age. Knowledge and skills of the groups are tested through competitions and formal tests.

== Netherlands ==
=== Organization ===
In the Netherlands Jeugdbrandweer fall under one organisation, the Stichting Jeugdbrandweer Nederland (Foundation Jeugdbrandweer Netherlands) (abbreviated JBNL). This organisation organises youth fire competitions and displays and guided training materials.

=== Competitions ===
Jeugdbrandweer Netherlands organises a variety of competitions every year throughout the Netherlands for all youth fire brigades. During these competitions, the youth firefighters will be challenged to put out controlled fires. They are judged during the competition by experienced firefighters and participate in an end of the day review. There are several rounds of competitions, namely qualifiers, semifinals and national finals.

For junior groups there is only the category of competition, the low pressure category. The aspirant groups can choose between low pressure and high pressure categories. At the low pressure category participants must extinguish a fire using a fire hydrant by means of the deposition system. At the high pressure category the group must extinguish a fire with water directly from the fire truck.

== See also ==
- German Youth Fire Brigade
- Junior firefighter
