= German Youth Fire Brigade =

Youth Fire Brigade

German Youth Fire Brigade (Deutsche Jugendfeuerwehr)
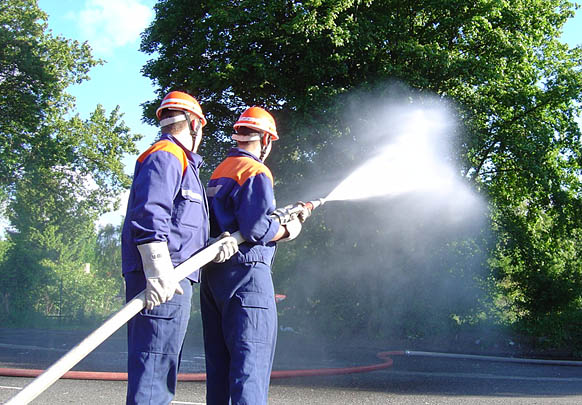
- Firefighting training carried out by youth firefighters
- Active: 31 October 1964-
- Country: Germany
- Type: Volunteer Youth Organisation
- Size: ~17,600 Groups; ~240,000 Youth Firefighters

The German Youth Fire Brigade ( DJF ) is in place to promote an interest in German fire brigades and train young people in preparation for joining. Depending on the German state, the exact name of the programme varies.

== History ==
=== Foundation ===
The first youth fire brigade in Germany was established in 1882 in Oevenum on the island of Föhr, making it probably the oldest in Europe. Due to many of the men working mostly at sea, the fire safety of the island was made the responsibility of the youth fire brigade. The first youth fire brigade in accordance with the modern model is the youth fire brigade based at Niebüll, founded in 1953. During the Third Reich youth fire brigades were reorganized during the course of the Gleichschaltung as Hitler Youth fire brigades. The German Youth Fire Brigade (DJF) was founded in 1964 in Berlin.

By the "Youth Law of the GDR" on 4 May 1964 working groups named "Young Fire Protection Helpers" were created in the GDR. Children in these groups were taught outside of school about the basics of fire safety, preventative fire protection, firefighting, and first aid. The working groups were generally headed by members of the volunteer fire brigade. After German reunification, the working groups were reorganized as "youth fire brigades".

== Education ==
Youth Fire Brigades usually meet weekly for training. The training includes basic activities that are carried out by the fire service as well as training to improve dexterity, agility, and overall fitness, as well as improving the general knowledge of members. Youth firefighters are trained by experienced firefighters. Most of them are in leading ranks. Activities outside of the fire brigade are undertaken in many youth fire brigades. For example, camping, visits to cinemas, and sports such as soccer can be carried out. These help to promote a sense of camaraderie within the youth fire brigade.

== Uniform ==
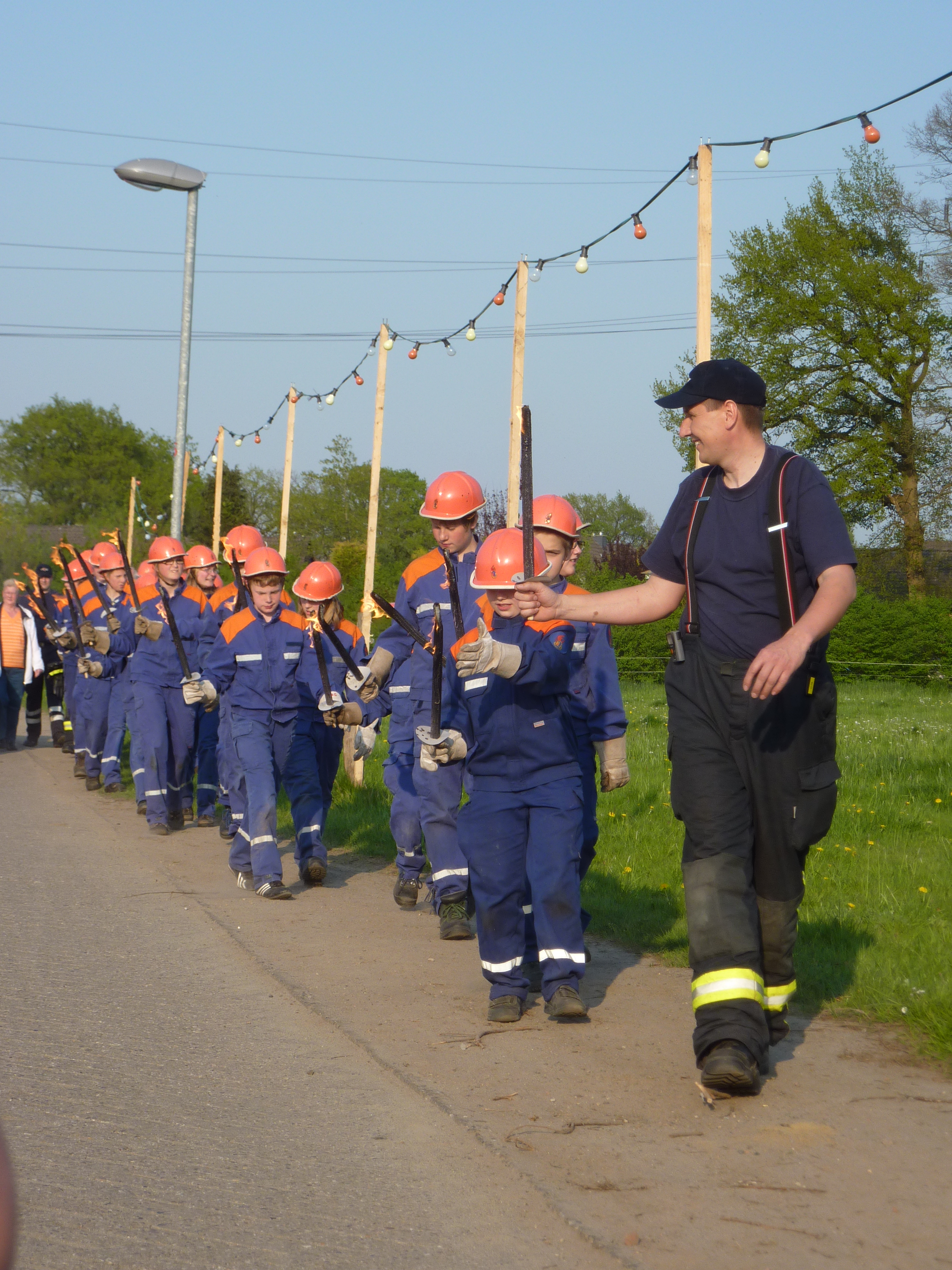
Bad Zwischenahn Jugendfeuerwehr

The uniform of the youth fire brigade in Germany consists of appropriate footwear, youth fire brigade branded trousers, youth fire brigade branded shirts, a helmet, and cut resistant plastic gloves. Many youth fire brigades provide additional weather-proof youth fire brigade branded raincoats, and safety shoes/safety boots at their own expense. The jackets are blue with orange on the shoulders, and a reflective strip across the back. The trousers are blue with reflective stripes.

== See also ==
- Jeugdbrandweer
- Junior firefighter
