= Knights Hospitaller =

Catholic military order

Order of Knights of the Hospital of Saint John of Jerusalem
- Ordo Fratrum Hospitalis Sancti Ioannis Hierosolymitani
- Coat of arms and the eight-pointed cross used by Hospitallers during the Crusades
- Active: 15 February 1113–6 July 1799 (686 years, 141 days) (Note: The order lost all territorial influence with the French invasion of Malta in 1798 and the abdication of its last Grand Master in 1799. In the aftermath, several Protestant orders were split off, with the remaining Catholic order being re-established, as the Sovereign Military Order of Malta, in 1822.)
- Allegiance: The Pope
- Type: Catholic military order
- Headquarters: Jerusalem; Acre; Rhodes; Birgu; Valletta
- Nickname: The "Religion"
- Patron: Our Lady of Philermos; John the Baptist
- Colors: Black and white; Red and white
- Engagements: List: The Crusades; Siege of Damascus (1148); Siege of Ascalon (1153); Crusader invasions of Egypt (1163–9); Battle of Cresson (1187); Battle of Hattin (1187); Siege of Jerusalem (1187); Siege of Belvoir Castle (1187-9); Siege of Sahyun Castle (1188); Siege of Safed (1188); Siege of Acre (1189–1191); Battle of Arsuf (1191); Battle of Las Navas de Tolosa (1212); Siege of Alcácer do Sal (1217); Siege of Mount Tabor (1217); Battle of Fariskur (1219); Battle of Mansurah (1221); Conquest of Majorca (1228); Battle of Hama (1230); Siege of Burriana (1233); Siege of Ascalon (1247); Battle of Jaffa (1256); Fall of Arsuf (1265); Battle of the Orontes (1265); Siege of Safed (1266); Battle of Al-Ruways (1266); Fall of Krak des Chevaliers (1271); Battle of Qaqun (1271); Second Battle of Homs (1281); Siege of Margat (1282); Fall of Tripoli (1289); Siege of Acre (1291); Hospitaller conquest of Rhodes; Battle of Amorgos (1312); Battle of Chios (1319); Battle of Rhodes (1320); Battle of Adramyttion (1334); Battle of Pallene (1344); Battle of Imbros (1347); Battle of Megara (1359); Battle of Tripoli (1367); Battle of Kosovo (1389); Battle of Nicopolis (1396); Siege of Smyrna (1402); Boucicaut expedition to Levant (1403); Siege of Rhodes (1444); Ottoman conquest of Lesbos (1462); Attack on Antalya (1472); Siege of Rhodes (1480); Battle of Karpathos (1498); Siege of Rhodes (1522); Attack on Modon (1531); Attack on Sousse (1537); Battle of Preveza (1538); Algiers expedition (1541); Capture of Mahdia (1550); Invasion of Gozo (1551); Siege of Tripoli (1551); Attack on Zuwarah (1552); Battle of Djerba (1560); Battle of Verbia (1561); Great Siege of Malta (1565); Action of 1570; Battle of Lepanto (1571); Battle of Pantelleria (1586); Action of 1595; Attack on Monastir (1603); Battle of Hammamet (1605); Battle of Paphos (1609); Raid on Żejtun (1614); Attack on Sousse (1619); Battle of Chios (1621); Battle of Palermo (1624); Battle of the Gulf of Tunis; Battle of the Dalmatian Coast; Action of 26 June 1625; Action of 28 September 1644; Battle of the Dardanelles (1656); Battle of the Dardanelles (1657); Siege of Chania (1660); Action of 27 August 1661; Djidjelli expedition (1664); Siege of Candia (1668); Action of 15 February 1700; Battle of Matapan (1717); Battle of Damietta (1732); Bombardment of Algiers (1784); French invasion of Malta (1798); Other service in European navies.

Commanders
- Notable commanders: Garnier de Nablus; Philippe Villiers de L'Isle-Adam; Jean Parisot de Valette

The Order of Knights of the Hospital of Saint John of Jerusalem, commonly known as the Knights Hospitaller (/ˈhɒspɪtələr/), (Note: Less commonly known as the Order of Saint John, the Knights of St. John or the Ioannites, the Knights of Rhodes (due to being based there between 1310–1522), and the Knights of Malta (based there between 1530–1798)) was a Catholic military order. It was founded in the crusader Kingdom of Jerusalem in the 12th century and had its headquarters there, in Jerusalem and Acre, until 1291, thereafter being based in Kolossi Castle in Cyprus (1302–1310), the island of Rhodes (1310–1522), Malta (1530–1798), and Saint Petersburg (1799–1801).

The Hospitallers arose in the early 12th century at the height of the Cluniac movement, a reformist movement within the Benedictine monastic order that sought to strengthen religious devotion and charity for the poor. Earlier in the 11th century, merchants from Amalfi founded a hospital in Jerusalem dedicated to John the Baptist where Benedictine monks cared for sick, poor, or injured Christian pilgrims to the Holy Land. Blessed Gerard, a lay brother of the Benedictine order, became its head when it was established. After the Christian conquest of Jerusalem in 1099 during the First Crusade, the Hospitallers rose in prominence and were recognized as a distinct order by Pope Paschal II in 1113.

The Order of Saint John was militarized in the 1120s and 1130s, hiring knights that later became Hospitallers. The organization became a military religious order under its own papal charter, charged with the care and defence of the Holy Land, and fought in the Crusades until the Siege of Acre in 1291. Following the reconquest of the Holy Land by Islamic forces, the knights operated from Rhodes, over which they were sovereign, and later from Malta, where they administered a vassal state under the Spanish viceroy of Sicily. The Hospitallers also controlled the North African city of Tripoli for two decades in the 16th century, and they were one of the smallest groups to have colonized parts of the Americas, briefly acquiring four Caribbean islands in the mid-17th century, which they turned over to France in the 1660s.

The knights became divided during the Protestant Reformation, when rich commanderies of the order in northern Germany and the Netherlands became Protestant and largely separated from the Catholic main stem, remaining separate to this day; modern ecumenical relations between the descendant chivalric orders are amicable. The order was suppressed in England, Denmark, and other parts of northern Europe, and was further damaged by the French occupation of Malta in 1798, after which it dispersed throughout Europe.

Today, five organizations continue the traditions of the Knights Hospitaller and have mutually recognized each other: the Sovereign Military Order of Malta, the Most Venerable Order of the Hospital of Saint John, the Bailiwick of Brandenburg of the Chivalric Order of Saint John, the Order of Saint John in the Netherlands, and the Order of Saint John in Sweden.

== History ==
=== Foundation and early history ===
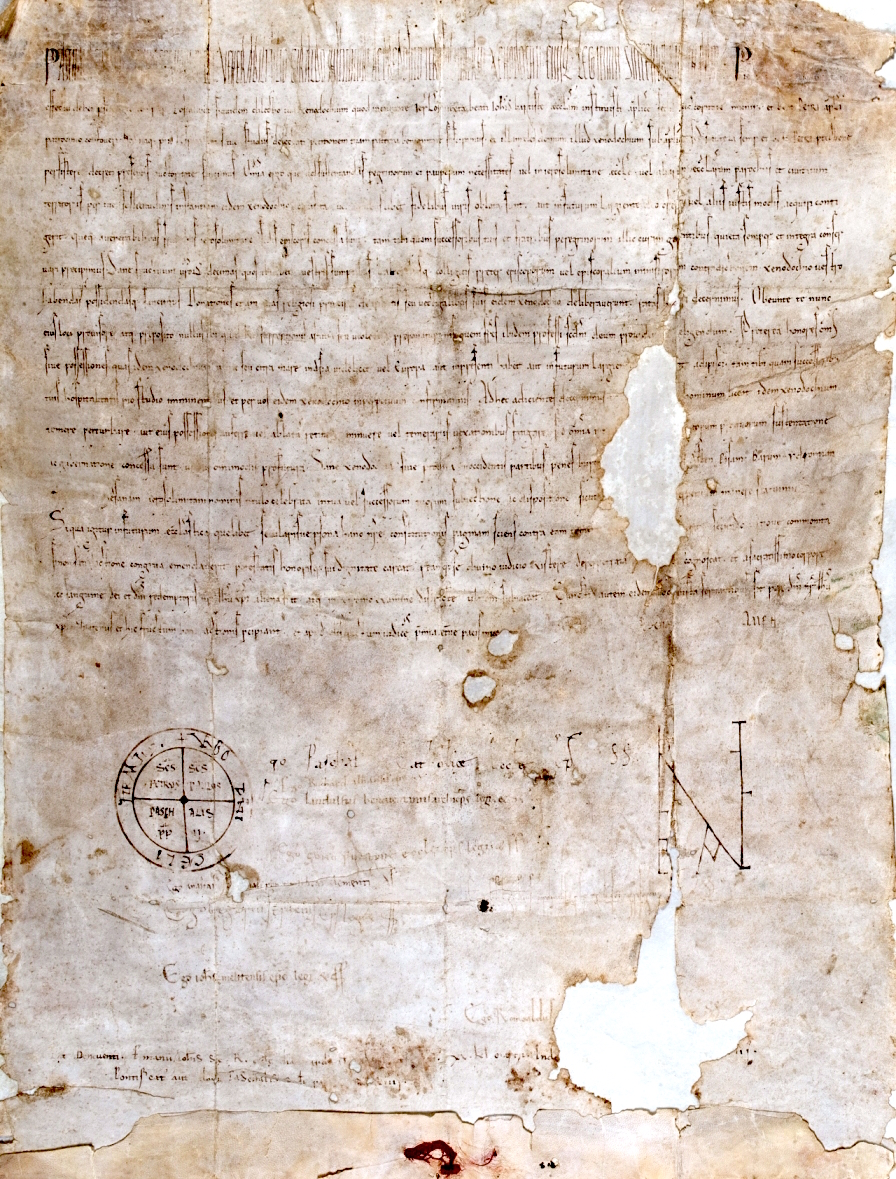
Pie postulatio voluntatis. Bull issued by Pope Paschal II in 1113 in favour of the Order of St. John of Jerusalem, which was to transform what was a community of pious men into an institution within the Church. By virtue of this document, the pope officially recognized the existence of the new organisation as an operative and militant part of the Roman Catholic Church, granting it papal protection and confirming its properties in Europe and Asia.

In 603, Pope Gregory I commissioned the Ravennate Abbot Probus, who was previously Gregory's emissary at the Lombard court, to build a hospital in Jerusalem to treat and care for Christian pilgrims to the Holy Land. In 800, Emperor Charlemagne enlarged Probus's hospital and added a library to it. About 200 years later, in 1009, the Fatimid caliph al-Hakim bi-Amr Allah destroyed the hospital and three thousand other buildings in Jerusalem.

Merchants from Amalfi in southern Italy were given permission by the Egyptian Fatimid Caliph al-Mustansir Billah (r. 1036–1094) to build a monastery in Jerusalem, near the Church of the Holy Sepulchre. The monastery, known as the abbey of St Mary of the Latins (to distinguish them from local Syriac Orthodox Church hierarchy), was served by the Order of Saint Benedict and took in Christian pilgrims travelling to visit the Christian holy sites. The increase in the number of pilgrims led the Benedictine monks to establish two hospitals in the late 1060s, one for men and one for women, with the former known as the Hospital of St John. They did this with the support of a wealthy Amalfian named Mauro of Pantaleone. In the early 1070s the hospital was visited by Archbishop John of Amalfi during his pilgrimage. In later centuries, to help raise money in Europe, the Order of St John made claims that the hospital had been founded more than a century before Christ by the high priest Menelaus and the Greek King Antiochus of Jerusalem, with financing from Judas Maccabeus, and that it was first headed by Saint Stephen and had been visited by Christ and the Apostles. A historian of the Order in the 13th century wrote that this version was not true. In any case, the Hospitallers rose to fame and prestige in a short amount of time.

By the time of the success of the First Crusade in 1099, the Hospital of St John was already well known among pilgrims and was regarded as a separate organization from the monastery of St Mary. The monastic brothers at the hospital saw it as their duty to provide the best possible treatment to the poor. They were given an endowment by Godfrey of Bouillon, the leader of the First Crusade, before he died in 1100. The Latin Patriarch of Jerusalem, Ghibbelin of Arles, formally recognized it as a separate entity from the monastery when he reformed the Catholic hierarchy in Palestine, and a step towards this was taken by Pope Paschal II when he recognized the abbey of St Mary as a church of the Holy See, placing it under his protection and exempting it from paying tithes on its land, on 19 June 1112. The monastic Hospitaller Order was formally created when the Pope issued the papal bull Pie postulatio voluntatis on 15 February 1113 to the head of the Hospital of St John, Blessed Gerardo Sasso. The Pope subordinated the hospital to his own authority and exempted it from paying tithes on the lands it owned, and gave the right to its professed brothers to elect their master. He also placed several other hospitals and hospices in southern Italy under the governance of the Hospital of St John in Jerusalem, as they were located at port cities from which pilgrims traveled to the Holy Land.

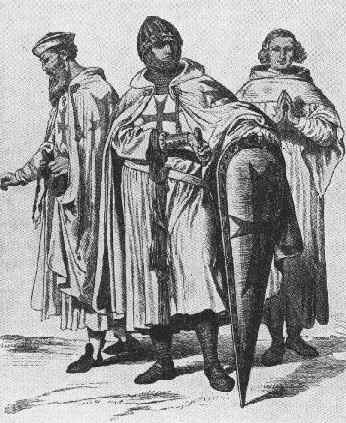
Knights Hospitaller in Jerusalem

Gerard acquired territory and revenues for his order throughout the Kingdom of Jerusalem and beyond. Under his successor, Raymond du Puy, the original hospice was expanded to an infirmary and by then was subordinated to the Latin Patriarch of Jerusalem at the Church of the Holy Sepulchre. Around this time the Hospital of St John became connected with that Church, and documents often referred to "the Holy Sepulchre and the Hospital of St John of Jerusalem." Initially, the Hospitallers cared for pilgrims as well as others (including Muslims and Jews) in Jerusalem, but the order soon extended to provide pilgrims with an armed escort before eventually becoming a significant military force. Thus, the Order of St. John imperceptibly became militaristic without losing its charitable character.

It is possible that the Hospital of St John hired knights or foot soldiers after the First Crusade to provide security, before it formally established its own military organization. Knights in western Europe left their horses and weapons to the Hospitallers in their wills in the 1120s, and, in the early 1140s, Pope Innocent II mentioned that the Hospitallers had "servants" to protect pilgrims. An account from a Hospitaller priest in the 16th century stated that, as the Order of St John became wealthier, it hired knights to defend its hospitals and pilgrims, and these knights eventually became Hospitallers themselves. It is known that secular knights and soldiers were hired by institutions in Jerusalem to provide protection after 1099, including churches, and some of them later joined military orders. The Order of Knights Templar was founded around 1119–1120 and it is likely that the Hospitallers were inspired by them to have their own knights. A charter made for a gift to the Hospital of St John in a Christian army on 17 January 1126 recorded that a brother from the Order was present as a witness and that he held a military title.

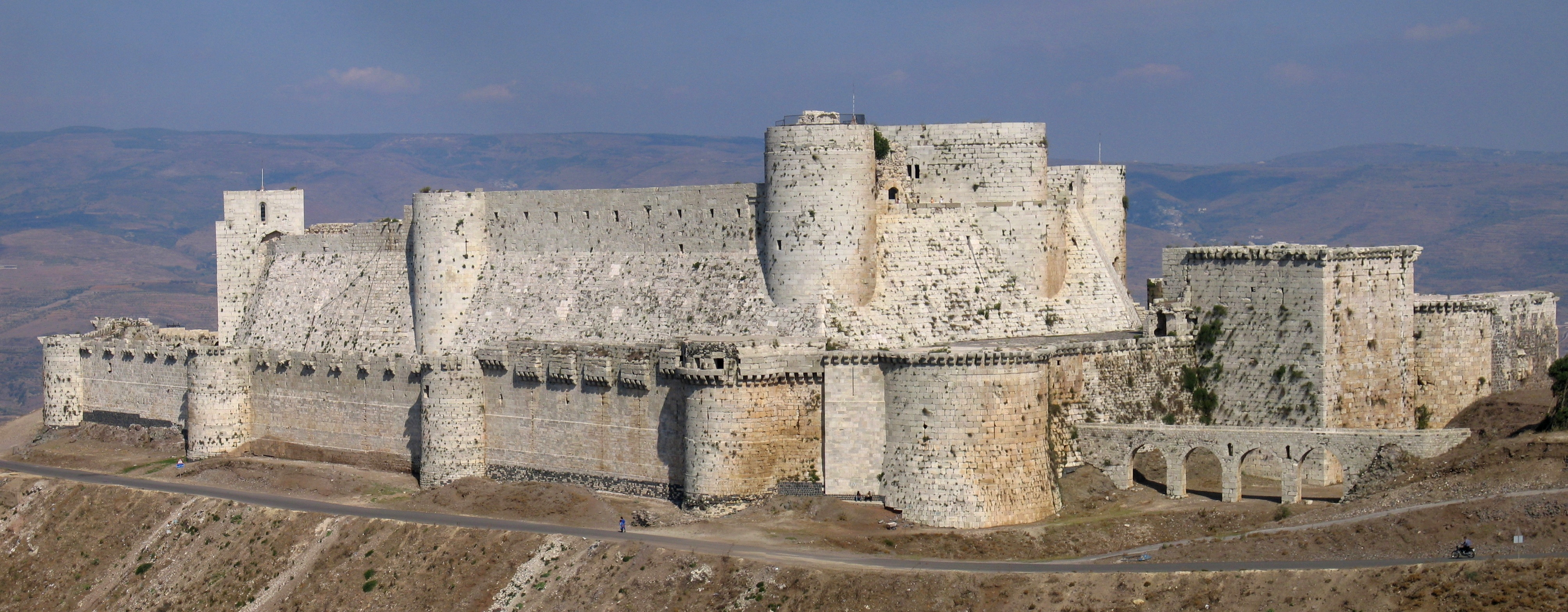
Krak des Chevaliers, a castle acquired by the Hospitallers in Syria

Raymond du Puy, who succeeded Gerard as master of the hospital in 1120, is credited with establishing the military element of the Order. Raymond decided some time before 1136 that Hospitallers could fight to defend the kingdom or to besiege a pagan city. The Knights Hospitaller, like the other military orders, organized its fighting members into the ranks of knight and sergeant. In 1130, Pope Innocent II gave the order its coat of arms, a plain silver cross in a field of red, to differentiate them from the Templars. The other symbol of the Hospitallers, the "eight-pointed cross", is said to have originated in the Byzantine Empire before reaching the Duchy of Amalfi in Italy, and it was later used in Jerusalem by the monks that founded the Hospital of St John. After the Hospitallers moved to Malta, it became known as the Maltese cross.

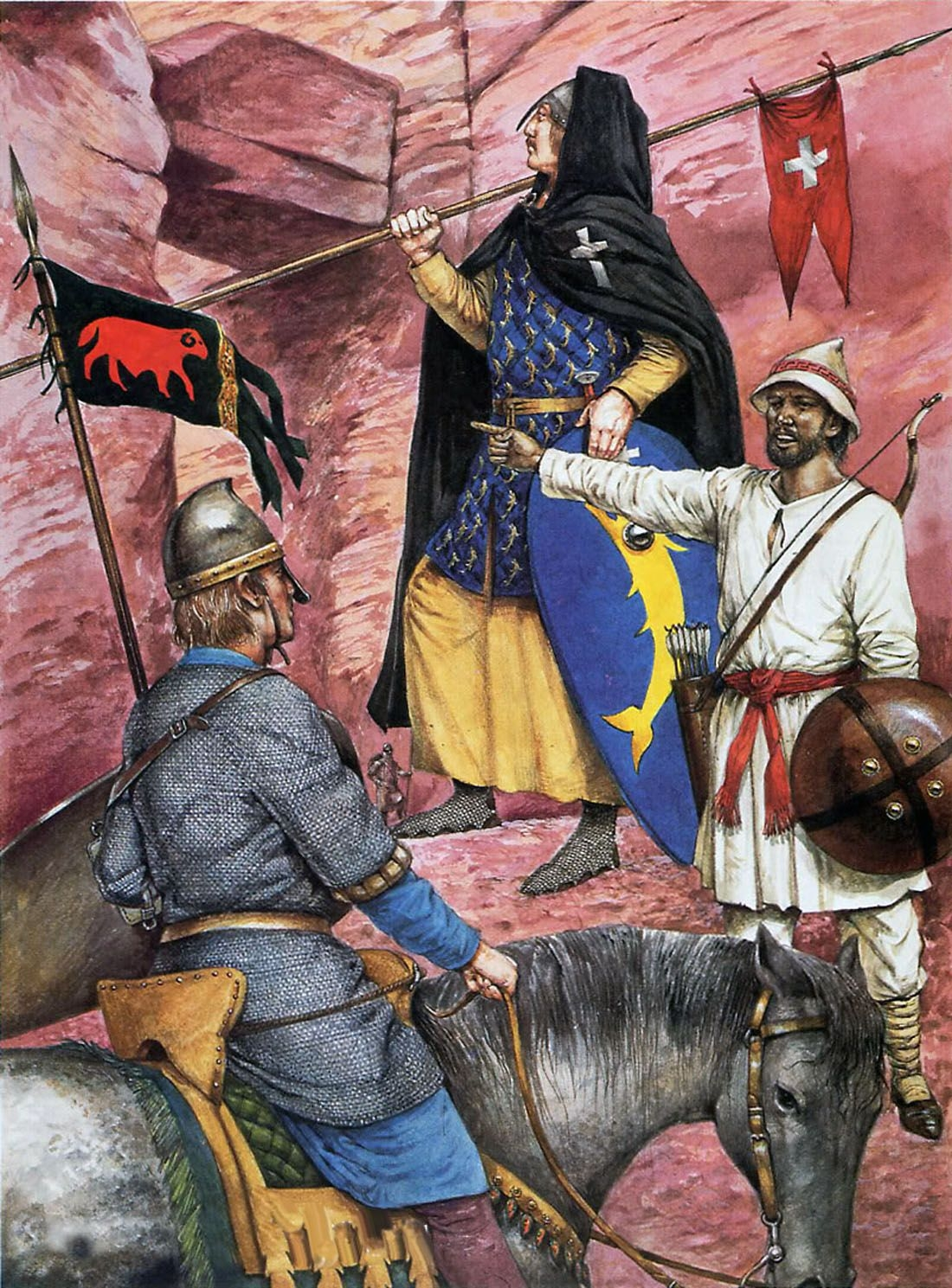
Maronite archer guiding a Knight Hospitaller and Northern Italian Crusader through Wadi Numeira to the Kerak plateau

King Fulk of Jerusalem constructed several castles to defend the kingdom's southern border from attacks by the Fatimid garrison at Ascalon, and allowed the Hospitallers to manage one of them in 1136, the castle of Bethgibelin. This castle also allowed them to defend the pilgrim route between Jaffa and Jerusalem. Later in the century, the Hospitallers were given control over more castles in Syria than they had in the Kingdom of Jerusalem. In the next several decades after 1136 the Order was granted more castles and towns by nobles that needed assistance in defending them, especially in the County of Tripoli and the Principality of Antioch. Those notably included the Krak des Chevaliers in 1142, which they received from Raymond II, Count of Tripoli. According to one estimate the Hospitallers had 25 castles as of 1180. In addition to defending them, the Hospitallers also undertook construction projects to build new castles or repair and expand existing ones, with an example of the latter being Krak des Chevaliers.

One of the first battles that the Knights Hospitaller fought in was the Siege of Ascalon in 1153. After a group of Knights Templar, led by their Grand Master, Bernard de Tremelay, entered the besieged fortress and were all killed, King Baldwin III of Jerusalem wanted to withdraw, but Raymond du Puy convinced him to continue, and the fort surrendered to the Crusaders on 22 August 1153. It is not clear if the role of the Hospitallers was only advisory or if they were involved in the fighting at Ascalon.

The Hospitallers and the Knights Templar became the most formidable military orders in the Holy Land. Frederick Barbarossa, the Holy Roman Emperor, pledged his protection to the Knights of St. John in a charter of privileges granted in 1185. In order to protect the road of the Camino de Santiago, the Order of Saint John generously received the hospital, commandery and convent of San Juan de Acre in Navarrete, La Rioja, founded in 1185 by María Ramírez de Medrano, Lady of Fuenmayor, built by her son Martín de Baztán y Medrano, bishop of Osma in Soria. Active in the Kingdom of Toledo (a border area with Islam from the 12th to the 13th centuries) since 1144, the order had their largest holding in the kingdom in the Campo de San Juan.

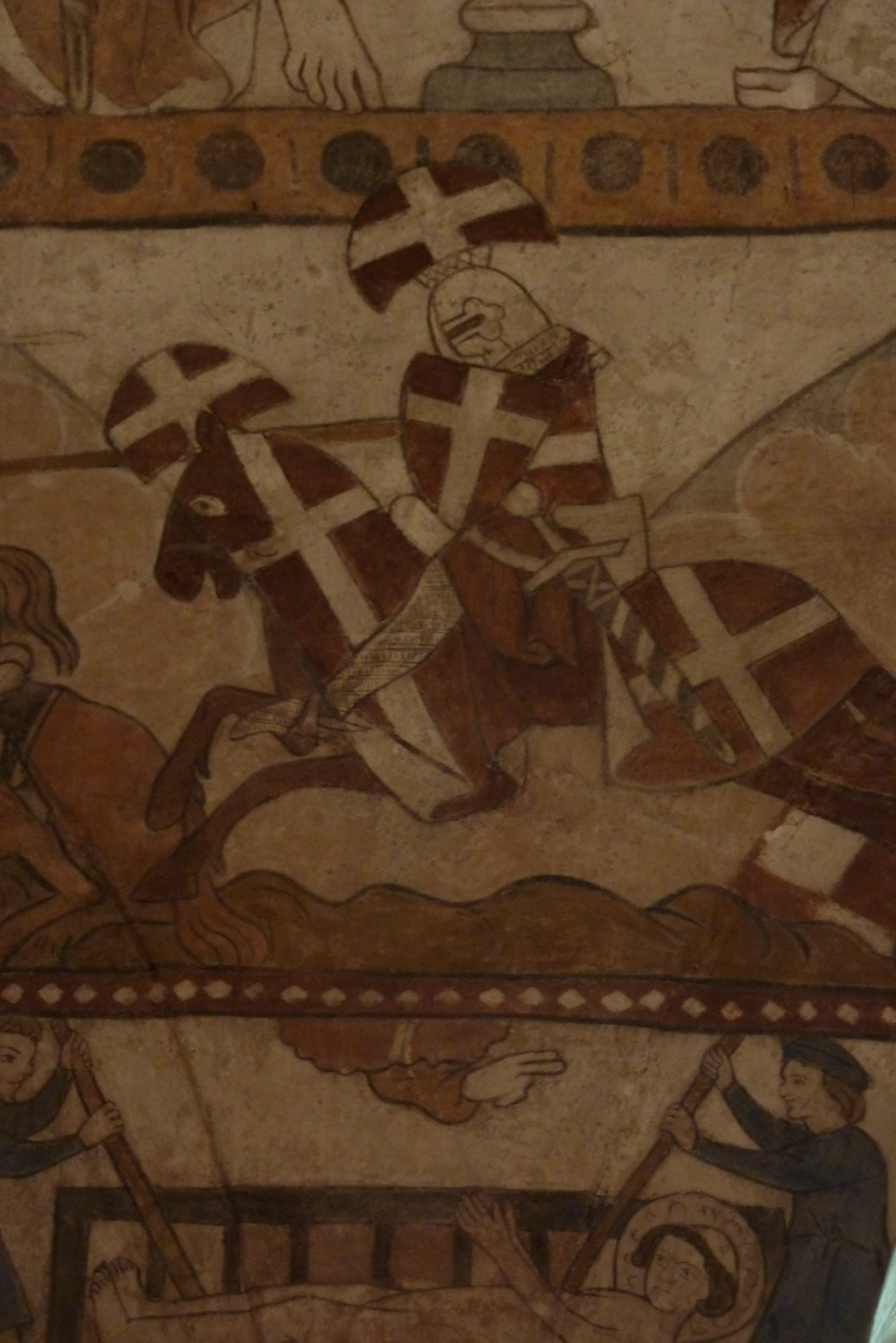
A Hospitaller depicted in a church painting

The statutes of Roger de Moulins (1187) deal only with the service of the sick; the first mention of military service is in the statutes of the ninth grand master, Fernando Afonso of Portugal (about 1200). In the latter, a marked distinction is made between secular knights, externs to the order, who served only for a time, and the professed knights, attached to the order by a perpetual vow, and who alone enjoyed the same spiritual privileges as the other religious. The order numbered three distinct classes of membership: the military brothers, the brothers infirmarians, and the brothers chaplains, to whom was entrusted the divine service.

In 1248, Pope Innocent IV (1243–1254) approved a standard military dress for the Hospitallers to be worn during battle. Instead of a closed cape over their armour (which restricted their movements), they wore a red surcoat with a white cross emblazoned on it.

Many of the more substantial Christian fortifications in the Holy Land were built by the Templars and the Hospitallers. At the height of the Kingdom of Jerusalem, the Hospitallers held seven great forts and 140 other estates in the area. The two largest of these, their bases of power in the Kingdom and in the Principality of Antioch, were the Krak des Chevaliers and Margat in Syria. The property of the Order was divided into priories, subdivided into bailiwicks, which in turn were divided into commanderies.

As early as the late 12th century, the order had begun to achieve recognition in the Kingdom of England and Duchy of Normandy. As a result, buildings such as St John's Jerusalem and the Knights Gate, Quenington in England were built on land donated to the order by local nobility. An Irish house was established at Kilmainham, near Dublin, and the Irish Prior was usually a key figure in Irish public life.

The Knights also received the "Land of Severin" (Terra de Zeurino), along with the nearby mountains, from Béla IV of Hungary, as shown by a charter of grant issued on 2 June 1247. The Banate of Severin was a march, or border province, of the Kingdom of Hungary between the Lower Danube and the Olt River, today part of Romania, and back then bordered across the Danube by a powerful Bulgarian Empire. The Hospitaller hold on the Banate was only brief.

=== Knights of Cyprus and Rhodes ===
After the fall of the Kingdom of Jerusalem in 1291 (the city of Jerusalem had fallen in 1187), the Knights were confined to the County of Tripoli and, when Acre was captured in 1291, the order sought refuge in the Kingdom of Cyprus. Finding themselves becoming enmeshed in Cypriot politics, their Master, Guillaume de Villaret, created a plan of acquiring their own temporal domain, selecting Rhodes, then part of the Byzantine Empire. He also reorganised the order into eight langues, or "tongues", corresponding to a geographic or ethno-linguistic area: Aragon, Auvergne, Castile, England, France, the Holy Roman Empire, Italy and Provence. Each was administered by a Prior or, if there was more than one priory in the langue, by a Grand Prior.

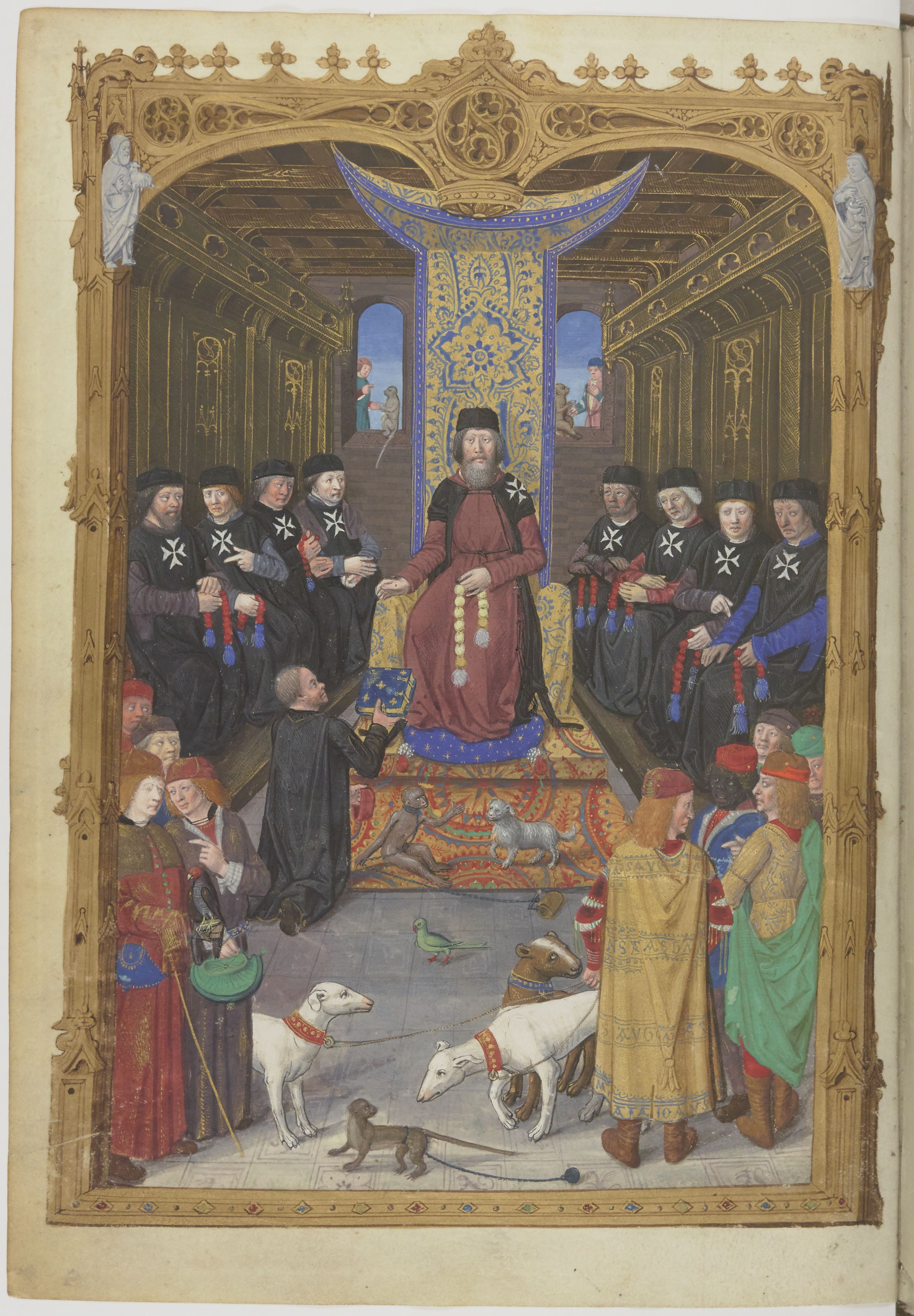
Grand Master Pierre d'Aubusson with senior knights, wearing the "Rhodian cross" on their habits (Note: Dedicatory miniature in Gestorum Rhodie obsidionis commentarii (account of the Siege of Rhodes of 1480), BNF Lat 6067 fol. 3v, dated 1483/4.)

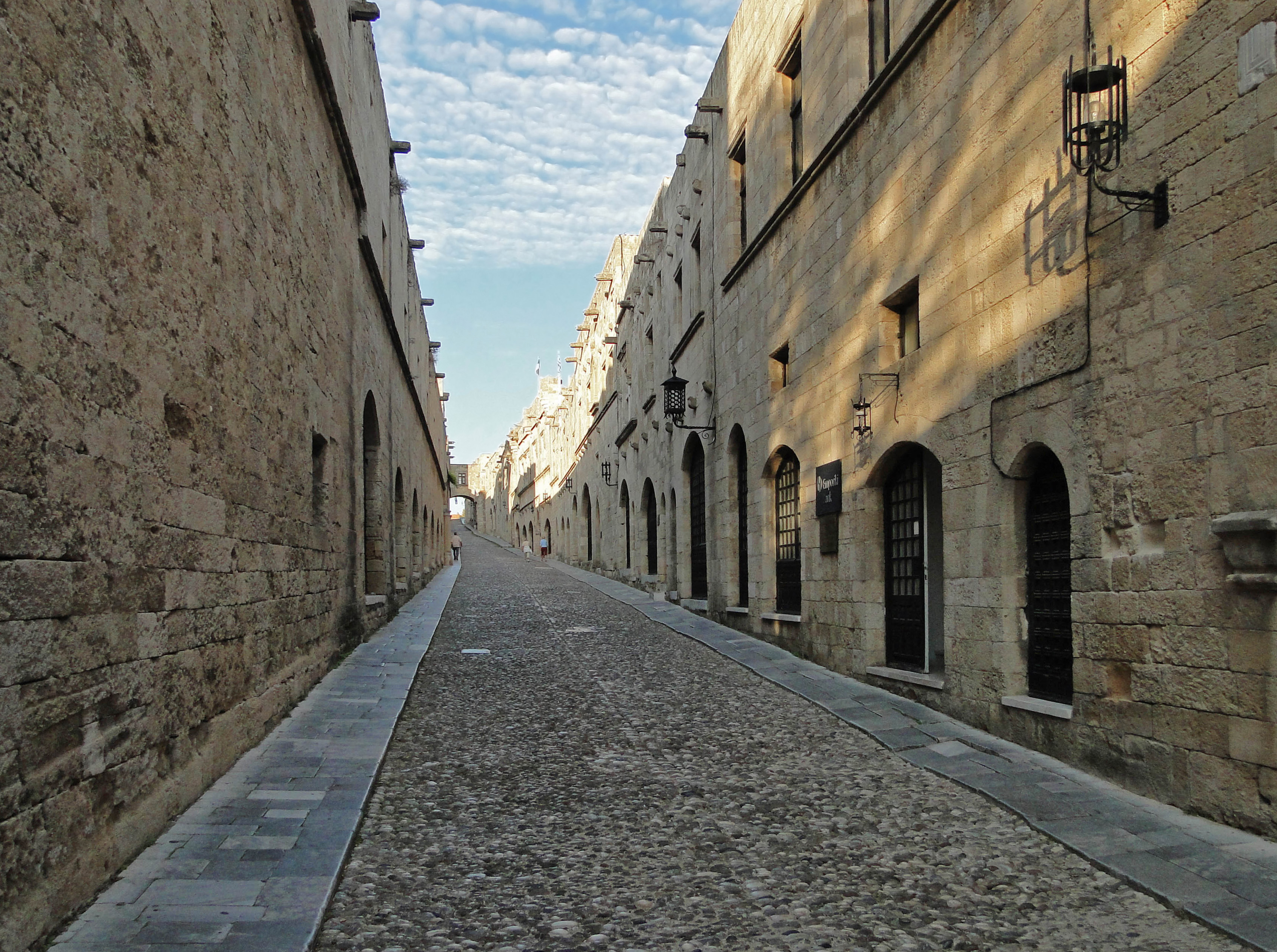
Street of Knights in Rhodes

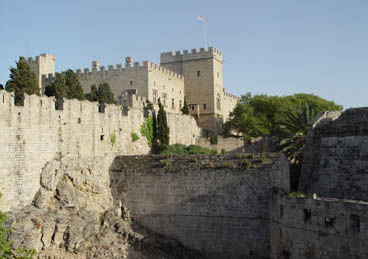
The Knights' castle at Rhodes

Guillaume's successor, Foulques de Villaret, executed the plan to take Rhodes, and on 15 August 1310, after more than four years of campaigning, the city of Rhodes surrendered to the knights. They also gained control of a number of neighbouring islands and the Anatolian port of Halicarnassus and the island of Kastellorizo. Not long after, in 1312, Pope Clement V dissolved the Hospitallers' rival order, the Knights Templar, with a series of papal bulls, including the Ad providam bull that turned over much of their property to the Hospitallers. At Rhodes, and later Malta, the resident knights of each langue were headed by a bailiff. The English Grand Prior at the time was Philip De Thame, who acquired the estates allocated to the English langue from 1330 to 1358.

On Rhodes, the Hospitallers, by then also referred to as the Knights of Rhodes, were forced to become a more militarized force. In 1334, they fought an attempted invasion by Andronicus and his Turkish auxiliaries, and in 1374 they took over the defence of nearby Smyrna on the Anatolian coast, which had been conquered by a crusade in 1344; the knights held the city until it was besieged and taken by Timur in 1402. On the peninsula of Halicarnassus (present-day Bodrum), the knights reinforced their position with the construction of Petronium Castle, utilizing pieces of the partially destroyed Mausoleum at Halicarnassus, one of the Seven Wonders of the Ancient World, to strengthen their rampart.

In the 15th century, the knights fought frequently with Barbary pirates, also known as Ottoman corsairs. They withstood two invasions by ascendant Muslim forces, one by the Sultan of Egypt in 1444 and another by Ottoman Sultan Mehmed the Conqueror in 1480, who, after capturing Constantinople and defeating the Byzantine Empire in 1453, made the Knights a priority target.

Rhodes and other possessions of the Knights Hospitallers of St. John

In 1522, an entirely new sort of force arrived: 400 ships under the command of Sultan Suleiman the Magnificent deployed as many as 100,000 men to the island, and possibly up 200,000. Under Grand Master Philippe Villiers de L'Isle-Adam, the knights, though well-fortified, only had about 7,000 men-at-arms. The siege lasted six months, after which the defeated surviving Hospitallers were allowed to withdraw to Sicily. Despite the defeat, both Christians and Muslims seem to have regarded Phillipe Villiers as extremely valiant, and the Grand Master was proclaimed a Defender of the Faith by Pope Adrian VI.

=== Knights of Malta ===
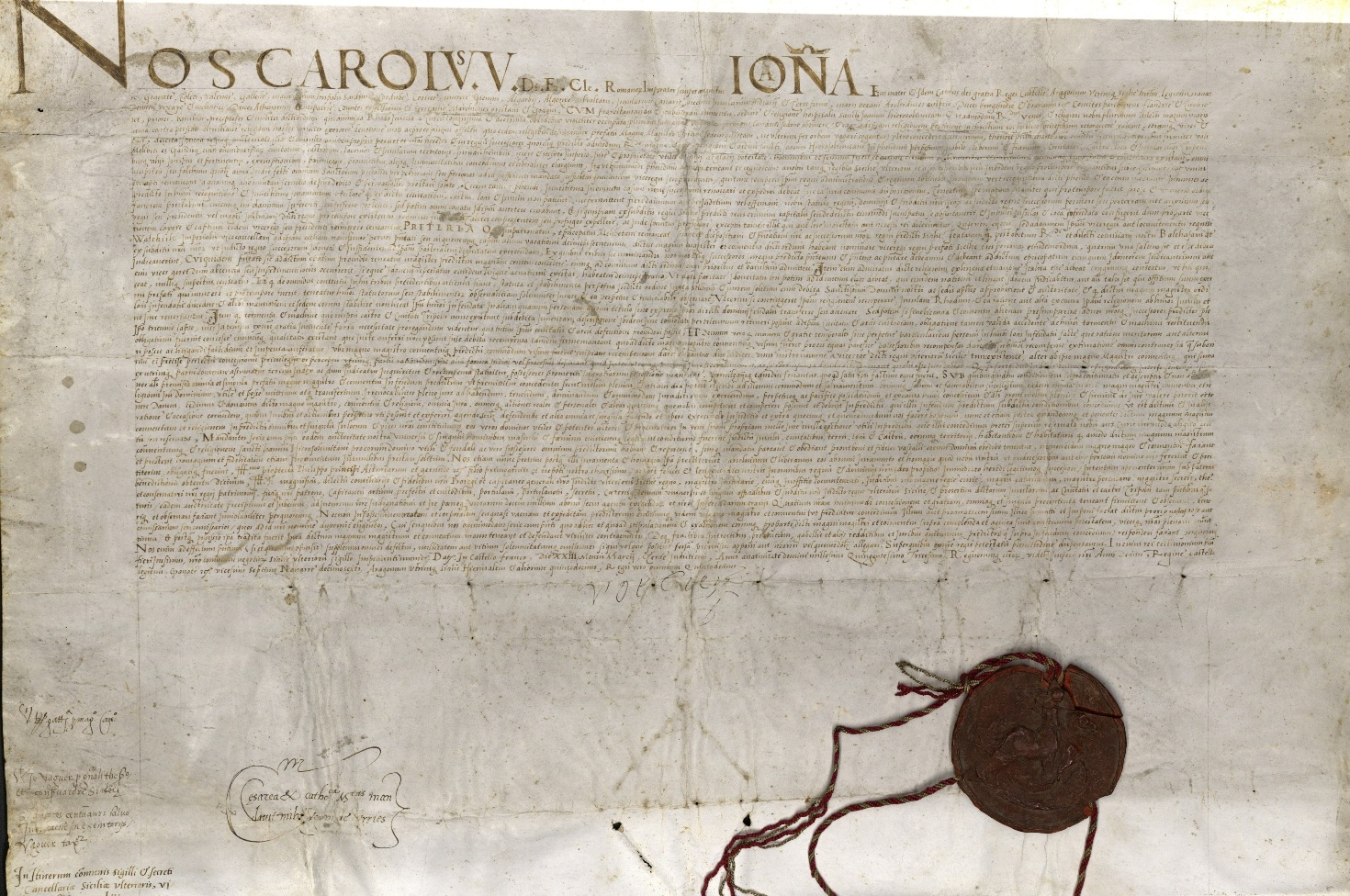
Deed of Donation of Malta, Gozo and Tripoli to the Order of St John by Emperor Charles V in 1530

In 1530, after seven years of displacement from Rhodes, Pope Clement VII – himself a knight – reached an agreement with Charles V, Holy Roman Emperor and King of Spain and Sicily, to provide the knights permanent quarters: In exchange for providing Malta, Gozo, and the North African port of Tripoli in perpetual fiefdom, Charles V would receive an annual fee of a single Maltese falcon (the Tribute of the Maltese Falcon), which they were to send on All Souls' Day to the king's representative, the Viceroy of Sicily. (Note: This historical fact was used as the plot hook in Dashiell Hammett's famous novel The Maltese Falcon.) In 1548, Charles V raised Heitersheim, the headquarters of the Hospitallers in Germany, into the Principality of Heitersheim, making the Grand Prior of Germany a prince of the Holy Roman Empire with a seat and vote in the Reichstag.

The knights would stay in Malta for the next 268 years, transforming what they called "merely a rock of soft sandstone" into a flourishing island with mighty defences, whose capital city, Valletta, would become known as Superbissima, "Most Proud", among the great powers of Europe. However, the indigenous islanders were initially apprehensive about the order's presence and viewed them as arrogant intruders; they were especially loathed for taking advantage of local women. Most knights were French and excluded Maltese from serving in the order, even being generally dismissive of local nobility. However, the two groups coexisted peacefully, since the Knights boosted the economy, were charitable, and protected against Muslim attacks.

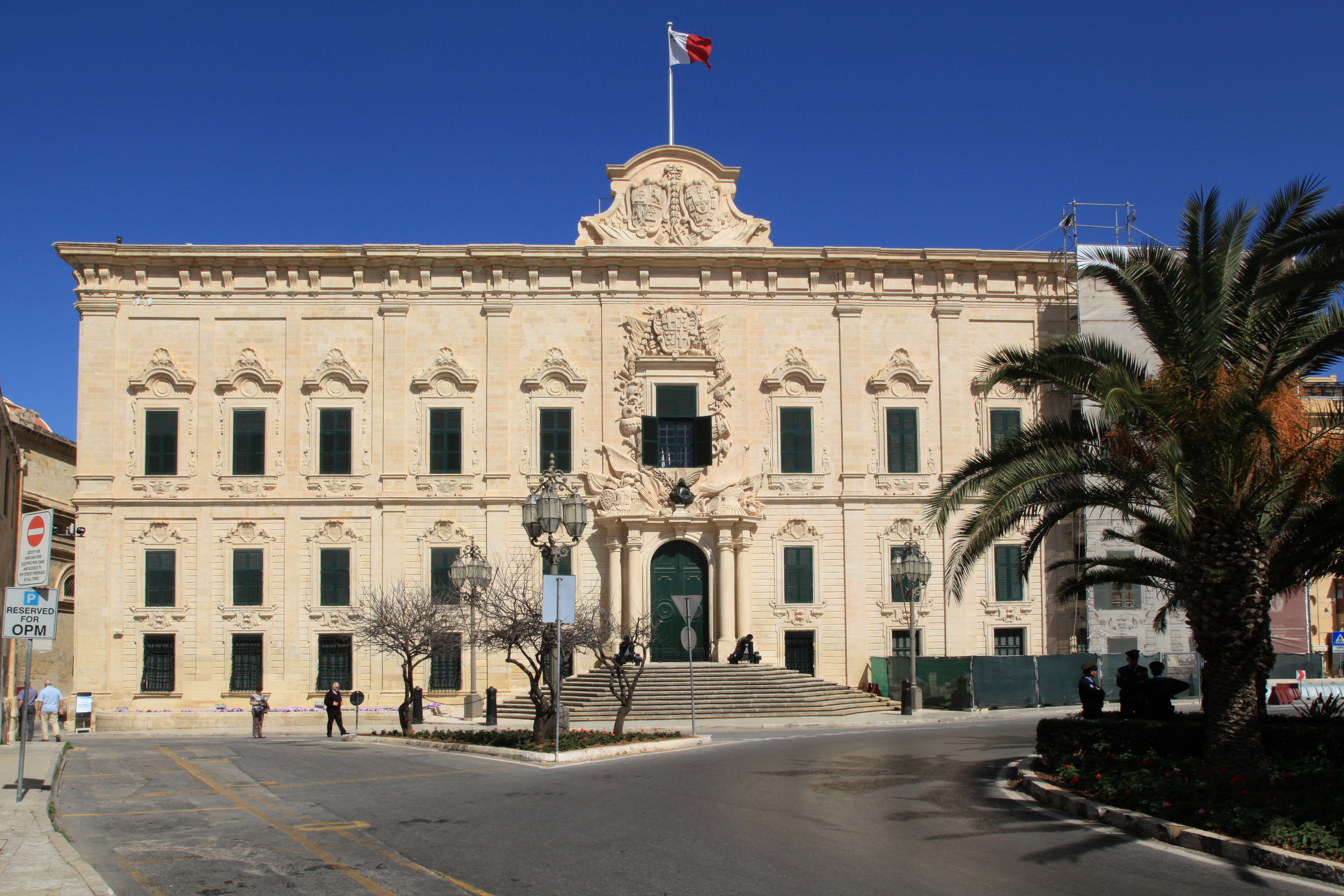
Auberge de Castille et Portugal in Valletta, an example of 18th-century Baroque architecture built by the Order.

Hospitals were among the first projects to be undertaken in Malta, where French soon supplanted Italian as the official language (though the native inhabitants continued to speak Maltese among themselves). The knights also constructed fortresses, watch towers, and naturally, churches. Its acquisition of Malta signalled the beginning of the Order's renewed naval activity.

The Order may have played a direct part in supporting the Malta native Iacob Heraclid who, in 1561, established a temporary foothold in Moldavia. The Hospitallers also continued their maritime actions against Muslims and especially the Barbary pirates. Although they had only a few ships, they quickly drew the ire of the Ottomans, who were unhappy to see the order resettled. In 1565 Suleiman sent an invasion force of about 40,000 men to besiege the 700 knights and 8,000 soldiers and expel them from Malta and gain a new base from which to possibly launch another assault on Europe. This is known as the Great Siege of Malta.

At first the battle went as badly for the Hospitallers as Rhodes had: most of the cities were destroyed and about half the knights killed. On 18 August, the position of the besieged was becoming desperate: dwindling daily in numbers, they were becoming too feeble to hold the long line of fortifications. But when his council suggested the abandonment of Birgu and Senglea and withdrawal to Fort St. Angelo, Grand Master Jean Parisot de Valette refused.

The Viceroy of Sicily had not sent help; possibly the Viceroy's orders from Philip II of Spain were so obscurely worded as to put on his own shoulders the burden of the decision whether to help the Order at the expense of his own defences. A wrong decision could mean defeat and exposing Sicily and Naples to the Ottomans. He had left his own son with La Valette, so he could hardly be indifferent to the fate of the fortress. Whatever may have been the cause of his delay, the Viceroy hesitated until the battle had almost been decided by the unaided efforts of the knights, before being forced to move by the indignation of his own officers.

On 23 August came yet another grand assault, the last serious effort, as it proved, of the besiegers. It was thrown back with the greatest difficulty, even the wounded taking part in the defence. The plight of the Turkish forces was now desperate. With the exception of Fort Saint Elmo, the fortifications were still intact. Working night and day the garrison had repaired the breaches, and the capture of Malta seemed more and more impossible. Many of the Ottoman troops in crowded quarters had fallen ill over the terrible summer months. Ammunition and food were beginning to run short, and the Ottoman troops were becoming increasingly dispirited by the failure of their attacks and their losses. The death on 23 June of skilled commander Dragut, a corsair and admiral of the Ottoman fleet, was a serious blow. The Turkish commanders, Piali Pasha and Mustafa Pasha, were careless. They had a huge fleet which they used with effect on only one occasion. They neglected their communications with the African coast and made no attempt to watch and intercept Sicilian reinforcements.

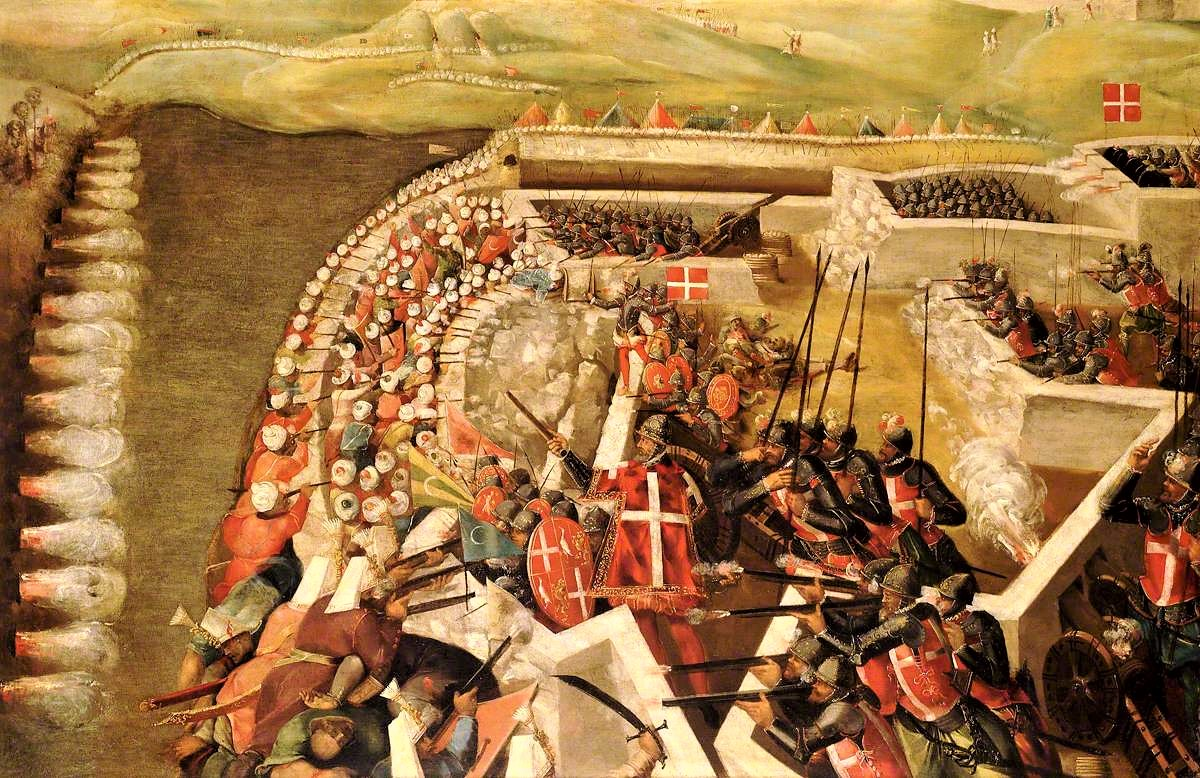
Ottoman attack on the post of the Castilian knights on 21 August 1565

On 1 September they made their last effort, but the morale of the Ottoman troops had deteriorated seriously and the attack was feeble, to the great encouragement of the besieged, who now began to see hopes of deliverance. The perplexed and indecisive Ottomans heard of the arrival of Sicilian reinforcements in Mellieħa Bay. Unaware that the force was very small, they broke off the siege and left on 8 September. The Great Siege of Malta may have been the last action in history in which a force of knights won a decisive victory against a numerically superior force that made use of firearms. When the Ottomans departed, the Hospitallers had but 600 men able to bear arms. The most reliable estimate puts the number of the Ottoman army at its height at some 40,000 men, of whom 15,000 eventually returned to Constantinople. The siege is portrayed vividly in the frescoes of Matteo Pérez in the Hall of St. Michael and St. George, also known as the Throne Room, in the Grandmaster's Palace in Valletta; four of the original modellos, painted in oils by Perez d'Aleccio between 1576 and 1581, can be found in the Cube Room of the Queen's House at Greenwich, London. After the siege a new city had to be built: the present capital city of Malta, named Valletta in memory of the Grand Master who had withstood the siege.

The building and fortification of Valletta, named for Grand Master la Valette, was begun in 1566, soon becoming the home port of one of the Mediterranean's most powerful navies. Valletta was designed by Francesco Laparelli, a military engineer, and his work was then taken up by Girolamo Cassar. The city was completed in 1571. The island's hospitals were expanded as well. The Sacra Infermeria could accommodate 500 patients and was famous as one of the finest in the world. In the vanguard of medicine, the Hospital of Malta included Schools of Anatomy, Surgery and Pharmacy. Valletta itself was renowned as a centre of art and culture. The Conventual Church of St. John, completed in 1577, contains works by Caravaggio and others.

In Europe, most of the Order's hospitals and chapels survived the Reformation, though not in Protestant or Evangelical countries. In Malta, meanwhile, the Public Library was established in 1761. The University was founded seven years later, followed, in 1786, by a School of Mathematics and Nautical Sciences. Despite these developments, some of the Maltese grew to resent the Order, which they viewed as a privileged class. This even included some of the local nobility, who were not admitted to the Order.

In Rhodes, the knights had been housed in auberges (inns) segregated by Langues. This structure was maintained in Birgu (1530–1571) and then Valletta (from 1571). The auberges in Birgu remain, mostly undistinguished 16th-century buildings. Valletta still has the auberges of Castile and Portugal (1574; renovated 1741 by Grand Master de Vilhena, now the Prime Minister's offices), Italy (renovated 1683 by Grand Master Carafa, now an art museum), Aragon (1571, now a government ministry), Bavaria (former Palazzo Carnerio, purchased in 1784 for the newly formed Langue, now occupied by the Lands Authority) and Provence (now National Museum of Archaeology). In the Second World War, the auberge d'Auvergne was damaged (and later replaced by Law Courts) and the auberge de France was destroyed.

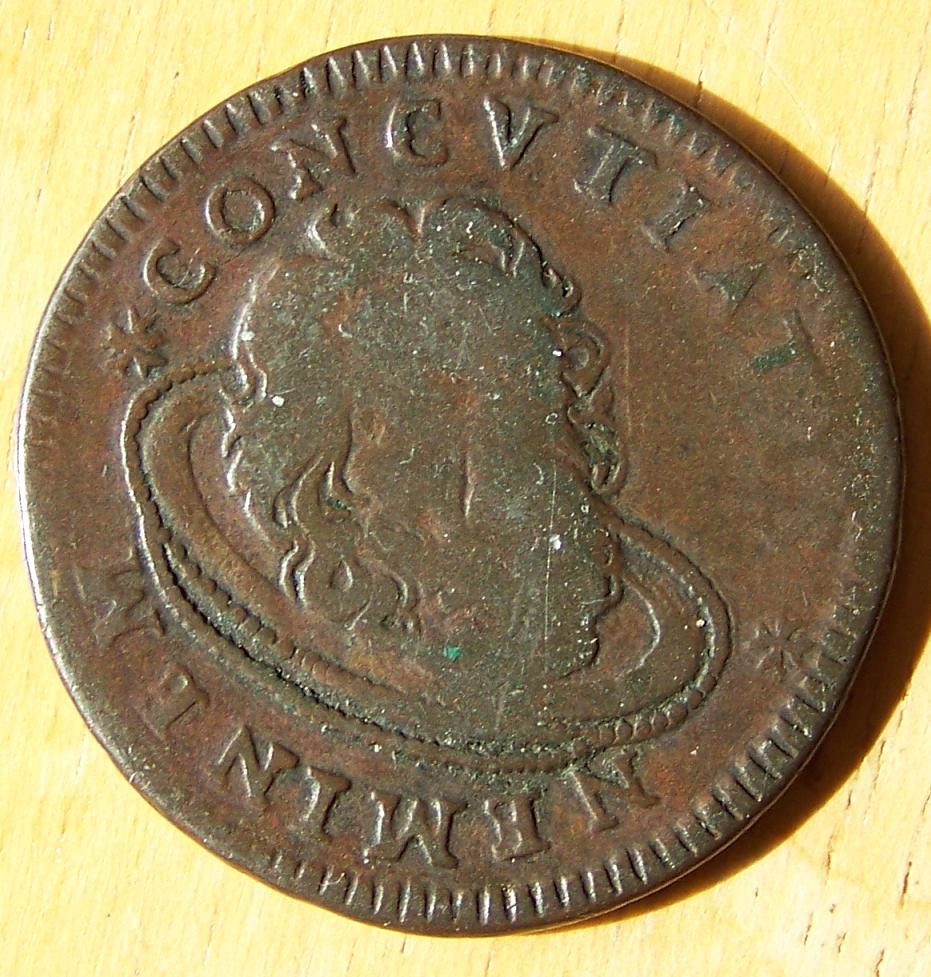
A 1742 Tarì coin of the Knights Hospitaller, depicting the head of John the Baptist on a platter

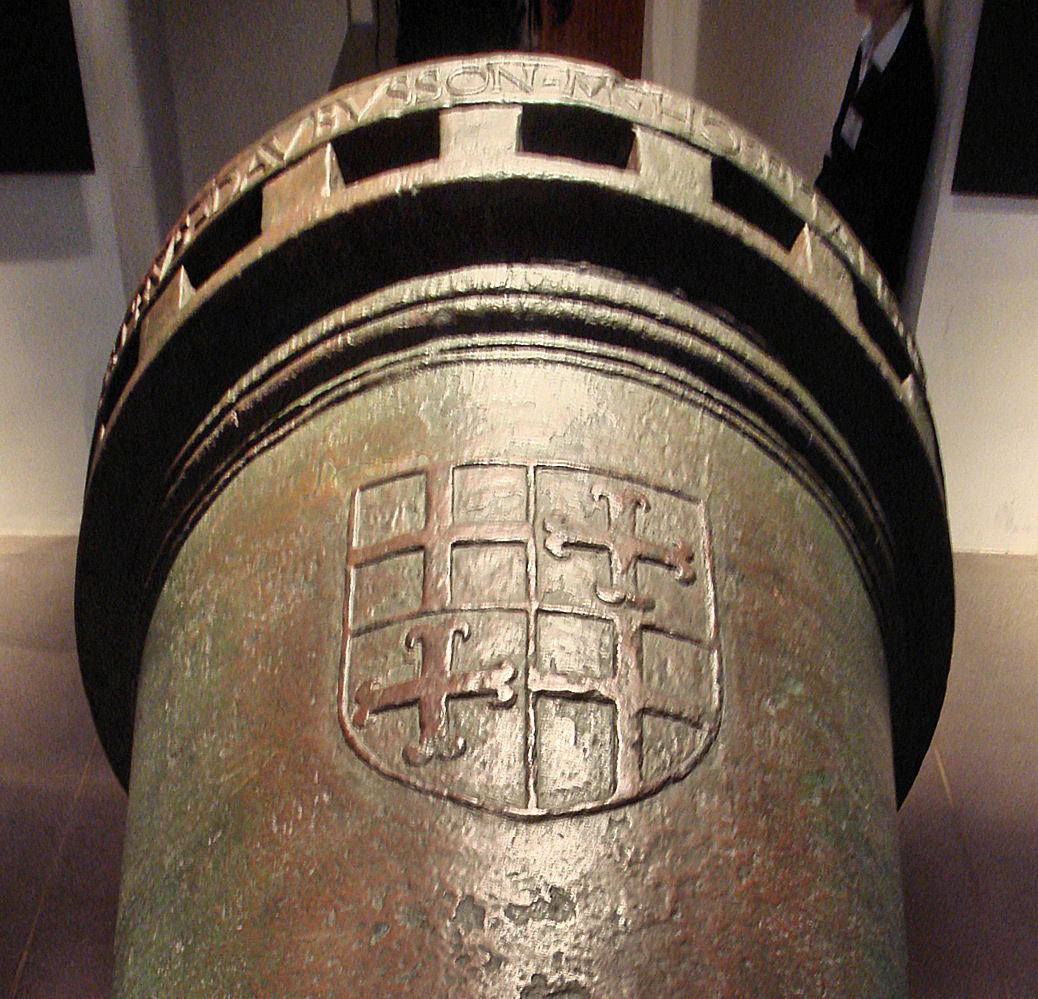
Arms of the Knights Hospitallers, quartered with those of Pierre d'Aubusson, on a bombard

In 1604, each Langue was given a chapel in the conventual church of Saint John and the arms of the Langue appear in the decoration on the walls and ceiling:

- Provence: Michael the Archangel, Jerusalem
- Auvergne: Saint Sebastian, Azure a dolphin or
- France: conversion of Paul the Apostle, France
- Castile, León and Portugal: James, brother of Jesus, Quarterly Castile and León
- Aragon: Saint George [the church of the Langue is consecrated to Our Lady of the Pillar Per pale Aragon and Navarre]
- Italy: St Catherine, Azure the word ITALIA in bend or
- England: Flagellation of Christ, [no arms visible; in Rhodes the Langue used the arms of England, quarterly France and England]
- Germany: Epiphany, Austria born by a double-headed eagle displayed sable

=== 17th century ===
In 1605, Tomás Fernández de Medrano, Lord and Divisero of Valdeosera and a Knight of the Order of Saint John under the habit of Prince Emmanuel Philibert of Savoy, printed a brief from Pope Paul V in Latin and Spanish for King Philip III of Spain and the Order of Saint John, titled: Brief of Our Most Holy Father Pope Paul V in Confirmation of the Privileges of the Order of St. John of Jerusalem by Tomás Fernández de Medrano at his own expense, secretary to the Serene Princes of Savoy and the Holy Chapters and Assemblies of Castile on behalf of his King and knights of the Order of Saint John. It is dedicated to the Duke of Lerma, as protector of all religions and in particular, the Order of Saint John.

In 1607, the Grand Master of the Hospitallers was granted the status of Reichsfürst (Prince of the Holy Roman Empire), even though the Order's territory was always south of the Holy Roman Empire. In 1630, he was awarded ecclesiastic equality with cardinals, and the unique hybrid style His Most Eminent Highness, reflecting both qualities qualifying him as a true Prince of the Church.

=== Reconquista of the sea ===
Flag of the Maltese corsairs, as shown in various period reproductions in Liam Gauci's In the Name of the Prince: Maltese Corsairs 1760–1798

With their diminished strength and relocation to Malta in the central Mediterranean, the knights found themselves devoid of their founding mission: assisting and joining the crusades in the Holy Land. Revenues subsequently dwindled as European sponsors were no longer willing to support a costly and seemingly redundant organization. The knights were forced to make do with their maritime location and turn to combating the increased threat of piracy, particularly from the Ottoman-endorsed Barbary pirates operating out of North Africa. Boosted by an air of invincibility following the successful defence of their island in 1565, and compounded by the Christian victory over the Ottoman fleet in the Battle of Lepanto in 1571, the knights set about protecting Christian merchant shipping to and from the Levant and freeing the captured Christian slaves who formed the basis of the Barbary corsairs' piratical trading and navies. This campaign became known as the "Corso".

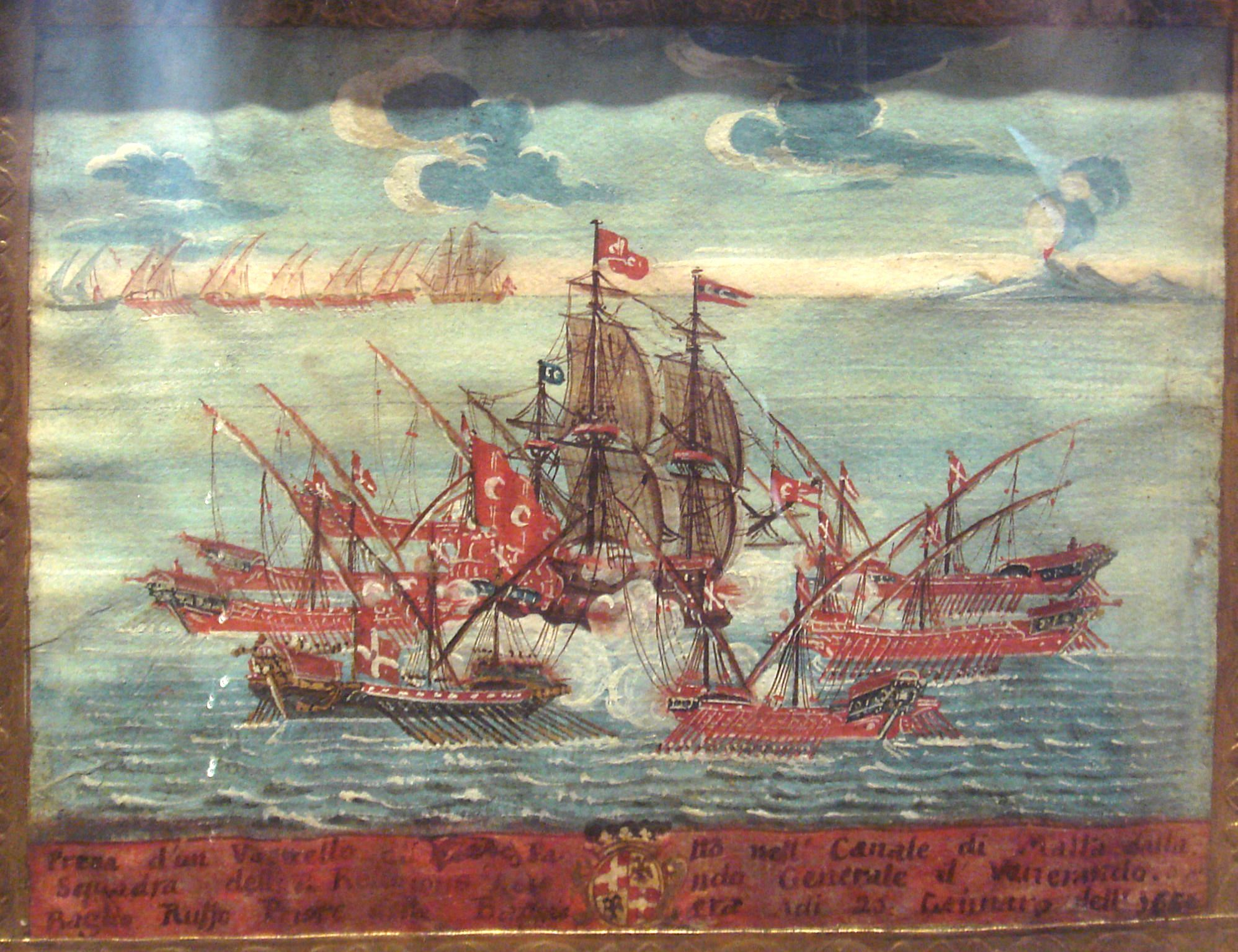
Hospitaller galleys capturing an Ottoman vessel in the Malta Channel in 1652

Yet the Order soon struggled on a now reduced income. By policing the Mediterranean, they augmented the assumed responsibility of the traditional protectors of the Mediterranean, the naval city states of Venice and Genoa. Further compounding their financial woes; over the course of this period, the exchange rate of the local currencies against the 'scudo' that were established in the late 16th century gradually became outdated, meaning the knights were gradually receiving less at merchant factories. Economically hindered by the barren island they now inhabited, many knights went beyond their call of duty by raiding Muslim ships. More and more ships were plundered, from whose profits many knights lived idly and luxuriously, taking local women to be their wives and enrolling in the navies of France and Spain in search of adventure, experience, and yet more money.

The Knights' changing attitudes were coupled with the effects of the Reformation and Counter-Reformation and the lack of stability from the Roman Catholic Church. All this affected the knights strongly as the 16th and 17th centuries saw a gradual decline in the religious attitudes of many of the Christian peoples of Europe (and, concomitantly, the importance of a religious army), and thus in the Knights' regular tributes from European nations. That the knights, a chiefly Roman Catholic military order, pursued the readmittance of England as one of its member states – the Order there had been suppressed under King Henry VIII of England during the dissolution of the monasteries – upon the succession of the Protestant queen Elizabeth I of England aptly demonstrates the new religious tolerance within the Order. For a time, the Order even possessed a German langue which was part Protestant or Evangelical and part Roman Catholic.

The moral decline that the knights underwent over the course of this period is best highlighted by the decision of many knights to serve in foreign navies and become "the mercenary sea-dogs of the 14th to 17th centuries", with the French Navy proving the most popular destination. This decision went against the knights' cardinal reason for existence, in that by serving a European power directly they faced the very real possibility that they would be fighting against another Roman Catholic force, as in the few Franco-Spanish naval skirmishes that occurred in this period. The biggest paradox is the fact that for many years the Kingdom of France remained on amicable terms with the Ottoman Empire, the Knights' greatest and bitterest foe and purported sole purpose for existence. Paris signed many trade agreements with the Ottomans and agreed to an informal (and ultimately ineffective) cease-fire between the two states during this period. That the Knights associated themselves with the allies of their sworn enemies shows their moral ambivalence and the new commercial-minded nature of the Mediterranean in the 17th century. Serving in a foreign navy, in particular that of the French, gave the knights the chance to serve the Church and for many, their king, to increase their chances of promotion in either their adopted navy or in Malta, to receive far better pay, to stave off their boredom with frequent cruises, to embark on the highly preferable short cruises of the French navy over the long caravans preferred by the Maltese, and if the knight desired, to indulge in some of the pleasures of a traditional debauched seaport. In return, the French gained and quickly assembled an experienced navy to stave off the threat of Habsburgian Spain. The shift in attitudes of the Knights over this period is ably outlined by Paul Lacroix, who states:

Inflated with wealth, laden with privileges which gave them almost sovereign powers ... the order at last became so demoralised by luxury and idleness that it forgot the aim for which it was founded, and gave itself up for the love of gain and thirst for pleasure. Its covetousness and pride soon became boundless. The Knights pretended that they were above the reach of crowned heads: they seized and pillaged without concern of the property of both infidels and Christians."

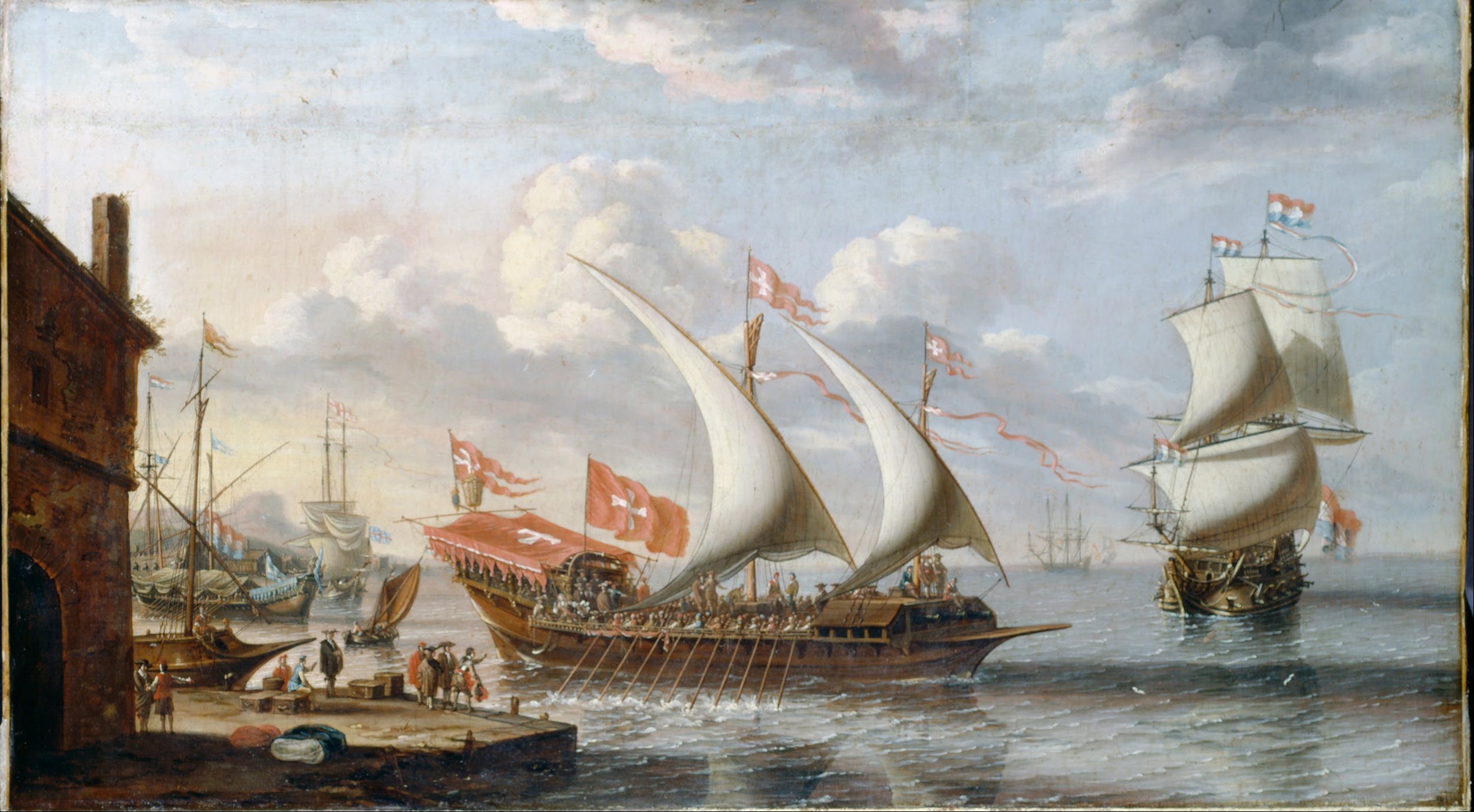
Hospitaller galley c. 1680

With the knights' exploits growing in fame and wealth, the European states became more complacent about the Order, and more unwilling to grant money to an institution that was perceived to be earning a healthy sum on the high seas. Thus, a vicious circle occurred, increasing the raids and reducing the grants received from the nation-states of Christendom to such an extent that the balance of payments on the island had become dependent on conquest. The European powers lost interest in the knights as they focused their intentions largely on one another during the Thirty Years' War. In February 1641 a letter was sent from an unknown dignitary in the Maltese capital of Valletta to the knights' most trustworthy ally and benefactor, Louis XIV of France, stating the Order's troubles:

Italy provides us with nothing much; Bohemia and Germany hardly anything, and England and the Netherlands for a long time now nothing at all. We only have something to keep us going, Sire, in your own Kingdom and in Spain.

Maltese authorities did not mention the fact that they were making a substantial profit policing the seas and seizing infidel ships and cargoes. The authorities on Malta immediately recognised the importance of corsairing to their economy and set about encouraging it, as despite their vows of poverty, the Knights were granted the ability to keep a portion of the spoglio, which was the prize money and cargo gained from a captured ship, along with the ability to fit out their own galleys with their new wealth.

The great controversy that surrounded the knights' Corso was their insistence on their policy of 'vista'. This enabled the Order to stop and board all shipping suspected of carrying Turkish goods and confiscate the cargo to be re-sold at Valletta, along with the ship's crew, who were by far the most valuable commodity on the ship. Naturally, many nations claimed to be victims of the knights' over-eagerness to stop and confiscate any goods remotely connected to the Turks. In an effort to regulate the growing problem, the authorities in Malta established a judicial court, the Consiglio del Mer, where captains who felt wronged could plead their case, often successfully. The practice of issuing privateering licenses and thus state endorsement, which had been in existence for a number of years, was tightly regulated as the island's government attempted to haul in the unscrupulous knights and appease the European powers and limited benefactors. Yet these efforts were not altogether successful, as the Consiglio del Mer received numerous complaints around the year 1700 of Maltese piracy in the region. Ultimately, the rampant over-indulgence in privateering in the Mediterranean was to be the knights' downfall in this particular period of their existence as they transformed from serving as the military outpost of a united Christendom to becoming another nation-state in a commercially oriented continent soon to be overtaken by the trading nations of the North Sea.

=== Turmoil in Europe ===
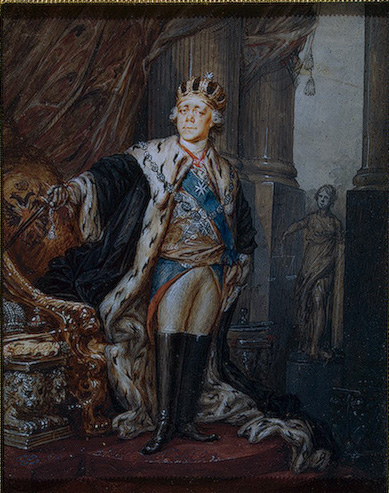
Emperor Paul wearing the Crown of the Grand Master of the Order of Malta (1799).

Even as it survived in Malta, the Order lost many of its European holdings during the Reformation. The property of the English branch was confiscated in 1540. The German Bailiwick of Brandenburg became Lutheran in 1577, then more broadly Evangelical, but continued to pay its financial contribution to the Order until 1812, when the Protector of the Order in Prussia, King Frederick William III, turned it into an order of merit; in 1852, his son and successor as Protector, King Frederick William IV, restored the Johanniterorden to its continuing place as the chief non-Roman Catholic branch of the Knights Hospitaller.

The Knights of Malta had a strong presence within the Imperial Russian Navy and the pre-revolutionary French Navy. When Phillippe de Longvilliers de Poincy was appointed governor of the French colony on Saint Kitts in 1639, he was a prominent Knight of St. John and dressed his retinue with the emblems of the Order. In 1651, the knights bought from the Compagnie des Îles de l'Amérique the islands of Sainte-Christophe, Saint Martin, and Saint Barthélemy. The Order's presence in the Caribbean was eclipsed with De Poincy's death in 1660. He had also bought the island of Saint Croix as his personal estate and deeded it to the Knights of St. John. In 1665, the order sold their Caribbean possessions to the French West India Company, ending the Order's presence in that region.

The decree of the French National Assembly in 1789 abolishing feudalism in France also abolished the Order in France:

V. Tithes of every description, as well as the dues which have been substituted for them, under whatever denomination they are known or collected (even when compounded for), possessed by secular or regular congregations, by holders of benefices, members of corporations (including the Order of Malta and other religious and military orders), as well as those devoted to the maintenance of churches, those impropriated to lay persons and those substituted for the portion congrue, are abolished ...

The French Revolutionary Government seized the assets and properties of the Order in France in 1792.

=== Loss of Malta and decline ===
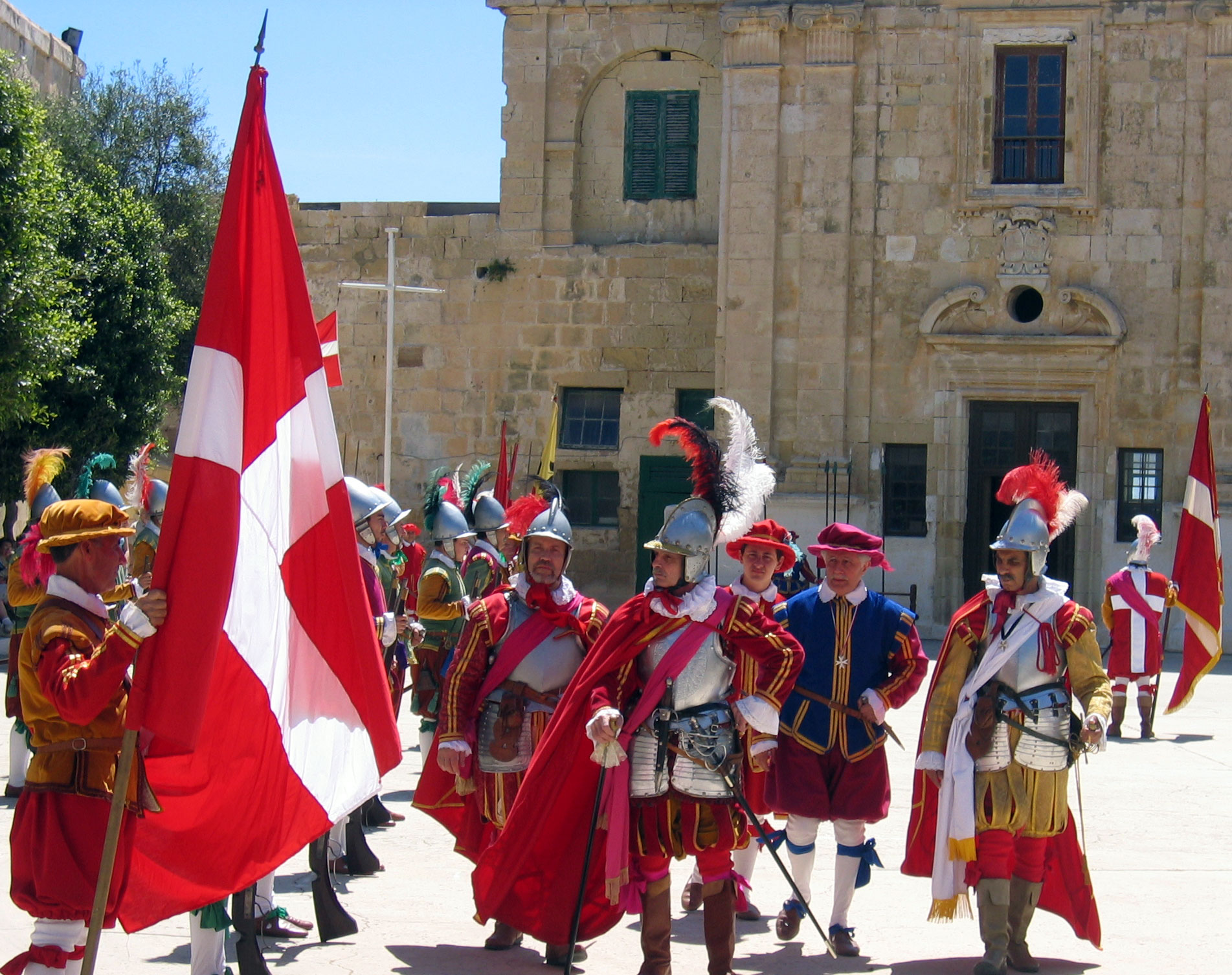
Re-enactment of 16th-century military drills conducted by the Knights at Fort Saint Elmo, 8 May 2005

In June 1798, a French fleet under Napoleon invaded and occupied Malta. Upon arriving off Malta on 9 June, Napoleon demanded from Grand Master Ferdinand von Hompesch zu Bolheim that his ships be allowed to enter the port and to take on water and supplies. The Grand Master replied that only two foreign ships could be allowed to enter the port at a time. In response, Napoleon ordered an invasion of Malta. On 10 June, French troops disembarked in Malta at seven points on the morning of 11 June and attacked. After several hours of fierce fighting, the Maltese forces in the west were forced to surrender. Napoleon opened negotiations with the fortress capital of Valletta on 11 June. Faced with vastly superior French forces and the loss of western Malta, the Grand Master negotiated a surrender to the invasion on 12 June. Hompesch left Malta for Trieste on 18 June. He resigned as Grand Master on 6 July 1799.

The knights were dispersed, though the order continued to exist in a diminished form and negotiated with European governments for a return to power. The Russian Emperor, Paul I, gave the largest number of knights shelter in Saint Petersburg, an action which gave rise to the Russian tradition of the Knights Hospitaller and the Order's recognition among the Russian Imperial Orders. The refugee knights in Saint Petersburg proceeded to elect Tsar Paul as their Grand Master – a rival to Grand Master von Hompesch until the latter's abdication left Paul as the sole Grand Master. Grand Master Paul I created, in addition to the Roman Catholic Grand Priory, a "Russian Grand Priory" of no fewer than 118 Commanderies, dwarfing the rest of the Order and open to all Christians. Paul's election as Grand Master was never ratified under Roman Catholic canon law, and he was the de facto rather than de jure Grand Master of the Order.

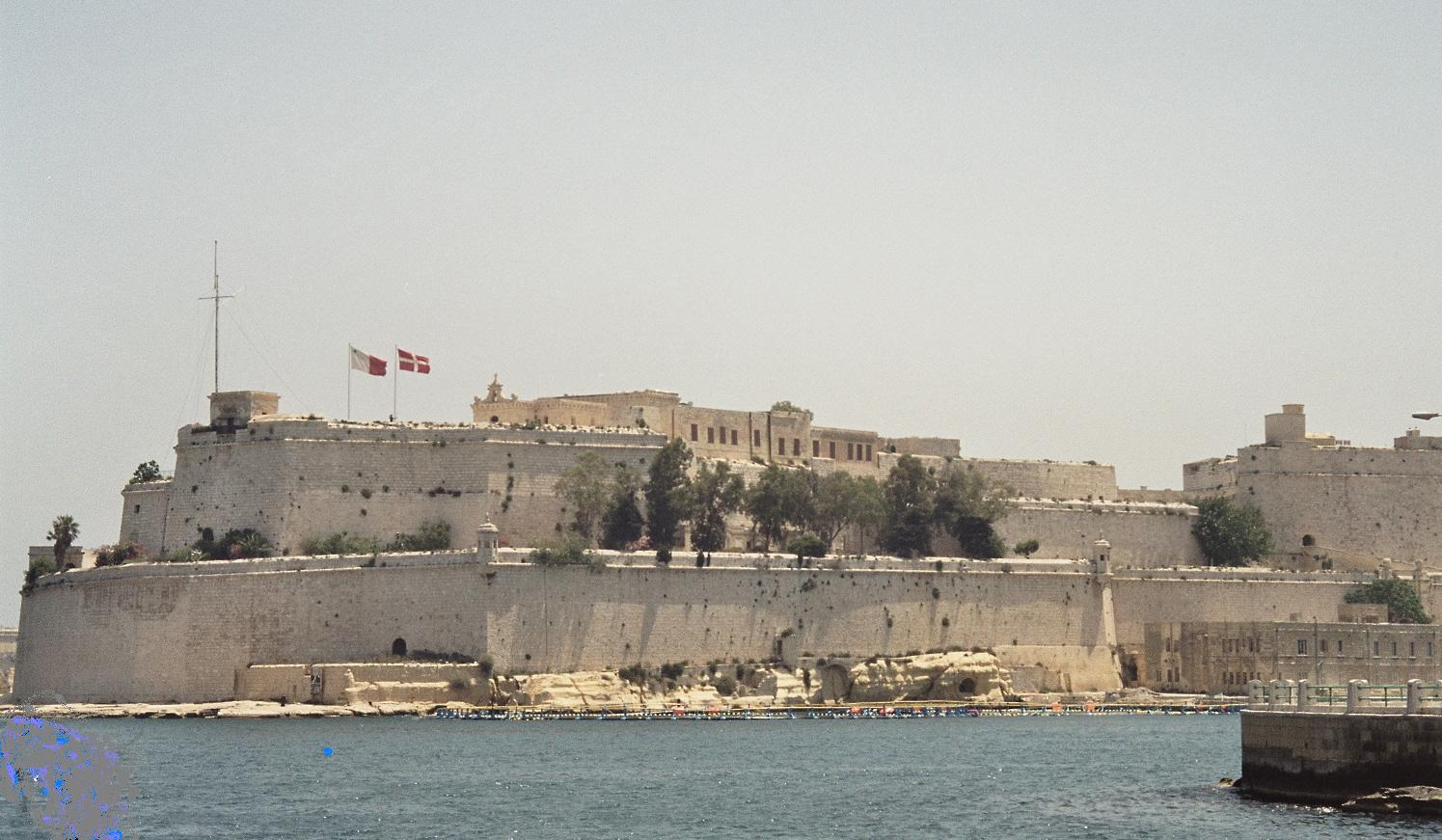
View from Valletta, Malta, showing Fort Saint Angelo, belonging to the Sovereign Military Order of Malta.

By the early 19th century, the order had been severely weakened by the loss of its priories throughout Europe. Only 10% of the order's income came from traditional sources in Europe, with the remaining 90% being generated by the Russian Grand Priory until 1810. This was partly reflected in the government of the Order being under Lieutenants, rather than Grand Masters, in the period 1805 to 1879, when Pope Leo XIII restored a Grand Master to the order. This signalled the renewal of the order's fortunes as a humanitarian and religious organization.

The 150,000 square feet (14,000 m^{2}) Hospital of Saint John, built between 1099 and 1291, was rediscovered in the Christian Quarter of the Old City of Jerusalem. From 2000 to 2013, it was excavated by the Israel Antiquities Authority. It had been able to accommodate up to 2,000 patients, who came from all religious groups, and Jewish patients received kosher food. It also served as an orphanage, with these children often becoming Hospitallers when adults. The remaining vaulted area was discovered during excavations for a restaurant, and the preserved building will be incorporated in the project.

== Successors of the Knights Hospitaller ==
The entities generally considered to maintain historical continuity with the Knights are the Sovereign Military Order of Malta, based in Rome and recognized by over 100 countries worldwide, as well as the chivalric orders in the Alliance of the Orders of Saint John of Jerusalem: the Bailiwick of Brandenburg of the Chivalric Order of Saint John of the hospital at Jerusalem, Johanniter Orde in Nederland, Order of Saint John in Sweden, and the Most Venerable Order of the Hospital of St. John of Jerusalem. (Note: The Canadian historian Christopher McCreery commented in 2008: "there are only five legitimate and mutually recognized Orders of St. John that continue to carry on the historic work of the Knights Hospitaller. These are the Sovereign Military and Hospitaller Order of St. John of Jerusalem of Rhodes and of Malta (The Order of Malta), Die Balley Brandenburg des Ritterlichen Ordens Sankt Johannis vom Spital zu Jerusalem, commonly known as the Johanniter Orden (Germany), Johanniter Orde in Nederland (Netherland), Johanniterorden i Sverige (Sweden), and the Most Venerable Order of the Hospital of St. John of Jerusalem (Order of St. John, sometimes referred to as the Most Venerable Order). In 1961 an alliance was formed between the Most Venerable Order, the Johanniter Orden, Johanniter Orde in Nederland, and Johanniterorden i Sverige; these four orders compromise the Alliance of the Orders of St. John".)

=== Sovereign Military Order of Malta ===
In 1834, the order settled in Rome. Hospital work, the original work of the order, became once again its main concern. The Order's hospital and welfare activities, undertaken on a considerable scale in World War I, were greatly intensified and expanded in World War II under the Grand Master Fra' Ludovico Chigi Albani della Rovere (Grand Master 1931–1951).

Coat of arms of the Sovereign Military Order of Malta

The Sovereign Military Hospitaller Order of Saint John of Jerusalem, of Rhodes and of Malta, better known as the Sovereign Military Order of Malta (SMOM), is a Roman Catholic lay religious order and the world's oldest surviving order of chivalry. Its sovereign status is recognised by membership in numerous international bodies and observer status at the United Nations and others. Of all the orders affiliated with Saint John, i.e., members of the Alliance of the Orders of St John, the Sovereign Military Order of Malta is the most senior since it possesses the ability to trace its history and line of Prince and Grand Masters directly back to the Knights Hospitaller.

The Order maintains diplomatic relations with 112 countries, official relations with 6 others and with the European Union, permanent observer missions to the United Nations and its specialised agencies, and delegations or representations to many other international organizations. It issues its own passports, currency, stamps and even vehicle registration plates. The Sovereign Military Order of Malta has a permanent presence in 120 countries, with 12 Grand Priories and Sub-Priories and 48 national Associations, as well as numerous hospitals, medical centres, daycare centres, first aid corps, and specialist foundations, which operate in 120 countries. Its 13,500 members and 95,000 volunteers and over 52,000 medical personnel – doctors, nurses and paramedics – are dedicated to the care of the poor, the sick, the elderly, the disabled, the homeless, terminal patients, lepers, and all those who suffer. The Order is especially involved in helping victims of armed conflicts and natural disasters by providing medical assistance, caring for refugees, and distributing medicines and basic equipment for survival.

The Sovereign Military Order of Malta established a mission in Malta, after signing an agreement with the Maltese Government which granted the Order the exclusive use of Fort St. Angelo for a term of 99 years. Today, after restoration, the Fort hosts historical and cultural activities related to the Order of Malta.

=== Order of Saint John (Bailiwick of Brandenburg) ===
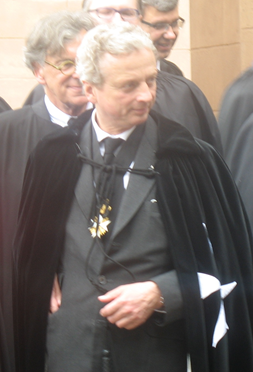
Prince Oskar of Prussia, Bailiwick of Brandenburg of the Chivalric Order of Saint John of the hospital at Jerusalem Herrenmeister since 1999

During the Reformation, German commanderies of the Bailiwick of Brandenburg (located chiefly in the Margraviate of Brandenburg) declared their continued adherence to the Order of Saint John even as their knights converted to evangelical Christianity. Continuing to the present day as the Order of Saint John of the Bailiwick of Brandenburg, this forms an order of chivalry under the protection of the Federal Republic and with its Herrenmeister ("Lord of the Knights") almost always a scion of the House of Hohenzollern (currently, Prince Oscar of Prussia). From Germany, this Protestant branch has spread by membership into other countries in Europe (including Belgium, Hungary, Poland, Finland, Denmark, Switzerland, France, Austria, the United Kingdom, and Italy), North America (the United States, Canada, and Mexico), South America (Colombia, Venezuela, Chile), Africa (Namibia, South Africa), Asia, and Australia.

The commanderies of the Bailiwick of Brandenburg in the Netherlands (which originated in the Middle Ages) and Sweden became independent of the Bailiwick after the Second World War and now are independent orders under the protection of their respective monarchs; King Willem-Alexander of the Netherlands is an Honorary Commander of the Order of Saint John in the Netherlands, and the Order of St John in Sweden is protected by King Carl XVI Gustaf of Sweden.

All three Protestant orders, the German, Dutch, and Swedish, are in formalised co-operation as members of the Alliance of the Orders of Saint John of Jerusalem, founded in 1961 by the Order of Saint John of the Bailiwick of Brandenburg. (As well as originating with the mediaeval Knights Hospitaller, these three orders meet the traditional conditions for dynastic orders of chivalry under the legitimate fount of honour of each nation, and thus enjoy recognition by the privately operated and funded International Commission on Orders of Chivalry as of 2016.) The Protestant orders remain independent of, though cooperative with, the Roman Catholic Sovereign Military Order of Malta.

=== Most Venerable Order of Saint John ===
In England, almost all the property of the Knights Hospitaller was confiscated by Henry VIII during the dissolution of the monasteries of the English Reformation. Though not formally suppressed, this effectively caused the activities of the English Langue of the order to come to an end.

In 1831, a British order was irregularly recreated by European aristocrats claiming to be acting on behalf of the Sovereign Military Order of Malta. This order in time became known as the Most Venerable Order of Saint John, receiving a royal charter from Queen Victoria in 1888, before expanding throughout the British Empire and United States. Today, the best-known activities of this order are the St John Ambulance Brigade in Britain and the Commonwealth and the Saint John Eye Hospital in Jerusalem. The Most Venerable Order of Saint John has maintained a presence in Malta since the late 19th century. In contrast with the orders originating with the medieval Knights Hospitaller, the British organisation no longer limits its membership to Christians.

=== Self-styled orders ===
Several other organizations claim with their own sources to have evolved from the Knights Hospitaller, but all are subject to international dispute and lack recognition. The Russian tradition of the Knights Hospitaller was recognized by the Pope with Tsar Paul I becoming Grand Master. The British resented this decision as it could have given Russia access to the Mediterranean through a claim over Malta. Britain said that the decision of the Pope was not official. The Holy See later retracted its decision stating a number of conflicts with Tsar Paul I, since he did not follow the precepts binding the Grand Master: he was married and not celibate; he had never been to Malta and declined to live there; and he was not a Roman Catholic. Several other orders have made claims over the Order of St John since the 19th century. Each order, including the Russian Tradition, generally uses its interpretation of sources to present and claim a particular history of events. No independent sources support any superseding order of the Knights Hospitaller, all of which use either non-primary or self-published, non-peer-reviewed sources in support of their claims of legitimacy. The Order came to an end either shortly after the 1798 expulsion of the knights from Malta, or soon after the Russian Revolution in the early 20th century.

The large passage fees collected by the American Association of SMOM in the early 1950s may well have tempted Charles Pichel to create his own "Sovereign Order of St John of Jerusalem, Knights Hospitaller" in 1956. Pichel avoided the problems of being an imitation of SMOM by giving his organization a mythical history, claiming that the American organisation he led had been founded within the Russian tradition of the Knights Hospitaller in 1908: a spurious claim, but which nevertheless misled many including some academics. In truth, the foundation of his organisation had no connection to the Russian tradition of the Knights Hospitaller. Once created, the attraction of Russian Nobles into membership of Pichel's 'Order' lent some plausibility to his claims.

These organisations have led to scores of other self-styled orders. Another self-styled Order, based in the US, gained a substantial following under the leadership of the late Robert Formhals, who for some years, and with the support of historical organisations such as The Augustan Society, claimed to be a Polish prince of the House of Sanguszko.

== Hierarchy ==
=== Headquarters ===
The first in the hierarchy of command was the Grand Master, or commander-in-chief, followed by the Grand Commander, who after 1304 came from the Grand Priory of St Gilles and who took the place of the Grand Master in case of his absence or death. The third-highest rank was that of the Marshal of the hospital, whose main duty was to prepare the order for war. This included the procurement of armour, weapons, mounts with all the required equine equipment, and artillery with all it entails (ordnance, powder, ammunitions). The Marshal could on occasion be given command by the Grand Master or the Grand Commander.

The headquarters of the Hospitallers was known as the convent, and its senior officials included, along with the Grand Master, the seneschal, who was the Order's second-in-command; the marshal, in charge of military affairs; the preceptor, who managed the administration and provisions; the hospitaller, who managed the main hospital of the Order; the prior, who was responsible for the church at the convent; the draper, in charge of uniforms; and the treasurer, responsible for finance. Later, from the 13th century, there were also the positions of turcopolier, who was in charge of local auxiliary forces known as turcopoles, and the admiral, who commanded the navy of the Order of Saint John.

=== Ranks ===
The earliest title used by Hospitallers was brother (frater in Latin), which they most likely used since the creation of the Hospital of Saint John in the late 11th century. They also were referred to as Hospitallers (hospitalarii) by the time of the First Crusade. A charter from King Baldwin I of Jerusalem dating to 1112 refers to the "poor brothers" of the hospital. Over the next century, members of the Order were organized between chaplains and lay-brothers, with the latter being those that took monastic vows of poverty, chastity, and obedience, and the brothers-at-arms eventually consisted of two ranks – knight brothers and sergeant brothers. The Rule of Raymond du Puy, which was confirmed in the 1140s, did not mention brothers-at-arms, but they were in the statues of the early 1180s. Thus the Order developed three main ranks, those of priest brothers, knight brothers, and sergeant brothers.

Knights were part of the Order of Saint John as brothers by the 1140s, but sergeants were not brothers initially, being hired as mercenaries by the Order to defend pilgrims. Sergeants were not codified as brothers of the Order until the statues of 1204, which listed both knight brothers and sergeant brothers. The statues formally acknowledged developments that had already taken place.

== See also ==
=== Personalities of the Hospital ===
- Caterina Vitale, the first female pharmacist of the Knights Hospitaller, and the first female pharmacist and chemist in Malta
- List of the priors of Saint John of Jerusalem in England
- Pierre Jean Louis Ovide Doublet, a leadership member of the French Secretariat of the Knights

=== Fortifications and locales of the Hospital ===
- List of Knights Hospitaller sites
- Fortifications of Malta
- Fortifications of Rhodes
- Kolossi Castle
- Mailberg
- Castle of La Muela
- Palace of the Grand Master of the Knights of Rhodes
- Torphichen Preceptory
- Krak des Chevaliers

=== Related topics ===
- History of the Knights Hospitaller in the Levant
- Knights Templar
- Teutonic Order
