= Attack on Antalya (1472) =

- Part of Ottoman–Venetian War (1463–1479)
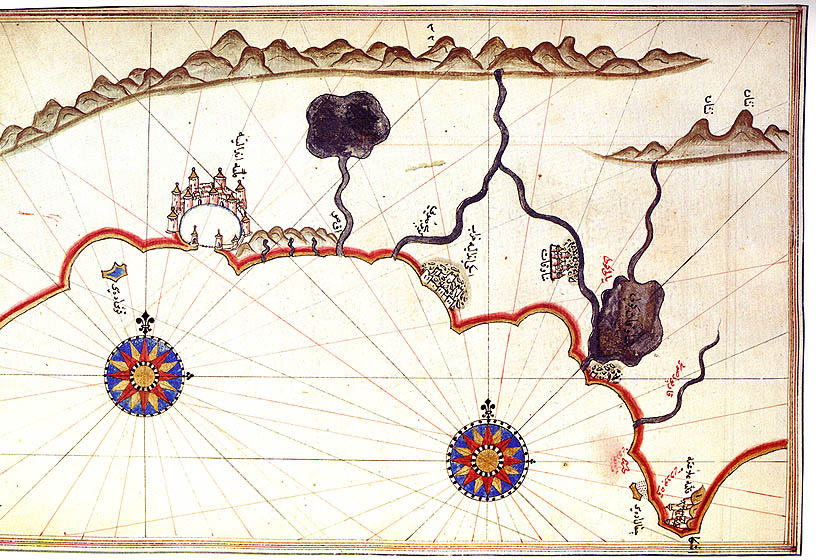
- Ottoman drawing of Antalya (on the left), in which the chains protecting the city can be seen.
Date	August 1472
Location	Antalya
Result	Ottoman victory

Belligerents
Republic of Venice; Papal States; Kingdom of Naples; Knights Hospitaller	Ottoman Empire

Commanders and leaders
Pietro Mocenigo; Vittore Soranzo; Stefano Malipiero (Papal States) Oliviero Carafa; Lignana	Unknown

Strength
8,000 men 87 ships 15 transport ships	Unknown

Casualties and losses
Unknown	Unknown

The Attack on Antalya was a military engagement in August 1472 between the attacking Christian forces and the Ottoman garrison of Antalya during Ottoman–Venetian War (1463–1479). The attack ended in failure.

== Background ==
During the years 1471–1472, Pope Sixtus IV spent more than 144,000 gold florins on a fleet which Cardinal Oliviero Carafa would lead on a crusade against the Ottomans. The Pope also formed accords between Venice and Naples that were to prepare their fleet against the Ottomans. On June 1472, Carafa sailed to Naples, then Rhodes, where the Christian fleet began assembling, bringing the total armada force to 87 and 15 transport ships, of which 17 were Neopolitan, 24 papal, 46 Venetian, and 15 support ships from the Knights Hospitaller, bringing the total force to 8,000 men. The Venetians were led by Pietro Mocenigo, and the Hospitallers by Lignana. The Christian armada set sail to attack Antalya to support Uzun Hasan who was fighting the Ottomans.

== Attack ==
In August, the Crusaders arrived in Antalya. They began forming a plan under which the Venetian general, Vittore Soranzo, would lead ten ships to enter Antalya's port. The other general, Stefano Malipiero, was to attack the city using land forces. Early in the morning, Soranzo's ten galleys, composed of three each from Venice, Papal, and Naples, and one from Rhodes, simultaneously attacked the chains protecting the harbor. The Crusaders then began plundering the market and burning the warehouses in the harbor.

The Crusaders' land forces then launched an attack on the city. However, having discovered that the ladders were too short to climb and the ropes and grappling hooks were inadequate, the Crusaders retreated under heavy arquebus fire. Another source mentions that the Crusaders managed to storm the first wall only to discover that there was a second wall protecting the city, which the Crusaders attempted to storm, but the Ottoman garrison defended themselves. The Crusaders lost the momentum of the attack and decided to retreat.

The Crusaders, lacking heavy artillery to breach the walls, had their war council decide it was futile to continue the attack. The next day the Crusaders retreated after laying waste to the suburbs.

== Sources ==
- Abercrombie, Gordon Ellyson (2024). The Hospitaller Knights of Saint John at Rhodes 1306-1522.
- Setton, Kenneth Meyer (1976). The Papacy and the Levant, 1204-1571, Volume 2.
- Hammer, Joseph von (1827). History of the Ottoman Empire largely from previously unused manuscripts and archives, Vol II (in German).
