= Battle of Hammamet =

Battle in the Spanish-Ottoman Wars

- Part of Spanish–Ottoman wars
Date	14 August 1605
Location	Hammamet, Tunisia
Result	Ottoman-Tunisian victory

Belligerents
Spanish Empire: Kingdom of Sicily; (Sovereign Military Order of Malta) Knights Hospitaller	Ottoman Empire: Tunisia

Commanders and leaders
(Spanish Empire) Juan de Padilla Manrique y Acuña †	Unknown

Strength
1,200–1,400 men 10 ships Sicily: 6-7 ships; Maltese: 3-4 ships	Unknown

Casualties and losses
500–1,000 killed	Unknown

The Battle of Hammamet was an attack by the Spanish-Sicilian-Maltese fleet on the Tunisian town Hammamet, the campaign ended in a fiasco and massacre for the allied troops.

== Battle ==
In 1605, a fleet of 10 ships consisting of 6 or 7 Sicilian ships, 3 or 4 Maltese ships and 1,200 or 1,400 men, the aim was to attack the city of Hammamet, The allied forces was led by the Spanish commander Juan de Padilla Manrique y Acuña, Adelantado of Castile, they landed on 14 August and the Allied troops quickly captured the city, slaying its entire garrison and capturing a few women, according to Alonso de Contreras. A trumpet sound was heard, which prompted a retreat. Since no one knew who ordered the retreat, the allied troops withdrew back to their ships, with the whole army on the beach ahead. Seeing this, the Tunisians attacked them. On top of this, a storm wrecked the ships, making the escape impossible, and the allied troops were surrounded and massacred. The Adelantado tried to swim but was killed. in the ensuing massacre, 500 or 1,000 were killed in the expedition.
