= Battle of Hama (1230) =

1230 conflict between the Ayyubids and Crusaders

- Part of Crusades
Date	August 1230
Location	Hama
Result	Ayyubid victory

Belligerents
(Sovereign Military Order of Malta) Knights Hospitaller; Knights Templar	Ayyubid Dynasty

Commanders and leaders
Bertrand de Thessy	Al-Muzaffar II Mahmud; Taqi al-Din at Afyon

Strength
500 knights 2,700 infantry	Unknown

Casualties and losses
Heavy	Unknown

The Battle of Hama was a military engagement between a joint Hospitaller-Templar force and the Ayyubids of Hama. The Crusader army marched towards Hama but were ambushed and suffered heavy losses.

== Background ==
After the end of the Sixth Crusade, the Holy Roman Emperor Frederick II signed the Treaty of Jaffa in 1229 with the Ayyubid Sultan Al-Kamil. The principality of Antioch and the County of Tripoli, and, in particular, the possessions of the Hospitallers and the Templars in those regions, had not been included in the peace of Jaffa. The Hospitallers took advantage of this, in the autumn of 1229, to plunder the town and district of Ba'rin, the former Montferrand, capturing a band of Turcomans encamped in the vicinity. The Ayyubid emir of Hama, Al-Muzaffar II Mahmud, had undertaken to pay a tribute to the Hospitaller knights. But, as he then failed to make this payment, the Hospitallers marched against him.

== Battle ==
On August 1230, the Hospitallers marched from their fortress, Krak des Chevaliers, towards Hama. The Templars of Tortosa joined forces with the Hospitallers, and together the Crusader army totalled 500 knights and 2,700 infantry. The Muslims in Hama learned of their approach and began setting up an ambush. The Ayyubids were led by Taqi al-Din at Afyon, or rather Afnun. The Crusaders marched unknowingly to the trap only to suffer heavy losses between killed and captured. Few of the knights managed to survive the onslaught. The victors, the Ayyubids, carried the prisoners back to Hama.

== Aftermath ==
For three years, the Ayyubids in Hama ceased paying tribute to the Crusaders. In 1233, the Crusaders launched another raid against Hama. Gathering 100 knights, 400 mounted sergeants, and 1,500 infantry. This large force managed to capture and sack Baarin. However, this raid has resulted only in insignificant outcomes. Due to the fact that the Crusaders wanted to avoid provoking, for a mere question of unpaid arrears.

The Ayyubids were going back north for a war between Muslims. Sultan al-Kāmil, who had come specially from Egypt, had summoned the Ayyubid princes to go and defend the city of Khilāt, in Greater Armenia, against the attacks of the Seljuk sultan of Konya. Al-Kāmil wished both to have his hands free against the Seljuks and to maintain peace with Frederick II. Instead of punishing the Hospitallers, he induced his nephew, the emir of Hamā, to pay voluntarily to the Knights the tribute demanded.

== Sources ==
- Christopher Marshall (1994), Warfare in the Latin East, 1192-1291.
- John J. Robinson (1992), Dungeon, Fire and Sword. The Knights Templar in the Crusades.
- René Grousset (1934), The History of the Crusades and the Frankish Kingdom of Jerusalem, Vol III. The Muslim Monarchy and Frankish Anarchy.
