= Battle of the Orontes (1265) =

Battle in the later Crusades

- Part of Crusades
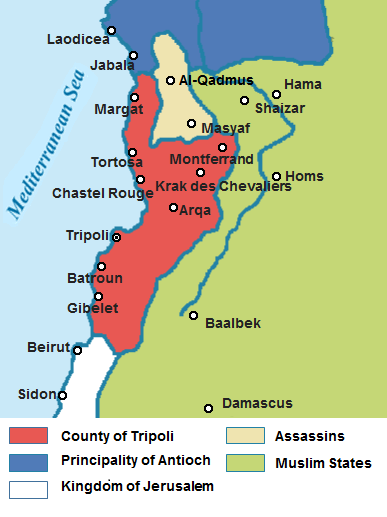
- Map of County of Tripoli
Date	19 November 1265
Location	Orontes River near Homs.
Result	Mamluk victory

Belligerents
County of Tripoli; Knights Templar; Knights Hospitaller	Mamluk Sultanate

Commanders and leaders
Bohemond VI of Antioch	'Alam al-Din Sanjar al-Bashqirdi

Casualties and losses
Heavy	Unknown

The Battle of the Orontes was a military engagement between the Crusaders and the Mamluks in the Orontes River near Homs. The Mamluks defeated the Crusader force and forced it to retreat.

== Background ==
In early 1265, the Mamluk Sultan Baybars launched his campaign against the Crusader states. He first managed to capture Caesarea Marittima, then he moved to capture the fortress of Arsuf, and lastly, Haifa. The loss of these fortresses created a profound shock to the crusaders. The Latin kingdom borders were shrunk. Hearing the news of the Mamluk invasion, the king of Cyprus, Hugh III, arrived with reinforcements to Acre to help the Crusaders. Baybars noticed the situation and decided to conclude his campaign on May 11, returning to Cairo. After the return of the Sultan, the prince of Antioch and Tripoli, Bohemond VI, decided to take military action against the Muslims.

== Battle ==
In November of the same year, Bohemond assembled his troops in Tripoli. The military orders of Templars and Hospitallers joined forces with Bohemond in his campaign. The Crusaders set their eyes on the city of Homs and began marching. The Mamluk governor of Homs, 'Alam al-Din Sanjar al-Bashqirdi, learned of the Crusader approach and began sending scouts to watch over the crossing fords in the Orontes River. Certain that they would cross the river at Balala, he marched there to intercept them. When the Crusaders saw the ford was being guarded, they moved, looking for another crossing. The Mamluks crossed the ford on November 19 and attacked the Crusaders from behind. The Crusaders were defeated and forced to retreat to Tripoli. The Mamluks chased them, killing and capturing many of them, until they entered the territory of Tripoli.

== Sources ==
- Peter Thorau (1993), The Lion of Egypt: Sultan Baybars I and the Near East in the thirteenth century.
- Jaroslav Folda (2005), Crusader art in the Holy Land : from the Third Crusade to the fall of Acre, 1187–1291.
- Samuel James Wilson (2016), The Latin Principality of Antioch and Its Relationship with the Armenian Kingdom of Cilicia, 1188–1268.
