= Attack on Sousse (1537) =

- Part of the Ottoman–Habsburg wars
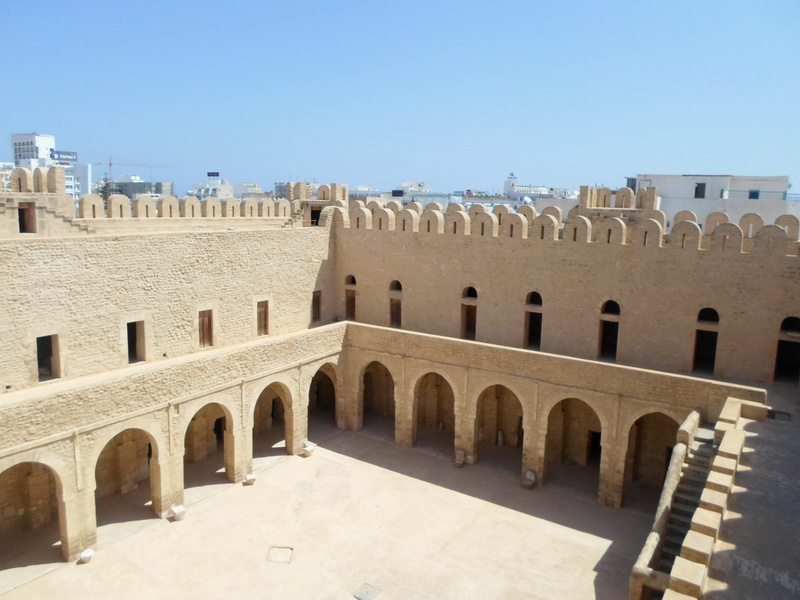
- The Ribat of Sousse, which the Christian forces attacked but failed to capture.
Date	April 1537
Location	Sousse
Result	Ottoman victory

Belligerents
Spanish Empire: Kingdom of Sicily; (Sovereign Military Order of Malta) Knights Hospitaller	Ottoman Empire: Regency of Tunis

Commanders and leaders
(Spanish Empire) Giovanni de'Aragona Tagliavia (Spanish Empire) Diego de Castilla † (Sovereign Military Order of Malta) Paolo Simeoni (Sovereign Military Order of Malta) Galatian de Sese	Unknown

Strength
14 Galleys +3,150 men: 3,000 Spanish; 150 Maltese knights; Number of Maltese soldiers	Unknown

Casualties and losses
Heavy	Unknown

The Attack on Sousse was a military expedition by a joint Spanish-Maltese fleet against the Ottoman-held town of Sousse. The attack ended in failure, and they retreated after heavy losses.

== Background ==
The Maltese commander Paolo Simeoni was appointed as the commander of Maltese galleys. Shortly after his appointment, an envoy from the Hafsid Sultan, Abu Abdallah Muhammad V al-Hasan, arrived in Malta and asked the Knights Hospitallers for help, complaining that the Ottomans had captured the town of Sousse and other places. An ambassador from Malta reported this to Emperor Charles V, who was outraged to see his vassal being attacked. The Emperor immediately dispatched for help. The Maltese admiral transported the Hafsid envoy to Sicily. There the Sicilian viceroy sent 10 Spanish-Sicilian ships and 4 from Malta. The Spanish-Maltese fleet was led by the Maltese admiral, but the land forces were led by Giovanni de'Aragona Tagliavia, Marquis of Terranova.

== Attack ==
In April of 1537, the Christian fleet departed. The Christian forces consisted of 3,000 Spanish infantry and 150 Hospitaller knights alongside a number of Maltese infantry. The Christians landed 80 miles south of Cape Bon. The fort of Sousse was garrisoned by Ottoman Turks, Tunisian Moors, and Corsair renegades. The Sousse fort was protected by a tower, or Ribat which can be seen today. The Christians took position north of the city to avoid artillery fire from the fort. There they were joined by the Hafsid Sultan himself and began bombarding the fort.

A breach was made in the walls; however, a renegade deserted from the fort and went to the Marquis, reverting himself to Christianity. The renegade convinced the marquis to direct his artillery to bombard a section of the walls, which proved to be the strongest of all. They began bombarding until the gunpowder ran out. A narrow breach has been made. 130 Maltese Knights and 400 Spanish soldiers assaulted the walls. The Christians were caught in heavy fire from the wall bastion and retreated with heavy losses. Among those who were killed was Diego de Castilla, who led the assault.

Another assault has been made. This time 30 Maltese knights and other soldiers were led by Galatian de Sese. Sese personally led the charge and even killed an Ottoman captain with his sword during the breach. However, once the attackers entered the fort, the defenders fell back into a fortified tower. The tower was extremely strong since it couldn't be captured without heavy artillery, and the defenders poured down arquebus fire on the attackers, inflicting heavy losses, including two important Hospitallers: Don Bernardo de Guimeran and Antonio Maldonado, who were wounded.

The Hafsid Sultan was dismayed with the results, and a Spanish ship arrived, informing the Marquis to abandon the attack for an upcoming holy league against the Ottomans. The renegade who fooled the marquis managed to escape to the fort. The expedition returned to Malta. The knights were in sorrow for the loss of their men and frustrated with the marquis who led them.

== Sources ==
- Alexander Sutherland (1831), The Achievements Of The Knights Of Malta, Vol II.
- Gordon Ellyson Abercrombie (2024), The Hospitaller Knights of Saint John, 1523-1565.
- Claude Petiet (1996), The Order of Malta and the Turks: Politics and Strategy in the Mediterranean in the 16th Century (In French).
