= Action of 15 February 1700 =

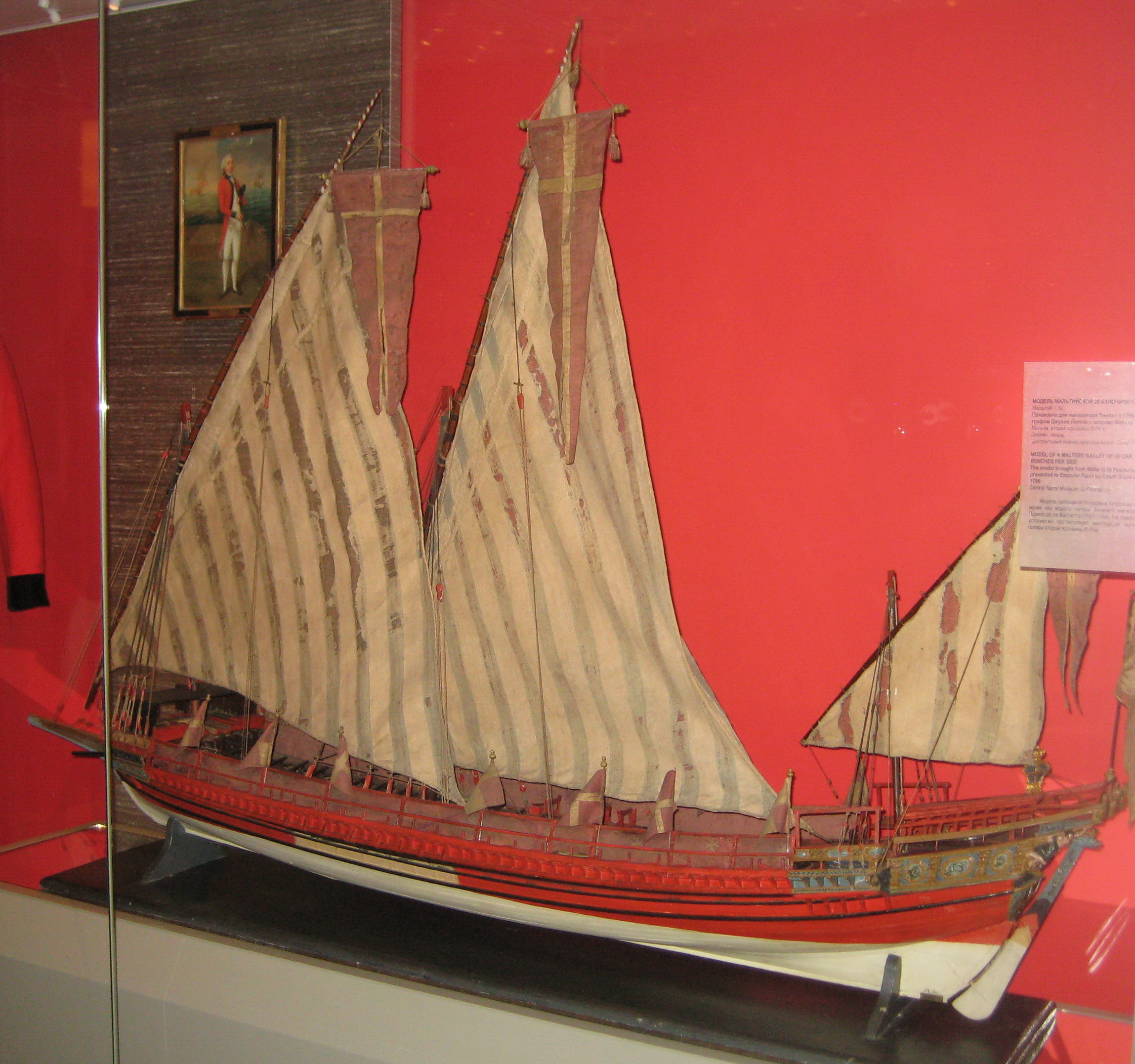
- Maltese galley
Date	15 February 1700
Location	Correnti island, Sicily
Result	Tunisian victory

Belligerents
(Sovereign Military Order of Malta) Order of Saint John	Ottoman Tunis

Commanders and leaders
(Sovereign Military Order of Malta) Bailly Spinola	Unknown

Strength
1 ship 700 men	1 ship

Casualties and losses
1 ship destroyed 522 killed	Unknown

The Action of 15 February 1700 was a naval engagement between the Maltese and the Tunisian galleys. The Maltese galley encountered a Tunisian ship. The engagement ended in disaster for the Maltese as their ship crashed after a collision, destroying the ship and killing the majority of its crew.

== Battle ==
On February 15, 1700, a squadron of 7 Maltese galleys was cruising off the eastern coast of Sicily close to the Correnti island. Bailly Spinola led the squadron. During their patrol, they sighted two Tunisian ships sailing south. Without wasting time, the flagship, Capitana, quickly sailed towards one of the ships using the strong winds. The Maltese determined to board the Tunisian ship. A bloody fight ensued, during which Spinola's brother received a mortal wound. His servant attempted to help him get up but was killed by a musket shot.

The Maltese were almost at their success; however, a dangerous circumstance occurred. The Tunisian ship was on the point of being struck and ran foul of the Capitana. This violent collision damaged the Maltese galley bow badly, and the winds from the south ended in a violent storm, which dispersed them alongside the Maltese squadron. The Maltese ship St. Paul, led by De Javon, immediately arrived to help the shipwreck survivors. They were able to save the survivors they could, including Spinola. The St. Paul remained in the same place, hoping to save more, but a violent storm threw them away from the spot.

== Aftermath ==
The Capitana fiasco ended in the death of 22 knights and 500 men, including soldiers, officers, and slaves. The news of this disaster reached the Grand Master, which deeply affected him, and he lamented to see the Barbary corsairs' success against Christian shipping.

== Sources ==
- John Campbell (1781), A Universal History, From the Earliest Accounts to the Present Time, Vol. 33.
- Pierre-Marie-Louis de Boisgelin de Kerdu (1805), Ancient and modern Malta, as also, the history of the knights of St. John of Jerusalem, Vol 2.
- Claire Eliane Engel (1963), Knights of Malta, A Gallery of Portraits.
- Ayse Devrim Atauz (2008), Eight Thousand Years of Maltese Maritime History: Trade, Piracy, and Naval Warfare in the Central Mediterranean.
- Anton Quintano (2003), The Maltese-Hospitaller Sailing Ship Squadron, 1701-1798.
