= Attack on Modon (1531) =

- Part of the Ottoman–Habsburg wars
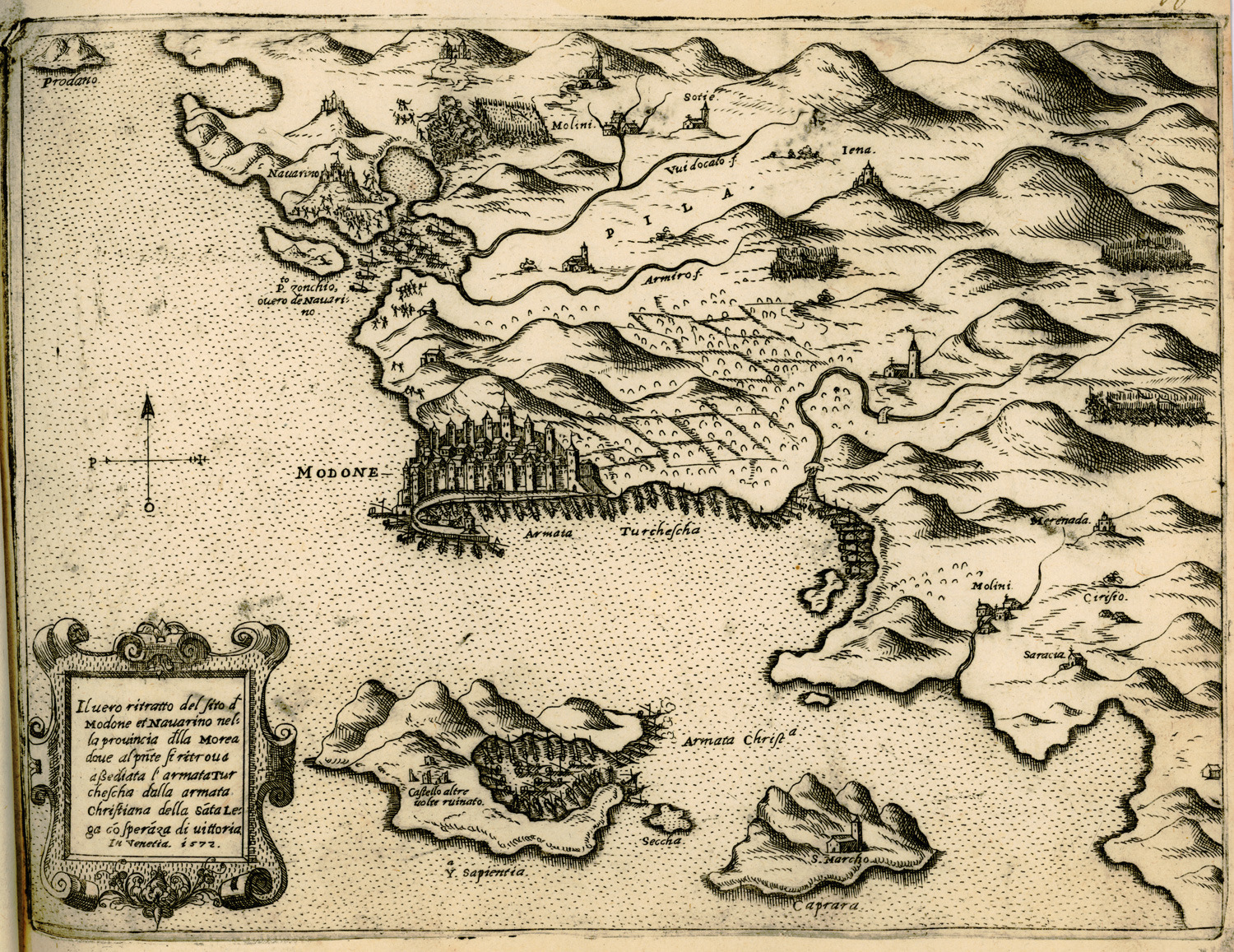
- Map of Methoni, where the island Sapientza can be seen in front of the city, which the knights took as a cover for their attack.
Date	1 September 1531
Location	Methoni, Messenia, Peloponnese, Greece
Result	Ottoman victory

Belligerents
(Sovereign Military Order of Malta) Knights Hospitaller	Ottoman Empire

Commanders and leaders
(Sovereign Military Order of Malta) Bernardo Salviati	(Ottoman Empire) Unknown

Strength
300 men 8 Galleys	Unknown; Relief force: 6,000 men

Casualties and losses
Unknown	800 Inhabitants enslaved

The Attack on Modon was a military expedition by the Knights Hospitallers to capture the city of Modon held by the Ottomans. Initially, the knights managed to capture the city, but the citadel held out, and an Ottoman relief force arrived, forcing the knights to retreat.

== Prelude ==
After the tragic loss of Rhodes, the Knights Hospitallers and their leader Philippe Villiers de L'Isle-Adam lamented their loss and began making plans to establish a new base for the order. The knights made plans to attack and capture Modon in Morea. The Knights dispatched a flotilla of 8 galleys under the prior of Rome, Bernardo Salviati, on August 17, 1531. The Knights establish contact with a young Greek man called Scandali, who was the son of a Christian renegade. The Knights sailed and arrived at the island of Sapientza on August 31. The island covers the harbor of Modon. Scandali and other renegades came to the commander and spoke confidently about the plan’s chances; Salviati wanted more proof than just their word.

To verify the renegades claims, three Hospitaller knights, also in disguise, were sent with them back into the city. Scandali was in charge of a tower built on a mole (a jetty or breakwater) guarding the harbor. He secretly brought the knights into the tower and showed them how it could be taken. The disguised knights returned to the fleet and gave a favorable report, confirming that the attack was feasible.

== Attack ==
The next day, the Knights dispatched two ships loaded with timber wood and hidden soldiers. The two ships arrived at Modon's harbor. Another renegade, Calojan, who was the port superintendent, ensured that the boats entered the harbor unchallenged. Scandali went to the tower and managed to intoxicate the janissary guards there. While intoxicated, several Janissaries were killed, and the tower was seized by the Knights without raising any alarm. The Knights informed Salviati and immediately sent reinforcements. They killed the guards and opened the gates for the knights. The knights, numbered 300, attacked and captured the city.

The Ottoman garrison retreated to the castle, and the knights, instead of working to capture the castle, engaged in looting the city. The Ottoman governor, learning that the attackers were only around 300 men, quickly organized a counterattack with all available troops. He also sent messengers to bring reinforcements from nearby Ottoman positions. A fierce battle ensued. During this, Salviati was unaware of what was happening until alerted by Scandali. The commander quickly arrived and pushed the Ottoman sally to the citadel.

Now the knights were prepared to bombard the castle; however, a relief force of 6,000 men arrived to help the Ottoman garrison. The garrison quickly made another sortie against the knights. With all of this combined, Salviati ordered a retreat. The knights abandoned the plundering and retreated. The knights had captured 800 inhabitants of the town, mostly women and children.

== Aftermath ==
The failure of the expedition ended the knights hope to return to Rhodes. The Grandmaster was finally convinced to relocate his base to Malta and work to improve the island as their base.

== Sources ==
- Alexander Sutherland (1831), The Achievements Of The Knights Of Malta, Vol II.
- Whitworth Porter (1858), A History of the Knights of Malta, or The Order of the Hospital of St. John of Jerusalem.
- Gordon Ellyson Abercrombie (2024), The Hospitaller Knights of Saint John, 1523-1565.
