= Battle of al-Ruways =

1266 battle of the Crusades

Battle of Al-Ruways (1266)
- Part of Crusades and Fall of Outremer
Date	28 October 1266
Location	Al-Ruways
Result	Mamluk victory

Belligerents
Kingdom of Jerusalem; Kingdom of France; Knights Templar; Knights Hospitaller; Teutonic Order	Mamluk Sultanate

Commanders and leaders
Hugh III of Lusignan; Geoffrey of Sargines; Stephan of Messy †	Unknown

Strength
1,100–1,200 men	Unknown

Casualties and losses
500 killed: 45 hospitallers killed	Unknown

The Battle of Al-Ruways was a military engagement between the Crusaders and the Mamluks in the village of Al-Ruways. The Mamluks ambushed the Crusader vanguard and wiped it out.

== Background ==
In the year 1266, the Mamluk Sultan Baybars besieged and captured the fort of Safed. This victory allowed the Mamluks to rule over Galilee. Afterwards, he advanced against Toron and captured it without resistance. Baybars destroyed the Christian village of Qara after being rumored to be helping the Crusaders. After these major campaigns, the Mamluks attempted to mount an assault against Antioch but failed. It would be only a matter of time before the Mamluks could launch another attack. Seeing their losses, the Crusaders attempted a counterattack. In August, Hugh III of Cyprus arrived in Acre and began assembling a force to raid the Muslims. The French regiment under Geoffrey of Sargines and the military orders of Templars, Hospitallers, and Teutons joined forces with Hugh.

== Battle ==
In October, the Crusaders set out from Acre with a force of 1,100–1,200 men. They set out towards the Tiberias district in the Galilee. The Mamluk garrison of Safed learned of the raid and began preparing to cut off their return. The Mamluks laid an ambush in the village of Al-Ruways. Shortly after, the Crusader began returning home. The vanguard was formed by the military orders led by Geoffrey. The vanguard became careless and lost contact with the main force, which was led by Hugh. The Mamluks surprised the Crusaders on the 28th and massacred them. Local Arabs joined the battle and began killing Crusader survivors and sacking their camp on the following night. Learning of this, Hugh was forced to retreat with heavy losses. The Crusader losses mounted to 500 killed, including 45 Hospitallers, including Stehpan of Messy, who was the grand commander in Acre.

== Sources ==
- Peter Thorau (1993), The Lion of Egypt: Sultan Baybars I and the Near East in the thirteenth century.
- Jaroslav Folda (2005), Crusader art in the Holy Land: from the Third Crusade to the fall of Acre, 1187-1291.
- Steven Runciman (1987), A History of the Crusades, Vol III.
