= Attack on Monastir =

Attack on Monastir (1603)
- Part of the Ottoman–Habsburg wars
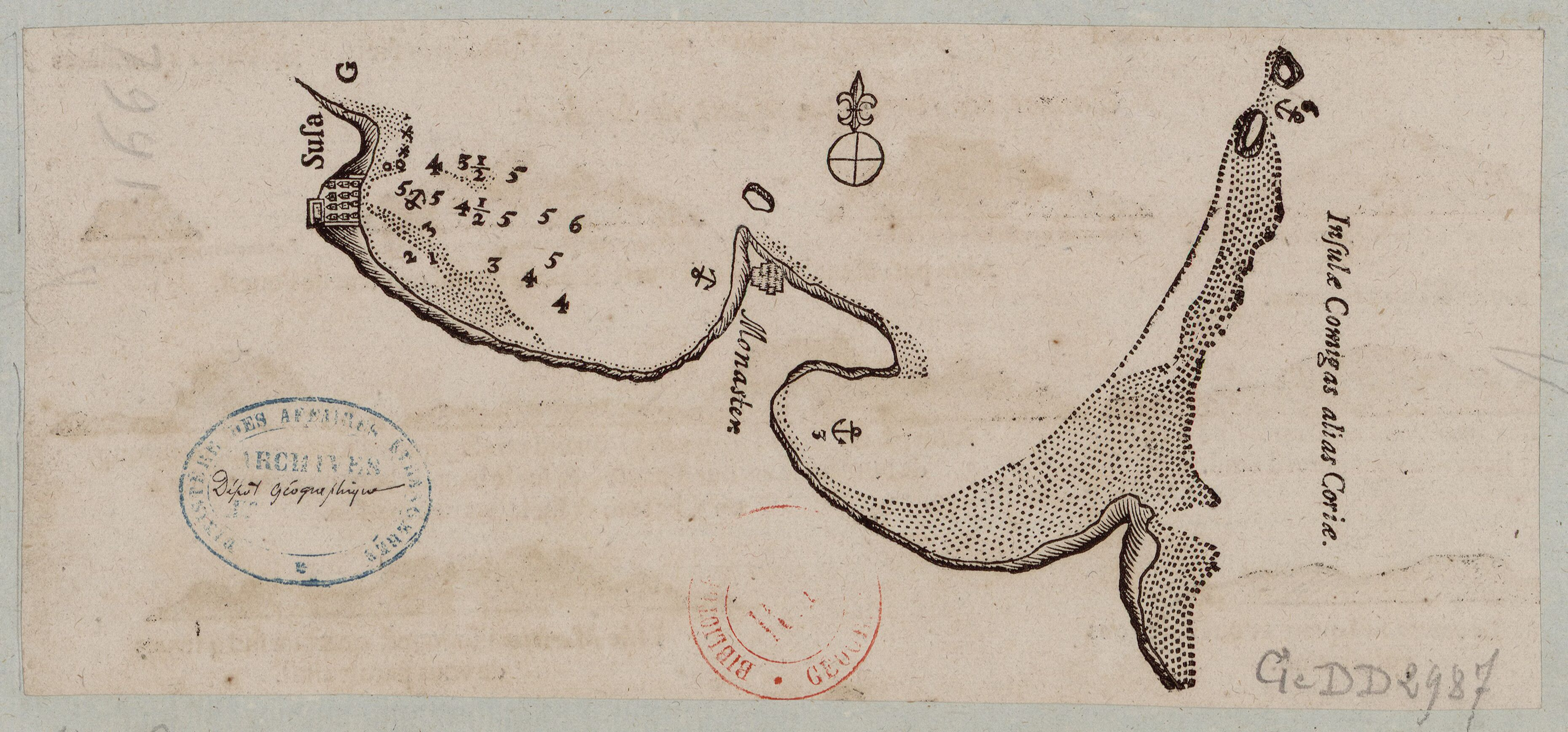
- Monastir in 17th Century
Date	6 October 1603
Location	Monastir, Tunisia
Result	Ottoman-Tunisian victory

Belligerents
(Sovereign Military Order of Malta) Knights Hospitaller	Ottoman Tunis

Commanders and leaders
(Sovereign Military Order of Malta) Alof de Wignacourt	Unknown

Strength
5 galleys	Unknown

Casualties and losses
Heavy	Unknown

The attack on Monastir was an attempt by the Maltese knights of Hospitallers to attack and sack the Tunisian city of Monastir; the attack, however, failed.

== Prelude ==
In April 1603, the Maltese knights launched a raid against the Ottoman-held cities of Patras and Nafpaktos. The Maltese simultaneously attacked both of them. The raid was successful, capturing 76 guns and 400 prisoners. In July of the same year, distressing news arrived in Malta regarding the intentions of the Ottoman Sultan, as he was preparing a large force of galleys to attack the island of Gozo to take revenge for the destruction of the previously mentioned castles. A preparation was made, but nothing came as the Ottomans did not appear due to the plague.

== Attack ==
Free from this worry, the Hospitaller grandmaster, Alof de Wignacourt, and the council decided to resume raids against the Ottomans. In October, it was decided to attack the Tunisian city of Monastir. On October 6, five Maltese galleys set out to attack the city. The Maltese knights landed at night; however, the Tunisian forces were alerted and quickly attacked the Maltese, routing them and forcing them to reembark. The attack had failed due to the treachery of a French soldier who alerted the Tunisians.

== Sources ==
- Roger Charles Anderson (1952), Naval Wars in the Levant, 1559-1853.
- Rivista del sovrano militare Ordine di Malta (1943), Alof de Wignacourt.
- Rinaldo Panetta (1984), Pirati e corsari turchi e barbareschi nel Mare Nostrum: Il tramonto della mezzaluna: XVII, XVIII, XIX secolo.
