= Isola delle Correnti Lighthouse =

Isola delle Correnti
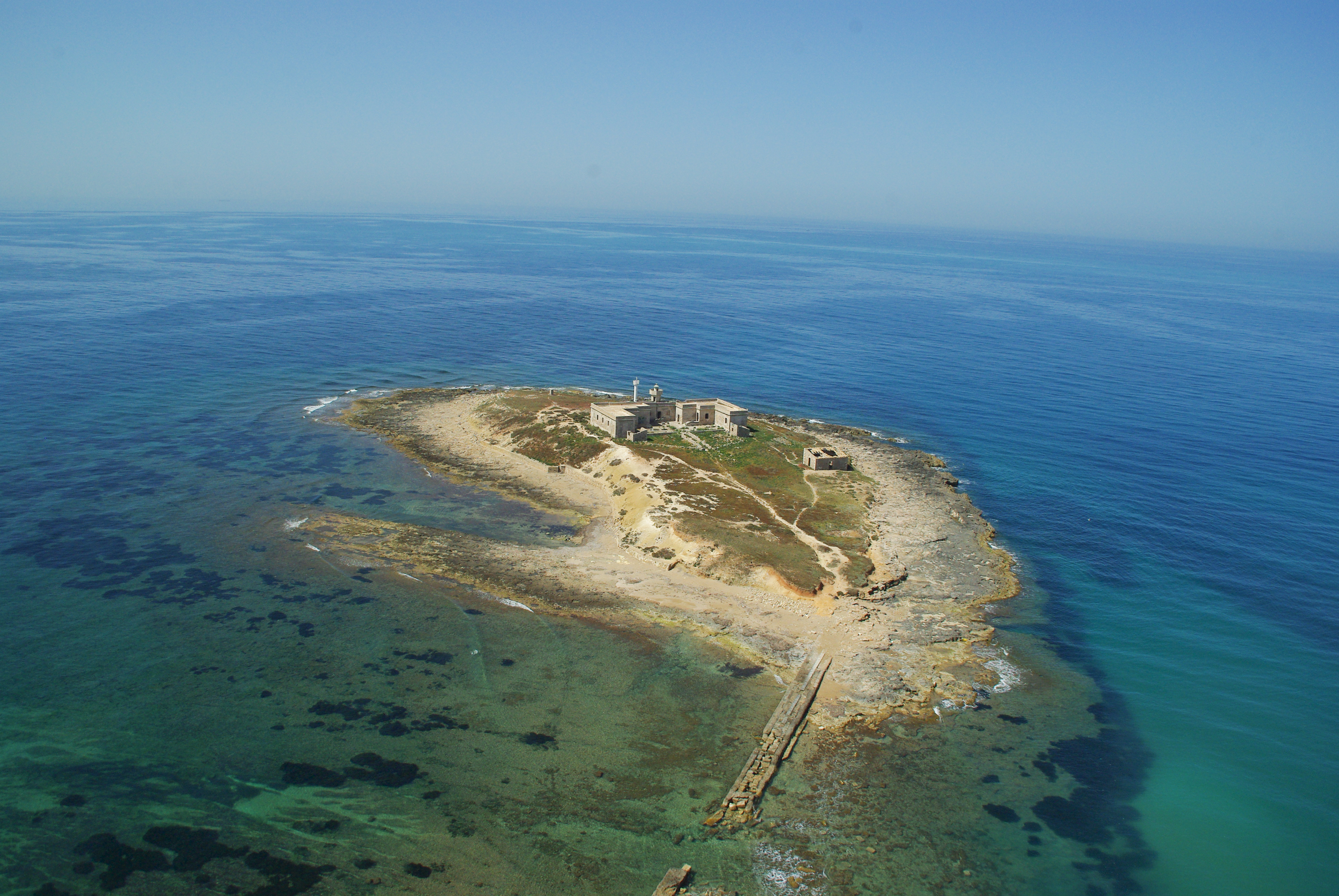
- Isola delle Correnti Lighthouse
- Location: Isola delle Correnti; Portopalo di Capo Passero; Sicily; Italy
- Coordinates: 36°38′42″N 15°04′39″E

Tower
- Constructed: 1865
- Foundation: concrete base (current)
- Construction: fibreglass tower (current) stone tower (first)
- Height: 11 metres (36 ft)
- Shape: cylindrical tower with balcony and light (current) octagonal tower with balcony and lantern attached to a 1-storey keeper's house (first)
- Markings: white tower and balcony (current) white tower and lantern, grey metallic lantern dome (first)
- Power source: mains electricity
- Operator: Marina Militare

Light
- First lit: 2000s.
- Deactivated: 2000s. (first)
- Focal height: 16 metres (52 ft)
- Intensity: MaxiHalo-60 EFF
- Range: 11 nautical miles (20 km; 13 mi)
- Characteristic: Fl W 4s.
- Italy no.: 2926 E.F.

Isola delle Correnti Lighthouse (Italian: Faro di Isola delle Correnti) is an active lighthouse located on an islet, 277 metres (909 ft) long and 152 metres (499 ft) wide, connected to mainland by a rocky isthmus, part of which is under water, on the southernmost tip of Sicily in the municipality of Portopalo di Capo Passero on the Malta Channel.

== Description ==
The lighthouse, built in 1865 by Genio Civile, consists of a stone octagonal tower, 11 metres (36 ft) high, with balcony and lantern attached to the seaward side of a 1-storey building that was originally a fortification. When the Marina Militare automated the lighthouse, the keeper's house was abandoned and fell to ruin. In the 2000s a new fibreglass tower was set up in front of the old. The light is positioned at 16 metres (52 ft) above sea level and emits one white flash in a 4 seconds period visible up to a distance of 11 nautical miles (20 km; 13 mi). The lighthouse is completely automated and managed by the Marina Militare with the identification code number 2926 E.F.

== See also ==
- List of lighthouses in Italy
