= Wilhelm of Prussia =

Wilhelm of Prussia may refer to:

- Prince Wilhelm of Prussia (1783–1851), son of Frederick William II of Prussia
- William I, German Emperor (1797–1888), King of Prussia and German Emperor, nephew of the above
- Wilhelm II (1859–1941), born Prince Wilhelm of Prussia, last German Emperor and King of Prussia, grandson of the above
- Wilhelm, German Crown Prince (1882–1951), last Crown Prince of the German Empire and the Kingdom of Prussia, son of the above
- Prince Wilhelm of Prussia (1906–1940), son of the above
- Wilhelm Karl Prinz von Preussen (1922–2007), grandson of Wilhelm II

== See also ==
- August Wilhelm of Prussia (disambiguation)
- Friedrich Wilhelm of Prussia (disambiguation)
- Franz Wilhelm Prinz von Preussen (born 1943), German businessman, great-grandson of Wilhelm II
