= Johanniter International =

Organization

- Logo of Johanniter International

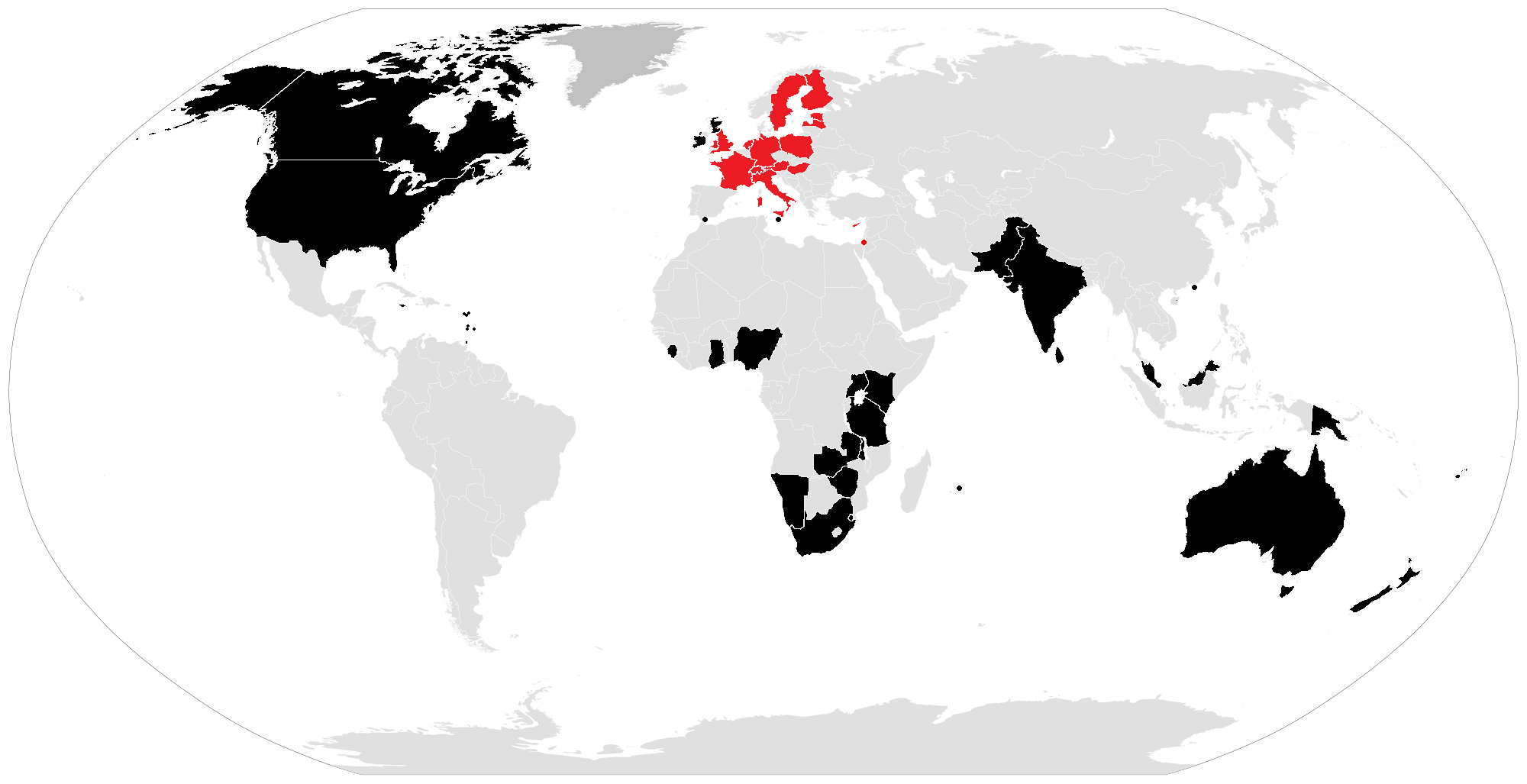
- Global network of St John, Countries with JOIN member organisations
- Abbreviation: JOIN
- Type: International non-governmental organisation
- Legal status: Association without lucrative purpose
- Location: Brussels, Belgium
- Coordinates: 50.844082°N 4.380518°E
- Region served: Europe and the Middle East
- Chairman: Johannes Bucher
- Vice Chairman: Christian Velten-Jameson
- General Manager: Joachim Berney
- Staff: 4
- Volunteers: 100,000
- Website: https://www.johanniter.org

Johanniter International (JOIN) is the partnership of the four protestant Orders of St. John and their national charities. Its member organisations, based in Europe and the Middle East, work in close cooperation and are supported by more than 100,000 volunteers. They serve humanity with medical services and first aid, social care, international aid, disaster relief and youth work. The services of JOIN’s member organisations are open to everyone.

Founded in 2000 and with headquarters in Brussels, Belgium, JOIN's primary goal lies in advocating the interest of the St John charities towards European and international bodies and facilitates international projects and working groups.

Since 2006, JOIN has been registered as an association without lucrative purpose (vereniging zonder winstoogmerk), a non-profit organisation under Belgian law. JOIN currently has 20 member organisations, 16 of which are national charities from Austria, Cyprus, Denmark, England, Finland, France, Germany, Hungary, Italy, Latvia, Malta, the Netherlands, Poland, Sweden and Switzerland, plus the St John Eye Hospital in Jerusalem. The four protestant Orders of Saint John (the Johanniterorden, the Johanniter Orde in Nederland, the Johanniterorden i Sverige and The Most Venerable Order of St John) which cooperate within the Alliance of the Orders of Saint John of Jerusalem, are also members of JOIN.

== Member organisations ==
Country	Name	Website
Austria	Johanniter-Unfall-Hilfe	Johanniter-Unfall-Hilfe
Cyprus	St John Association and Brigade	St John Association and Brigade
Denmark	Johanniterhjælpen	
England	St John Ambulance in England	St John Ambulance in England
Finland	Suomen Johanniittain apu - Johanniterhjälpen i Finland	
France	Association des oeuvres de Saint-Jean	Association des oeuvres de Saint-Jean
Germany	Johanniter-Unfall-Hilfe e.V.	Johanniter-Unfall-Hilfe
Hungary	Johannita Segitő Szolgálat	Johannita Segitő Szolgálat
Italy	Soccorso dell'Ordine di San Giovanni Italia	Soccorso dell'Ordine di San Giovanni Italia
Jerusalem	St John Eye Hospital Group	St John Eye Hospital Group
Latvia	Sveta Jana Palidziba	Sveta Jana Palidziba
Malta	St John Malta	
Netherlands	Johanniter Nederland	Johanniter Nederland
Poland	Joannici Dzieło Pomocy	Joannici Dzieło Pomocy
Sweden	Johanniterhjälpen i Sverige	Johanniterhjälpen
Switzerland	Oeuvre d’Entraide de la Commanderie Suisse de l’Ordre de St Jean	Oeuvre d’Entraide de la Commanderie Suisse de l’Ordre de St Jean
Germany	The Johanniter Order	
Netherlands	Johanniter Orde in Nederland	
England	The Most Venerable Order of St John	
Sweden	Johanniterorden i Sverige	

== Activity areas ==
The services provided by the member organisations vary substantially, they all share a common approach to humanitarian welfare and social aid. Core to their values is their Christian heritage which underlines their work. They all share a common approach to humanitarian welfare and social aid. They work with volunteers and employees to care for people in need in everyday life and in times of crisis. Their services are open to everyone.

JOIN's member organisations are active in the areas of emergency medical rescue, patient transport services, first aid, first aid training, international humanitarian assistance, youth work, food and clothing donations, educational institutions, patient repatriation, services for the disabled, elderly care and many others.

== Johanniter International in Brussels ==
The JOIN Office is located in Brussels, at the heart of decision making in the European Union. This enables the office to observe relevant European policy developments first hand and report these back to its member organisations, as well as to advocate the positions and interests of JOIN and its members directly to decision-makers.

Upon request and on behalf of JOIN member organisations, the office regularly takes part in various meetings at European level, for instance in the areas of humanitarian assistance, development cooperation, civil protection, care, research and innovation.

The office also acts as a communication and information centre for JOIN members, e.g. by publishing the monthly newsletter JOINews, by running an informative website and social networks and by replying to enquiries on European matters put forward by JOIN's members. Furthermore, the JOIN Office identifies relevant EU funding opportunities for its members.

In addition, the Secretariat maintains close contact with NGO partners, the Brussels offices of national and regional representations and with the members of the Orders of St John who work in the European capital.

== Working groups ==
Given the aim of JOIN to derive benefits for its members from increased exchange and cooperation, the working groups are one of the most essential institutions in JOIN. The working groups not only provide a platform where JOIN members can exchange knowledge and experience on any given issue. They also offer a space where JOIN members can set the thematic foundation for common projects. By combining resources within the network, JOIN can realise projects for which individual members might not possess the capacity.

Moreover, the working groups guarantee a participatory and transparent structure within JOIN as participation in the working groups is not only open to all members but also strongly encouraged. The working groups meet on a regular basis in face-to-face meetings at least once a year, and regularly schedules online and telephone conferences. Currently, JOIN features four permanent working groups:

Volunteering and Youth
This working group aims to deal with all issues regarding volunteering and youth work, including the exchange of volunteers and young people between JOIN members. This group discusses legal guidelines and recruitment of volunteers. as well as common interests in JOIN member’s youth activities such as first aid training and competitions, youth exchanges etc. In 2011, the working group was decisive in preparing JOIN’s activities in the context of the European Year of Volunteering 2011 and carrying out the Europe-wide Volunteer Swap. Since then, the Volunteer Swap is organised on an annual basis.
PR, Marketing & Communication
This working group deals with all issues concerning JOIN’s press work, the website, publications as well as corporate identity (CI) and corporate design (CD). In the past, for example, it developed the JOIN logo and helped develop brochures on JOIN activities. The main purpose of the group lies in sharing experiences, best practices and know-how on related topics.
Clinical
As its name suggests, the JOIN clinical working group deals with all clinical and medical cooperation. The group is made up of chief medical officers of JOIN members and its main aim is to exchange information on medical developments within the JOIN organisations as well as on the respective national levels. In 2019, the clinical group published the very first European First Aid Guidelines, which are freely available to the public in fifteen languages.
Fundraising
This working group aims to exchange best practice and know-how in Fundraising, grant management and other related topics, to mobilise financial resources and to strengthen Fundraising capacities and cooperation among JOIN members. It consists of senior members of fundraising departments of JOIN members.
