= Princess Donata of Prussia =

Prussian princess and equestrian journalist (1952–2026)

- Princess of Prussia
- Born: 24 December 1952; Bonn, West Germany
- Died: 25 February 2026 (aged 73)
Names
- Donata-Viktoria Ina-Marie Ottonie
- House: Hohenzollern
- Father: Wilhelm-Karl, Prince of Prussia
- Mother: Armgard von Veltheim
- Occupation: Journalist, editor

Princess Donata-Viktoria Ina-Marie Ottonie of Prussia (24 December 1952 – 25 February 2026) was a German member of the House of Hohenzollern and an equestrian journalist. She was the eldest child of Wilhelm-Karl, Prince of Prussia, and his wife, Armgard von Veltheim. A great-granddaughter of Wilhelm II, the last German Emperor, she was a member of the former German imperial family.

Donata pursued a professional career in equestrian journalism, specialising in eventing, international horse breeding, particularly Holsteiner horses, and major international championships. She served as editor-in-chief of PFERD+SPORT from 1992 until 2017 and worked in press relations for the Holsteiner Verband. She reported from Olympic Games, World Equestrian Games and European championships. In recognition of her contribution to equestrian sport, she received the Golden Badge of Honour of the Holsteiner Verband in 2017 and the Meteor Prize in 2018.

== Early life and family ==
Donata-Viktoria Ina-Marie Ottonie was born on 24 December 1952 in Bonn, West Germany. She was the eldest child of Wilhelm-Karl, Prince of Prussia (1922–2007), and Armgard von Veltheim (1926–2019), who married in 1952. She had two younger brothers, Prince Wilhelm-Karl and Prince Oskar.

Through her father, Donata was a great-granddaughter of Wilhelm II, the last German Emperor and King of Prussia. Her father was a grandson of Wilhelm II and served as Herrenmeister (Master of the Knights) of the Order of Saint John.

Donata spent her childhood in Lower Saxony, where she developed a strong interest in horses and equestrian sport. Her family's home was in Holzminden, where her father kept several horses. She began riding at a young age and became particularly interested in dressage and eventing.

As a young rider, she competed up to the German Junior Dressage Championships on a horse bred by her family. Although she subsequently concentrated on eventing, she remained interested in several equestrian disciplines throughout her life. Her early experience as a rider later informed her work as a journalist, giving her practical knowledge of horses, breeding and competition.

During the 1970s, Donata undertook an internship at Klosterhof Medingen with Eugen Wahler. Originally intended to last only a few weeks and provide experience in office administration and organisation, the placement developed into several years of involvement with the establishment. She also developed an interest in thoroughbred racing and was given opportunities to ride thoroughbreds in training under the guidance of trainer Hein Bollow.

== Career ==
Donata established a professional career in equestrian journalism. She worked for four years on the editorial staff of St. Georg, a German equestrian magazine, before joining the Rathmann publishing house in 1992. She had also worked with the Direktorium für Vollblutzucht und Rennen, the organisation responsible for German thoroughbred breeding and racing.

=== PFERD+SPORT ===
In 1992, Donata became editor-in-chief of PFERD+SPORT, a specialist equestrian magazine published by the Rathmann publishing house. She held the position until 2017, overseeing the magazine for 25 years. During this period, she became particularly associated with reporting on Holsteiner horse breeding, international eventing and major equestrian competitions.

Alongside her editorial responsibilities, she worked in press relations for the Holsteiner Verband, the organisation representing breeders of Holsteiner horses. Her work involved reporting on developments in breeding, competitions and the achievements of riders and horses associated with the breed.

In 2017, after 25 years as editor-in-chief, Donata entered partial retirement. She nevertheless remained involved with the magazine as a freelance contributor and continued to support equestrian journalism and the Holsteiner Verband.

=== International equestrian journalism ===
Donata reported from numerous major international equestrian competitions throughout her career, including the Olympic Games, World Equestrian Games and European championships. Her principal interest was eventing, although she also followed show jumping, dressage, thoroughbred breeding and other aspects of the equestrian world.

Among the events she covered were the 1992 Summer Olympics in Barcelona and the 2008 Summer Olympics, whose equestrian competitions were held in Hong Kong. The latter was particularly memorable for her because German event rider Hinrich Romeike won individual and team gold medals riding the Holsteiner gelding Marius.

She also reported on the 2006 FEI World Equestrian Games in Aachen and the 2010 FEI World Equestrian Games in Kentucky. Her coverage included leading international riders and horses, with particular attention to the development and performance of Holsteiner-bred horses.

=== Publications ===
In 2009, Donata contributed to the book Das Holsteiner Pferd, written alongside Gabriele Pochhammer, Thomas Nissen and Joachim Tietz. The publication examined the Holsteiner horse and its breeding tradition. Her contribution reflected her extensive professional knowledge of the breed and her longstanding involvement with its promotion.

== Awards and recognition ==
In November 2017, Donata received the Golden Badge of Honour of the Holsteiner Verband. The award was presented during the Holsteiner licensing event in Elmshorn in recognition of her longstanding contribution to equestrian journalism and the promotion of Holsteiner horses. Publisher Peter G. Rathmann was also honoured at the ceremony.

In 2018, she received the Meteor Prize from the Holsteiner Masters. The award recognises exceptional achievements and contributions to equestrian sport and horse breeding. Donata was selected in recognition of her 25 years as editor-in-chief of PFERD+SPORT and her extensive knowledge of Holsteiner breeding.

== Personal life ==
Donata never married or had children. She maintained a close connection with her family and the equestrian world throughout her life. Her personal interests remained centred on horses, particularly eventing, breeding and international competitions. She lived for many years in the vicinity of Luhmühlen, an important centre for international eventing in Lower Saxony.

== Death ==
Princess Donata died on 25 February 2026, aged 73, following a long illness. Her death was announced by the House of Hohenzollern, which paid tribute to her as a great-granddaughter of Wilhelm II and the daughter of Wilhelm-Karl, Prince of Prussia. The announcement also recognised her independent professional career and her contribution to equestrian journalism.

The Rathmann publishing house and Holsteiner Verband published a joint obituary on 26 February 2026, remembering her as a significant figure in the history of Holsteiner breeding and equestrian journalism. They highlighted her 25 years as editor-in-chief of PFERD+SPORT, her professional integrity and her extensive knowledge of horses.

Jan Tönjes, president of the International Alliance of Equestrian Journalists, also published a personal tribute on 26 February 2026. He recalled her expertise in eventing, her knowledge of international horse pedigrees and her longstanding contribution to equestrian journalism. He noted that she had spent her final months in Salzhausen, Lower Saxony.

An obituary published by Horse & Hound on 7 March 2026 described her as a journalist who had chronicled an entire era of equestrian sport. Her work left a record of international competitions, horse breeding and the development of the Holsteiner breed during her 25-year editorial career.
