= Ina Marie von Bassewitz-Levetzow =

German aristocrat (1888–1973)

- Princess Oskar of Prussia; Countess of Ruppin
- by Sandau, Berlin, 1915
- Born: 27 January 1888; Bristow, Grand Duchy of Mecklenburg-Schwerin, Empire of Germany
- Died: 17 September 1973 (aged 85); Munich, Bavaria, West Germany
- Burial: 19 September 1973; Burg Hohenzollern, Baden-Württemberg, West Germany
- Spouse: Prince Oskar of Prussia (m. 1914; died 1958)
- Issue: Prince Oskar; Prince Burchard; Princess Herzeleide; Prince Wilhelm-Karl
- House: Bassewitz
- Father: Count Carl von Bassewitz-Levetzow
- Mother: Countess Margarete von der Schulenburg

Princess Oskar of Prussia, Countess of Ruppin (born Countess Ina-Marie Helene Adele Elise von Bassewitz-Levetzow, 27 January 1888 – 17 September 1973) was a German aristocrat and the wife of Prince Oskar of Prussia.

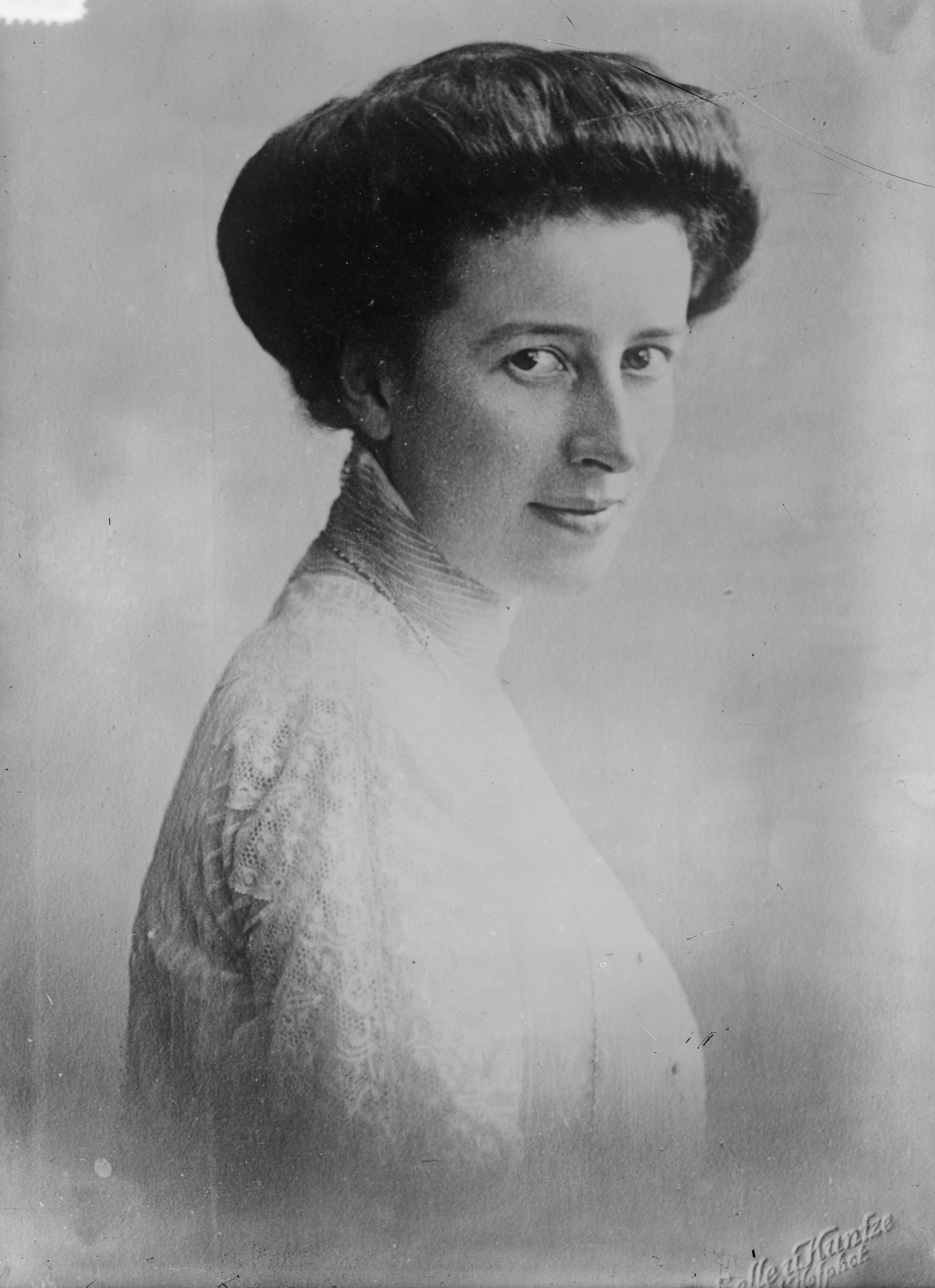
ca. 1910-1915

== Early life ==
Countess Ina-Marie Helene Adele Elise von Bassewitz-Levetzow was born on 27 January 1888 at Bristow, Mecklenburg, Germany, as the second child and the youngest daughter of Count carl Heinrich Ludwig von Bassewitz-Levetzow (1855-1921) and his wife, Countess Margarete Cäcilie Luise Alexandrine Friederike Susette von der Schulenburg (1864-1940). Her brother was Count Werner von Bassewitz-Levetzow, a highly decorated Oberst der Reserve in the Wehrmacht during World War II.

== Marriage ==
On 31 July 1914 she married Prince Oskar of Prussia, son of Emperor Wilhelm II and his wife Augusta Viktoria of Schleswig-Holstein-Sonderburg-Augustenburg. Both the civil and religious ceremonies took place at Schloß Bellevue in Berlin, Prussia. Initially the union was considered morganatic, but on 3 November 1919 was decreed to be dynastic in accordance with the house laws of the royal House of Hohenzollern. Prior to her marriage, on 27 July 1914, Ina-Marie had also gained the title Countess of Ruppin, and from 21 June 1920, was titled Princess of Prussia with the style Royal Highness. The couple had four children:

- Prince Oskar Wilhelm Karl Hans Kuno of Prussia (12 July 1915 Potsdam, Germany – 5 September 1939 Poland); died in World War II.
- Prince Burchard Friedrich Max Werner Georg of Prussia (8 January 1917 – 12 August 1988); married Countess Eleonore Fugger von Babenhausen on 30 January 1961, no issue.
- Princess Herzeleide Ina-Marie Sophie Charlotte Else of Prussia (25 December 1918 – 22 March 1989); married Karl, Prince Biron von Kurland on 15 August 1938, with issue.
- Prince Wilhelm Karl Adalbert Erich Detloff of Prussia (20 January 1922 – 9 April 2007); married Armgard Else Helene von Veltheim on 1 March 1952, with issue. He was the last living grandchild of Emperor Wilhelm II; was the thirty-sixth Herrenmeister of the Order of Saint John (Bailiwick of Brandenburg).

== Death ==
Princess Ina-Marie of Prussia, Countess von Ruppin, died in Munich, Bavaria, on 17 September 1973. She was buried two days later, on 19 September 1973, in the Hohenzollern Castle, Baden-Württemberg, Germany.

== Ancestry ==
Ancestors of Ina Marie von Bassewitz-Levetzow

8. Count Adolph Christian von Bassewitz
4. Count Karl von Bassewitz
9. Luise von Levetzow
2. Count Carl von Bassewitz-Levetzow
10. Jaspar von Bülow
5. Ina von Bülow
11. Henriette von Jasmund
1. Countess Ina Marie von Bassewitz-Levetzow
12. Count Werner von der Schulenburg
6. Count Werner von der Schulenburg
13. Baroness Henriette von Waldenfels
3. Countess Margarete von der Schulenburg
14. Baron Gustav von Maltzahn
7. Baroness Marie von Maltzahn
15. Countess Cäcilie von Plessen-Maltzahn
