= Oskar Prinz von Preussen =

German prince (born 1959)

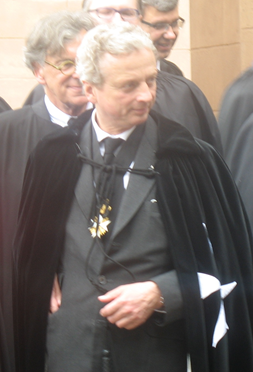
- Prince Oskar robed as Grand Master of the Johanniterorden
- Born: Oskar Michael Hans Karl; 6 May 1959 (age 67); Bonn, Germany
- Spouse: Auguste Zimmermann von Siefart (m. 1992)
- Issue: Prinz Oskar; Prinzessin Wilhemine; Prinz Albert
Names
- Oskar Michael Hans Karl von Preussen
- House: Hohenzollern
- Father: Wilhelm Karl Prince of Prussia
- Mother: Armgard von Veltheim
- Occupation: Businessman

Oskar Michael Hans Karl Prinz von Preussen (born 6 May 1959) is a member of the House of Hohenzollern, the former ruling house of Germany.

Prince Oskar serves as the thirty-seventh Grand Master (Herrenmeister) of the Johanniter Order.

== Life ==
The second son of Wilhelm-Karl Prince of Prussia and of his wife Armgard von Veltheim, Prince Oskar's great-grandfather was Wilhelm II, the last German Emperor and King of Prussia.

Married since 1992 to Auguste Zimmermann von Siefart (born 1962), Prince and Princess Oskar have three children:

- Oskar Julius Alvo Carlos (born 29 November 1993); he married in April 2024 Baroness Johanna of Jenisch
- Wilhelmine Auguste Donata Maria Armgard (born 7 July 1995); she married in June 2025 Baron Leonard of Stenglin
- Albert Burchard Carl Marcus Nikolaus (born 13 July 1998).

In 1995 Prince Oskar took a Ph.D. in history from the Free University of Berlin with his thesis about relations between the Emperor Wilhelm II and the United States. He has since made a career as a media manager: as managing director of the German branch of Discovery Channel, founder of KiKa, new media manager of Hubert Burda Media Group and radio manager of Holtzbrinck Publishing Group.

In 2017 Oskar was named Patron of the Altmark Festival, a music festival in Saxony-Anhalt.

== Order of Saint John (Bailiwick of Brandenburg) ==
In 1999 Prince Oskar was appointed Herrenmeister (Grand Master) of the Order of Saint John (Bailiwick of Brandenburg), following his father Prince Wilhelm-Karl of Prussia and his grandfather Prince Oskar of Prussia who both previously served as Herrenmeister.

Active in promoting the numerous charitable and volunteer organisations connected with the Order of St John, in 2013 Prince Oskar represented the Bailiwick at an ecumenical celebration in Berlin to observe the Knights Hospitallers' 900th anniversary. On June 25, 2021, Prinz Oskar welcomed President Frank-Walter Steinmeier to the Johanniter Hospital at Treuenbrietzen.

=== Works ===
- Wilhelm II. und die Vereinigten Staaten von Amerika: zur Geschichte seiner ambivalenten Beziehung. Dissertation. Freie Universität Berlin 1995. Ars Una, Neuried 1997, ISBN 3-89391-058-1.

== See also ==
- The Alliance of the Orders of Saint John of Jerusalem
