= Princess Herzeleide of Prussia =

Princess Herzeleide
- Princess Biron von Courland
- Born: 25 December 1918; Bristow, Mecklenburg-Vorpommern, Weimar Republic
- Died: 22 March 1989 (aged 70); Munich, West Germany
- Burial: 27 March 1989; Nordfriedhof, Munich, Bavaria, Germany
- Spouse: Karl, Prince Biron von Courland (m. 1938; died 1982)
- Issue: Princess Benigna; Ernst-Johann Biron, Prince of Courland; Prince Michael
Names
- German: Herzeleide-Ina-Marie Sophie Charlotte Else
- House: Hohenzollern
- Father: Prince Oskar of Prussia
- Mother: Countess Ina Marie von Bassewitz

Princess Herzeleide Ina-Marie Sophie Charlotte Else of Prussia (25 December 1918 – 22 March 1989) was a member of the deposed House of Hohenzollern. She was the only daughter of Prince Oskar of Prussia (the second youngest son of Emperor Wilhelm II) and his initially morganatic wife, Countess Ina Marie von Bassewitz. She is the mother of Ernst-Johann Biron, Prince of Courland, the current head of the House of Biron.

== Biography ==
=== Family and early life ===
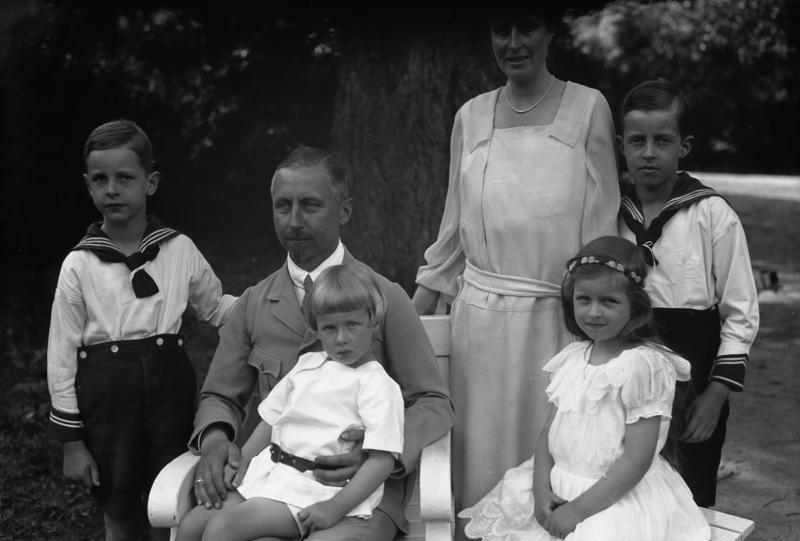
Princess Herzeleide with her parents and brothers, c. 1925.

Countess Herzeleide-Ina-Marie von Ruppin was born in Bristow, Mecklenburg, on 25 December 1918, shortly after the defeat of the German Empire and the collapse of the monarchy. She was consequently given the name Herzeleide, meaning "heart's sorrow". She had three brothers: Oscar, Burchard, and Wilhelm-Karl. Herzeleide and her brothers became Princess/Prince of Prussia on 21 June 1920 when their parents' morganatic marriage was recognised as dynastic by the deposed Emperor Wilhelm II.

During the 1930s, she attended Augusta Victoria College, a girls' finishing school for daughters of high-ranking Nazi officials and German nobility in Bexhill-on-Sea, East Sussex, England. In early 1938, Herzeleide was one of three bridesmaids at the wedding of the future King Paul of Greece to Frederica of Hanover, her first cousin.

=== Marriage and issue ===
On 15 August 1938 in Potsdam Garrison Church, Herzeleide married Prince Karl Biron von Courland (15 June 1907 – 28 February 1982). Karl was the eldest son and heir of Prince Gustav Biron of Courland and Françoise Lévisse de Montigny, daughter of Marquis de Jaucourt. He was a direct descendant of Ernst Johann von Biron who obtained sovereignty of the Baltic Duchy of Courland and Semigallia in the 18th century. Along with the bride and groom's parents, in attendance were the former German Crown Prince Wilhelm and Emperor Wilhelm's consort, Empress Hermine. All male guests wore uniforms of the former German army. The couple's honeymoon plans included a visit to Doorn to pay respects to Emperor Wilhelm in exile, the bride's paternal grandfather. Subsequently, they took up residence in Munich.

They had three children:

- Princess Viktoria-Benigna Ina-Marie Cecilie Friederike-Luise Helene Biron von Courland (born 2 July 1939) married Johannes, Baron von Twickel on 3 May 1968, and had issue:
  - Nikolaus Maximilian Ludwig Karl Ernst-Johann Maria von Twickel (Nikolaus, Baron von Twickel) married to Georgia Marianne Fischer, and has issue:
    - Constantin Philipp Ludwig Friedrich von Twickel
    - Benedikta Elisabeth Ann Lucia von Twickel
    - Georg von Twickel
    - Kyril von Twickel
  - Tassilo Heinrich Alexander von Twickel (Tassilo, Baron von Twickel) married to Janine Schniewind, and has issue:
    - Antonius von Twickel
    - Matilda Valentina Helga Benigna von Twickel
- Ernst-Johann, Prince Biron von Courland (born 6 August 1940) married to Countess Elisabeth Victoria Raimonda of Isenburg-Philippseich
- Prince Michael Karl August Wilhelm Biron von Courland (born 20 January 1944) married to Kristin von Oertzen on 1 July 1969, and has issue:
  - Princess Veronika Biron von Courland (born 23 January 1970) married to Christoph Carl on 7 October 2006
  - Prince Alexander Biron von Courland (born 18 September 1972) married to Countess Michaela Strachwitz von Groß-Zauche und Camminetz (born 19 Mar 1979) on 16 August 2003
  - Princess Stephanie Biron von Courland (born 24 September 1975) married to Georg Güber on 13 September 2008

== Ancestry ==
Ancestors of Princess Herzeleide of Prussia

8. Frederick III, German Emperor
4. Wilhelm II, German Emperor
9. Victoria, Princess Royal
2. Prince Oskar of Prussia
10. Frederick VIII, Duke of Schleswig-Holstein-Sonderburg-Augustenburg
5. Princess Augusta Victoria of Schleswig-Holstein-Sonderburg-Augustenburg
11. Princess Adelheid of Hohenlohe-Langenburg
1. Princess Herzeleide of Prussia
12. Count Karl August Louis von Bassewitz
6. Count Karl von Bassewitz-Levetzow
13. Ina von Bülow
3. Countess Ina Marie von Bassewitz
14. Count Werner Ludwig von der Schulenburg
7. Countess Margarethe von der Schulenburg
15. Baroness Marie von Maltzahn
