= Albert of Hohenzollern =

Albert of Prussia or Albert of Hohenzollern (in German, Albrecht von Hohenzollern) may refer to:

- Albrecht III Achilles (1414–1486), Elector of Brandenburg
- Albert of Mainz (1490–1545), also known as Albert of Brandenburg, archbishop
- Albert, Duke of Prussia (1490–1568)
- Albert Frederick, Duke of Prussia (1553–1618)
- Prince Albert of Prussia (1809–1872), the fifth son and youngest child of King Frederick William III of Prussia and Louise of Mecklenburg-Strelitz
- Prince Albert of Prussia (1837–1906), son of the above
- Prince Albert of Prussia (born 1998), son of Prince Oskar of Prussia
