= Alliance of the Orders of Saint John of Jerusalem =

European federation of chivalric orders

Emblem with a Maltese cross

The Alliance of the Orders of Saint John of Jerusalem is a federation of European (mostly Protestant) chivalric orders that share inheritance of the tradition of the medieval military Knights Hospitaller (Order of Knights of the Hospital of Saint John of Jerusalem).

== History ==
The Alliance was formed in 1961 to encourage closer collaboration between its member orders in matters of common concern, and comprises:

- The Johanniterorden (Balley Brandenburg des Ritterlichen Ordens Sankt Johannis vom Spital zu Jerusalem, or the "Bailiwick of Brandenburg of the Chivalric Order of Saint John of the Hospital of Jerusalem"), based in Germany, as well as the non-German commanderies affiliated with the Bailiwick of Brandenburg, of which four have an autonomous status:
  - the Johanniter Ridderskapet i Finland, based in Finland,
  - the Association des Chevaliers de St. Jean, based in France,
  - the Kommende der Johanniterritter in der Schweiz, based in Switzerland, and
  - the Johannita Rend Magyar Tagozata, based in Hungary.
- The Johanniter Orde in Nederland, based in The Netherlands.
- The Johanniterorden i Sverige, based in Stockholm, Sweden.
- The Most Venerable Order of the Hospital of St John of Jerusalem, based in the United Kingdom.

The Johanniter Orde in Nederland and the Johanniterorden i Sverige were formerly commanderies of the Bailiwick of Brandenburg. They became independent orders under the respective monarchs in 1946.

As John Brooke-Little (when Norroy and Ulster King of Arms) later put into writing, the principal impetus for the concordat of 1961 was not ecumenism or brotherhood: it was signed because none of the few remaining legitimate orders of Saint John could effectively shield themselves from the claims of the self-styled orders while the legitimate orders continuously debated among themselves which of them was legitimate. This concordat led to the establishment of the Alliance of the Orders of St. John.

The presidency of the Alliance rotates between the four Orders of Saint John.

== Mutual recognition ==
The four non-Catholic constituent orders of the Alliance also mutually recognise the Roman Catholic Sovereign Military Order of Malta (SMOM). SMOM is acknowledged as being the senior order, with the other Alliance members stemming from the same root. None of the five mutually-recognised orders accept the claims of any other organisation that calls itself an "Order of Saint John", (which SMOM, the Alliance Orders and others describe as "self-styled"), nor their claims to be successors of the medieval Order of Saint John, nor any right to use the name and symbols of that order.

In 1975, the Alliance Orders, together with the Sovereign Military Order of Malta, established what is today known as the Committee on the Orders of Saint John, a collaborative body focused on protecting their shared heritage, including names and symbols. For many years the president of the Committee was Friedrich Wilhelm, Prince of Hohenzollern (1924–2010), and more recently Lt. Col. Peregrine Bertie, brother of the former Grand Master of SMOM, Fra' Andrew Bertie (1929–2008). He was succeeded by Fra' John T. Dunlap (2018–2024), until the latter was elected Grand Master of SMOM. The current president is Michael Grace.

== Current activity ==
The French branch of the Johanniterorden was founded in 1960. It is active in France and Madagascar. It shelters relatives of hospital patients.

== Common Prayer ==
The Alliance has a common prayer, approved at the annual meeting on 13 April 2024.

== See also ==
- Johanniter International, a network of charities affiliated with the Alliance Orders
