= Augusta Victoria College =

Defunct girls' finishing school in England

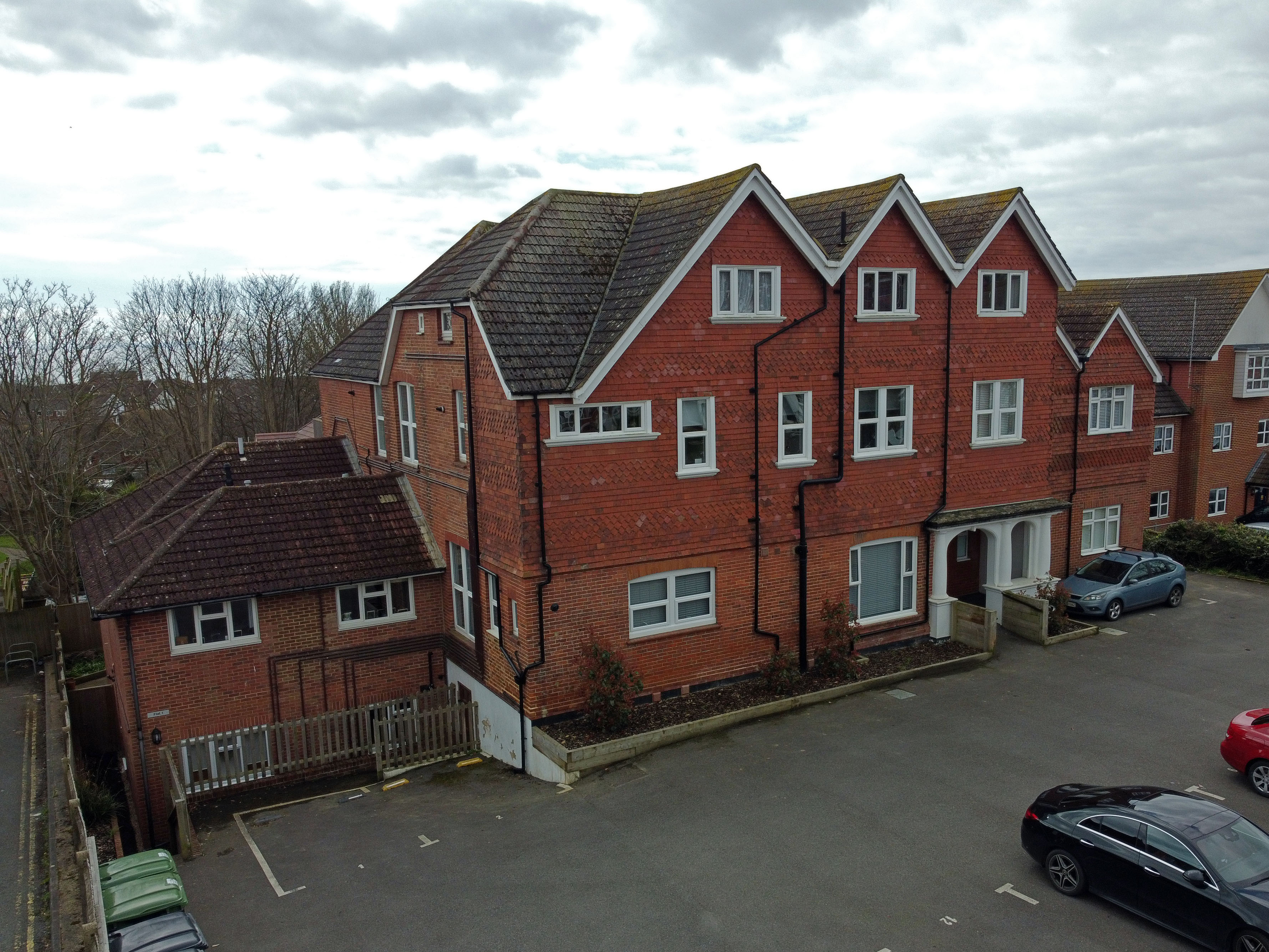
- The building that housed the school

Location
- 82, then 88 (now 128) Dorset Road, Bexhill-on-Sea, East Sussex, TN40 2HT; United Kingdom; 50.846934°N 0.488737°E

Information
- Other name: Lindsay Hall
- Type: Girls' finishing school
- Established: 1932
- Founder: Frau Helena Rocholl
- Closed: 26 August 1939
- Gender: Girls
- Age: 16 to 21

Augusta Victoria College was a girls' finishing school for daughters of high-ranking Nazi officials and German nobility in Bexhill-on-Sea, East Sussex, England, during the 1930s before World War Two. It was named after the last German empress, Augusta Victoria of Schleswig-Holstein (1858–1921).

The school was established in 1932 and closed in 1939 due to World War Two. It started at 82 Dorset Road and moved to Lindsay Hall (88, now 128, Dorset Road) in 1935.

Notable students included Bettina von Ribbentrop, the daughter of Joachim von Ribbentrop, the German Minister of Foreign Affairs under the Third Reich. Others included Isa von Bergen, the daughter of Carl-Ludvig Diego von Bergen, envoy to the Vatican, and Princess Herzeleide of Prussia, the granddaughter of Kaiser Wilhelm II, who himself was the grandson of Queen Victoria. Others included the goddaughter of the chief of the German police, Heinrich Himmler, and the niece of the German ambassador to Britain, Herbert von Dirksen.

It was the aim of Hitler to have Nazi-aligned women marry into the British aristocracy and influence British politics. The college's blazer badge included a Union Flag and Swastika.

The school's building, Lindsay Hall, later became a nursing home, and was converted into flats.

The 2020 film Six Minutes to Midnight dramatized events at the school.

In 2026 a history of the school, written by Paul StJohn Mackintosh, was published by Pen & Sword books with the title "Hitler's Finishing School: Augusta Victoria College"

== See also ==
- Six Minutes to Midnight
