= Philip Riedesel zu Camberg =

Philip Riedesel zu Camberg was an important German knight (Ritter) in the latter half of the 16th century. He was the son of Henrich Riedesel zu Camberg and Catherine von Sebolt. He entered the Johanniterorden (the Bailiwick of Brandenburg of the Order of Saint John) in 1569, with the position of Komtur (knight commander, or preceptor) in Erlingen and as a Receptor. He served as the Grand Master of the order in northern Germany 1594–1598. During this time, he served as General of the Danube fleet in the long Turkish war (1593–1606) between the Holy Roman Empire and the Ottoman Empire. He died in 1598.

== Sources ==
Vladimir von Schnurbein, "Die Bemühungen des Hauses Habsburg zur Ansiedlung von Ritterorden beim Aufbau der Militärgrenze." Militär und Gesellschaft in der Frühen Neuzeit, November 2008, Heft 1.

Georg Helwich, Genealogia der Geburtslini dess Uhralten Adelichen Geschlechts der Riedesel vom Camburg, 1651.
