= Ordenspalais =

Former government building in Berlin

Coordinates: 52°30′45″N 13°23′01″E

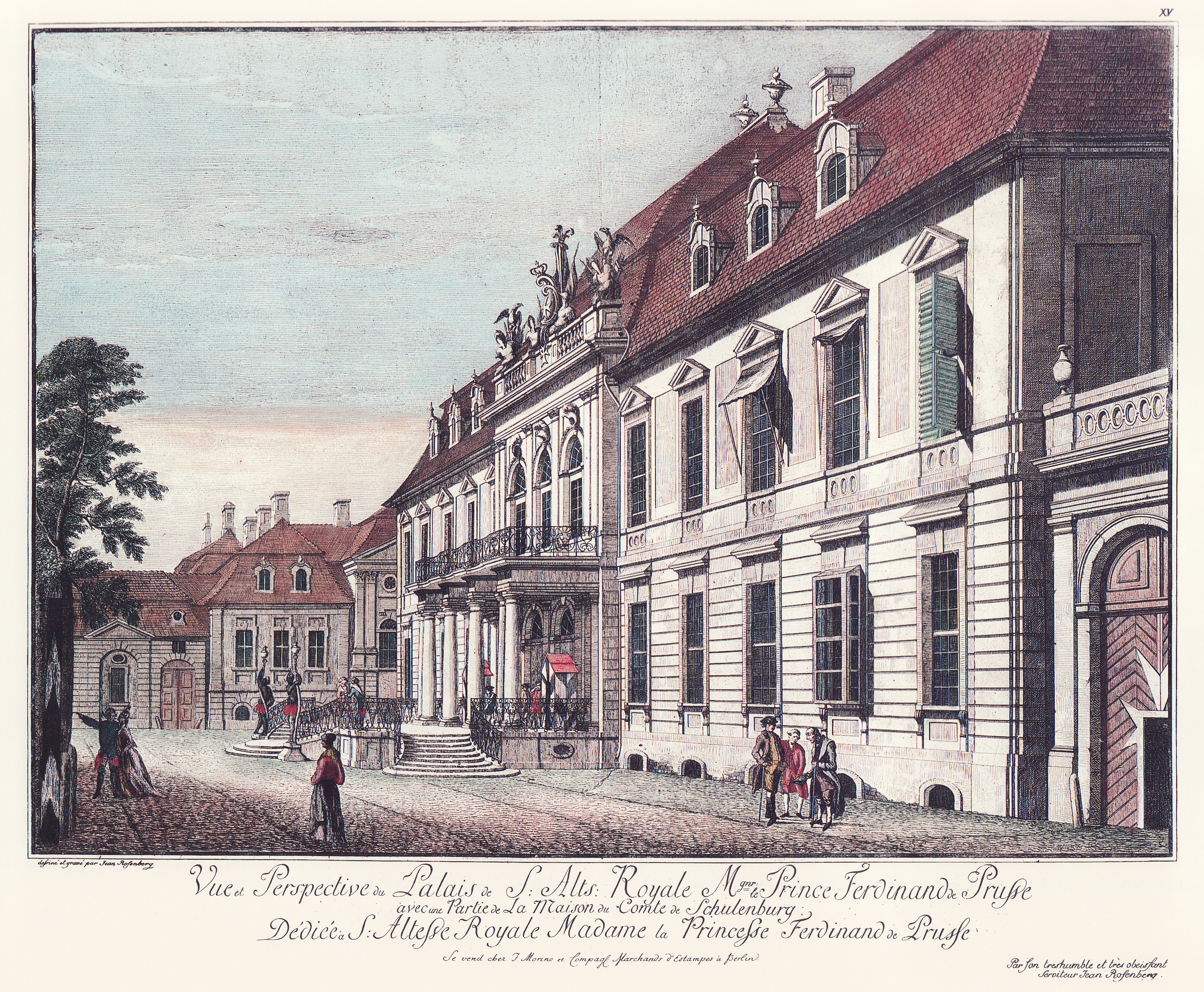
Ordenspalais, then Palais Prince Ferdinand of Prussia, engraving by Johann Georg Rosenberg, about 1780

The Ordenspalais ("Palace of the Order [of Saint John]") was a building on the northern corner of Wilhelmplatz with Wilhelmstraße in Berlin (now in Berlin-Mitte).

== History ==
Erection of the building at Wilhelmplatz No. 7/8 began in 1737 as the residence of the Prussian Major General Karl Ludwig, Count of Waldburg-Capustigall, who died the next year. By command of King Frederick William I of Prussia, the palace was finished by the Order of Saint John (the Johanniterorden) according to plans by Carl Friedrich Richter, who also designed the neighbouring Palais Schulenburg (later the German Reich Chancellery). From 1738, the palace was the principal residence of the Herrenmeister ("Master of the Knights"), chief of the Order, and housed the Berlin legation of the Order. The palace later was renamed for Prince Augustus Ferdinand of Prussia, who was Herrenmeister from 1763 to 1811.

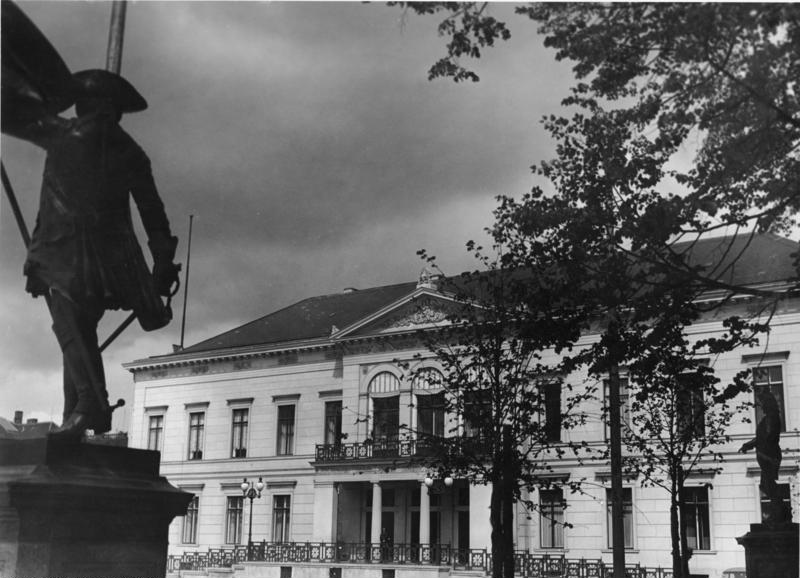
The Ordenspalais in 1936

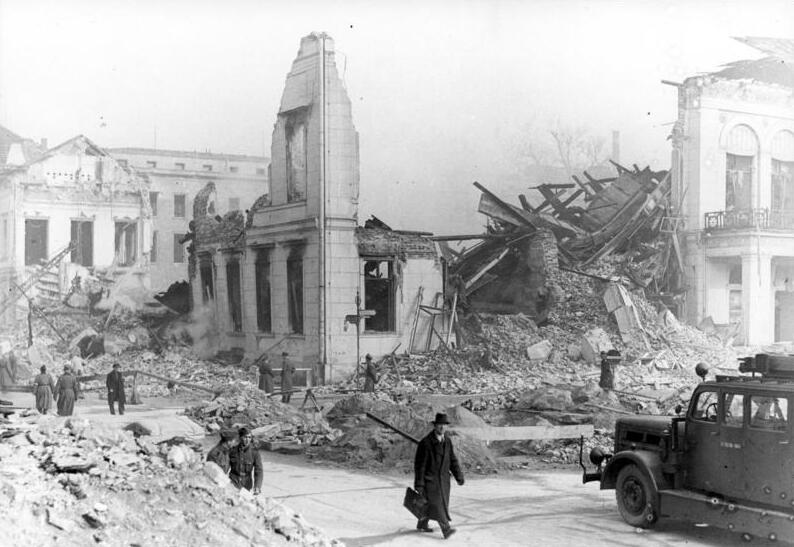
Ruins of the Ordenspalais in March 1945

The Kingdom of Prussia took over the building in 1811, upon the dissolution of the Order by a government desperate for funds in the midst of the Napoleonic Wars, and the building thereafter housed several governmental agencies before Prince Charles of Prussia made it his residence in 1829. He had the palace remodeled in a Neoclassical style according to plans by Karl Friedrich Schinkel, with an annex built by Friedrich August Stüler. In 1853, the building, now numbered Wilhelmplatz No. 8/9, saw the solemn restoration of the Johanniterorden and Prince Charles's installation as the new Herrenmeister. After his death in 1883, the palace remained the residence of Prince Charles's descendants Princes Frederick Charles and Friedrich Leopold of Prussia.

After World War I and the fall of the Prussian monarchy, the palace became the subject of a lengthy lawsuit between the House of Hohenzollern and the Free State of Prussia. The palace remained empty until the German government made it the offices of the united press department of the Reichsregierung and the Foreign Office, which held daily press conferences here. In March 1933, the building became the headquarters of the Reich Ministry of Public Enlightenment and Propaganda led by Joseph Goebbels. During his tenure, the building was again enlarged, with Stüler's annex extended and rebuilt until 1940.

The Ordenspalais itself was destroyed in the last months of World War II. The annex, renumbered Wilhelmstraße No. 49, survived and from 1947 was the seat of the East German National Front organization. Since 1999, the building has held the main offices of the German Federal Ministry of Labour and Social Affairs.
