= Friedrich Wilhelm of Prussia =

Friedrich Wilhelm of Prussia may refer to:

- Prince Friedrich Wilhelm of Prussia
- Frederick III, German Emperor
- Friedrich Wilhelm III of Prussia
- Friedrich Wilhelm III
- Friedrich Wilhelm II of Prussia
- Friedrich Wilhelm IV of Prussia
- Friedrich Wilhelm I of Prussia
