= Prince Oskar of Prussia =

Prussian prince (1888–1958)

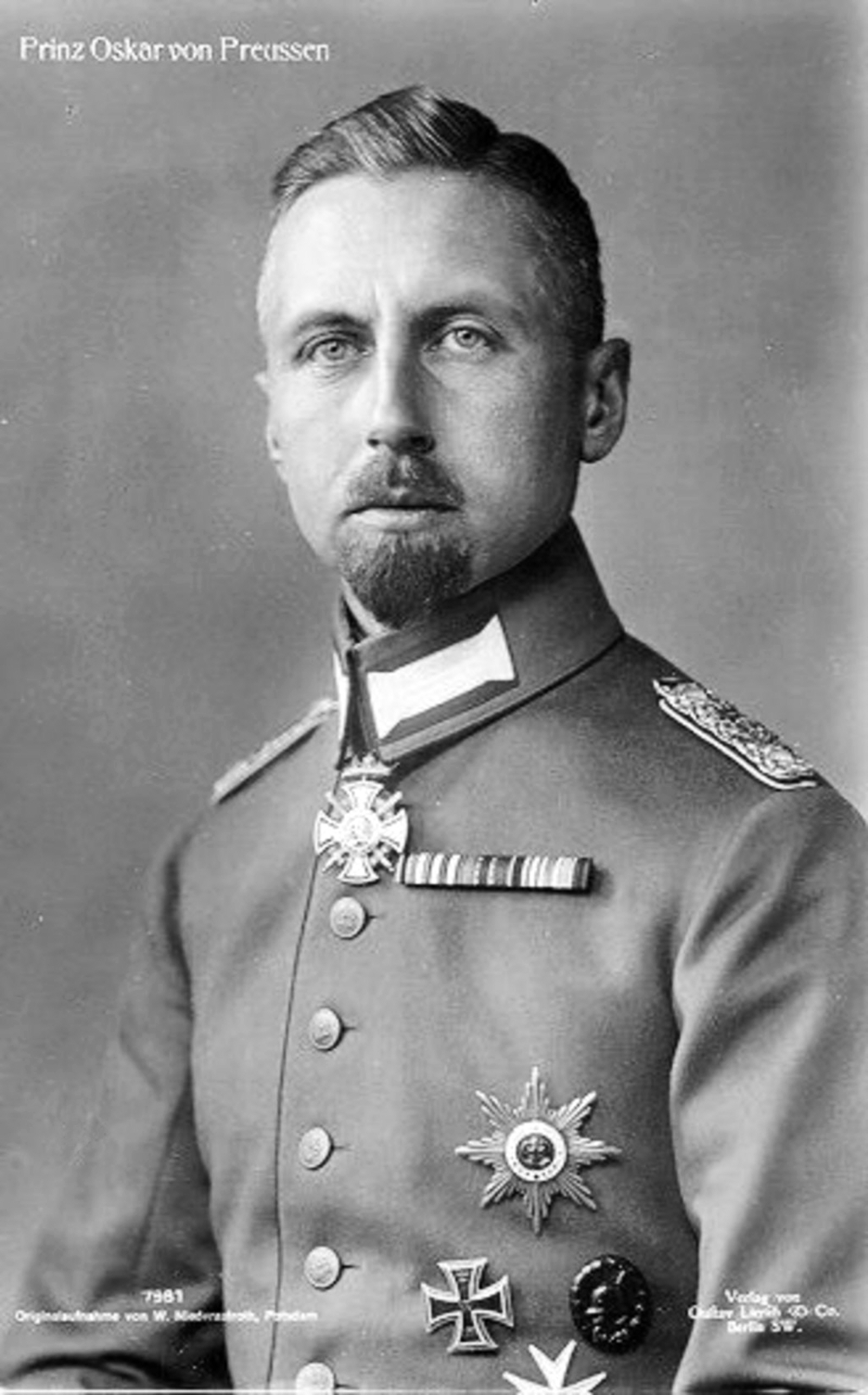
- Oskar c. 1914
- Born: 27 July 1888; Marmorpalais, Potsdam, Prussia, German Empire
- Died: 27 January 1958 (aged 69); Munich, Bavaria, West Germany
- Burial: 1 February 1958; Burg Hohenzollern, Baden-Württemberg, Germany
- Spouse: Ina Marie von Bassewitz (m. 1914)
- Issue: Oskar; Burchard; Herzeleide; Wilhelm-Karl
Names
- Oskar Karl Gustav Adolf
- House: Hohenzollern
- Father: Wilhelm II, German Emperor
- Mother: Augusta Victoria of Schleswig-Holstein-Sonderburg-Augustenburg

Oskar Karl Gustav Adolf Prince of Prussia (27 July 1888 – 27 January 1958) was the fifth son of German Emperor Wilhelm II and Augusta Victoria of Schleswig-Holstein-Sonderburg-Augustenburg.

== Biography ==
=== Birth and family ===
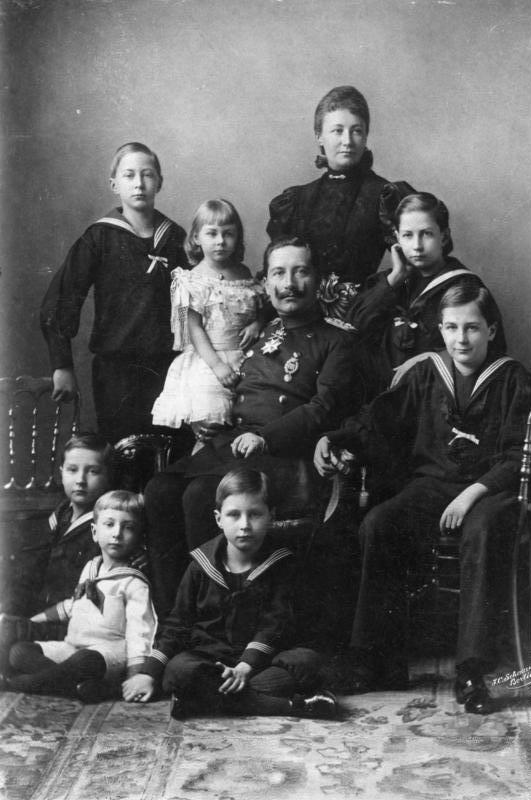
Wilhelm II with his family in 1896. Prince Oskar is in the centre in front of Wilhelm II.

Prinz Oskar of Prussia was born on 27 July 1888 at his parents' residence in the Marmorpalais of Potsdam in the Province of Brandenburg. He was the fifth son of the German Emperor Wilhelm II, and his first wife, Princess Augusta Victoria of Schleswig-Holstein, and was born in the so-called Year of the Three Emperors, just a month after his 29-year-old father had become German Emperor and King of Prussia. He was baptised in the chapel of the Royal Palace on the Spree Island in central Berlin and was named after King Oscar II of Sweden and Norway, who was also his godfather.

Prince Oskar had five brothers: Crown Prince Wilhelm, Prince Eitel Friedrich, Prince Adalbert, Prince August Wilhelm, Prince Joachim and one sister: Princess Viktoria Luise. He spent his childhood with his six siblings at the New Palace, also in Potsdam.

=== Education ===
Prince Oskar was educated as a cadet at the Prinzenhaus in Plön, in his mother's ancestral Schleswig-Holstein, as his brothers had been before him. He made the news in 1902 when he fractured his collar bone after a fall from the horizontal bars.

=== Military career ===
During the early months of the First World War, he commanded Grenadierregiment "König Wilhelm I." (2. Westpreussisches) Nr. 7 in the field as its colonel. Future fighter ace Manfred von Richthofen witnessed the 22 August 1914, attack on Virton, Belgium, and wrote of Prinz Oskar's bravery and his inspirational leadership at the front of his regiment as they went into combat. For this action, Oskar earned the Iron Cross, Second Class. A month later, at Verdun, Oskar again led his men in a successful assault into heavy combat, and was awarded the Iron Cross, First Class. After this action, he also collapsed and had to be removed from the field. Awarded the wound badge for his injuries, he spent much of the autumn of 1914 recovering from what was reported to be a heart condition. He eventually returned to duty and served on the Eastern Front, where he was again awarded the wound badge. When Finland gained indpendence, Oskar was a candidate for the nation's throne.

In the early 1920s, his name was listed with other members of the general staff or the royal family accused of war crimes, and was condemned in the Press for applying for a colonel's pension from the Weimar Republic.

During the 1930s, when the Hohenzollern family attempted to test the waters for a return to power through Nationalist Socialism, Oskar appears to have played along, and eventually was commissioned at Generalmajor zur Verfügung (rank equivalent to brigadier general, "available for assignment"), circa 1 March 1940. As the family fell out of favour with Hitler (with the exception of Oskar's middle brother, August Wilhelm), it became evident that there would be no restoration of the monarchy through the Nazis.

With the early battlefield deaths of Oskar's son (also named Oskar, killed in Poland, September 1939) and his nephew (Wilhelm, son of the Crown Prince, died of wounds received in France, May 1940) the German people harboured a newfound sentiment for the royal family amidst the totalitarian regime that was Nazi Germany. As a consequence, the majority of royals serving in the German Armed Forces appear to have had their commissions canceled, including Prinz Oskar.

=== Master of Knights, Protestant Order of Saint John ===
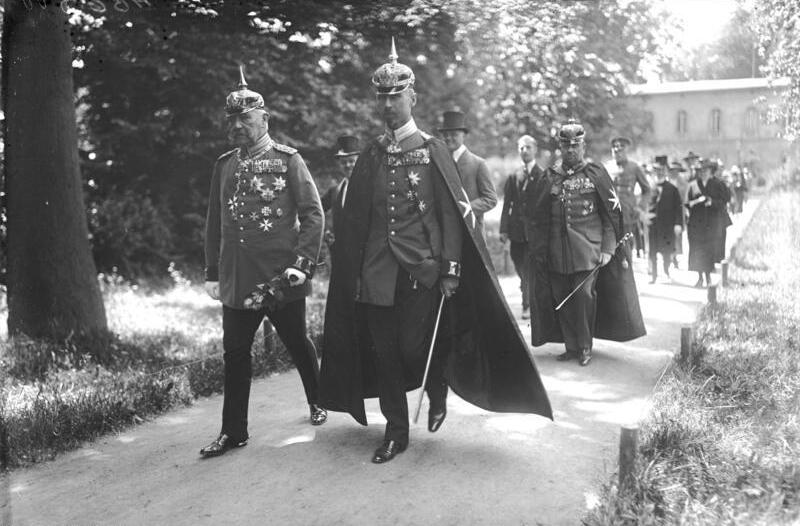
Prinz Oskar (center) and Paul von Hindenburg (left to Prince Oskar) in procession with the Johanniterorden, 1924

The Johanniterorden (The Order of Saint John (Bailiwick of Brandenburg)) was a favourite of the Hohenzollerns, historically, and of Prince Oskar's immediate family specifically. His father and uncle were members, and his brother, Eitel Friedrich, served as its Master of Knights (Herrenmeister), from 1907 to 1926. Prinz Oskar served as the thirty-fifth Master of Knights from Eitel Friedrich's resignation in 1926 until his death in 1958. Modern historians credit Prinz Oskar for saving the ancient order from oblivion during the cultural purges of the Nazi regime. It is from this struggle that he held his anti-Nazi sentiments. After his death in 1958, his youngest son, Prinz Wilhelm Karl, became his permanent successor. Prinz Oskar's grandson, to whom he is namesake, Dr. Oskar Hohenzollern, is the current (thirty-seventh) Master of Knights.

=== Marriage and issue ===
Prinz Oskar was married on 31 July 1914 to Countess Ina-Marie Helene Adele Elise von Bassewitz (27 January 1888 – 17 September 1973). On 27 July 1914, prior to the wedding, Ina Marie was granted the title "Countess von Ruppin". Both the civil and religious ceremonies took place at Schloß Bellevue near Berlin, Prussia. Initially the union was a morganatic marriage, but on 3 November 1919 was decreed to be dynastic in accordance with the house laws of the Royal House of Hohenzollern. Henceforth, from 21 June 1920, his wife was titled "Princess of Prussia" with the style Royal Highness. The couple had four children:

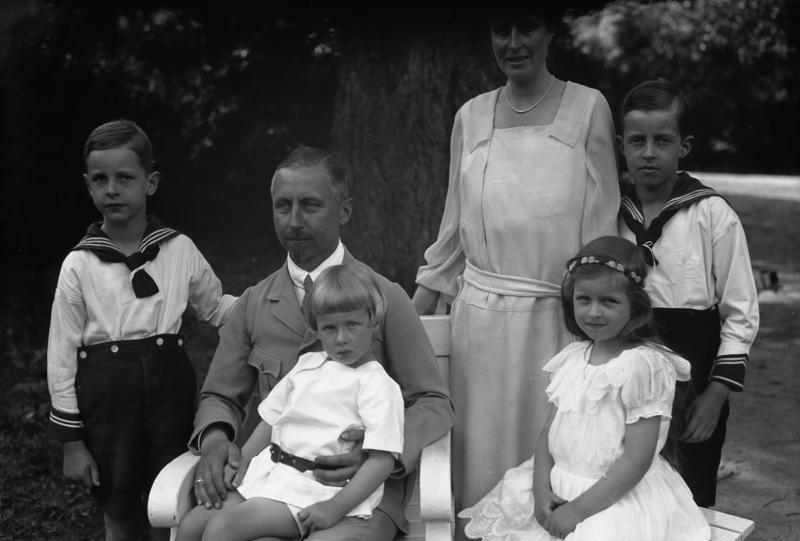
Prince Oskar and Princess Ina Marie with their children in 1925.

- Prince Oskar Wilhelm Karl Hans Kuno of Prussia (12 July 1915 Potsdam – 5 September 1939 Poland); died in World War II. Died unmarried without issue.
- Prince Burchard Friedrich Max Werner Georg of Prussia (8 January 1917 – 12 August 1988), married Countess Eleonore Fugger von Babenhausen on 30 January 1961, no issue.
- Princess Herzeleide Ina Marie Sophie Charlotte Else of Prussia (25 December 1918 – 22 March 1989), married Karl, Prince Biron von Kurland on 15 August 1938, with issue.
- Prince Wilhelm-Karl Adalbert Erich Detloff of Prussia (20 January 1922 – 9 April 2007), married Armgard Else Helene von Veltheim on 1 March 1952, with issue.

=== Death ===
Prince Oskar, whose health declined during the final years of his life, died of stomach cancer in a clinic in Munich on 27 January 1958, on his wife's 70th birthday and what would have been his father's 99th birthday. He was the last surviving son of Wilhelm II.

== Regimental commissions ==
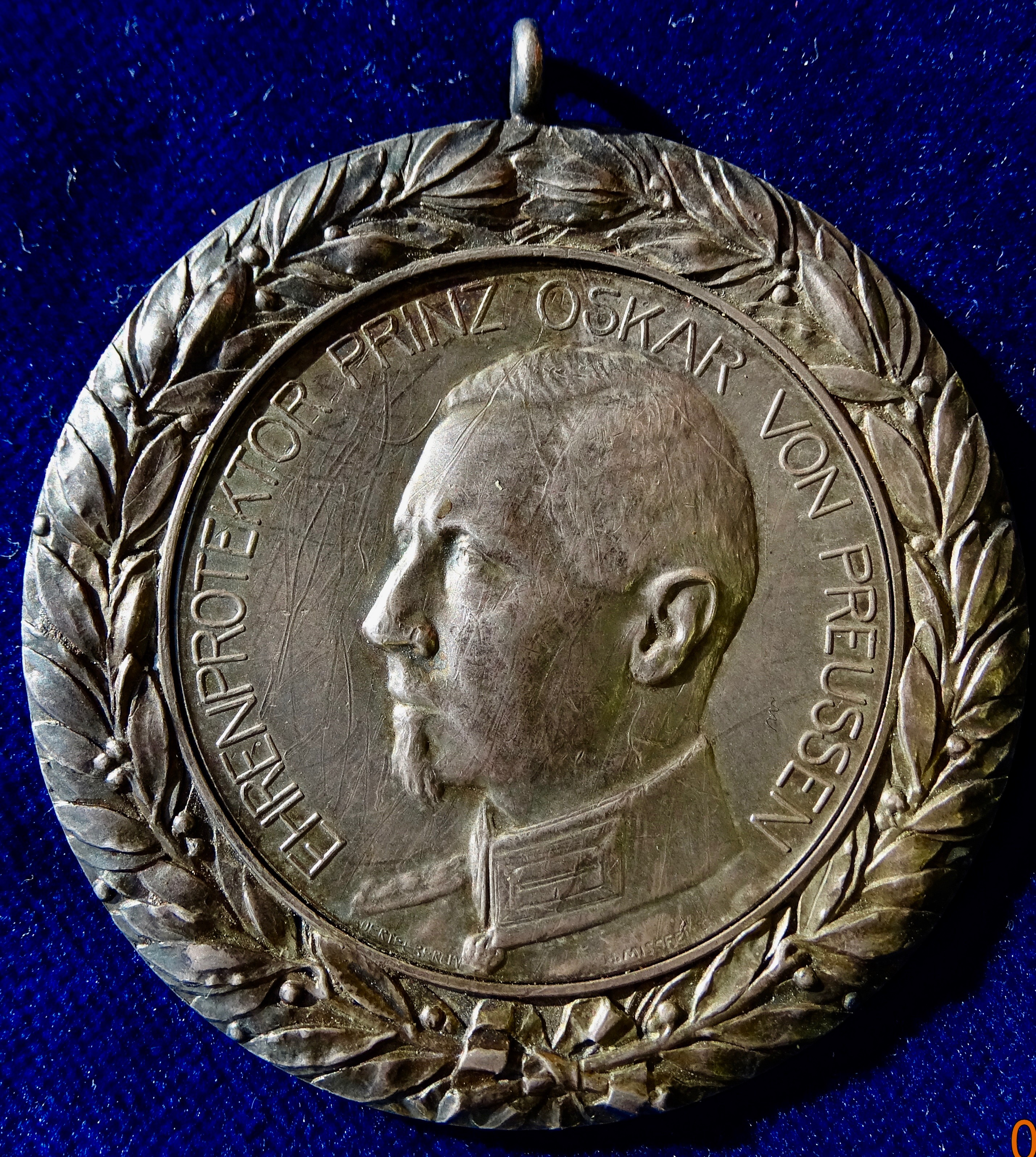
Oskar von Preussen 1930 on a medal of the sculptor Heinrich Missfeldt

1. Garderegiment zu Fuß (1st Regiment of Foot Guards), Leutnant from 1898, Hauptman (captain) through 1914.
2. Grenadierregiment "Konig Wilhelm I." (2. Westpreussisches) Nr. 7, à la suite before 1908, Oberst (colonel) during World War I.
3. Gardegrenadierlandwehrregiment (3rd Reserve Regiment of Grenadier Guards), à la suite before 1908.

== Honours ==
He received the following orders and decorations:

- Baden:
  - Knight of the House Order of Fidelity, 1908
  - War Merit Cross
- Brunswick: War Merit Cross
- Duchy of Anhalt: Friedrich Cross
- Grand Duchy of Hesse: Grand Cross of the Ludwig Order, 27 January 1910
- Hamburg: Hanseatic Cross
- (Hohenzollern-Sigmaringen) Hohenzollern: Cross of Honour of the Princely House Order of Hohenzollern, 1st Class
- Kingdom of Bavaria:
  - Knight of St. Hubert, 1913
  - Officer of the Military Merit Order, with Crown
- Kingdom of Prussia:
  - Grand Commander's Cross of the Royal House Order of Hohenzollern, 27 May 1898; with Swords
  - Grand Cross of the Red Eagle, with Crown, 27 May 1898
  - Iron Cross (1914), 2nd Class, 22 August 1914 (Virton); 1st Class, 24 September 1914 (Verdun)
  - Knight of the Black Eagle, 27 May 1898; with Collar
  - Knight of the Royal Crown Order, 1st Class, 27 May 1898
  - Master of Knights of the Johanniter Order, 1926–1958
  - Wound Badge, September 1914 (Virton); 7 February 1916 (Russian Front)
- Lippe-Detmold: War Merit Cross
- Mecklenburg:
  - Bronze Merit Medal (Schwerin)
  - Cross for Distinction in War, 2nd Class (Strelitz)
  - Grand Cross of the Wendish Crown, with Crown in Ore
- Netherlands: Grand Cross of the Netherlands Lion
- Ottoman Empire: Order of Osmanieh, 1st Class in Diamonds
- Sweden: Knight of the Seraphim, 23 February 1906
- United Kingdom: Honorary Grand Cross of the Royal Victorian Order, 1 July 1904

== Ancestry ==
Ancestors of Prince Oskar of Prussia

8. William I, German Emperor
4. Frederick III, German Emperor
9. Princess Augusta of Saxe-Weimar-Eisenach
2. Wilhelm II, German Emperor
10. Prince Albert of Saxe-Coburg and Gotha
5. Victoria, Princess Royal
11. Victoria, Queen of the United Kingdom
1. Prince Oskar of Prussia
12. Christian August II, Duke of Schleswig-Holstein-Sonderburg-Augustenburg
6. Frederick VIII, Duke of Schleswig-Holstein
13. Countess Louise Sophie af Danneskiold-Samsøe
3. Princess Augusta Victoria of Schleswig-Holstein-Sonderburg-Augustenburg
14. Ernst I, Prince of Hohenlohe-Langenburg
7. Princess Adelheid of Hohenlohe-Langenburg
15. Princess Feodora of Leiningen

Prince Oskar of Prussia House of Hohenzollern Born: 27 July 1888 Died: 27 January 1958
Preceded by Eitel Friedrich, Prinz von Preußen	Herrenmeister (Grand Master) of the Order of Saint John; 1927–1958	Succeeded by Wilhelm Karl, Prinz von Preußen
