= August Wilhelm of Prussia =

August Wilhelm of Prussia may refer to:

- Prince August Wilhelm of Prussia (1887–1949)
- August Wilhelm, Prince of Prussia (1722–1758)
