= Order of Saint John in Sweden =

Protestant chivalric order

- Coat of arms of the Order, crossing Sweden's with the Maltese cross.
- Type: Chivalric Order
- Country: Sweden
- Religious affiliation: Evangelical Lutheranism
- Motto: Pro Fide – Pro Utilitate Hominum (By faith – for the good of men)
- Awarded for: eligible nobility
- Ribbon of the order

The Order of Saint John in Sweden (Swedish: (S:t) Johanniterorden i Sverige [ˈsǎŋkt ʝʊhanˈîːterˌoːɖɛn ˈiː ˈsvæ̌rʝɛ]) (Note: Also known and recorded as the Johanniter Orden, (Order of) St John in Sweden, St. John's in Sweden and St. John of Sweden, among other minor variants. (See Liturgical calendar (Lutheran)#Saints in the liturgical calendar.)) is a Protestant chivalric order. It is a member of the Alliance of the Orders of Saint John of Jerusalem.

It was founded in 1920 in Stockholm, Sweden, as an affiliate of the Evangelical-Lutheran Bailiwick of Brandenburg of Germany. In November 1946, it was granted a Royal Charter by King Gustaf V as the Johanniterorden i Sverige. King Carl XVI Gustaf is the current High Patron, and Queen Silvia is the First Honorary Member of the Order.

Medals, honors, and other ceremonial decorations from the Order are officially open to all citizens; however, they are currently only awarded to members of the House of Nobility, making it a de facto noble order.

== Gallery ==
Ceremonial clothes for Knights of the Order, dating c. early 1900s:
