= Order of Saint John (Bailiwick of Brandenburg) =

German Protestant branch of the Knights Hospitaller

- Flag of the Order
- Type: Order of chivalry
- Established: c. 1099; dissolved/ suspended 1812; restored 1852
- Religious affiliation: Protestant Christianity
- Ribbon: Black moiré
- Herrenmeister: Prince Oscar of Prussia
- Classes: Commander; Knight of Justice; Knight of Honour
- Ribbon bar of the Order

The Bailiwick of Brandenburg of the Chivalric Order of Saint John of the Hospital at Jerusalem (German: Balley Brandenburg des Ritterlichen Ordens Sankt Johannis vom Spital zu Jerusalem), commonly known as the Order of Saint John or the Johanniter Order (German: Johanniterorden), is the German Protestant branch of the Knights Hospitaller, the oldest surviving chivalric order, which generally is considered to have been founded at Jerusalem in 1099.

The Order is led by its thirty-seventh Herrenmeister ("Master of the Knights" or Grand Master), Oskar Prince of Prussia. Each of its knights, about four thousand men worldwide, is either a Knight of Justice (Rechtsritter) or a Knight of Honour (Ehrenritter). Membership in the Order is by appointment only, and individuals may not petition for admission; it is not limited to German citizens or German speakers, and knights include citizens and residents of numerous countries. Its knights largely follow the Evangelical-Lutheran denomination of Christianity. Although membership is no longer limited to the nobility, as it was until 1948, the majority of knights still are drawn from this class. The Order comprises seventeen commanderies in Germany, one each in Austria, Finland, France, Hungary, and Switzerland, and a global commandery with subcommanderies in twelve other countries (Australia, Belgium, Canada, Colombia, Denmark, Italy, Namibia, Poland, South Africa, the United Kingdom, the United States, and Venezuela).

In 1920 and 1946, the Swedish branch and Dutch branch of the Order of Saint John, respectively, became autonomous. Together with the London-based Most Venerable Order of the Hospital of Saint John of Jerusalem (of which the British monarch is Sovereign Head), the Swedish Johanniterorden i Sverige, and the Dutch Johanniter Orde in Nederland, the Order is a member of the Alliance of the Orders of Saint John of Jerusalem. Along with the Roman Catholic Sovereign Military Order of Malta (SMOM), these four "Alliance Orders" represent the legitimate heirs of the Knights Hospitaller. They consider other orders using the name of Saint John to be merely imitative, and the Alliance and the SMOM jointly formed a False Orders Committee (renamed and reorganised as the Committee on Orders of Saint John), with representatives of each of the five orders, to expose and take action against such imitations.

The Order and its affiliate orders in the Netherlands and Sweden, which became independent of the Bailiwick of Brandenburg in 1946, after the Second World War, are Protestant. The SMOM, headquartered in Rome, admits only men and women of the Roman Catholic faith. The Venerable Order of Saint John, a recreation of the medieval English Langue of the Order of Saint John, was chiefly Anglican at its formation in the nineteenth century but since has opened its membership to men and women of any faith, though only Christians may serve as Great Officers.

== History ==
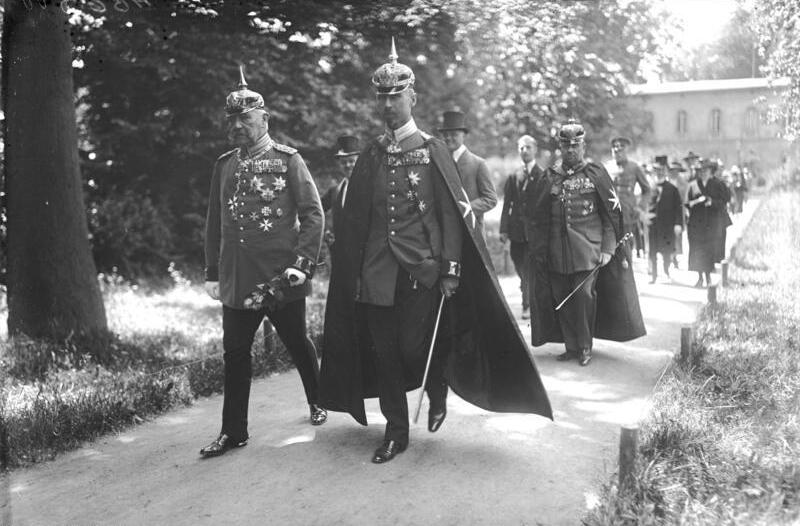
Prince Oskar of Prussia leading a procession of the Johanniterorden in 1924

=== Appearance in German-speaking lands ===
Soon after the formation of the Order in Jerusalem, supporters in Western Europe began to donate farmland and other assets for the objectives of the order, the military protection and medical aid of Christian pilgrims to the Holy Land. In time, these landholdings were gathered into regional administrative divisions known as commanderies, each headed by a senior knight, or knight commander of the Order. The first commandery in the Germanies was founded in the mid-twelfth century.

By 1318, the Bailiwick of Brandenburg had been established in the northeastern parts of the Holy Roman Empire, an aggregation of commanderies of the Order under a bailiff, a high officer of the Order. The riches and influence of the Bailiwick (especially after augmentation by properties of the suppressed Order of the Temple) were so sizeable that, in 1382, the Prior of the German Langue (the eight territorial "Tongues" of the mediaeval Order of Saint John were its major subdivisions) in what became known as the Accord of Heimbach recognized the right of the Bailiwick of Brandenburg to choose its own governor (the Bailiff of Brandenburg, more commonly called the Herrenmeister) and preceptors (the commanders of the commanderies constituting the Bailiwick).

=== Early modern Europe ===
During the Protestant Reformation, large parts of the German Langue of the then-undivided Order of Saint John followed the leadership of the Bailiwick of Brandenburg and accepted Lutheran theology while continuing to recognize the headship of the grand master of the Order, who, with the majority of the knights, remained Roman Catholic. The higher officials of the Order, now headquartered on the Mediterranean island of Malta after the successive losses of Jerusalem, Acre, and Rhodes to Muslim Arabs and Turks, evinced a desire to maintain a relationship with the Protestant knights despite the theological and ecclesiological differences between the two groups. But in 1581, then Grand Master Jean de la Cassière called Herrenmeister Martin von Hohenstein before the Chapter (ruling council) of the Order of Saint John in Malta; when the Herrenmeister did not appear, De la Cassière declared the expulsion of the knights of the Bailiwick from the order, though he did so without the agreement of the Chapter.

Though separated from the Roman Catholic main stem of the Order of Saint John, the Bailiwick of Brandenburg continued to flourish. Admitting only noblemen, principally from the Germanies, the Bailiwick maintained hospitals and other institutions to care for the poor, the sick, and the injured. Elections of successive Herrenmeister (including a Roman Catholic, Adam von Schwarzenberg, in 1641) were announced to the Grand Prior of Germany in the Roman Catholic Order of Malta and, in accordance with the requests from the governing authorities of the Order of Malta, responsions (periodic remittances from revenues) were paid to the Grand Priory.

The horrific Thirty Years' War devastated the Bailiwick, resulting in the deaths of many knights and the destruction of much of the wealth of the Bailiwick. By the terms of the Peace of Westphalia ending the conflict, the Bailiwick was effectively placed under the protection of the Prince Electors of Brandenburg, later Kings of Prussia, members of the House of Hohenzollern. Under this protection, the Johanniterorden, as the Order came to be known, came to be headquartered at Sonnenburg Castle in the Neumark of Brandenburg, east of the Oder River, though the Herrenmeister resided in the Ordenspalais in Berlin from its completion in 1738.

As the intense sectarianism of early modern Europe gave way to the Enlightenment, further if sporadic attempts were made to accommodate the Protestant Bailiwick within the Roman Catholic Order of Malta. Despite cordial relations, however, including payment of responsions to Malta and participation of delegates from the Bailiwick in the Chapter General of the Order of Malta in 1776, nominal reunion of the two orders was prevented by the withholding of papal approval.

=== The nineteenth century and thereafter ===
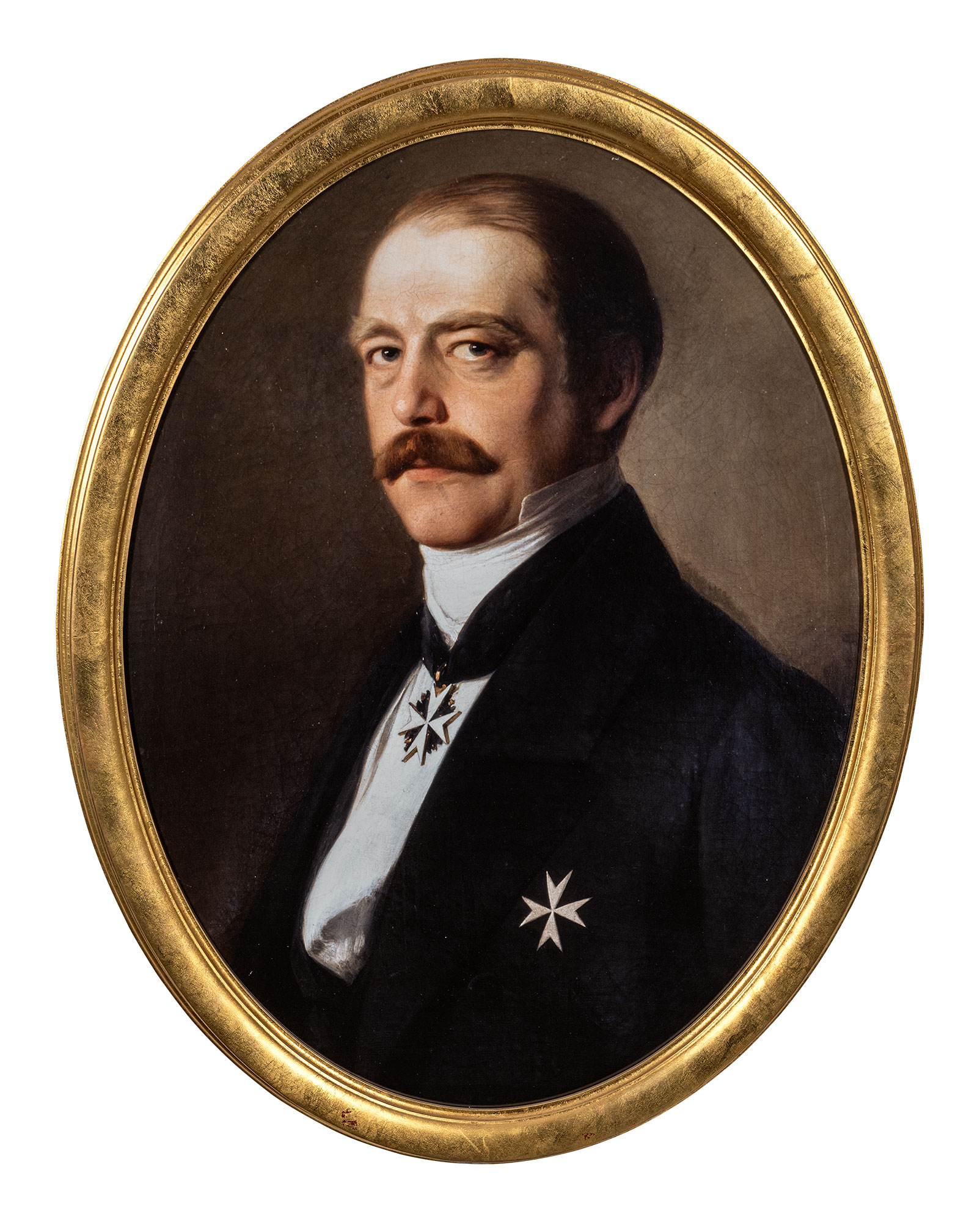
Otto von Bismarck wearing neck and breast crosses of a Knight of Honor, circa 1862

In 1811 and 1812, as protector of the Order, King Frederick William III of Prussia transferred the powers of the Herrenmeister and the Chapter (the governing council of the Order) to the Prussian Crown, effectively dissolving the Bailiwick and confiscating its possessions. In its place he established a similarly named order of merit, the Royal Prussian Order of Saint John which also had similar insignia. The Herrenmeister of the Bailiwick, Prince August Ferdinand, became the first grand master of the new order of merit and continued to reside in the Ordenspalais, the palace of the Bailiwick of Brandenburg. All knights of the Bailiwick became members of the new order of merit.

In 1852 the order of merit was in its turn dissolved and King Frederick William IV of Prussia, again exercising the powers of the kings of Prussia as protectors of the Order, restored the original Bailiwick. The eight surviving knights of justice of the original Order were among its first members. In 1853, they elected the younger brother of the Prussian king, Prince Friedrich Karl Alexander, the new Herrenmeister of the restored Order. He announced his election to the head of the Order of Malta, who in acknowledgement recognized this restoration as the continuation of the historic Bailiwick. The Johanniterorden and its branches became fully independent of the Roman Catholic grand master in Rome, although the Herrenmeisters then and since have continuously and explicitly recognized the Order's historical connection with the Roman Catholic Order of Malta.

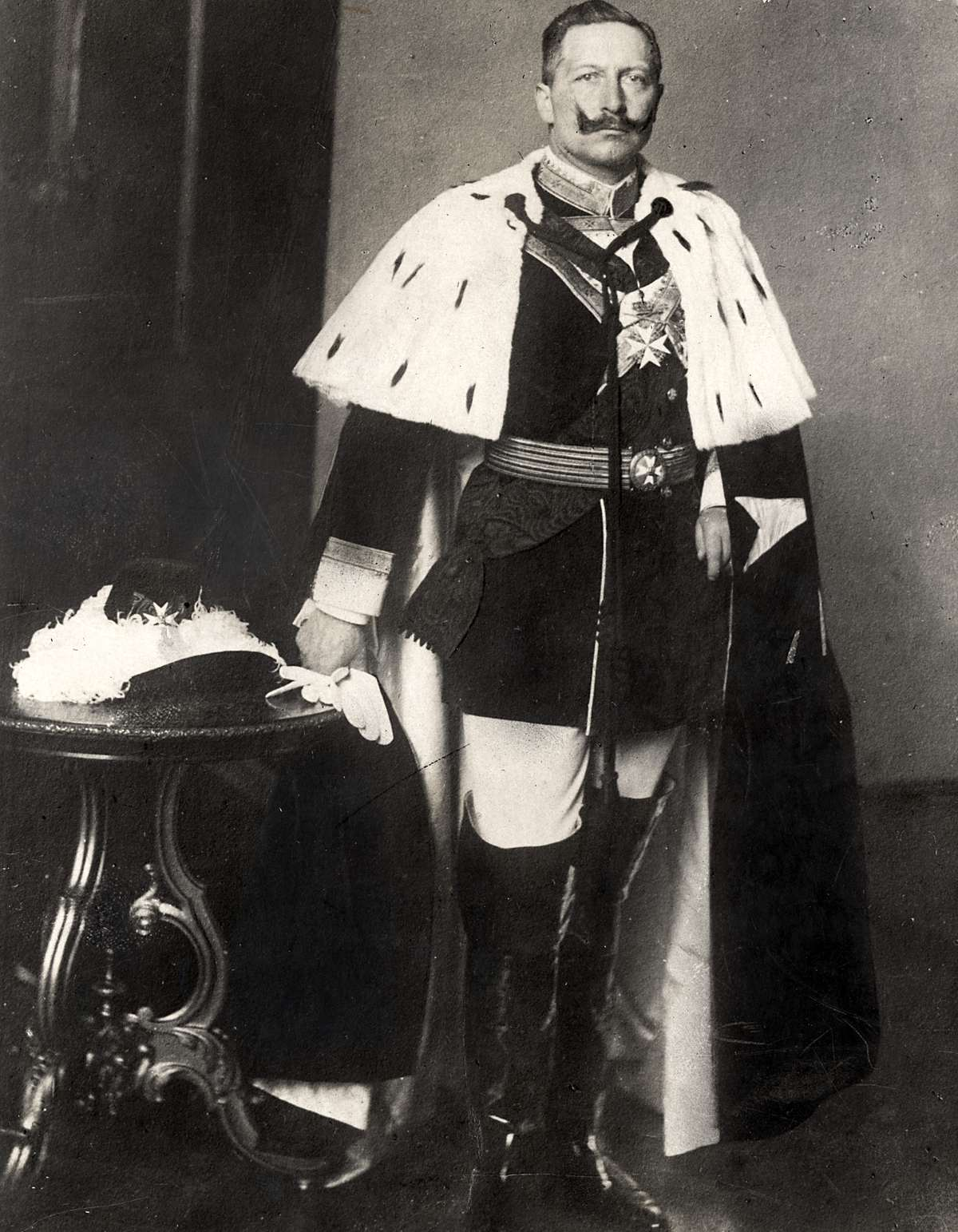
German Emperor William II in ceremonial robes as Protector of the Order of Saint John

During the course of the nineteenth and twentieth centuries, the Order created and supported more and more charitable activities. It now owns and operates numerous hospitals, ambulance services, old-age homes, and nurseries and provides first-aid training courses and disaster relief, both within Germany and abroad.

After World War II, with the Neumark given by the victorious Allies to Poland (Sonnenburg has been renamed "Słońsk", and the castle lies in ruins), the Order moved its headquarters to Bonn, West Germany. After the reunification of West and East Germany, the headquarters were moved again, to Berlin.

More than the location of the seat of the Order changed in the aftermath of the Second World War. The Swedish and Dutch commanderies separated from the direct oversight of the Bailiwick (though continuing in loose association with it through the Alliance since 1961) in 1946, and two years later, the Bailiwick itself began to admit commoners as knights, because the post-monarchical German nobility was seen as a "frozen caste". The Finnish commandery, however, remains a purely noble society, as do the now independent Swedish and Dutch orders.

Although the Herrenmeister is now elected and no is longer nominated by the king of Prussia or emperor of Germany, each holder of the office since 1693 has been a member of the House of Hohenzollern, the family of the former Prussian kings and last German emperors.

The present status of the Order under German law derives from its incorporation in 1852, and from official recognition by the German government in 1957 and 1959 of the badges of rank in the Order as German decorations of merit.

== Organisation ==
=== Ranks ===
There are three active classes in the Order: Commander (Kommendator), Knight of Justice (Rechtsritter), and Knight of Honour (Ehrenritter). There are also classes of Honorary Commander (Ehrenkommendator), given to Knights of Justice who have rendered distinguished service to the Order, and Honorary Member (Ehrenmitglieder), which can be bestowed on men (including non-evangelical Christians) who do not belong to the Order but have given it some extraordinary service.

== Charitable works ==
Through its Johanniter-Unfall-Hilfe ("Saint John Accident Assistance"), its hospitals, nursing homes, hospices, and other institutions, the Order today is a major provider of medical and rescue services in Germany and, to a lesser extent, of comparable services elsewhere in Europe, Africa, and the Americas. These services are similar to the St. John Ambulance in many Commonwealth nations, and to various organisations affiliated with the Sovereign Military Order of Malta. All are carried out under the auspices of the Christian faith.

Additionally, spiritual retreats and other activities of the Order concentrate on the spiritual formation and development of Christian citizens in the modern world.

== Insignia ==
Cloak of a Knight of Justice worn over the now obsolescent dress uniform of the Order

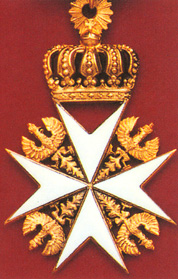
The cross of a Knight of Justice.

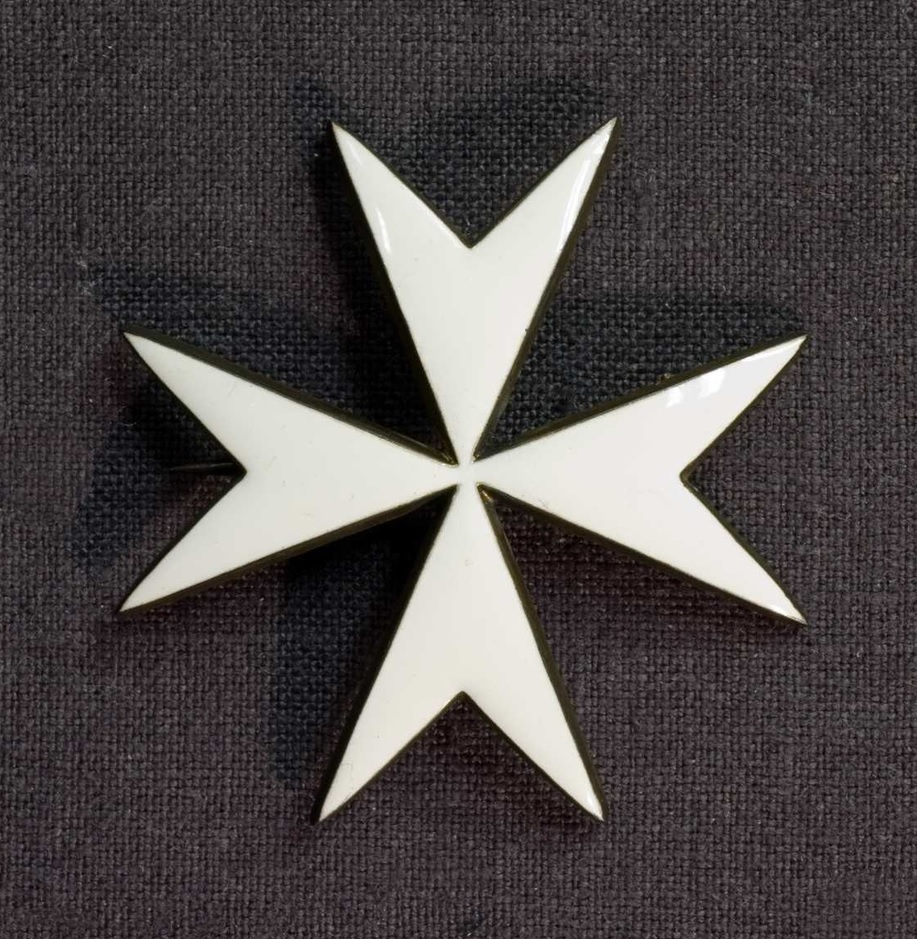
Star or breast badge of the Order, which is worn on the left jacket breast.

The cloak of the Order is plain black with a large, white, linen eight-pointed cross on the left breast. For most knights, the cloak is black woollen (to which French knights add distinctive white woollen collars) with a plain lining, but the Herrenmeister’s cloak is of black velvet lined in satin. The cloaks of most knights are closed only at the neck, but the Herrenmeister, Commanders, Honorary Commanders, and Knights of Justice also wear a long black cord called a cingulum.

The insignia, also known as crosses of honor, are no longer bestowed by the Order automatically (reception into the Order now involves only ceremonial robing with the cloak in a church service). Knights of Honor must now have rendered five years of service to the Order before a cross of honor is granted. Promotion to Knight of Justice requires at least seven years of distinguished service.

The basic insignia of the Order is a white-enamelled Maltese cross. The crowned Brandenburg (later, Prussian) eagles between the arms of the crosses date from 1668; they are gold for Knights of Justice, Honorary Commanders, Commanders, and the Herrenmeister, but, on the crosses of Knights of Honour and Honorary Members, the eagles are enamelled black with only the tiny crowns on each eagle's head left unenamelled gold. The closed crown of the king of Prussia on the Herrenmeister's cross and the crosses of Commanders, Honorary Commanders, Knights of Justice, and Honorary Members dates from the time of Frederick the Great, when his government authorised it to be used on the insignia. Excluding the crown, the cross of a Knight of Justice is 5 cm in diameter; the cross of a Commander, Honorary Commander, or Honorary Member, 5.5 cm; and the cross of the Herrenmeister, 7 cm The uncrowned cross of a Knight of Honour is 6 cm in diameter. Each cross is worn from a black-moire, 4.5-centimeter-wide ribbon worn about the neck.

All members of the Order may also wear a plain, Maltese cross as a star or 'breast badge'. Most such stars are of plain linen, though enamelled stars in either silver or silver gilt, of about 5.5cm in diameter, also are worn in formal evening attire.

A white-enamelled Maltese cross in either gold (generally about 1.8 centimeters in diameter) or silver (1.3), may be worn on the left lapel of a knight's suit coat or sportcoat.

From the late eighteenth century, the Johanniter have had a uniform similar to the Knights of Malta. Though not abolished, this uniform has not been worn since before the Second World War.

== Related orders ==
In 1946, the Dutch and Swedish commanderies of the Order separated from the direct oversight of the Bailiwick to form distinct, though related, orders.

=== Order of Saint John in the Netherlands ===
The mediaeval Dutch Bailiwick of Utrecht and Commandery of Haarlem formed parts of the German Langue (one of the "Tongues", the major divisions of the mediaeval Order of Saint John) until, during the Reformation, they associated themselves with the reformed Bailiwick of Brandenburg. Both the Bailiwick of Utrecht and the Commandery of Haarlem were suppressed in 1810, during the Napoleonic occupation.

Dutch knights of the Bailiwick of Brandenburg formed their own commandery within the Johanniterorden in 1909, when the Dutch monarch afforded it royal protection; and the commandery separated from the German Johanniterorden in 1946. The commandery became an independent order in 1958 and is known as Johanniter Orde in Nederland, now admitting noblewomen as well as noblemen. The Dutch monarch is an honorary commander. With the German and Swedish orders, the Dutch order helped found the Alliance of the Orders of St. John of Jerusalem on June 13, 1961.

Dutch insignia of the Johanniter Orde in Nederland replace Prussian eagles with the Dutch lion.

=== Order of Saint John in Sweden ===
A Swedish commandery of the Order of Saint John had been established by 1185, but laicized in 1530 as a result of the Reformation. Some Swedish noblemen had become knights of the Johanniterorden by the early nineteenth century; by 1920, when King Gustav V placed them under his protection as a union of Swedish knights of the Order, they were 54 in number.

In 1946, the union of Swedish knights separated from the German Johanniterorden and a Swedish order was established. Known as the Johanniterorden i Sverige, and with the Swedish monarch as its High Protector, it helped found the Alliance of the Orders of St. John of Jerusalem on June 13, 1961. Even though it is still a semi-official chivalric order of the Swedish state, membership of the Swedish order in practice remains limited to noblemen.

Swedish insignia of the Johanniterorden i Sverige replace Prussian eagles with the sheaf of the House of Vasa.

== Herrenmeister ==
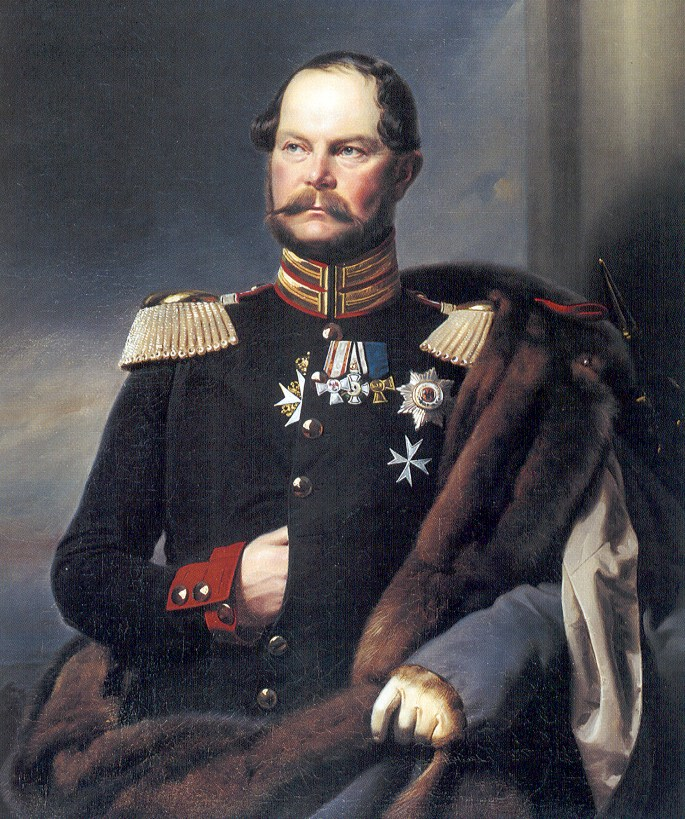
Prince Friedrich Carl Alexander, Herrenmeister from 1853 to 1883, wearing the breast cross of a Knight and the neck cross of his office

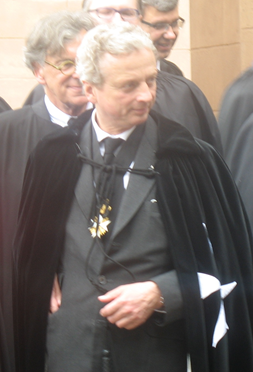
Prince Oskar of Prussia, Herrenmeister since 1999

Following is a list of the men who have headed the Order, with the title of Herrenmeister, from the beginning of the institution as a subdivision of the Knights Hospitaller.

- 1323–1336: Gebhard von Bortefelde (praeceptor generalis), considered the first Herrenmeister
- 1341–1371: Hermann von Wereberge
- 1371–1397: Bernhard von der Schulenburg
- 1397–1399: Detlev von Walmede
- 1399–1418: Reimar von Güntersberg
- 1419–1426: Busso von Alvensleben
- 1426–1437: Balthasar von Schlieben
- 1437–1459: Nicolaus von Thierbach
- 1459–1460: Heinrich von Redern
- 1460–1471: Liborius von Schlieben
- 1471–1474: Kaspar von Güntersberg
- 1474–1491: Richard von der Schulenburg
- 1491–1526: Georg von Schlabrendorff
- 1527–1544: Veit von Thümen
- 1544–1545: Joachim von Arnim
- 1545–1564: Thomas von Runge
- 1564–1569: Franz von Naumann
- 1569–1609: Martin, Graf von Hohenstein
- 1610–1611: Friedrich, Markgraf zu Brandenburg
- 1611–1613: Ernst, Markgraf zu Brandenburg
- 1614–1615: Georg Albrecht, Markgraf zu Brandenburg
- 1616–1624: Johann Georg, Markgraf zu Brandenburg
- 1624–1625: Joachim Sigismund, Markgraf zu Brandenburg
- 1625–1641: Adam, Graf von Schwarzenberg
- 1641–1652: Georg von Winterfeld, Landvogt der Neumark, Komtur zu Schivelbein
- 1652–1679: Johann Moritz, Fürst von Nassau-Siegen
- 1689–1692: Georg Friedrich, Fürst zu Waldeck, Graf zu Pyrmont
- 1693–1695: Karl Philipp, Markgraf zu Brandenburg-Schwedt
- 1696–1731: Albrecht Friedrich, Prinz in Preußen, Markgraf zu Brandenburg-Schwedt
- 1731–1762: Karl, Prinz in Preußen, Markgraf zu Brandenburg-Schwedt
- 1762–1812: August Ferdinand, Prinz von Preußen
- 1853–1883: Friedrich Carl Alexander, Prinz von Preußen
- 1883–1906: Albrecht, Prinz von Preußen
- 1907–1926: Eitel Friedrich, Prinz von Preußen
- 1927–1958: Oskar, Prinz von Preußen
- 1958–1999: Wilhelm Karl, Prinz von Preußen
- 1999–present: Oskar, Prinz von Preußen

== Notable members ==
=== Commanders ===
- Prince Albert of Prussia (1837–1906)
- Alexis, Prince of Bentheim and Steinfurt
- Prince Friedrich Karl of Prussia (1828–1885)
- Otto von Bismarck
- Karl Eberhard Herwarth von Bittenfeld
- Frederick Francis II, Grand Duke of Mecklenburg-Schwerin
- Frederick Francis IV, Grand Duke of Mecklenburg-Schwerin
- Prince Frederick of the Netherlands
- Hermann, Prince of Hohenlohe-Langenburg
- Julius, Count of Lippe-Biesterfeld
- Helmuth von Maltzahn
- Otto Theodor von Manteuffel
- Helmuth von Moltke the Elder
- Emil von Schlitz
- Karl von Schlitz
- Wilhelm von Wedell-Piesdorf
- Otto Graf zu Stolberg-Wernigerode
- Remus von Woyrsch
- Friedrich Graf von Wrangel

=== Knights of Justice ===
- Adolphus Frederick V, Grand Duke of Mecklenburg-Strelitz
- Adolf von Bonin
- Bernhard von Bülow
- Bruno, Prince of Ysenburg and Büdingen
- Charles of Solms-Hohensolms-Lich
- Karl von Einem
- Ludwig von Falkenhausen
- Frederick Francis III, Grand Duke of Mecklenburg-Schwerin
- Heinrich VII, Prince Reuss of Köstritz
- Heinrich von Gossler
- Guido Henckel von Donnersmarck
- Prince Henry of Prussia (1862–1929)
- Hermann, Prince of Solms-Hohensolms-Lich
- Theodor von Holleben
- Dietrich von Hülsen-Haeseler
- Georg von Kameke
- Adolf von Glümer
- Günther von Kirchbach
- Hugo von Kirchbach
- Peter Kurrild-Klitgaard
- Alexander von Linsingen
- Moriz von Lyncker
- Georg von der Marwitz
- Ernst von Prittwitz und Gaffron
- Maximilian von Prittwitz
- Wichard von Alvensleben
- Ferdinand von Quast
- Gustav Waldemar von Rauch
- Albrecht von Roon
- Prince Albert of Saxe-Altenburg
- Gustav von Senden-Bibran
- Eberhard Graf von Schmettow
- Wilhelm von Tümpling
- Konstantin Bernhard von Voigts-Rhetz
- Karl von Wedel
- Alfred von Waldersee
- William, Prince of Wied
- Karl von Wrangel
- Duke Nicholas of Württemberg
- Duke William of Württemberg
- Ferdinand von Zeppelin

=== Knights of Honour ===
- Vladimir Fyodorovich Adlerberg
- Duke Adolf Friedrich of Mecklenburg
- Alexander Frederick, Landgrave of Hesse
- Alexander of Battenberg
- Aleksandr Baryatinsky
- Friedrich Ferdinand von Beust
- Friedrich Wilhelm von Bismarck
- Julius von Bose
- Georg, Prince of Schaumburg-Lippe
- Ludwig von Bogdandy
- Konrad von Burgsdorff
- Hans von Bülow
- Charles Edward, Duke of Saxe-Coburg and Gotha
- Prince Charles of Prussia
- Chlodwig, Landgrave of Hesse-Philippsthal-Barchfeld
- Edward VII
- Emich, Prince of Leiningen
- Ernst I, Duke of Saxe-Altenburg
- Prince Eitel Friedrich of Prussia
- Botho zu Eulenburg
- Friedrich, Prince of Wied
- Friedrich II, Duke of Anhalt
- Friedrich Wilhelm Leopold Konstantin Quirin Freiherr von Forcade de Biaix
- Ludwig von Gablenz
- Karl von der Gröben
- Heinrich LXVII, Prince Reuss Younger Line
- Miklós Horthy
- August von Kleist
- Ludwig Wilhelm, Prince of Bentheim and Steinfurt
- Edwin Freiherr von Manteuffel
- Christoph Johann von Medem
- Gustav Bogislav von Münchow
- Prince Oscar of Prussia (born 1959)
- Prince Oskar of Prussia
- Thorleif Paus
- Dubislav Friedrich von Platen
- Arthur von Posadowsky-Wehner
- Prince Wilhelm-Karl of Prussia
- Hermann, Fürst von Pückler-Muskau
- Philip Riedesel zu Camberg
- Alexander von Schleinitz
- Charles Gonthier, Prince of Schwarzburg-Sondershausen
- Ludwig Freiherr von und zu der Tann-Rathsamhausen
- Victor II, Duke of Ratibor
- August von Werder
- Wilhelm, Prince of Löwenstein-Wertheim-Freudenberg
- William II of Württemberg

=== Honorary Members ===
- Friedrich Sixt von Armin
- Frederick I, Duke of Anhalt
- George Albert, Prince of Schwarzburg-Rudolstadt

== See also ==
- Alliance of the Orders of Saint John of Jerusalem, formed by the Bailiwick, its associated orders, and the Venerable Order of Saint John
- Johanniter International, a network of charities affiliated with the Alliance Orders
- Sovereign Military Order of Malta, based in Rome
- Venerable Order of Saint John, based in London
- Philip Riedesel zu Camberg

== Bibliography ==
- Article on "Johanniterorden" in the German-language Wikipedia.
- Clark, Robert M., Jr., The Evangelical Knights of Saint John: A History of the Bailiwick of Brandenburg of the Knightly Order of St. John of the Hospital at Jerusalem, Known as the Johanniter Order; Dallas, Texas: 2003.
- Freller, Thomas. The German Langue of the Order of Malta: A Concise History; Santa Venera, Malta: Midsea Books Ltd., 2010.
- Herrlich, Carl Hugo. Die Balley Brandenburg des Johanniter-Ordens von ihrem Entstehen bis zur Gegenwart und in ihren jetzigen Einrichtungen; Berlin: Carl Heymanns Verlag, 1904 (fourth edition).
- Hoegen Dijkhof, Hans J. (2006). The Legitimacy of Orders of St. John: a historical and legal analysis and case study of a para-religious phenomenon. Doctoral thesis. Leiden: University of Leiden. ISBN 9065509542.
- De Pierredon, Michel. Histoire Politique de l'Ordre Souverain des Hospitaliers de Saint-Jean de Jérusalem dit de Malte, depuis la chute de Malte jusqu'a nos jours; Paris, 1926.
- Sainty, Guy Stair. The Orders of Saint John: The History, Structure, Membership and Modern Role of the Five Hospitaller Orders of Saint John of Jerusalem; New York: The American Society of the Most Venerable Order of the Hospital of Saint John in Jerusalem, 1991.
- Staehle, Ernst. Geschichte der Johanniter und Malteser; Gnas, Austria: Weishaupt Verlag, 2002 (in four volumes).
- Storm, Robert. "A Brief History of the Bailiwick of Brandenburg of the Chivalric Order of St. John of the Hospital at Jerusalem", in Volume XXVIII, No. 1 (Easter, 2011), of Johanniter Herald (quarterly journal of the North American Subcommanderies of the Balley Brandenburg).
