= Wilhelm Karl Prinz von Preussen =

German politician (1922–2007)

- Born: 30 January 1922; Potsdam, Weimar Republic
- Died: 9 April 2007 (aged 85); Holzminden, Germany
- Burial: 13 April 2007; Bornstedter Friedhof, Potsdam, Germany
- Spouse: Armgard von Veltheim (m. 1952)
- Issue: Donata; Wilhelm-Karl; Oscar
Names
- Wilhelm Karl Adalbert Erich Detloff
- House: Hohenzollern
- Father: Prince Oskar of Prussia
- Mother: Countess Ina Marie von Bassewitz

Wilhelm Karl Adalbert Erich Detloff Prinz von Preussen (30 January 1922 in Potsdam – 9 April 2007 in Holzminden) was the third son of Prince Oskar of Prussia, and the last surviving grandson of Wilhelm II, the last German Emperor. He was the thirty-sixth Master of Knights (Herrenmeister) of the Protestant (and largely German) Order of Saint John (Bailiwick of Brandenburg), also known as Der Johanniterorden, as his father's successor and his son's predecessor.

== Biography ==
Wilhelm-Karl was the youngest of Prince Oskar of Prussia and Countess Ina Marie von Bassewitz's four children. Having been admitted to the Bailiwick of Brandenburg of the Order of Saint John of the hospital at Jerusalem (known unofficially as the Johanniterorden, the Protestant successor of the mediaeval Knights Hospitaller) in 1944, he later succeeded his father as its head, serving as the thirty-sixth Herrenmeister ("Master of the Knights") of the Order from 1958 until 1999. Wilhelm-Karl worked tirelessly to keep the Order intact during the Cold War and helped to reunite its membership after the fall of East Germany.

Amongst other orders and awards, Wilhelm-Karl received the Grand Merit Cross (with star) of the Order of Merit of the Federal Republic of Germany and the Grand Cross of the Order pro merito Melitensi of the Sovereign Military Order of Malta.

== Marriage and issue ==
In 1952, Wilhelm-Karl married Armgard Else Helene von Veltheim (17 February 1926 - 1 November 2019), daughter of Friedrich von Veltheim (1881–1955) and his wife, Ottonie von Alvensleben (1883–1960). The couple had two sons and a daughter:

- Donata-Viktoria Prinzessin von Preussen (24 December 1952 – 25 February 2026) unmarried and without issue.
- Wilhelm-Karl Prinz von Preussen (born 25 August 1955) unmarried and without issue.
- Oskar Prinz von Preussen (born 6 May 1959); historian, succeeded his father as the Master of the Knights of the Johanniterorden, he married in October 1992 Auguste Zimmermann von Siefart (born 16 May 1962), daughter of Ralf Emil Eberhard Jules Henning Zimmermann von Siefart (b. 1925) and Maria Ida Barbara Helene von Frankenberg und Proschlitz (b. 1930). The couple has two sons and a daughter:
  - Oskar Prinz von Preußen (born 1993); he married in April 2024 Johanna Freiin von Jenisch
  - Wilhelmine Prinzessin von Preußen (born 1995); she married in June 2025 Leonard Freiherr von Stenglin
  - Albert Prinz von Preußen (born 1998)

== Published works ==
- Auftrag des Johanniters. Ansprachen und Aufsätze ("Transactions of the Johanniter Knights: Talks and Treatises"); 1983.
- Johanniter und der 20. Juli 1944 ("Johanniter Knights and the Plot of July 20, 1944", written with Lieutenant General Bernd, Baron Freytag von Loringhoven); 1989 (second edition).
- Die Soldaten der Wehrmacht ("The Soldiers of the Wehrmacht", written with Karl-Günther von Hase and Hans Poeppel), 1998 (sixth edition, 2000). (ISBN 3-7766-2057-9)

== Sources ==
This page is a translation of the article in the German language Wikipedia

== Ancestry ==
Ancestors of Wilhelm Karl Prinz von Preussen

8. Frederick III, German Emperor
4. Wilhelm II, German Emperor
9. Victoria, Princess Royal
2. Prince Oskar of Prussia
10. Frederick VIII, Duke of Schleswig-Holstein
5. Princess Augusta Victoria of Schleswig-Holstein-Sonderburg-Augustenburg
11. Princess Adelheid of Hohenlohe-Langenburg
1. Prince Wilhelm Karl of Prussia
12. Count Karl von Bassewitz
6. Count Carl von Bassewitz-Levetzow
13. Ina von Bülow
3. Countess Ina Marie von Bassewitz-Levetzow
14. Count Werner von der Schulenburg
7. Countess Margarete von der Schulenburg
15. Baroness Marie von Maltzahn

Wilhelm Karl Prinz von Preussen House of Hohenzollern Born: 30 January 1922 Died: 9 April 2007
Preceded by Prince Oskar of Prussia	Grand Master of the Imperial and Royal Order of Saint John; 1958–1999	Succeeded by Prince Oscar of Prussia
