= Order of Saint John in the Netherlands =

Chivalric order in the Netherlands

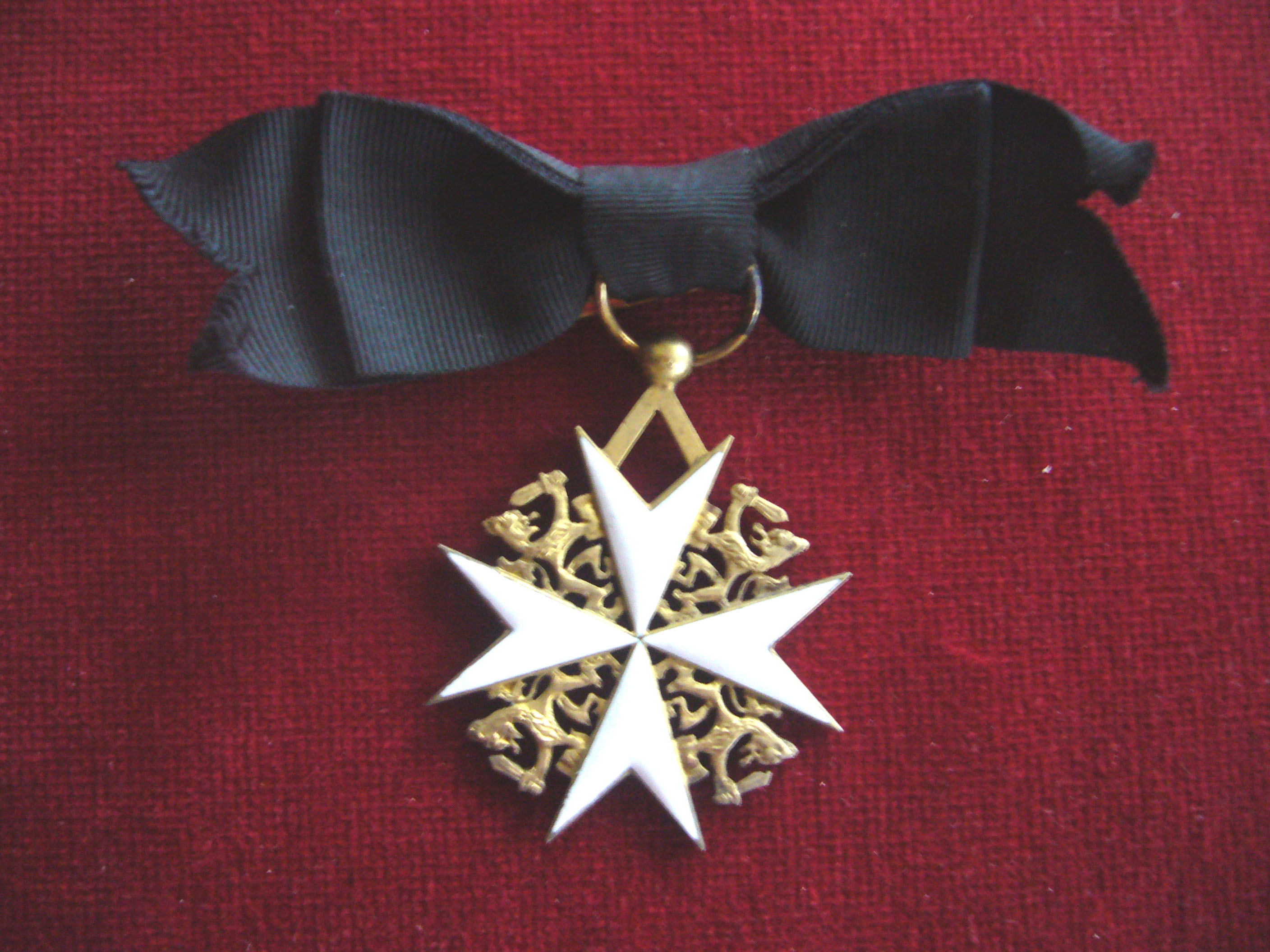
- The Dameskruis (Lady Cross) of the Johanniter Orde
- Type: Chivalric Order
- Country: Netherlands
- Religious affiliation: Protestantism
- Awarded for: eligible nobility
- Grades: Chapter Knight, Knight of Justice, Knight of Honour, Knight-expectant
- Website: https://www.johanniter.nl/
- Ribbon of the order

The Order of Saint John in the Netherlands, also known as the Johanniter Orde, is a Dutch chivalric order and Protestant branch of the Knights Hospitaller. The order was founded in 1909 on the initiative of Prince consort Henry of Mecklenburg-Schwerin as a Dutch branch of the Evangelical-Lutheran Order of Saint John of Prussia under the official name of Commenderij Nederland van de Balije Brandenburg der Johanniter Orde. The name was changed to its current name in 1958. Membership of the order is exclusive to Protestant members of the Dutch nobility.

While the order has its own activities, it most commonly works together with the Red Cross and the Dutch association of the Order of Malta, the Roman Catholic branch of the Knights Hospitaller. The decorations of the order and membership of it are counted among the medals of the Netherlands and may be worn on military uniforms.

== The Chapter of the Order ==
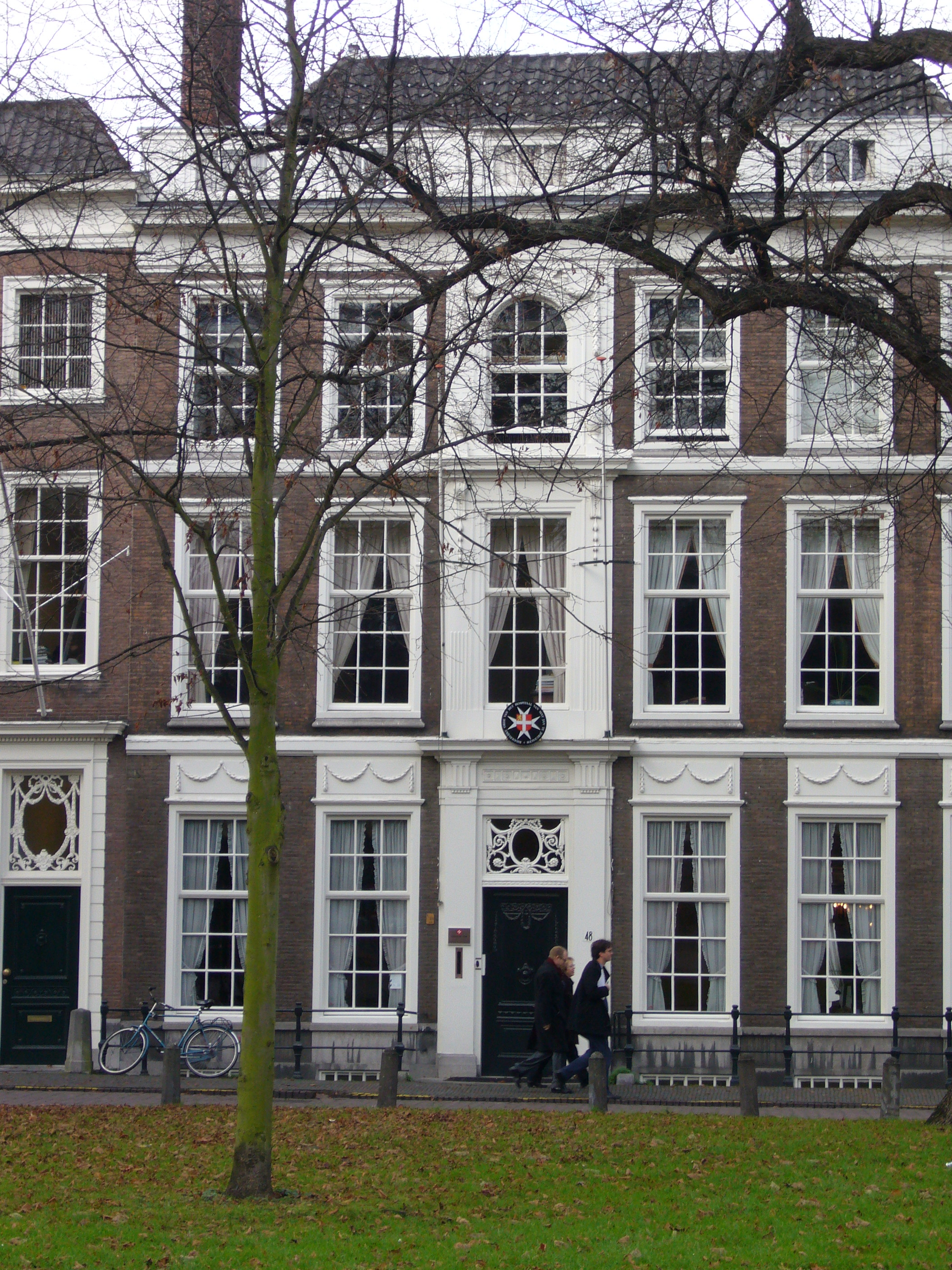
The seat of the Order at Lange Voorhout 48, the Hague

The governing body of the Order of Saint John in the Netherlands is made up of the Chapter consisting of the following members:

- Coadjutor
- Werkmeester and Werkmeesteres (Workmaster and Workmistress)
- Treasurer
- Chancellor
- Chapter knights and ladies

== Members ==
To become a member of the order, one must be knighted in the Dutch nobility, be protestant and be a minimum of 21 years old. If a member reaches the age of 25 they are eligible to be named a knight of honour and if they have been a member of the order for at least 5 years they are eligible to be named as a knight or lady of justice. When the order was founded, only males were eligible for membership. This was changed by royal decree on 3 October 1951, and on 29 February 1952 a female branch was established.

In 2006 the order counted 630 members, most notable of which is King Willem-Alexander.
