= History of the Knights Hospitaller in the Levant =

The history of the Knights Hospitaller in the Levant is concerned with the early years of the Order of the Hospital of St. John of Jerusalem, the Knights Hospitaller, through 1309. The Order was formed in the later part of the eleventh century and played a major role in the Kingdom of Jerusalem, in particular, the Crusades. This lasted until the West was expelled from the Holy Land, with the Order conquering Rhodes in the early fourteenth century. Among the most important internal events of the early years of the kingdom were the foundation of the Military Orders, which included the Hospitallers, the Knights Templar and the Teutonic Order. Unlike the Hospitallers' beginnings as a benevolent organization, the Templars and Teutonic knights began with a military mission. These three major Orders would play a major role in the military activities of the kingdom, sometimes cooperatively, sometimes not. On the battlefield they frequently shared among them the most important tactical roles, the vanguard and rear-guard.

At the time of the Crusaders' capture of Jerusalem in 1099, the master or regent of the Hospitallers was a certain Gerard who had helped found an Amalfitan hospital around 1070. The Hospitallers were formally recognized by the pope in 1113. Ruling the Hospitallers after 1120, Gerard's successor Raymond du Puy decided that it was not enough for his Order to guide and entertain pilgrims, that it must also be ready to fight to keep the pilgrims' routes open. The distinctive badge of the Knights Hospitaller was the white cross that they wore on their tunics over their armour, and they were a major force in the Holy Land throughout the West's entire enterprise there. The Order continues to this day in various guises, including the Sovereign Military Order of Malta.

The histories of the Order began with the original Latin sources of the First Crusade and related charters and papal bulls concerning the early Kingdom of Jerusalem. In the later twelfth century, William of Tyre offered an account of the Hospitallers, some of which has been verified, some of which was the fantastical story known as the Miracula. By the end of the thirteenth century, an Italian nobleman published the first real Hospitaller history, although the legends of the Miracula continued to be promulgated. The definitive history of the Order was first written by French historian Joseph Delaville Le Roulx in the late nineteenth century. The history of the Hospitallers in the Holy Land through the early fourteenth century is closely intertwined with that of the Crusades in the Levant.

== Early history ==
The first to write officially of the history of the Knights Hospitaller was William of Santo Stefano, a Hospitaller and historian who preserved much of the early records of the Order between 1278 and 1303. William knew of two foundational narratives of the Hospitallers. The first was the popular story of beginnings of the Hospital before the time of Christ known as the Miracula. The second account was one recorded by the twelfth-century archbishop and historian William of Tyre and, while recognizing earlier hospices in Jerusalem, set the date of the founding of the Hospital in the eleventh century by a group of merchants from Amalfi.

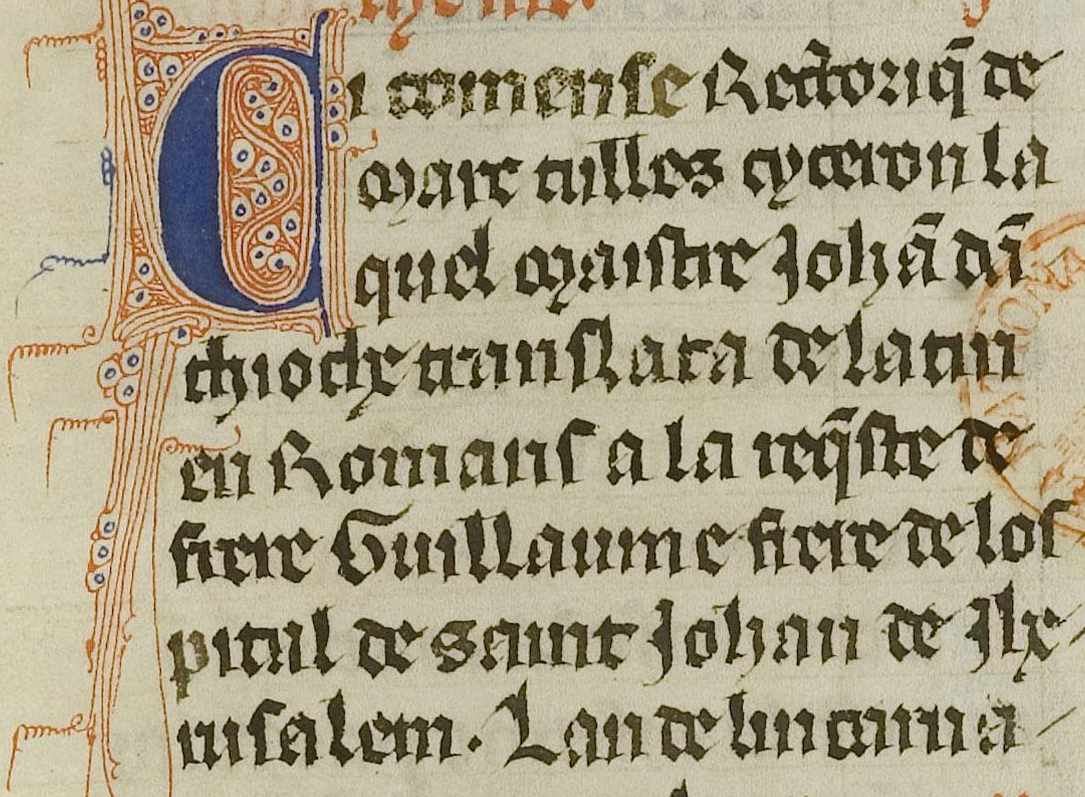
The dedication to Frere Guillaume in the text) in the Chantilly manuscript of William of Santo Stefano

=== The Miracula legend ===
The legendary Miracula attempted to link the origin of the Order to the events of the Roman occupation of the Holy Land and the life of Christ. This was officially promulgated by the Order's second Grand Master Raymond du Puy in his Riwle, a tale lasting into the later thirteenth century. This legendary account begins before the time of Christ with a King Antiochus, the Greek occupier of Jerusalem in the second century BC. Antiochus wanted to punish Menelaus, a high priest of the Jews who had violated the Tomb of David, but divine intervention prevented this and he built a hospital instead. This hospital was supported by alms from Judas Maccabeus and later entrusted to Zacharias, father of John the Baptist, one of its first masters. His successor, known only as Julian the Roman, was guardian when Christ himself visited the hospital, which later sheltered the Virgin Mary and the apostles during the Passion. Christ reappeared here after the Resurrection, doubted by Saint Thomas here, the false converts Ananais and Sapphira were struck down, and the Seven Deacons were elected. Mary lived there for three years, and from there ascended into Heaven.

Conceived prior to the conquest of Jerusalem in 1187 by Saladin, the Miracula was promulgated as gospel for many years afterwards by popes and kings. Through the late 13th century, this legend continued to be promoted to raise funds. Some even claiming that Saint Stephen Protomartyr had been the first Master and attributed fantastical feats to actual early Grand Masters. The legend was repeatedly rewritten between the 13th and 15th centuries, but was debunked thanks to the efforts of William of Santo Stefano.

=== The medieval accounts of the Hospital ===
The medieval legend of the Hospital beginning in the days of the Maccabees contains some elements of truth. There is some evidence of an early hospice destroyed when the Roman emperor Titus conquered Jerusalem in AD 70. In the historical record, there is also an earlier Hospitale Hierosolymitanum, a hospital that had existed in Jerusalem ever since the early days of Christian pilgrimage to the Holy Land. In 603, pope Gregory I commissioned the abbot Probus, originally from Ravenna and previously Gregory's emissary at the Lombard court, to build a hospital in Jerusalem. The resulting bimaristan––Persian for hospital––was built at Muristan in the Christian Quarter of the Old City to treat and care for Christian pilgrims to the Holy Land.

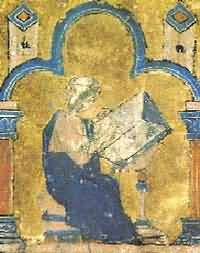
William of Tyre writing his history, from a 13th-century Old French translation, Bibliothèque Nationale de France, Paris, MS 2631, f.1r

In 800, Charlemagne enlarged Probus' hospital and added a library to it, lasting for two centuries. The monks responsible for the service of the church and the hospice belonged to the Order of Saint Benedict. These monks requested a solution to a dogmatic controversy from pope Leo lll, which was given by the Council of Aix la Chapelle in 809. Charlemagne then obtained protections from Abbasid caliph Harun al-Rashid with a tax collected from pilgrims. This arrangement was continued by successive emperors and caliphs. As late as the rule of Louis II of Italy, diplomatic relations continued with the sons of al-Rashid, and the situation of the Christians remained stable in Palestine. This is verified from a letter read at the Eighth Ecumenical Council of Constantinople in 869 from Theodosius of Jerusalem to Ignatios of Constantinople that states: "The Muslims show much kindness toward us, giving us permission to build our churches and prohibiting our behavior, by acting justly and inflicting injury or violence on us in no way." About that same time, the Frankish pilgrim Bernard the Monk visited Jerusalem and reported the existence of the hospice and the church near the Holy Sepulchre, at the foot of the hill, reporting no incidents with the Muslims. Bernard reported that the hospice was associated with a church devoted to St. Mary, although not necessarily the eleventh century church described below.

The tenth century was a turbulent one in the Holy Land, but Christians, both local and those at pilgrimage, were relatively safe. The Byzantine campaigns led by Nikephoros II Phokas and John I Tzimiskes of 968–975 subjugated Syria to the Greek empire. Jerusalem was occupied in 970 by the Egyptian Fatimid Caliphate. However, these disturbances did not adversely affect the Latin establishments in the Holy Land, reflected in the important donation in 993 by Hugh the Great, margrave of Tuscany, to the Church of the Holy Sepulchre and to the monastery of the Church of Jerusalem.

=== Destruction and restoration of the Holy Sepulchre ===
By the beginning of the eleventh century, the Christians of the Holy Land were under the dominion of the Fatimids, enjoying considerable autonomy. Their persecution began under the reign of al-Hakim bi-Amr Allah, the son of a Christian mother and brought up largely by Christians. In 1004, he began his rebellion against his early influences, passing ordinances against the Christians, confiscating Church property, having mosques built atop of churches, and ultimately burning the churches themselves. The Church of the Holy Sepulchre was a primary target of the sultan's rage. On 18 October 1009, al-Hakim ordered the destruction of the Church of the Holy Sepulchre and its associated buildings. Processions were prohibited, and a few years later nearly all of the convents and churches in Palestine were said to have been destroyed or confiscated. The Basilica of Bethlehem was the only one spared.

Beginning in 1012, al-Hakim began allowing Christians and Jews to return to their faith and rebuild their ruined houses of worship. From the middle of the twelfth century, the weakness of Charlemagne's successors had resulted in the care of protecting the Christians in the Holy Land passing to the Byzantine emperors. After the death of al-Hakim in 1021, his son and successor Ali az-Zahir allowed the reconstruction of the Holy Sepulchre to commence and the role of protectorate was officially transferred to the Byzantines. Christian pilgrimage began again in earnest, reaching a fever pitch in 1033, believed to be the thousandth anniversary of the crucifixion. It wasn't until 1042 that the Byzantine emperor Constantine IX Monomachos undertook to reconstruct the church, and pilgrim protections were exercised by the emperor's forces. In the year 1065, Easter fell on the same date as it had in AD 33, and pilgrimage was at its height. The situation of the Christians were not significantly threatened during this period, as pilgrimages and donations continued, especially from England. Interactions between the churches of Jerusalem and the Constantinople remained active. This continued unabated until the capture of Jerusalem in 1073 by the Seljuk Turks under Atsiz ibn Uwaq. The resulting treatment of pilgrims was a major impetus to the call to crusade by pope Urban II in 1095.

=== The Amalfitans ===
The account of William of Tyre begins in the eleventh century and has been confirmed in its general structure by other contemporaneous sources. It is clear that merchants from Amalfi, struck by the precarious situation of the Christians in the Holy Land, were the catalyst behind the hospital. These merchants obtained from the Fatimids, with whom they were in frequent commercial relations, permission for the Latins to establish a church and a hospice in Jerusalem. The time at which this concession was granted has been difficult to specify, with early chroniclers of the First Crusade giving different dates. Ekkehard of Aura stated that the Hospital never ceased to exist in Jerusalem. William of Tyre placed the date at 1023 with the patron saint John the Almoner, the charitable seventh-century patriarch of Alexandria. Tyre's account was supported by the anonymous Historia belli sacri, and represents a belief that lasted into the early 20th century. Sicard of Cremona reported the date as 1086.

The medieval Italian chronicler Amatus of Montecassino recorded the establishment of hospitals in Jerusalem and Antioch by the initiative of a rich and pious Amalfitan named Mauro of Pantaleone with close family ties to the Abbey of Monte Cassino. An anonymous Amalfitan chronicler reported that archbishop Giovanni of Amalfi (1070 – 1082) went on a pilgrimage to Jerusalem and was welcomed by Amalfitans who had founded, a few years before in 1070, two hospices in the Hadrianic forum for the treatment of sick pilgrims, one each for men and women. It is this latter interpretation that is borne out by archeological evidence, and is accepted by modern historians.

The Hospital of St. John was therefore believed to have been founded shortly before 1070 in Jerusalem, as a dependency of the Benedictine house of the Church of Saint Mary of the Latins. The founding Amalfian merchants dedicated this hospice to St. John the Baptist, reflecting the pre-sixth century Basilica of the Crucifix in Amalfi dedicated to the Assumption. Shortly thereafter, a second hospice for women was founded and dedicated to Saint Mary Magdalene. The hospital, in the Muristan district of Jerusalem, was to provide care for sick, poor, or injured pilgrims to the Holy Land. The Egyptian governor of the city had allowed the Amalfitan consul to choose a suitable site, now the Monastery of St. John the Baptist. The hospice was staffed mainly by Amalfitans, who took the usual monastic vows and were under the direction of a Master, who in turn was under the Order of Saint Benedict established in Palestine. The facility had no apparent endowments, relying instead on the merchants and Benedictines of Amalfi. No documents from before 1099 have survived.

The Church of Saint Mary of the Latins and her dependent houses must have established during the reign of the Fatimid caliph al-Mustansir, grandson of the despoiler al-Hakim. This would have been after 1063, when the Christian Quarter was re-established, and before 1070, when the Seljuks first challenged Fatimid rule of Jerusalem. Mauro of Pantaleone died in 1071 and the pilgrimage of Giovanni of Amalfi must have been in the next decade. The foundation of the Hospital is then dated to the late 1060s, with its opening a few years later. This is consistent with the statements of pope Paschal II in his bull of 1113 which recognized the many pious donations made for "ad sustentandas peregrinorum et pauperum necessitates, vel in Hierosolymitane ecclesie vel aliarum ecclesiarum parrochiis et civitatum territories."

Twelfth-century pilgrim texts confirm the existence and location of the hospice and church of St. John. There is some confusion as to the role of the Hospital in its early years, either a proper infirmary or simply a boarding house. William of Tyre called it xenodochium. Others, including Amatus of Montecassino and Albert of Aachen, called it a hospitale. Both interpretations are likely correct as it would be difficult to maintain a lodging house serving pilgrims without also providing medical services.

== Origins, 1070–1140 ==
The first century of the Hospitallers were dominated by two figures. The first is regarded as the founder of the hospital, the Benedictine Gerard who served for nearly half a century. The second is a French knight named Raymond du Puy who turned the Order into a military organization.

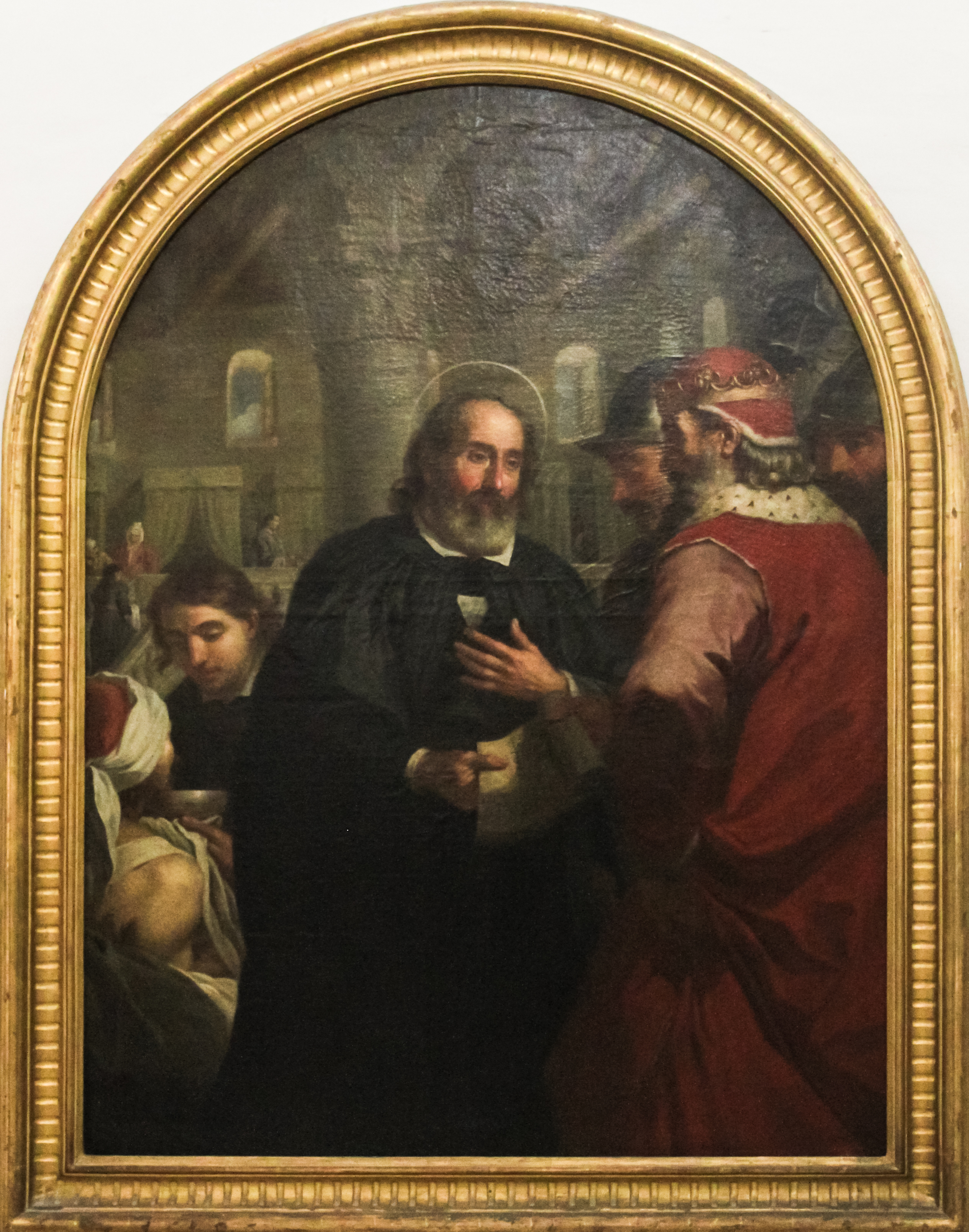
Blessed Gérard receiving Godefroy de Bouillon. Painting by Antoine de Favray, in Musée National des Beaux-Arts de Malte.

=== Gerard and the First Crusade ===
Around 1080, the Abbot of the Church of Saint Mary of the Latins appointed a Benedictine lay brother Pierre-Gérard de Martigues, later known as Blessed Gerard, to lead the Hospital as its rector. He was possibly one of the frates conversi who came to the Holy Land to serve at the abbey. His date of birth was around 1040 and his place of birth is traditionally regarded as being Martigues, Provence. A number of hypothetical histories of Gerard and his family have been proposed and rejected.

Just prior to the Siege of Jerusalem of 1099, much of the Christian population had been expelled from Jerusalem by the Fatimids to prevent collusion with the Western besiegers. Following the capture of the city by the Crusaders, the Eastern Christians were gradually returned. Gerard remained behind with some fellow serving brothers to tend to the sick in the hospital. Shortly thereafter, the Hospital was detached from Saint Mary's and acquired a measure of autonomy under its institutor Gerard. It began receiving privileges and donations in its own name from at least 1100 onward. Gerard acquired territory and revenues for the organization throughout the kingdom and beyond. In the immediate times after the First Crusade, the Hospitallers were not an established Order, military or otherwise.

Despite the rules of Christian ethics, charity by the rich sometimes was simply a condescending distribution of alms. Until the Hospitallers, the biblical sentiments were never embodied in a formal institution. This view was held by the group of knights that had been assembled by Gerard after the crusaders' successful siege of Jerusalem. They proclaimed charity as their primary task and obligation. Knighthood had been thrust into a monastic and ecclesiastical situation.

The Order's earliest archives, now at the National Library of Malta, contain at least four versions of a royal confirmation of the Hospital granted by Baldwin I of Jerusalem in 1110. The archives also contain acts given in 1112 by Latin patriarch Arnulf of Chocques and Ehremar, then archbishop of Caesarea. The independence of the Hospital was ensured on 19 June 1112 when pope Paschal II took Saint Mary of the Latins under the protection of the Holy See. This is the date of the birth of the new institution representing the hospital, and the papal privilege granted by the pope on 15 February 1113 with his well-known bull Pie postulatio voluntatis was the ratification of the status quo. This privilege recognized the Hospital as an independent order, and it was subsequently confirmed by Callixtus II in his papal bull Ad hoc nos disponente dated 16 June 1119, addressed to Gerard (instituor ac prepositus Hierosolymitani xenodochii). This was repeated by Honorius II in a bull issued 1123. Innocent II continued the confirmation on 16 June 1135 with his bull Chritianae fidei religio, granting the Hospital extensive privileges. Among other documents preserved is a papal letter of Celestine II giving the Hospitallers jurisdiction over the Santa Maria Alemanna (Church of Saint Mary of the Germans) in Jerusalem. Both popes referenced Gerard as the Order's founder and predecessor to the Grand Master Raymond du Puy. Paschal's papal bull also recognized the Canons Regular of the Holy Sepulchre that date to 1099. A letter from pope Alexander III in 1172 welcomed Jobert of Syria, hoping he would continue the work established by Gerard.

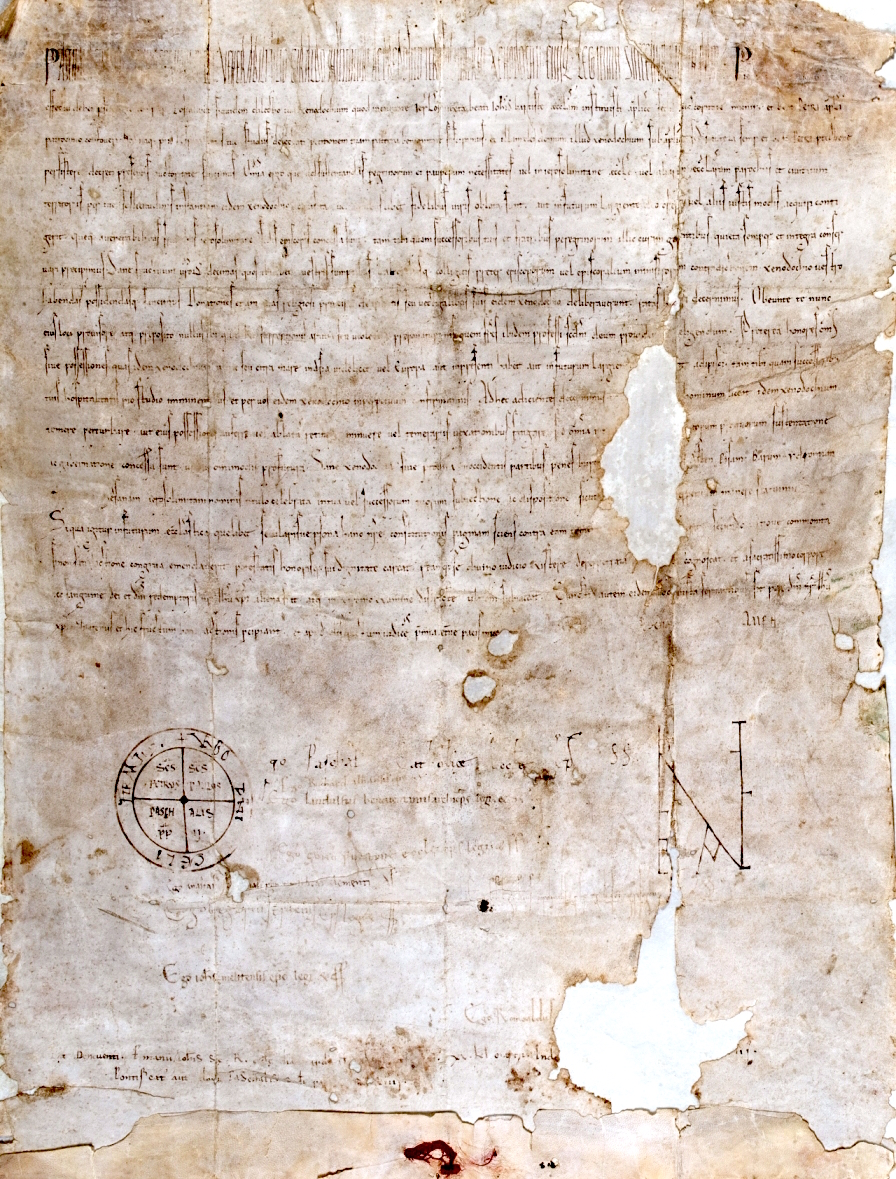
Pie postulatio voluntatis. Bull issued by Paschal II in 1113 in favor of the Order of St. John of Jerusalem, which was to transform what was a community of pious men into an institution within the Church.

After 1113, there were numerous charters, deeds and records kept, and many of the documents specifically related to Gerard. While Gerard is regarded as the first Grand Master of the Knights Hospitaller, it is not strictly correct as that title did not exist until the middle of the 13th century. However, the Order's tradition, expressed in the Chronicle of the Deceased Masters, identifies Gerard as the first Master in a text dated 1357. In the early part of the twentieth century, Gerard was described as thus.

Donations and privileges were showered upon the new establishment. Godfrey de Bouillon led the way by granting to it in Jerusalem itself the [village of Hessilia] and two bakehouses. Kings, nobles and prelates followed suit, not in the Holy Land only, but in Provence, France, Spain, Portugal, England and Italy: in Portugal a whole province was in 1114 made over to Gerard and his brethren. In 1113 Pope Paschal II took the order and its possessions under his immediate protection, his act being confirmed in 1119 by Calixtus II and subsequently by other popes. Gerard was indeed, as Paschal called him, the instituter of the order, if not its founder. It retained, however, during his lifetime its purely eleemosynary character.

It is unclear what the village of Hessalia (casal Hessilia, or Es Silsileh) might refer to, but the bakehouses were apparently ovens that were an important source of income to their operator. By 1118, the hospital had also acquired property in the Principality of Antioch and the County of Tripoli.

The early records of the Hospitallers is confusing as there were a number of brothers named Gerard. However, Blessed Gerard was likely the one who raised the True Cross to the Crusaders in the First Battle of Ramla in 1101, with Fulcher of Chartres writing of a venerabilis abbas Gerhardus, qui tunc Crucem Dominicam semper lateri regis contiguus praeferebat. Much that is known about Gerard is from the many donations to the Order naming him in particular. Godfrey of Bouillon, the first Latin ruler of Jerusalem, gave some property to the hospital, and his successor Baldwin I of Jerusalem granted it one-tenth of the spoils of the victory at Ramla. The most renown of the donations is that of Roger Borsa, Duke of Apulia, who gave a gift of 1000 bezants to Latin patriarch Dagobert of Pisa with the stipulation that one third of the gift was to go to the hospital. The patriarch unfortunately kept the gift for himself, contributing to his downfall. In 1118, Roger of Salerno, regent of Antioch, confirmed Hospitaller properties in the principality, including ones offered directly to Gerard, the leader of the Hospitallers, when they met in Jerusalem. Later documents from to the years immediately following his death and mention his name likely in accordance with an established custom.

=== Miracula and Gerard ===
A papal bull of Celestine III in 1191 and another of Innocent IV in 1254 continued to acknowledge the Miracula fable as official history. While recognizing actual historical details, they referred also to the miracle related to the Blessed Gerard. According to this account, Gerard lived in the Holy City, caring for the poor and the sick. During the siege of Jerusalem of 1099, he climbed upon a parapet each day and, rather than stones, threw small loaves of bread to the besieging Crusaders. The Muslim defenders discovered Gerard while he was helping the Christian troops and took him before the "sultan", likely referring to the Fatimid governor of Jerusalem Iftikhar ad-Daula. For evidence, the sack of loaves was presented, but Gerard's accusers could only find stones in his bag. The loaves had miraculously turned into rocks. Gerard was freed and continued helping the Crusaders each day until 15 July 1099. These accounts led to his hagiography, with him dying in coelesti sede collocato, posted on a heavenly throne. According to other versions, the Muslims believed that Gerard was hoarding money and not paying the proper taxes, and he was arrested and tortured, leaving him crippled for the rest of his life.

=== Medical tradition of the Hospitallers ===
As the Hospitallers evolved, their original medical tradition became secondary to their military role. They had grown out of a single hospice in Jerusalem, and its original charter said nothing of military activities, nobility or knighthood. It later became predominantly military but the maintenance of its medical and charitable traditions remained of spiritual and moral significance, important to enjoy the continued support of European donors. Much of the knowledge of illnesses and their treatments was brought from the West. Nevertheless, they also acquired local practices from the Muslims in the East as reported in various sources, including Albert of Aachen. Many of these were magical or religious, such as beliefs in relics and miracles, which were also features of the Western medicine in the same timeframe.

Many of the medical, liturgical and other regulations concerning the Order's hospital functions were applicable not only to a conventional hospital, but to the unique situation of the kingdom. There was considerable confusion in the statutes between pilgrims and other travellers, between charity and hospitality, between medical hospitals and other types of hospice, and the infirmaria fratrum available only to the Hospitaller brethren. There was also a distinction between the donats—members of the Hospital who pledged obedience to it—and those pensioners who could purchase their own board and lodging as required. The Hospitallers' original concern was directed increasingly to those poor or pilgrims who became ill, while continuing the hospice mission. This expressed an approach to give practical help to the suffering as an end in itself rather than as a means through which the agent of the good works might hope to secure salvation.

The Latin chronicles of the First Crusade have been of help in dating the early years of the hospital. Twelfth-century pilgrim texts, such as that of Benjamin of Tudela, also confirm the existence and location of a hospice and church of St. John. Sæwulf was probably the first pilgrim to visit Jerusalem following the First Crusade, writing the following.

Outside the door of the Church of the Holy Sepulchre towards the south is the Church of Sancta Maria, which is called the Latin Church because there the service is always offered to the Lord in Latin; and the Assyrians say that the same Blessed Mother of God, at the crucifixion of her Son our Lord, stood in the very spot where the altar of that church is. To this church is attached another church of Sancta Maria, which is called Parva, where some nuns frequent who serve her and her Son most devoutly. And near to it is the hospital where is the celebrated monastery dedicated to the honour of St. John the Baptist.

An anonymous pilgrim wrote the following.

Near the Church of the Sepulchre stands St. Mary's Church, called St. Mary the Latin, on the place where it is said that St. Mary Magdalen and St. Mary the wife of Cleophas tore their hair when the Lord was put upon the cross, and there is the Hospital of St. John the Baptist.

An early account by German pilgrim John of Würzburg is among the most detailed. Around 1165 he wrote the following in his Descriptio terrae sanctae.

Over against the Church of the Holy Sepulchre...is a beautiful church built in honour of John the Baptist, annexed to which is a hospital wherein in various rooms is collected together an enormous multitude of sick people, both men and women, who are tended and restored to health daily at a very great expense. Vhen I was there I learned that the whole number of these sick people amounted to two thousand, of whom sometimes in the course of one day and night more than fifty are carried out dead, while many other fresh ones keep continually arriving. What more can I say? This same house supplies as many people outside it with victuals as it does those inside, in addition to the boundless charity which is daily bestowed upon poor people who beg their bread from door to door and do not lodge in the house, so that the whole sum total of its expenses can surely never be calculated even by the managers and stewards thereof. In addition to all these moneys expended upon the sick and upon other poor people, this same house also maintains in its various castles many persons trained to all kinds of military exercises for the defence of the land of the Christians against the invasions of the Saracens. Close to this Church of St. John is the convent of nuns built in honour of the Blessed Mary, which at its head almost touches the buildings of the aforesaid church, and is called the Convent of St. Mary the Great.

Libellus de Locis Sanctis, written by an unknown monk Theoderich, is a 12th-century travelogue of Palestine used by Christian pilgrims to the Holy Places. It described the hospital as well as the roles of the military orders as follows.

As one goes out of the church towards the south...there is a chapel dedicated to the three Maries, which belongs to the Latins...and here, on the south side of the church, stands the Church and Hospital of St. John the Baptist. As for this, no one can credibly tell another how beautiful its buildings are, how abundantly it is supplied" with rooms and beds and other material for the use of poor and sick people, how rich it is in the means of refreshing the poor, and how devotedly it labours to maintain the needy, unless he has had the opportunity of seeing it with his own eyes. Indeed, we passed through this palace, and were unable by any means to discover the number of sick people lying there; but we saw that the beds numbered more than one thousand. It is not every one even of the most powerful kings and despots who could maintain as many people as that house does every day; and no wonder, for, in addition to its possessions in other countries..., the Hospitallers and the Templars have conquered almost all the cities and villages which once belonged to Judaea, and which were destroyed by Vespasian and Titus, together with all their lands and vineyards; for they have troops stationed throughout the entire country, and castles well fortified against the infidels. Next to this, to the east as one stands there, comes the Church of St. Mary, in which nuns, under the rule of an abbess, celebrate Divine service daily. This place is said to have been dedicated to St. Mary because, while our Saviour was being maltreated on the way to His Passion, she is said to have been shut up by His command in a chamber which then stood upon that spot. Moreover, there closely follows another church on the east of this, which is also dedicated to our Lady, because while our Lord was enduring such suffering for our salvation, she fainted from excess of sorrow, and was carried by men's hands thither into a subterranean grotto, where in the indulgence of her grief she tore her hair from her head, which hair is preserved to this day in a glass vessel in that church.

Theoderich's account repeats some of the Miracula stories. Other travelers' accounts showed admiration of his charitable activities as can be found in the library of the Palestine Pilgrims' Text Society (PPTS).

=== Death and beatification of Gerard ===
The last document that mentions Gerard is dated 19 June 1119 and his death is estimated to have occurred on 3 September 1120, a date which is not universally accepted. He left behind the legacy as the leader of a group of friars, the head of a religious entity and the founder of a new institution that administered to pilgrims and the poor. His main activity was philanthropy. In the anonymous Chronicon Sancti Maxentii Pictavensis, written before 1124, it was stated that:

In the same year it rained honey from heaven, fire came into Jerusalem, as on Easter, on the day of the Assumption of St. Mary; Giraud, a hospitalist from Jerusalem the same year he died in holy conversation.

Crusader historian Fulcher of Chartres also wrote of Gerard's death in his narrative account Gesta Francorum Iherusalem Perefrinantium written during the reign of Baldwin II of Jerusalem.

A universal tradition has that Gerard was beatified, and it is with a "halo of sanctity" that his memory prevailed in Hospitaller histories. Absolute proofs of Gerard's canonization are lacking. However, the secular cult of which he was the object throughout the Middle Ages is an indication of the heavenly reward which the popular voice attributed to his virtues. In actuality, most twelfth-century saints are in the same situation as Gerard, claiming no official attestation of sanctity. In the case of Gerard, the persistent epithet of blessed (beatus), under which his memory has survived the centuries, points in favor of his canonization as during the High Middle Ages the term beatus was equivalent to sanctus. If Gerard was never designated as a saint, it is likely because the tradition which beatified him was so firmly established from the beginning that it did not allow itself to alter that which became an integral part of Gerard's name.

=== Raymond du Puy ===
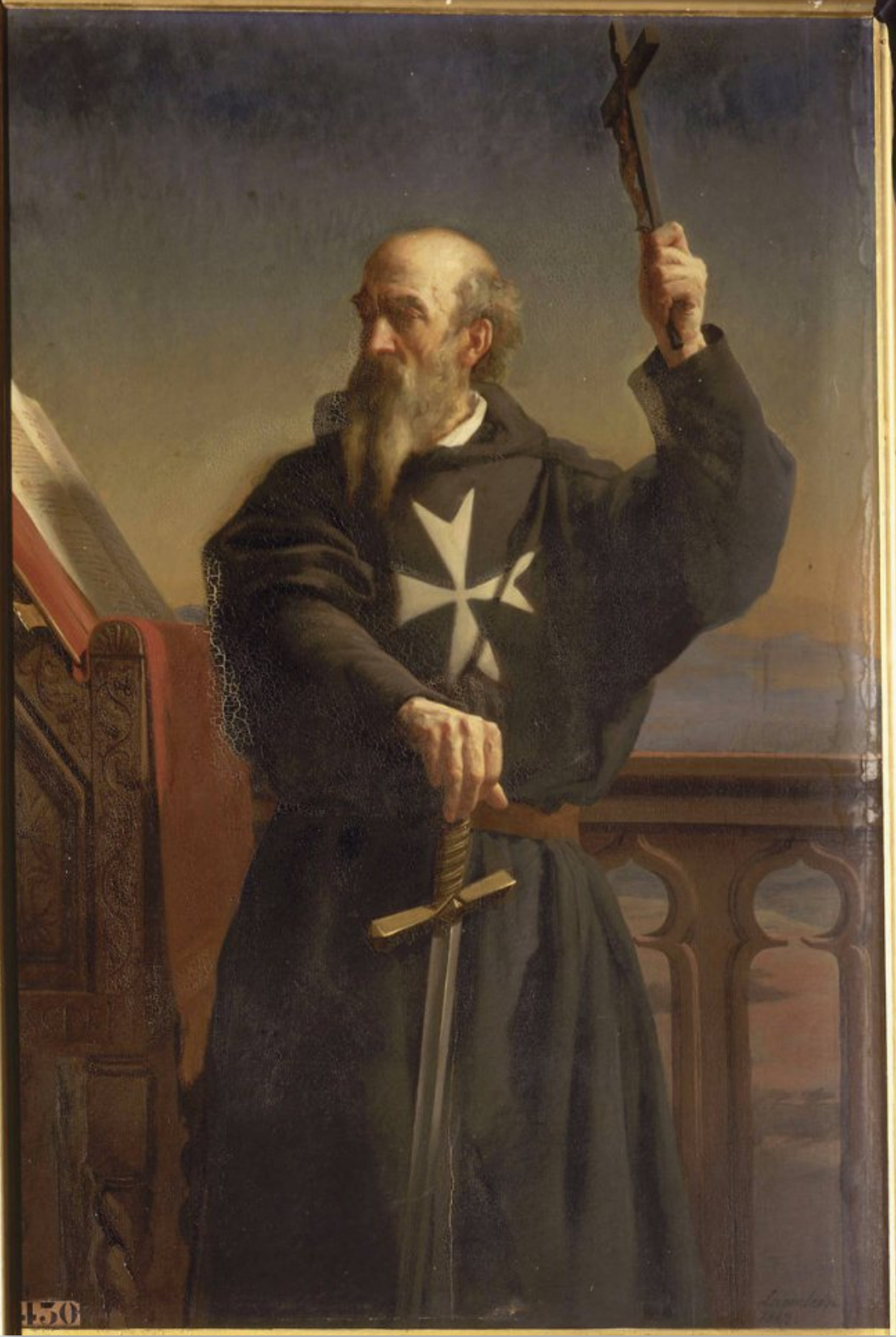
Raymond du Puy par Alexandre Laemlein dans la Salle des Croisades du Château de Versailles

After the death of Gerard, there were two interim rectors of the Hospital before a Grand Master was elected. The first was Pierre de Barcelone who served from 1120 to 1121/1122. Nothing more is known of de Barcelone, except that he was succeeded by a brother of the Order, Boyant Roger, serving from 1121/1122 to 1123. There few traces of his rectorship other that a donation in 1120 from a certain Attone, Count of Abruzzo, who gave property now belonging to the Commandery of Fermo as a reward for the way in which the count had been received by the Hospitaller brothers. There is also evidence of property acquired in the cities of Bethlehem, Antioch, Margat, Acre, Alexandria and Constantinople, as well as in Syria and other regions of the East.

Raymond du Puy (1083–1160) was a knight from France who formally succeeded Gerard as the second Grand Master of the Order, serving from around 1122 or 1123 until 1160. His assumption of the magisterium followed that of the two interim rectors, and his role in the Order before that time is unknown; his first official act was recorded on 9 December 1124. Information on Hospitaller activity during Raymond's early years as Grand Master is limited and in those years, the Order was dedicated to a social mission. Raymond divided the membership of the Order into clerical, military, and serving brothers, and established the first significant Hospitaller infirmary near the Church of the Holy Sepulchre in Jerusalem. He also had dealings with the Order's business in Spain.

Raymond gave the Hospitaller its first statutes, bearing his name, and the Rule of the Hospitaller is believed to have been composed around 1130. What is certain is that it predates 1153, as it was approved by pope Eugene III after 1145 and before 7 July 1153, the date of his death. Then, and only then, did the Hospitaller officially become an Order. From 1135 to 1154, the Order enjoyed an exemption from local religious authorities.

Raymond also introduced the Order's Great Seal, or leaden bulla, that remained in use from the twelfth century until 1798. Until 1278, when Grand Master Nicolas Lorgne introduced a separate conventual bulla, there was no distinction between the seal of the Grand Master and that of the Order itself. The general design of the seal featured, on the obverse, the Grand Master kneeling in prayer before the patriarchal cross. This image was usually accompanied with the sacred letters alpha and omega, which referenced the Second Coming of Christ. The central image was surrounded by a legend with the Master's name followed by the official designation CVSTOS.

In the rooms of the Salles des Croisades (Hall of Crusades) at the Château de Versailles there is a full-length portrait of Raymond du Puy painted in 1842 by Alexandre Laemlein in the Third Room of the hall. In the Second Room, there are two battle scenes: Defense of Celesyria by Raymond Dupuy painted by Édouard Cibot in 1844 and Raymond of Puy takes Body of Turks as Prisoners, by an unknown artist. Both scenes represent military action in Syria around 1130.

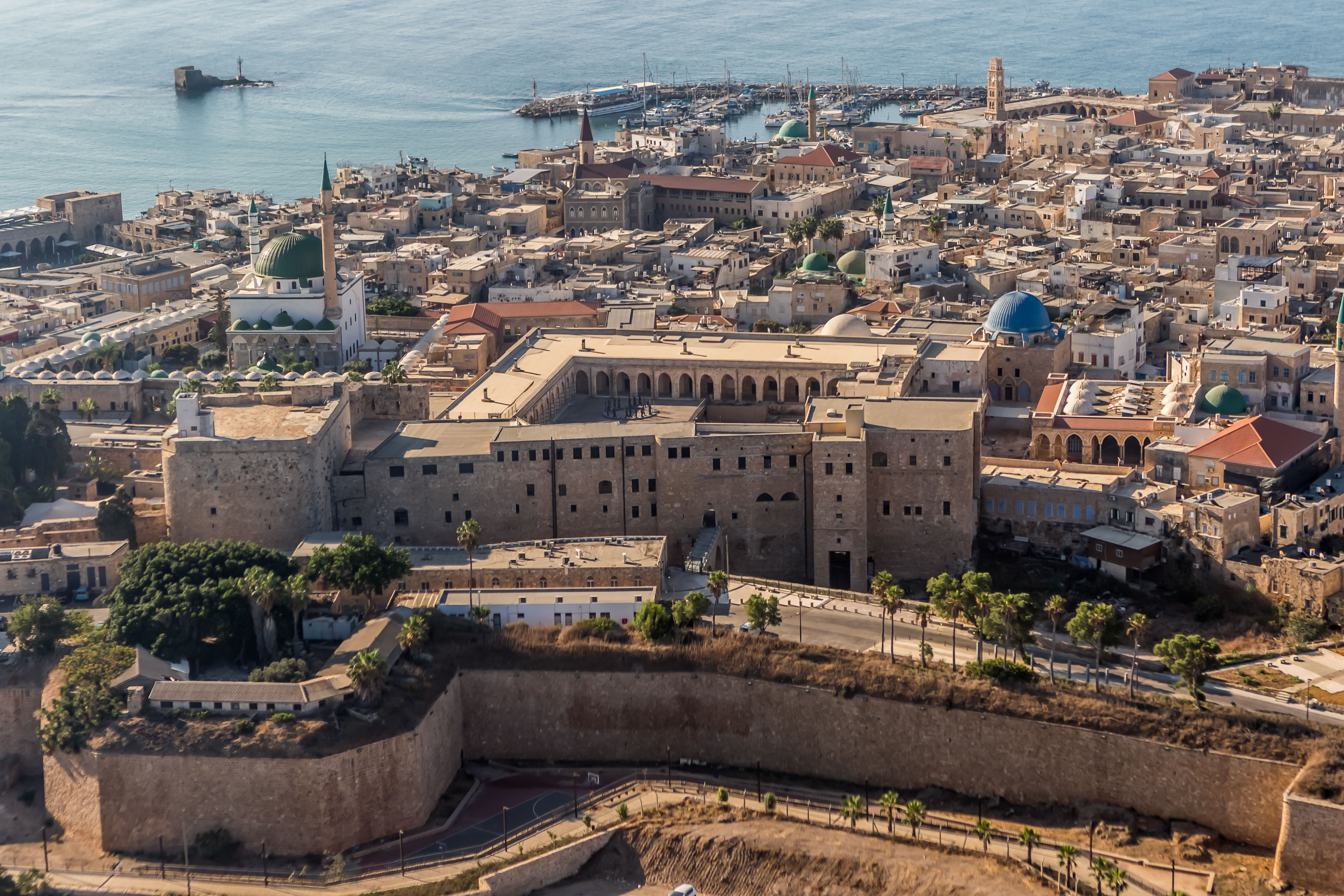
Hospitaller Commandery of Saint-Jean-d'Acre, 12th–13th centuries

The First Crusade ended with the capture of Jerusalem in 1099, but it took another four years to complete the capture of Acre, occurring in 1104. From the first years of the establishment of a Crusader presence in Acre, the Hospitallers received donated properties in the region. In 1110, Baldwin I of Jerusalem granted the Order permission to begin construction of a commandery located north of the Sainte-Croix church. In 1130, the Orders' buildings were damaged during work at the church and the Hospitallers decided to move near the north wall of the city. This was to become the Hospitaller Commandery of Saint-Jean-d'Acre. In 1127, Pons of Tripoli gave the castle Coliath to the Hospitallers––the first of the Order's castles––which was to remain in their possession until seized by the Ayyubids in 1207. In 1149, the first testimony of the commandery is in a document concerning the construction of the Saint-Jean-d'Acre church. In 1169, a pilgrim described the commandery of the Hospitallers of Acre as a very impressive fortified building.

In 1143, Celestine II gave the Hospitallers jurisdiction over the Santa Maria Alemanna, a hospital formed in 1128 to accommodate German pilgrims and other various Crusaders. Although formally an institution of the Hospitallers, the pope decreed that the Prior and the brothers of the domus Theutonicorum (house of the Germans) should always be Germans themselves, so a tradition of a German-led religious institution could develop during the twelfth century in the kingdom. The latter became the Teutonic Order, formed in 1190. Raymond also took over the management of the leprosarium outside Jerusalem that eventually split off to become the Order of Saint Lazarus, becoming its seventh Grand Master just before his death.

In 1156, a conflict broke out between Raymond and Fulk of Angoulême, the Latin patriarch of Jerusalem. The patriarch had complained that the Hospitallers did not respect his ecclesiastical rights. He accused them of a variety of religious infractions and some personal affronts. The Order's ospital, installed opposite the Holy Sepulchre, competed with it by the beauty and height of its buildings and when the patriarch preached, his voice was covered by the Hospitallers' bells. The Hospitallers had seen fit to respond by invading the Holy Sepulchre with an armed force. Fulk resolved to go to pope Adrian IV and ask for the withdrawal of the papal bull of Anastasius IV of 21 October 1154 which confirmed the prerogatives of the Order. Fulk led a contingent of various bishops and archbishops of Outremer to Rome in the spring of 1155. Their case was eventually pleaded before the pope, finishing in endless debates. Fulk returned to Jerusalem in the autumn of 1155 with no satisfaction.

=== Constitution and organization ===
The Rule of the Hospitaller was formulated by Raymond and was based on that of the Augustinian Canons. It was similar to those of the Templars, with statutes regulating the life of the brethren, the terms of admission to the Order, the maintenance of discipline and punishments. The Order was divided into the three classes of knights (fratres milites), chaplains (fratres capellani), and sergeants-at-arms (fratres servientes armigeri), with affiliated brethren (confratres) and donati, which were regular subscribers for which it was granted privileges and the ultimate right to become one of their knights. The aristocratic rule confined the coveted admission to the lawful sons of knights or other family members.members of knightly families. The leaders were generically called bailiffs (bailivi).

The high offices in the Order were held by knights and the ecclesiastical roles were filled by chaplains. The masters of the squires and turcopoliers (cavalry commanders), were held by sergeants. The Hospitallers were at the outset a healing brotherhood as opposed to the Templars which was purely military. This role was diminished as their military function grew, but it never disappeared. The Order's chapters were charged with building, furnishing, and improving hospitals. The Hospitallers also welcomed women into their order, whereas the monastic and pure military rule of the Templars forbade mixing of the sexes. To wit, an Italian woman had founded the Saint Mary Magdalene hospice for women in connection with the Order. These sisters devoted themselves to prayer and nursing, fleeing to Europe in 1187 where they became a purely contemplative order.

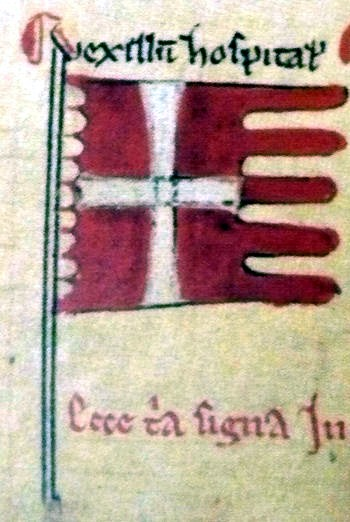
Banner of the Hospitallers (vexillum hospitalorum) as depicted in the Chronica Maiora by Matthew Paris, c. 1250.

The basic organizational unit of the Order was the commandery or preceptory, consisting of a small group of knights and sergeants living under the rule of the Commander (Preceptor), supervising several properties. The commanderies were grouped into priories, under the rule of the Prior and these again into provinces that were ruled by Grand Commanders. These became national divisions called Langues. The organization was led by the Grand Master, elected from the ranks of the knights, a process similar to that of the Grand Master of the Templars. They held office for life, but not absolute power, but were accountable to the General Chapter of the Knights which met periodically.

The immediate subordinates of the Grand Master seven dignitaries known as the Conventual Bailiffs. They were the Grand Commander (Preceptor), Marshal, Draper (Grand Conservator), Hospitaller, Treasurer, Admiral, and Turcopolier. The Grand Commander, elected subject to the approval of the Grand Master, was the lieutenant, empowered to seal for him and, in the event of his capture by the enemy, to act as Master ad interim. The Hospitaller had his own seal and was responsible for everything concerning the Orders' hospitals. The Admiral was at sea what the Marshal was on land. The position of Constable reported to the Marshal and commanded up to several hundred knights plus any number of the mercenaries that were utilized in a particular campaign. The Turcopolier was head of the cavalries, the Master Esquire was in charge of horses, the Gonfanonier was the standard-bearer, and the Castellans (Châtelains) commanded individual castles. The functions of the officers was similar to that of the Templars.

== Militarization of the Order, 1140–1193 ==
It was under the magisterium of Raymond du Puy that the Knights Hospitaller took on a more military character. An act of 17 January 1126 contains the first reference to a Constable of the Hospitallers, an individual named Durand, who had military responsibilities but who may have been hired by the hospital rather than a member of the order itself. This predated the formation of the Templars by two years, but the rise in influence of the Templars also contributed to the increased military mission of the Hospitallers. Nineteenth-century depictions in the Salles des Croisades show Raymond in battle as early as 1130. The first mention of their assuming a more militant role is related to the Crusader castle built at Bethgiblein, erected by Fulk of Jerusalem in 1135 as part of a string of fortifications to protect the kingdom. It commanded the road from Ascalon to Hebron, and Fulk donated the castle to the Order in 1136 for its operation and maintenance. Following the example of the Templars, Raymond developed protections for pilgrims by providing them with security in their travels to the Holy Places. As this transition progress, he hired knights and men-at-arms as mercenaries and participated, through intermediaries, in the defense of the kingdom. As early as 1154, a category of brother-priests was granted by pope Anastasius IV, it was not until the statutes of 1184 that physicians appeared among the Order's medical personnel. And in the military field, brothers-in-arms, recognized since 1160, were formalized and the Order became, in law, a religious-military order.

From 1137 onwards, the Order appeared in the wars that the troops of the kingdom of Jerusalem waged against their many enemies which regularly attacked from all sides. Ascalon, because of its position on the seashore on the way to Egypt, was a permanent danger for the Christians, and the enemy made continuous incursions into the southern part of the kingdom. On the advice of Fulk, the Franks decided to fortify the position of Hisn Ibn Akkar, which belonged to the Hospitallers and was located east of Ascalon. The work, directed with speed by Latin patriarch William of Malines, was entrusted to the Hospitallers, who were thus placed in a vanguard position in the defense from the Egyptians.

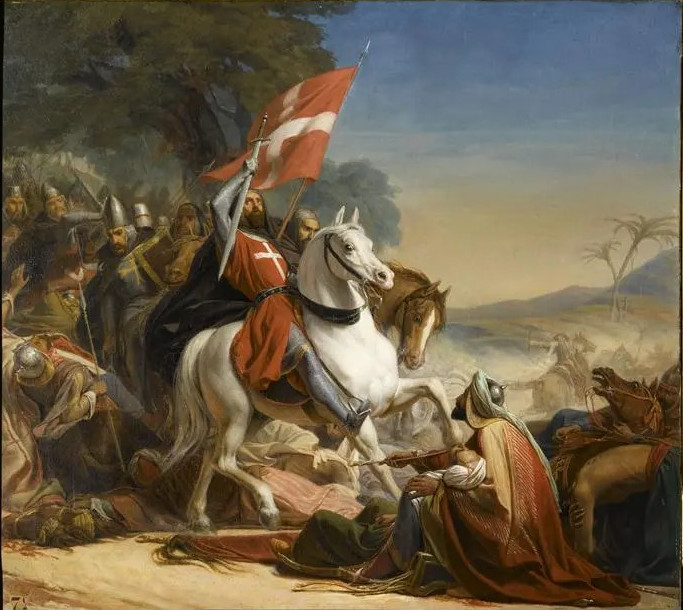
Défense de la Celesyrie par Raymond du Puy par Édouard Cibot dans les Salles des Croisades du Château de Versailles

=== The Second Crusade and its aftermath ===
When the Second Crusade began in 1147, the Hospitallers were a major force in the kingdom and the political importance of the Grand Master had increased. In June 1148 at the Council of Acre, Raymond du Puy was among the princes who undertook the decision to undertake the Siege of Damascus. The blame for the resulting disastrous loss was placed on the Templars, not the Hospitallers. In the Holy Land, the influence of the Hospitallers became preponderant with a decisive role taken in military operations due to the governance of Raymond.

After the failure of the Second Crusade, attention again turned to the fortress at Ascalon held by the Fatimids. Amidst the Siege of Ascalon in 1153, a truce was held to enable each side to bury its dead. Baldwin III of Jerusalem held a council in his tent, with a relic of the True Cross present. After five months of siege, the position of the Franks had not improved. An Egyptian fleet had dispersed the Latin fleet, the Templars had suffered a serious defeat during the assault, and a good part of the knights had been massacred. The lay nobles, discouraged by the reverse, wished to abandon the siege, but Raymond and Latin patriarch Fulk of Angoulême persuaded Baldwin III to continue. The attack was renewed more vigorously than before and, three days later, on 19 August 1153, the besieged Muslims capitulated and the following day they evacuated the city.

In 1156, Nūr-ad-Din and his brother Nasr-ad-Din routed a force of Hospitallers near their stronghold Qalaat el-Marqab close to Banias. After a peace treaty was broken by Baldwin III in February 1157, Humphrey II of Toron, master of Banias and the surrounding country, had to face the Zengids. He quickly realized that his forces alone would not be enough and called upon the Hospitallers. He exchanged their participation for half of Banias and the castles that depended on this city. His army, composed mostly of infantry, was 700 strong, including the Hospitallers. But this did not prevent the defeat near Ras el Ma on April 24, which led to the conquest of Banias on 10 May 1157. They were only able to defend the castle, which Baldwin III was able to resupply in order to maintain a garrison there. On 19 June, the king was surprised on his way back through Jacob's Ford and routed. He managed to return to Safed and then to Acre. Nūr-ad-Din gave up his attack on Banias and returned to Aleppo, fearing an attack by Kilij Arslan II. Humphrey later sold Banias and the castle Chastel Neuf to the Hospitallers.

=== Administration of Crusader castles ===
Under his magisterium, the Order received numerous donations, notably from the County of Tripoli, to help defend the Holy Land against the Muslims. It was under Raymond du Puy's magisterium that the Hospitallers received the first of its Crusader castles. The Order also obtained numerous privileges and exemptions from the papacy, providing it with the financial resources necessary for its independence and giving it freedom from the diocesan authorities, much to their displeasure. The principal Hospitaller strongholds were the Krak des Chevaliers, their major fortress in the Levant, occupied from 1142 to 1271, and Margat on the Syrian coast, their other major redoubt from 1186 to 1285. The principal castles operated by the Hospitallers include the following

- Coliath (La Colée or Qalaat al-Qlaiaat), near the coast north of Tripoli, 1127–1207
- Qalansawe (Calanson), inland from Netanya, 1128–1187 and 1191–1265
- Bethgiblein (Beth Gibelin), northwest of Hebron, 1135–1187
- Krak des Chevaliers (Hisn al-Akrad), near Homs, 1142–1271
- Banias, near Mount Hermon, briefly around 1157
- Belmont Castle, near Jerusalem, c. 1160 – 1187
- Arab al-Mulk (Belda or Beaude), near Margat, c. 1160 – 1271
- Belvoir Castle (Kawkab al-Hawa), near the Sea of Galilee, 1168–1189
- Chastel Rouge (Qal’at Yahmur) on the Syrian coast, c. 1177 – 1289
- Margat (Marqab), south of Latakia, 1186–1285
- Qurfays (Corveis), near Margat, c. 1186 – 1271
- Le Forbelet, in the Valley of Megiddo, c. 1168 – 1187
- Castellum Beleismum (Chateau Saint-Job), southwest of Jenin, 1187–1189
- Qula, northeast of Ramla, 12th century
- Chastel Neuf, in northern Israel, 1210–
- Selefkeh, in south-central Turkey, 1210 – mid-13th century
- Çamardı, in central Anatolia, 1210 –
- Burgata, in central Israel, 1248–1265
- Tel Yokneam (Caymont or Cain Mons), southeast of Haifa, 1256–1262
- Tel Afek (Recordane), east of Haifa, 1154–1291
- Nephin, in northern Lebanon, 1282–1289.

These are well-documented by the extensive works of archaeologists of the Crusades including early works of those of the Palestine Exploration Fund, founded in 1865, and T. E. Lawrence. Later archaeologists include Moshe Sharon, Hugh Kennedy, David Nicolle and Denys Pringle.

=== Crusader invasion of Egypt ===
Raymond du Puy died in approximately 1160, either during his stay in Italy or on his return to the Holy Land. He was succeeded by Auger de Balben sometime in 1160, reflected by the issuance of his first act dated 29 November 1160. The magisterium of de Balben was short, with the last known mention of him is on 11 March 1162, and the first mention of his successor is on 19 January 1163. There are some references to Arnaud de Comps as the successor to Auger and older lists refer to him as the fourth Grand Master. He is today considered by some to be the master who never existed, but his name appears in the chronological lists placed at the head of the statutes, and he continues to be kept in the lists of Grand Masters.

Gilbert of Assailly was a French knight who became Grand Master of the Hospitallers in 1162 and it was under his magisterium that the Order became truly militarized. During his tenure the Order acquired territories in both the County of Tripoli and the Principality of Antioch. Two acts of donation in 1168 and 1170 highlighted a transfer of regal rights to the Hospitallers and recognized military privileges above the common law, giving them a form of quasi-sovereignty. They also purchased the land for the Belvoir Castle and otherwise expanded their fortifications. Gilbert began the regulation of the constitution of the Order, and the first verified appearance of the brothers-in-arms occurred from 1160 to 1163.

Gilbert is principally remembered for his actions related to the Crusader invasion of Egypt, particularly where he encouraged Amalric of Jerusalem to declare war on Egypt in order to expand territories of the kingdom. In the summer of 1164, a Frankish army accompanied by large contingents of Templars and Hospitallers was deployed. On 12 August 1164, this force was defeated at the Battle of Harim by Nūr-ad-Din, ruler of the Zengid dynasty. It was here that Raymond III of Tripoli was captured. Nūr-ad-Din pushed his advantage by taking the city of Banias on October 18, 1164, key to the passage between Tyre and Damascus. He later agreed to a treaty on the basis of half-sharing with the Christian troops of the territory of Tiberias.

In 1167, Shirkuh, an ally of Nūr-ad-Din, gathered an army in Syria and came to set up his camp at Giza, opposite Cairo. Amalric unsuccessfully tried to cut the road to Shirkuh and withdrew to Ascalon to complete the formation of his army, which included Hospitallers. On 30 January 1167, he began his offensive. Shawar, vizier to the sultan, allied with Amalric and allowed the Christian troops to enter Cairo. On 18 March 1167, the Crusaders were defeated at the Battle of al-Babein, and returned to Cairo. They then besieged Alexandria and, after 75 days of siege, Shirkuh sued for peace. He left the land to Shawar, returned to Syria with his army providing the Christians, a significant financial compensation.

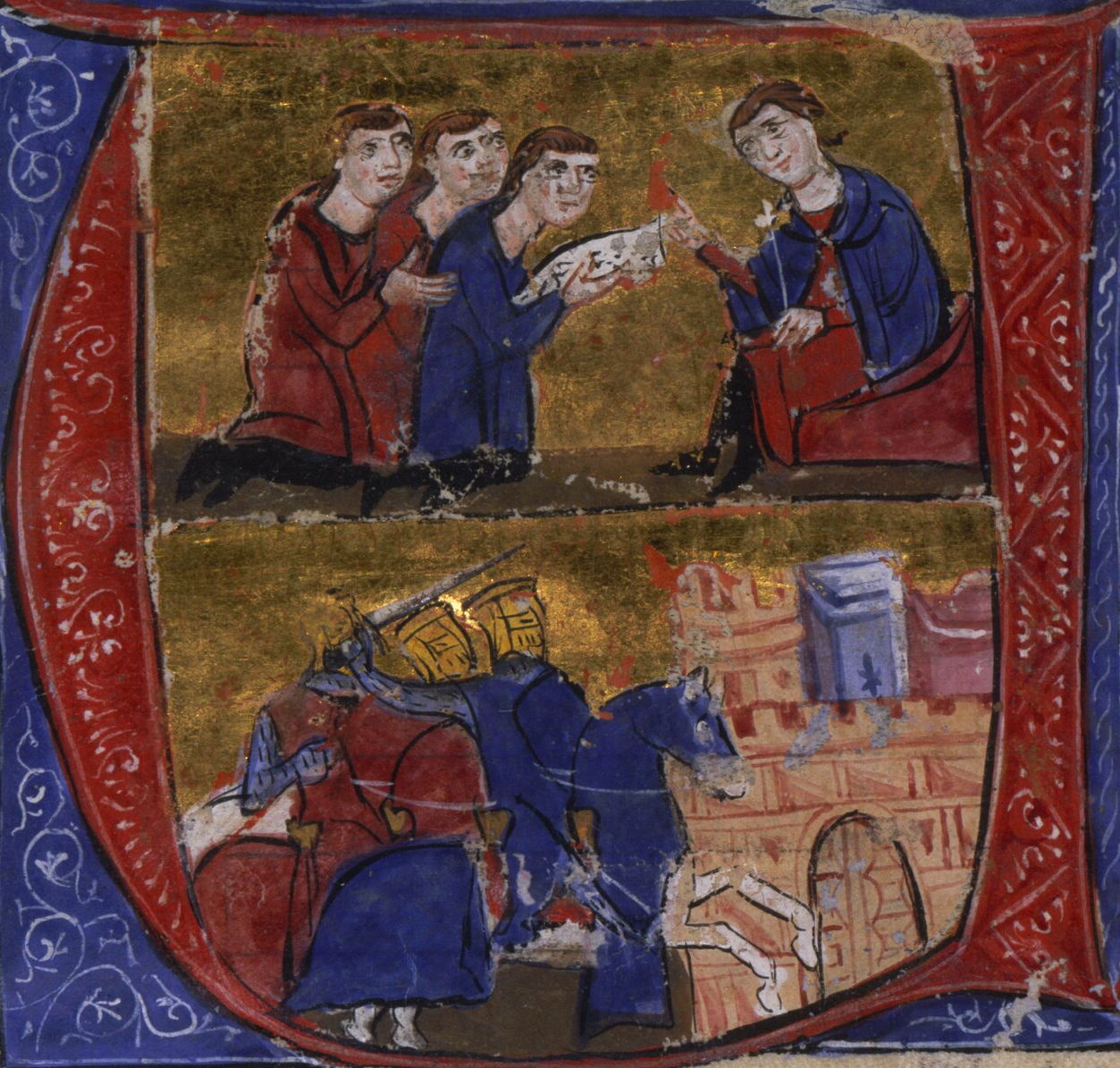
Manuel I Komnenos and the envoys of Amalric of Jerusalem, an embassy which resulted in the dispatch of the Byzantine force to invade Egypt. Arrival of the Crusaders in Egypt (William of Tyre's Historia).

Gilbert, still convinced that the conquest of Egypt would be a good thing, provided in October 1168 one thousand knights and turcopoliers to the army. In exchange he asked for Bilbeis and a vast territory between Syria and the sea. Amalric set out at the end of October. Reinforcements promised by Manuel I Komnenos had not yet arrived. On November 4, he seized Bilbeis and on November 13, he neared Cairo. The Egyptians were determined to defend themselves and a new alliance among Nūr-ad-Din, Shirkuh and Shawar was formed. After taking Tinnis, Amalric's fleet could not proceed up the Nile and was ordered to withdraw. On 2 January 1169, the troops of Jerusalem withdrew from Cairo.

Amalric decided to send an embassy to the West to ask for assistance. This group included archbishop Frederick de la Roche and Guy de Mauny, the Grand Commander of the Hospitallers. In July 1169, the embassy was at the papal courts of Alexander III; in September and November, at the royal court of Louis VII of France; and then at the court of Henry II of England. After two years of absence, the embassy returned to Jerusalem empty-handed.

In the fall of 1169, Amalric, with the help of the emperor and the Hospitallers, began his fourth campaign against Egypt. There again a financial treaty was made with the Hospitallers, with Bilbeis and the adjacent territory promised. The objective was Damietta, with the Greek and Frankish fleets laying siege by sea and by land at the end of October. But the expedition failed once more, and returned to Tyre on 7 December 1169.

The latest expedition was a disaster, with Gilbert receiving much of the blame, rendering his position became untenable. Accused of having ruined the Order and neglecting its charitable vocation, he resigned, but then reconsidered. Heraclius of Jerusalem, as archdeacon of Jerusalem in 1169, tried unsuccessfully to persuade Alexander III to reinstate Gilbert. He was succeeded by Gastone de Murols, then Hospitaller Treasurer, who served an unnoteworthy term from 1170 to 1172. His election was not recognized by all the Order's knights, resulting in the first conflict in the Order's leadership.

In 1171, Amalric left the Holy Land to visit Constantinople and he entrusted a Hospitaller named Jobert of Syria with the guardianship of his son Baldwin IV of Jerusalem as well as the regency of the kingdom. After Jobert became Grand Master in 1172, he successfully intervened to obtain the liberation of Raymond III of Tripoli, a prisoner of Nūr-ad-Din since his capture at Harim in 1164. Raymond borrowed from the Hospitallers in order to pay his ransom. In July 1174, Amalric died and the seneschal Miles de Plancy became regent to Baldwin IV. The next month, Jobert refused to commit to aiding Miles and Tancred of Sicily in their attack on Egypt. In December he joined the new regent Raymond in a planned attack on Saladin, now sultanHe and his forces were with the army that menaced Homs after Saladin had taken it. No battle was fought and the Franks left in exchange for the release of hostages and remission of ransoms.

=== Saladin and the Third Crusade ===
Jobert's magisterium ended with his death in 1177, and he was succeeded as Grand Master by Roger de Moulins. At that time, the Hospitallers formed one of the strongest military organizations of the kingdom, diverging from the origin mission of the Order. Among Roger's first actions was to urge Baldwin IV of Jerusalem to continue to vigorously prosecute the war against Saladin and, in November 1177, he participated in the Battle of Montgisard, winning a victory against the Ayyubids. Pope Alexander III called them back to the observance of the rule of Raymond du Puy between 1178 and 1180, issuing a bull that forbade them to take up arms unless they were attacked and urged them not to abandon the care of those sick and in poverty. Alexander III persuaded Roger to make a truce in 1179 with the Templar Odo de St Amand, then Grand Master, also a veteran of Montgisard.

In 1184, Roger toured Europe with Odo's successor Arnold of Torroja and Latin patriarch Heraclius to plead with pope Lucius III to call for a new Crusade. After the death of Baldwin V of Jerusalem in August 1186, Roger opposed the ascension of Sibylla of Jerusalem and Guy of Lusignan to the throne and at first refused to hand over his key to the royal treasury when they were crowned in 1186. This placed him at odds with both Raynald de Châtillon and Templar Grand Master Gerard de Ridefort.

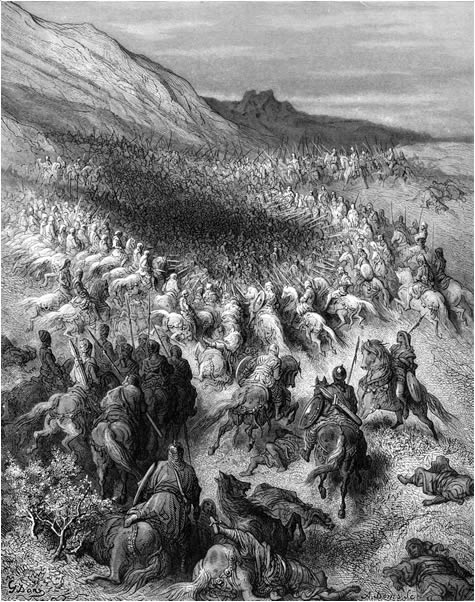
Battle of Hattin by Gustave Doré

At the end of 1186, Raynald de Châtillon, in defiance of the truce with Saladin, had captured a caravan going from Cairo to Damascus with the sister of the emir. The barons, gathered in Jerusalem by Guy de Lusignan, on 27 March 1187, had demanded that a reconciliation take place between Lusignan and Raymond III of Tripoli. Roger, Gerard de Ridefort, archbishop Joscius, Balian of Ibelin, and Renaud Grenier were appointed to negotiate with Raymond III in Tiberias when they had to face Muslim troops. Due to the foolish pride of Gerard de Ridefort, the kingdom engaged in the disastrous Battle of Cresson against Saladin on 1 May 1187, where Roger was killed by a spear wound. De Ridefort survived the battle but the Templar Marshall Robert Fraisnel was also killed. Roger was succeeded ad interim by William Borrel, who had served as Grand Commander for a brief time in 1187. Borrel appointed Armengol de Aspa as his successor as Grand Commander.

On 2 July 1187, Saladin laid siege to Tiberias, capturing the city. After her castle fell, the Hospitaller commanders advised Guy of Lusignan not to provoke Saladin. But again on the advice of the Templars, particularly Gerard de Ridefort, the army set out to rescue the city. On 4 July, an army led by Raymond III of Tripoli was surprised at the Battle of Hattin. From the beginning, the Templars and Hospitallers could not withstand the attack. They asked Guy de Lusignan, for urgent help. Reinforcements were slow in coming and the defeat became a rout, with only a few escaping. The rest were killed, including William Borrel. The king and a number of nobles of the kingdom fell into the hands of the Ayyubids. The next day, Saladin put to death all the Hospitallers and Templars in captivity with the exception of Gerard de Ridefort. Hospitaller knight Nicasius of Sicily, later venerated as a martyr, is said to have been one of Saladin's victims. The king and most of the other captured nobles were taken to Damascus, to be released for ransom. The exception was Raynald de Châtillon who was beheaded by Saladin himself, exacting his revenge on Raynald's numerous offenses.

Armengol de Aspa was elevated to Grand Master ad Interim after the death of William Borrel. The Muslim victory at Hattin opened the road to Jerusalem, with Saladin arriving there on 17 September, beginning the Siege of Jerusalem three days later. The city was defended by a few knights and a small garrison of Hospitallers and Templars under the orders of Balian of Ibelin, then the highest-ranking lord in the city. They capitulated on 2 October 1187 and the Christians were allowed to evacuate the city in exchange for a ransom. The evacuation took place in three groups, the first under the orders of the Templars, the second under those of the Hospitallers and the last under the orders of the Latin patriarch Heraclius of Jerusalem and Balian of Ibelin. They were escorted to the borders of the county of Tripoli. Ten friars of the Order were allowed to remain in Jerusalem to care for the wounded and sick.

The Franks remained under attack at the Siege of Tyre, and Saladin came in person on 11 November 1187 to reinforce and support his troops. Armengol de Aspa led the Hospitallers in the defense alongside the Templars. By the beginning of 1188, the Franks had lost Judea, Samaria and Galilee, but retained Tyre. The castle at Margat was so difficult to assault that Saladin did not attempt a siege there. The Hospitallers had been defending Belvoir Castle since August 1187 and, on 2 January 1188, they left the fortress and decimated the Muslim troops, killing Saladin's general-in-charge Sayf al-Din Mahmūd and captured a large cache of arms. To the east, beyond the Jordan, al-Adil I, brother of Saladin, attacked the castles of Krak des Chevaliers and Montreal, both of which surrendered for lack of supplies at the end of September 1188. The Siege of Safed, taking the castle belonging to the Templars saw its capitulation on November 30. The Hospitallers held out until 3 January 1189 at Belvoir Castle, and only famine was able to overcome their resistance.

Late in 1189, Armengol de Aspa abdicated and a new Grand Master was not chosen until Garnier of Nablus was elected in 1190. Garnier had been seriously injured at Hattin in 1187, but managed to reach Ascalon and recovered from his wounds. He was in Paris through that time waiting for Richard I of England to depart on the Third Crusade. He arrived in Messina on 23 September where he met Philippe Auguste and Robert IV de Sablé, soon to be Grand Master of the Templars. Among the Hospitallers in the force was the Italian Ugo Canefri.

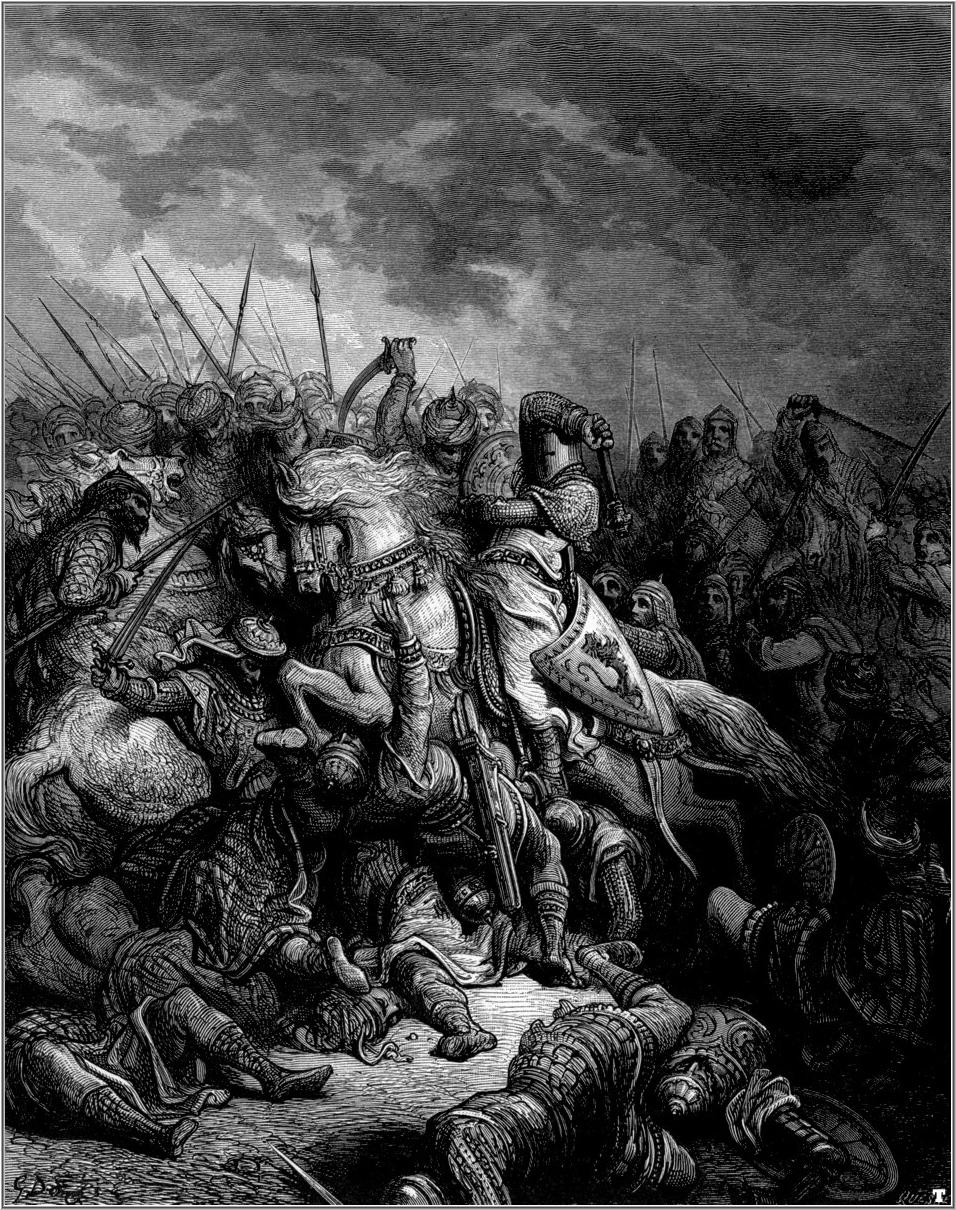
Richard the Lionheart and Saladin at the Battle of Arsuf, by Gustave Doré

Garnier left Messina on 10 April 1191 with Richard's fleet, which then anchored on 1 May at the port of Lemesos. Richard subdued the island on 11 May despite the mediation of Garnier. They set sail again on 5 June and arrived in Acre, under Ayyubid control since 1187. There they found Philippe Auguste leading the Siege of Acre, a two-year attempt to dislodge the Muslims. The besiegers eventually got the upper hand and, under the helpless eyes of Saladin, the Muslim defenders capitulated on 12 July 1191.

On 22 August 1191, Richard travelled south to Arsuf. The Templars formed the vanguard and the Hospitallers at the rear-guard. Richard travelled with an elite force ready to intervene where necessary. The Hospitallers came under attack on September 7, at the beginning of the Battle of Arsuf. Situated at the rear of the military column, Garnier's knights were under heavy pressure by the Muslims and he rode forward to persuade Richard to attack, which he refused. Finally, Garnier and another knight charged forward, and were soon joined by the rest of the Hospitaller force. Richard, despite the fact that his orders had been disobeyed, signaled for a full charge. This caught the enemy at a vulnerable moment, and their ranks were broken. Garnier thus played a large part in winning the battle, though in contravention of Richard's orders.

== The Hospitallers and the Crusades through 1254 ==
Garnier of Nablus died in the second half of 1192 and his successor Geoffroy de Donjon assumed the position of Grand Master shortly thereafter. Geoffroy would serve until 1202, but would not commit the Order to supporting the Crusade of 1197 nor the Fourth Crusade. In the summer of 1202, he was with papal legate Soffredo Gaetani during a trip attempting to reconcile issues in the succession of rulers in the Principality of Antioch. On 23 March 1203, the second voyage to Antioch took place, but without Geoffroy de Donjon, who had vanished. Instead, the Order was represented by Pierre de Mirmande who became ad interim Grand Master, and the Templars by Grand Master Philippe du Plessis. De Mirmande had been Châtelain of the Krac des Chevaliers and was Grand Commander when briefly elevated. He was soon formally replaced as Grand Master by Fernando Afonso of Portugal. Fernando Afonso was the illegitimate son of Afonso I of Portugal and had been a senior member of the Hospitallers in Iberia. He resigned in 1206, the first Grand Master to do so, and was replaced by Geoffroy le Rat. Le Rat died in 1207 after serving a short, unremarkable term.

=== War of the Antiochene Succession ===
Guérin de Montaigu was elected Grand Master in the summer of 1207. He was described as "the figure of one of the greatest masters of whom the Hospital has reason to be proud." He is believed to be the brother of Pierre de Montaigu who served as Templar Grand Master from 1218 to 1232. Like his two predecessors, Montaigu found himself involved in the affairs of Antioch in the War of the Antiochene Succession, begun with the opening of the will of Bohémond III of Antioch. The will directed his grandson Raymond-Roupen as successor. Bohémond IV of Antioch, second son of Bohémond III and Count of Tripoli, did not accept this will. Leo I of Armenia, as the maternal great-uncle, took the side of Raymond-Roupen. However, without waiting for the death of his father, Bohémond IV had taken possession of the principality. The Templars had aligned themselves with the bourgeoisie of Antioch and az-Zahir Ghazi, the Ayyubid sultan of Aleppo, while the Hospitallers sided with Raymond-Roupen and the king of Armenia.

When de Montaigu took over the Hospitallers, nothing had changed. Leo I of Armenia had made himself master of Antioch and had re-established his grand-nephew there. But it was of short duration, and as the Count of Tripoli remained master of the city. Leo I supported his claims by confiscating the Templars' property in Cilicia, ruining Antioch's trade by raids, and even risking excommunication in 1210–1213. An agreement was reached between the king and the Templars, and the excommunication was revoked. On 14 February 1216, Antioch was put in the hands of Leo I and of his nephew Raymond-Roupen. The Antiochene nobility allowed the return of Bohémond IV and the escape of Raymon-Roupen, who later died in 1222.

Bohémond IV exacted his revenge on the Hospitallers, taking back the castle of Antioch from them and their possessions of Tripoli were undermined. Honorius III interceded in their favor in 1225 and 1226, and his successor Gregory IX excommunicated Bohémond IV in 1230. He authorized Gerald of Lausanne, the Latin patriarch of Jerusalem, to lift the ban if Bohémond agreed to make peace with the Hospitallers. With the mediation of Gerald and the Ibelins, Bohemond and the Hospitallers agreed to a treaty which was signed on 26 October 1231. Bohémond confirmed the Hospitallers' right to hold Jabala and a nearby fortress and granted them money fiefs in both Tripoli and Antioch. The Hospitallers renounced the privileges that Raymond-Roupen had granted to them. Before long, Gerald of Lausanne lifted the excommunication and sent the treaty to Rome to be confirmed by the Holy See.

=== The Fifth Crusade ===
Guérin de Montaigu and the Hospitallers played a major role in the Fifth Crusade. After the first wave of troops arrived at Acre in the late summer of 1217, de Montaigu brought Leopold VI of Austria, Hugh I of Cyprus, and Andrew II of Hungary to Cyprus at the request of Innocent III. John of Brienne gathered them together in the presence of the three Grand Masters––Guérin de Montaigu, Pierre de Montaigu, and Hermann of Salza––for a council of war and to determine the course of action to be taken in Syria. They first attacked the fortress of Mount Tabor, which had to be abandoned, and later laid siege to Sidon, which was then refurbished. These were the only two significant actions taken from November to December 1217. The Crusaders ended their Syrian campaign and returned to Acre. The king of Hungary, giving in to discouragement, returned to Hungary in January 1218.

The arrival of new pilgrims from Friesland and the north of Germany revived the Crusade. Before the winter of 1218, with the help of the Hospitallers, they re-established the fortifications of Caesarea and, with the Templars, the Château Pèlerin. But this was not enough to keep everyone busy, and an expedition to Egypt was decided. The Crusaders, the Latin patriarch Raoul of Merencourt, the prelates of the Holy Land, and the Grand Masters, were all under the orders of the king of Jerusalem, John of Brienne. They embarked from Acre in May 1218, beginning the invasion of Egypt in June. In a skirmish on 22 August 1219, Hospitaller Marshal Aymar de Lairon fell with thirty two of his companions. The Siege of Damietta was successfully completed in November 1219, and de Montaigu distinguished himself in battle. Placed in a critical position after the Battle of Mansurah in August 1221, the Crusading force negotiated with the Muslims on 30 August 1221 the evacuation of Damietta and the return to Acre. Thus the Fifth Crusade ended in failure.

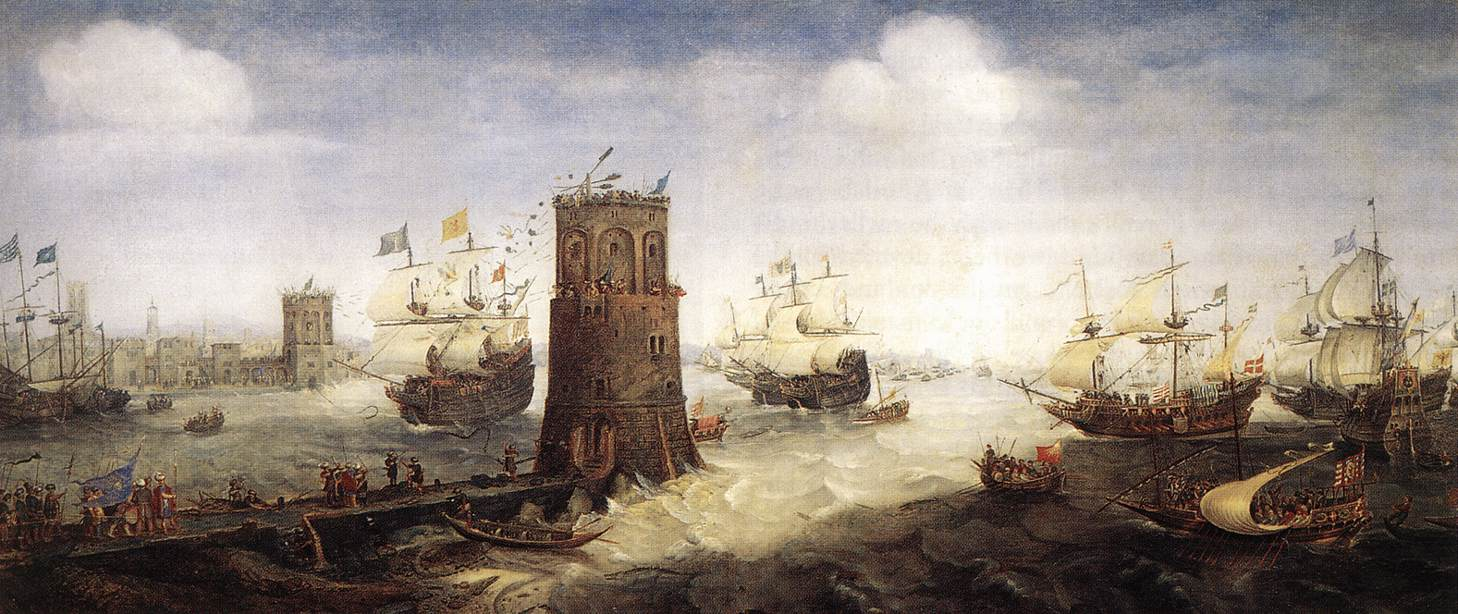
Crusaders attack the tower of Damietta in a painting by Cornelis Claesz van Wieringen.

=== The Sixth Crusade ===
In 1222, emperor Frederick II sent four ships to Acre to transport John of Brienne, Raoul of Merencourt, the legate Pelagius Galvano and the Grand Masters to Sicily to confer with him concerning his promise to go on aCrusade. They embarked for Brindisi in September 1222 and met with the pope in Rome in January 1223. They had an interview with Frederick in Ferentino from 17 February to 26 March 1223, where Frederick committed to leave for the Holy Land in 1225. John of Brienne and de Montaigu continued their journey to France and England to ask for royal help, with no perceptible effect. Then the two separated, with de Montaigu going on to Bordeaux, returning to headquarters via Armenia. On his return to Palestine, he found turmoil and he tried vainly to reconcile the Hospitallers with the Templars. In 1228, he persuaded Gregory IX to break the truce holding between Christian and Muslim powers, but refused to serve in the army commanded by the excommunicated Frederick II.

Guérin de Montaigu died in Palestine in 1228 and was succeeded by Bertrand de Thessy. Bertrand's election as Grand Master corresponds to the arrival of Frederick in the Holy Land. Frederick had been excommunicated in September 1227 and the pope asked the new Latin patriarch Gérold of Lausanne to promulgate the sentence of excommunication and to direct the three military orders to deny him obedience. Bertrand and the Templar Pierre de Montaigu refused to recognize him as king of Jerusalem, despite his marriage to Isabella II of Jerusalem in August 1225. Hermann of Salza, unused to disobedience of a German sovereign, fully supported the emperor.

At the outset of the Sixth Crusade, Frederick led a small contingent south from Acre and in November 1228 took control of Jaffa. He was followed by the Templars and the Hospitallers one day's journey back, respecting the pope's position. They also viewed Frederick's engaging with the sultan al-Kamil in the midst of his troops negatively. Lacking a strong army, the emperor was not looking for confrontation but for negotiation. The negotiations began at the Hospitaller camp at Tel Afek, ending successfully on 18 February 1229, resulting in Jerusalem, Bethlehem and Nazareth being returned to the Franks. This ten-year, six-month and ten-day peace treaty was to begin on 24 February 1229. In fact, it was better on the parchment it was written than it was in reality, as the Muslims kept key strategic points. The emperor had achieved the goal of Jerusalem, allowing him to return to the Holy City and be crowned as king. On 18 March 1229, Frederick crowning himself, as no one wished to violate the papal orders. Returning to Acre in the face of hostility, he embarked for Italy on 1 May 1229.

Bertrand de Thessy, the Templars, and patriarch Gérold of Lausanne representing the clergy of the Holy Land refused to accept the treaty as Antioch and Tripoli were excluded from the considerations. No effort had been made to protect the interests of these Crusader states. A further problem was the decision to leave two Christian shrines to the Muslims––the Temple of Our Lord (Mosque of Omar) and the Temple of Solomon (al-Aqsa Mosque). In addition, Gregory IX issued a papal bull in August 1229 to the Latin patriarch directing that the Hospitallers maintain jurisdiction over the Teutonic Knights in punishment for their following Frederick. The Hospitallers and Templars took advantage of the fact that they were excluded from the treaty and, in the fall of 1229, led a successful incursion into the north of the country against the Muslims of the fortress of Montferrand and a disastrous expedition to Hama in July and August 1230. Hope returned when Frederick obtained from the pope relief from his excommunication on 28 August 1230 at the Treaty of Ceprano, and he returned to the Hospitallers and the Templars the goods confiscated in Sicily.

=== The Order and the politics of the Holy Land, 1230–1244 ===
Bertrand de Thessy died at Acre in 1231 and was succeeded by Guérin Lebrun. In 1233, the Hospitallers under Guérin took a leading part in the successful attack on the principality of Hama. The motive of this conflict was no more than the refusal of the emir to pay them the tribute due—seems to point to an increasing secularization of their spirit. The army gathered in the plain of the Beqaa Valley, at the foot of Krak des Chevaliers. It included Hospitallers, a Templar force under Armand de Périgord, and local knights under John of Ibelin and Henry of Antioch. They pillaged Montferrand and its surroundings, returning without incident.

Guérin died after May 1236 and his successor as Grand Master was Bertrand de Comps. The Order at least twice began negotiating an alliance with the enemies of the Franks of the Holy Land, the Ayyubids. Gregory IX threatened excommunication and also accused them of wanting to come to an understanding with the Assassins against Bohemond V of Antioch with whom they were in open hostilities. He reproached them for paying tribute in exchange for their protection. On 13 March 1238, he formulated a new accusation against the Hospitallers, accusing them of a scandalous life and lax discipline. He accused them of supporting John III Doukas Vatatzes, son-in-law of Théodore Lascaris, the proclaimed emperor of Nicaea, by threatening the faltering domination of the emperors of Constantinople.

Bertrand de Comps died as early as April 1239 and was succeeded by Pierre de Vieille-Brioude. Bertrand had died during the Barons' Crusade and de Vieille-Brioude was then Grand Commander of the Hospitallers. He was accompanying Theobald I of Navarre and his forces when they left France for the Holy Land in August 1239. Representing the Hospitallers, Templars and Teutonic Knights, de Vieille-Brioude advised Theobald against marching to Gaza to fight the sultan of Damascus, al-Salih Ismail. Ignoring their advice, he marched forward and at the Battle of Gaza on 13 November 1239, Theobald suffered such a bloody defeat there that de Vieille-Brioude and Armand de Périgord, had, with great difficulty, dissuaded him from attacking the next day at the risk of turning a defeat into a rout. He fell back to Jaffa and Ascalon.

By the summer of 1240, de Vieille-Brioude was now Grand Master and gave consideration to the proposal of al-Salih Ismail who wanted to reconquer Damascus. The sultan offered the Franks the restitution of Safed, Beaufort Castle, the territories between Sidon and Tiberias, and those below the Jordan. These were divided between the two orders. Theobald, in the absence of the Hospitallers and a large number of Crusaders, had allied his remaining forces with al-Salih Ismail, who was to be defeated in his reconquest of Damascus. Theobald then fell back to Ascalon, implementing new fortifications, and leaving the Holy Land in September 1240.

Shortly after the departure of Theobald, an English host arrived at Acre on 11 October 1240 led by Richard of Cornwall. He completed the fortifications of Ascalon in March 1241 when the treaty with the Ayyubids was presented for Richard's ratification. Richard, on the advice of de Vieille-Brioude, Hugh of Burgundy and Walter of Jaffa, ratified the treaty on 23 April 1241 and returned to England on May 3. Richard did not have great esteem for the Templars and the Hospitallers, who charged with defending the Holy Land, competing for their wealth instead of putting it at the service of the salvation of the kingdom. In his view, they were oblivious to the pope's orders, and were always ready to fight against each other. The conflict began as soon as Richard departed, with the Templars, refusing the truce initiated by Richard, attacked the Hospitallers and the Teutonic Order, who had accepted it. Armand de Périgord led the Templars in besieged them at Acre, cutting off their food, and to prevent them from burying their dead outside their convent. This occurred in the absence of de Vieille-Brioude who was fighting in Margat against an-Nasir Yusuf of Aleppo.

== The Loss of the Levant, 1244–1291 ==
Pierre de Vieille-Brioude died in 1242 and was succeeded by Guillaume de Chateauneuf, a French knight who joined the Order in 1233, becoming Marshal in 1241. When de Chateauneuf took over as Grand Master, the Ayyubids had just left Jerusalem to the Christians. The Kingdom of Jerusalem was at its largest size since 1187. But these gains would be dramatically reversed within a few years.

=== The loss of Jerusalem and Battle of La Forbie ===
The Templars began fortifying the city of Jerusalem in 1244 when the Khwarezmian invasion occurred, a force summoned by as-Salih Ayyub, the sultan of Egypt. They seized Tiberias, Safed and Tripoli and began the Siege of Jerusalem on 15 July 1244. Because of the agreement between Frederick II and al-Kamil, the walls were inadequately fortified and unable to withstand the attack. The patriarch of Jerusalem Robert of Nantes and the leaders of the Templars and Hospitallers came to support the city's inhabitants and initially repelled the attackers. The imperial Castellan and the Grand Commander of the Hospital died in the battle, but no help from the Franks was coming. The defenders turned to their nearest ally, an-Nasir Dā’ūd, emir of Kerak, who cowed the Khwarezmanians into allowing safe-passage to the defenders. In the confusion, the inhabitants left Jerusalem, but looked back and saw the banners of the Christians flying on the city walls. Thusly deceived, they turned back and were all massacred, while the city was sacked.

A combined force was assembled, consisting of Templars, the Hospitallers and Teutonic Knights, joining a Muslim army of Syrians and Transjordanians under al-Mansur Ibrahim and an-Nasir Dā’ūd. This army was placed under the command of Walter IV of Brienne and left Acre, now the headquarters of the Order, and departed on 4 October 1244. They fell on the Khwarezmians and the Egyptian troops commanded by Baibars, future sultan of Egypt, on 17 October. In the Battle of La Forbie near Gaza, the Muslim allies of the Franks dropped out at the first encounter with the enemy and the Christians found themselves alone. The unequal fighting ended in disaster––16,000 men died and 800 were taken prisoner, among them 325 knights and 200 turcopoliers of the Hospitallers. Guillaume de Chateauneuf himself was captured and taken to Cairo. Only 18 Templars and 16 Hospitallers managed to escape.

It was then that Jean de Ronay, the Grand Commander, took over as Grand Master ad Interim, awaiting the release of de Chateauneuf. After the La Forbie campaign, only the castles of Safed and Ascalon had defended themselves against the onslaught. Ascalon was guarded by the Hospitallers and resisted Baibars' attack. The Khwarezmians continued to attack Acre and Jaffa. In the fall of 1245, it was the capture of Damascus by Egyptian troops aided by the Khwarezmians that which put Egypt and Syria in the hands of as-Salih Ayyub. In 1246, Muslim troops began unsuccessful sieges of Ascalon, Acre and the Templar stronghold of Château Pèlerin. Tiberias was captured on June 16, 1247, and shortly thereafter Ascalon fell.

Latin patriarch Robert of Nantes had been present at La Forbie, barely escaping. In 1247 he sent a relic of the Holy Blood to Henry III of England in an ultimately unsuccessful attempt to convince him to go to the Holy Land. The authenticity of the relic was attested to by the seals of the Grand Masters of the Hospitallers and Templars. Henry had received numerous such relics from the Hospitallers since 1235, including pieces of the burning bush, a footprint of Christ and a spine of the Cross of Thorns.

=== Seventh Crusade and its aftermath ===
The loss of Jerusalem and the defeat at La Forbie essentially eliminated Western military power in the Holy Land. Louis IX of France was compelled to respond, taking the cross in December 1244, leading in the Seventh Crusade. He went to sea from Aigues-Mortes on 25 August 1248, disembarking in Cyprus three weeks later. He arrived with the queen Margaret of Provence and his brothers Charles I of Anjou and Robert I of Artois. Awaiting at Cyprus was Henry I of Cyprus and the representatives of the military orders, Jean de Ronay for the Hospitallers, and Guillaume de Sonnacfor the Templars.

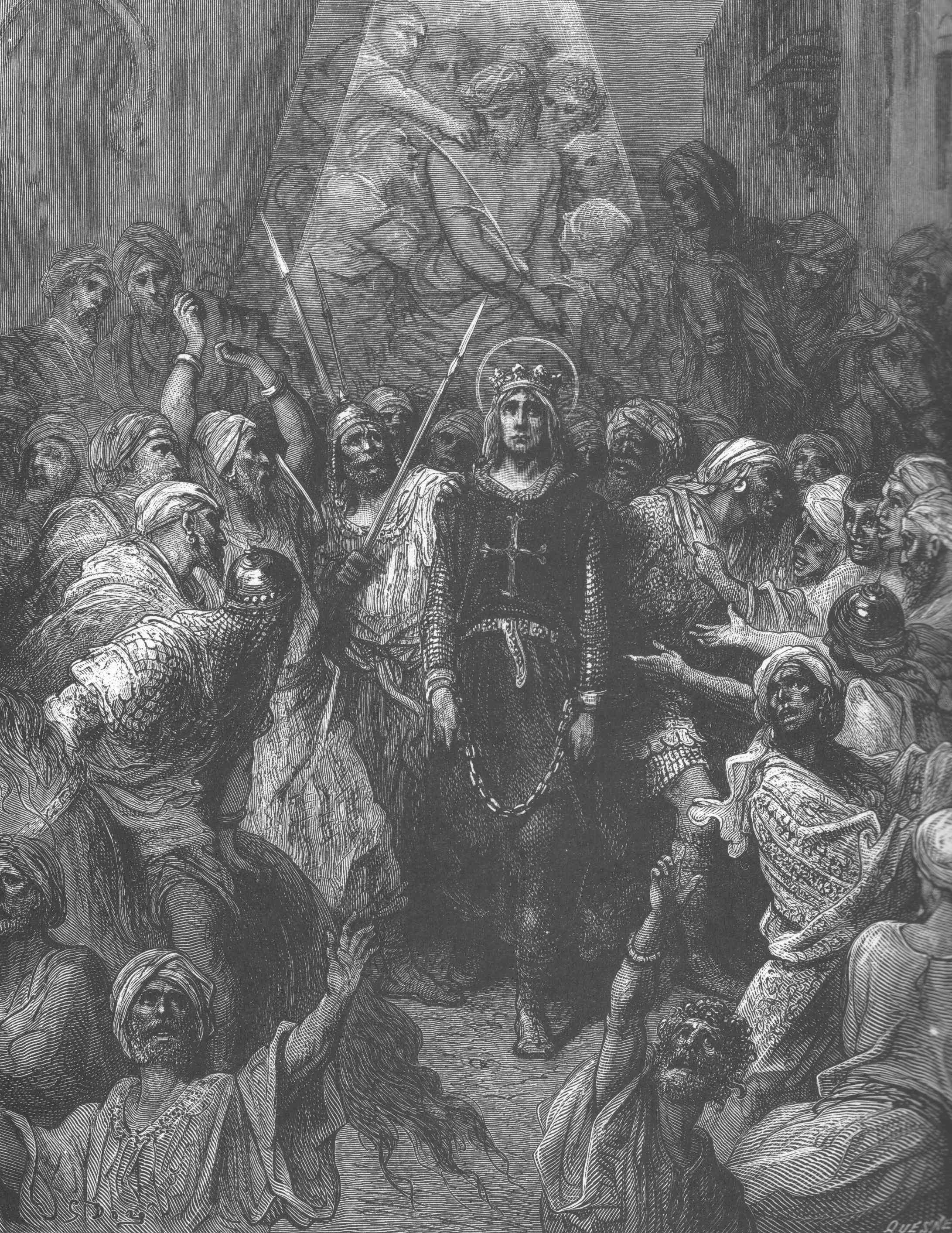
Louis IX being taken prisoner at the Battle of Fariskur (Gustave Doré)

After landing in Egypt, the Crusader force met with initial successes at the Siege of Damietta on 6 June 1249 and at the Battle of Mansurah on 8 February 1250. It was in the fighting after the latter battle had been decided that de Ronay was killed. During the Battle of Fariskur on 6 April 1250 disaster struck the Frankish forces. Louis and many other were captured.

After the disastrous results of the Crusade (which included the death of many leaders of the Hospitallers), Louis IX returned to Acre on 13 May 1250. He was urged on all sides to return to France, but he did not want to leave the Holy Land until he had secured the release of the prisoners. To hasten their release, he twice delegated Jean de Valencienne, a canon from Acre, who obtained the release of a large number of prisoners, including Guillaume de Chateauneuf and twenty five Hospitallers. The freed men arrived in Acre on 17 October 1250.

After his release, Guillaume de Chateauneuf returned to the leadership of the Hospitallers. In 1254, a ten-year truce was concluded between Aybak, effectively ruler of Egypt, an-Nasir Yusuf, sultan of Damascus, and West, including the Hospitallers, Templars, barons of the Holy Land, Geoffrey of Sergines, a representative of Louis IX, and John of Ibelin. But internal conflicts of the Christians continued. The Genoese and the Venetians had shared possession of the Church of Saint Sabas, and each wanted exclusive possession, leading to the War of Saint Sabas. The pope thought he had solved the problem by committing the abbot to sell the church to the Genoese, but then reversed his decision. Those who had sided with the rights of Hugh II of Lusignan rallied around the Venetians, including the Templars, and those who had sided with Conradin, including the Hospitallers, rallied around the Genoese. The Hospitallers waited for the success of the Genoese fleet around Acre with the contingent gathered by Philippe de Montfort. But, on 24 June 1258, it was the failure of the Genoese fleet, the Venetians ruin their district in Acre by sharing it and the prisoners are led to Tyre. This marked the end of hostilities.

Guillaume de Chateauneuf died in 1258 and was succeeded by Hugues de Revel. De Revel strengthened the Hospitaller domain by acquiring the Benedictine abbey on Mount Tabor, but the consent of archbishop Henry of Nazareth was not obtained until 1263. He also had direct contact with Baibars multiple times through 1268, but did not take sides in the First Battle of Homs in 1260. In March 1265, 270 Hospitallers repelled the Siege of Arsuf by the Mamluk army lasted for forty days, resulting in the town being razed and its surviving inhabitants sold into slavery. This led the Hospitallers to negotiate a separate truce for the Krak des Chevaliers and the fortress of Margat in 1267, but Baibars' armies caused the Fall of Krak des Chevaliers in 1271, which did not prevent de Revel from negotiating a truce the same year. Margat would remain in Hospitaller hands until 1285.

=== Political intrigue in the Kingdom ===
Hugues de Revel died in 1277 and his successor Nicolas Lorgne, formerly Castellan of the Krak des Chevaliers, became Grand Master by June 1278. Lorgne immediately involved himself in the politics of the kingdom. The claim of Hugh III of Lusignan to the throne of Jerusalem was contested by Maria of Antioch, who had ceded her claims to Charles I of Anjou. Charles appointed Roger of San Severino to administer the kingdom as his bailiff. San Severino landed at Acre on 7 June 1277. Hugh III's bailiff, Balian of Arsuf, surrendered the town without resistance. Although initially only the Hospitallers and the Venetians acknowledged Charles as the lawful ruler, the barons of the realm also paid homage to San Severino after he had threatened to confiscate their estates. The Mamluks had already confined the kingdom to a small coastal strip and Charles had ordered San Severino to avoid conflicts with Egypt.

In 1278, Guy II Embriaco and the Templars assaulted Tripoli, but were met outside the walls by Bohemond VII of Tripoli. Bohemond was defeated, but the Templar fleet was scattered by a storm and Bohemond's fleet attacked and damaged the Templar positions, and a truce was mediated by Lorgne. The last conflict began in January 1282, when the Embriacos tried to take Tripoli by surprise, expecting to be greeted by their Templar allies. They soon discovered that Grand Master Guillaume de Beaujeu was absent and so sought refuge with the Hospitallers, who handed them over to Bohemond on condition that he would spare their lives. Guy's friends were blinded, but Bohemond had the Embriaco family taken to the castle at Nephin and buried up to their necks in sand in the moat. This last act further alienated the Genoese and John of Montfort, but Bohemund beat the latter in taking control of Byblos.

=== The Mongols and Mamluks ===
Nicolas Lorgne's policy towards the Mongols was perhaps more personal. In 1280, the Mongol invasion of Syria was met without serious resistance from the Mamluk defenders. The Hospitallers took advantage of the total disorganization that prevailed, made a sortie from the fortress of Margat with 200 knights and raided the region to take considerable booty. At the end of October 1280, on their way back, they faced a troop of 5,000 Turkoman horsemen whom they routed (losing only one sergeant-at-arms) despite their numerical inferiority. In February 1281, the emir of the Krak des Chevaliers, now under Badr al-Din Solamish, wanted revenge and attacked the Hospitallers with 7,000 horsemen. The Order deployed 600 horsemen and the emir's defeat was complete. The Hospitallers lost but one knight and 12 sergeants.

The death of Baibars in July 1277 was a cause of rejoice in the kingdom. The new sultan of Egypt al-Mansûr Qalawun had quickly usurped Baibars' sons and made an agreement with the Mamluk na'ib of Damascus, Sunqur al-Ashqar, on 24 June 1281. He also concluded a truce with the Hospitallers at Acre and Bohemond VII to last over 10 years. The Hospitallers at Margat did not respect this treaty and joined the Mongol forces of Möngke Temür. After the defeat of the Mongols at the bloody Second Battle of Homs on 29 October 1281, Qalawun announced that he was going to take revenge for the failure of Margat. A letter from English Hospitaller Joseph of Chauncy to Edward I of England described the battle. The Hospitallers accumulated supplies and forces in the fortress of Margat and improved the defenses, but this did not prevent them from deploying a contingent of 100 horsemen composed of 50 lances taken from among the knights and 50 turcopoliers to the king of Armenia.

On 17 April 1285, in spite of the agreement of peace, Qalawun attacked Margat. He set fire to a part of the walls and at the moment of taking advantage of the breach thus created the tower of Hope collapsed and came to obstruct the breach on May 23. The Hospitallers negotiated their surrender and Margat capitulated on May 25. They were allowed to leave with 2,000 gold coins and what 25 mules could carry. They left for Tripoli and Tortosa. Rather than destroy Margat as he did with other fortresses, Qalawun repaired its defences and placed a strong garrison there due to its strategic value

=== The loss of Acre ===
We are not certain that Nicolas Lorgne knew the fall of Margat as he died within weeks of the surrender of the fortress. Grand Commander Jacques de Taxi was appointed Grand Master ad interim prior to the arrival of Lorgne's successor Jean de Villiers in the Holy Land during the fall of 1286. On 17 March 1289, the Mamluks began the Siege of Tripoli. All the Christian forces were mobilized, including the Hospitallers, Templars and those led by Amaury de Lusignan. The destruction of the tower of the Hospitallers sealed the fate of the city on 26 April 1289. The role of de Villiers remains uncertain, but the strongholds of Nephin, in the Hospitallers' domain, and Batroun fell into the hands of the Mamluks. The only Frankish enclaves in the Holy Land that remained were Acre, Haïfa, Sidon, Tyre and Beirut. The death of al-Mansur Qalawun left a respite for the Christians, but his son al-Ashraf Khalil had sworn to his father to take Acre.

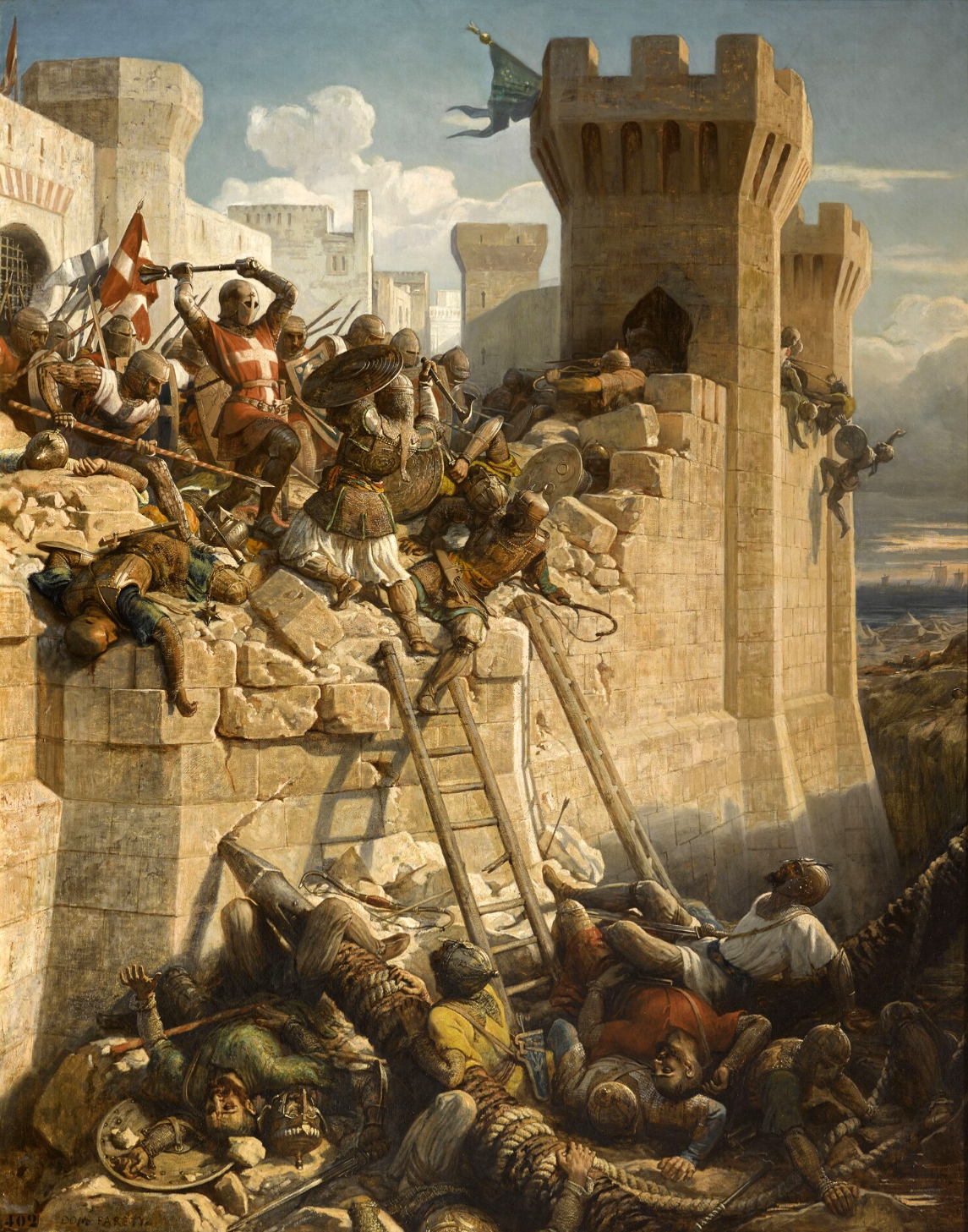
The Hospitaller Maréchal defending the walls at the siege of Acre, 1291. By Dominique Papety. In Musée de l'Histoire de France, Château de Versailles.

The forces facing the Mamluks at the Siege of Acre in 1291 were divided into four components. The first were the forces of Jean de Grailly and Otto de Grandson. The second was led by Henry II of Cyprus and Konrad von Feuchtwangen, leader of the Teutonic Knights. The third was the Hospitallers led by de Villiers and included the Order of St. Thomas of Acre. Finally, the fourth was led by Guillaume de Beaujeu and Thomas de Sainville. The troops of al-Ashraf Khalil regrouped under the walls of Acre on 5 April 1291 and began their attack on 12 April. The besieged tried several sorties without success, even the arrival of reinforcements sent by Henry II of Cyprus, who was present in the city, were without effect. During the assault of 16 May, a breach was opened near the Saint-Antoine gate, but the Templars and the Hospitallers, led by Marshal Matthieu de Clermont, succeeded in repelling the Mamluks. During this respite, women and children embarked, but their boats could not sail due to the state of the sea. On May 18, the enemy resumed its assaults, at the Porte Saint-Antoine, de Clermont succeeded in repelling them but he was caught in the back by other troops who had crossed the wall. De Beaujeu was wounded and died shortly afterwards, Jean de Villiers was also wounded but saved by the valets d'armes and escaped by sea with seven Hospitaller knights, the only survivors, Matthieu de Clermont died near the Rue des Génois. All others surrendered. The Mamluks were masters of the city, sending the women and children to slavery, and killing all the men.

== Interlude on Cyprus, 1291–1309 ==
The Hospitallers relocated to Kingdom of Cyprus following the fall of Acre. Taking refuge in Limassol at the Castle of Kolossi, Jean de Villiers held a General Chapter of the Order on 6 October 1292. He wanted to put the Hospitallers in a position to reconquer the Holy Land. He still enjoyed a persistent popularity by reforming the mode of election of the Grand Master. Postulants were still numerous, with recruitments were subject to the approval of the Grand Master. He prepared for the defense of Cyprus and the protection of Armenia, both of which were threatened by the Mamluks. Entangled in Cypriot politics, de Villaret formed a plan to acquire a new temporal domain, the island of Rhodes, then part of the Byzantine Empire.

The death of Jean de Villiers occurred in the weeks following the organization of a second General Chapter on 30 October 1293. He was succeeded by Odon de Pins. De Pins faced an internal crisis in the Order which was led by Guillaume de Villaret, then Prior of Saint-Gilles. The dignitaries addressed pope Boniface VIII on 12 August 1295 in order to obtain a reform of the governance of the Order. As de Pins did not take into account Boniface's admonitions, he was summoned him to appear before the pontifical court. He was about to set out, but he died on 17 March 1296 in Limassol, and was succeeded as Grand Master by his challenger Guillaume de Villaret. One of the first tasks to which de Villaret devoted himself was to reduce the power acquired by the General Chapter. In 1301, it was under his magistracy that an administrative division based on the notion of the Hospitaller Langue, because it respected linguistic zones that are more or less homogeneous.

After the loss of Acre, the balance of power in the Holy Land between Christians and Mamluks was clearly in favor of the latter, who continued to advance. However, the Christians could count on the Mongols of Persia led by Mahmud Ghazan Khan, whose expansionism pushed them to covet the Mamluk lands. His army took Aleppo, and was there joined by his vassal Hethum II of Armenia, whose forces included some Templars and Hospitallers, all of whom participated in the rest of the offensive. The Mongols and their allies defeated the Mamluks in the Third Battle of Homs in December 1299. The khan sent an ambassador to Nicosia to establish an alliance. Henry II of Cyprus, Hethum II and Templar Grand Master Jacques de Molay decided to have him escorted to the pope to support the idea of an alliance, which became effective in 1300.

While waiting for the results of this diplomatic initiative, Henry II, Guillaume de Villaret and Jacques de Molay raised a fleet for a raid on Egypt. The Christians, aboard sixteen galleys and a dozen small ships, were accompanied by a Mongol emissary. In July 1300, they pillaged Rosetta and Alexandria before returning to Cyprus. The booty was considerable and the Christians sent a strong sign to Mahmud Ghazan, demonstrating their determination to engage in the planned battle. The Mongol leader then sent them a message to warn them that he intended to launch his campaign soon and invited them to disembark in Armenia to organize a joint offensive.

The king of Cyprus sent an army to Armenia accompanied by 300 knights of the two Orders led personally by the Grand Masters. They stormed the island of Ruad, near the Syrian coast, with the aim of turning it into a base for their future operations. They then took the port city of Tortosa, pillaged the region, captured many Muslims and sold them as slaves in Armenia while waiting for the arrival of the Mongols, but this only led to the Fall of Ruad, the last battle for the Holy Land.

== Hospitaller Rhodes ==
When the Hospitallers retreated to Cyprus, the island was ruled by the titular king of Jerusalem, Henry II of Cyprus. He was less than pleased that an organization as powerful as the Order could compete with him for the sovereignty of his small island and likely set Guillaume de Villaret on the path to conquer the island of Rhodes. De Villaret died between 23 November 1304 and 3 November 1305, and this objective was achieved under Guillaume's successor Foulques de Villaret who led the Hospitaller conquest of Rhodes beginning in 1306.

In 1308, Clement V began preaching of a new Crusade, to be launched against the Mamluks in the Holy Land in the spring of 1309. The Crusade was planned to be a small, preliminary expedition led by the Hospitallers. An unwelcomed byproduct of this preaching was Crusade of the Poor, appearing before Avignon in July 1309. Clement granted the poor crusaders an indulgence, but refused to let them participate in the professional expedition led by the Hospitallers. That expedition set off in early 1310, but instead of sailing for the Holy Land, the Hospitallers went to Rhodes.

About the same time, the trials of the Knights Templar began. Huge benefits to the Order resulted from these trials, as the Templars' assets were assigned to the Hospitallers by Clement V in 1312. The campaigns of territorial expansion ran the Order heavily into debt, and these debts were not paid off until the mid-1330s. Guillaume de Villaret was the last to lead Knights Hospitaller, and Foulques de Villaret the first to lead the Knights of Cyprus and Rhodes, presiding over what is known as Hospitaller Rhodes which would last from 1310 until 1522.

== Historiography ==
The first writings of the Hospitallers were in the works of the original Latin chroniclers of the First Crusade. The most complete account is in Historia Rerum in Partibus Transmarinis Gestarum (History of Deeds Done Beyond the Sea) by William of Tyre, which mixed fact with fiction. The first complete history of the Order was written by Hospitaller Commander Guigliemo (William) of Santo Stefano after the fall of Acre in 1291. It was structured around the Grand Masters and relied on original sources, which were carefully cited. Guigliemo swept aside numerous legends about the hospital's foundation, including some that pushed it as far back as the second century before Christ, as fabrications designed to encourage donations. He cautioned his readers, Ores leissons la vanité, et tenons la verité (Now let us let go of vanity, and hold to the truth). While on Cyprus, Guigliemo also wrote a treatise on the Order's statutes. His original works were intended to replace some of what was lost in the fall of Acre. Translations were done by John of Antioch.

A number of letters from the Hospitallers in the Holy Land have survived. These include the following.

- Grand Master Gilbert of Assailly to Louis VII of France, c. 1167, on the Crusader invasion of Egypt.
- Brother of the Hospital Raymond to the Christian faithful, 1178.
- Grand Master Armengarde of Aspe to Leopold V, Duke of Austria, in November 1188, on the ravages of Saladinto the kingdom.
- Various letters from Grand Masters Geoffroy de Donjon (1201), Nicolas Lorgne (1282), and Jean de Villiers (1289 and 1291) to brothers of the Hospital on the status of the kingdom.
- Letter from Guillaume de Chateauneuf to Lord M. Melaye on the loss of Jerusalem, 1244.

Templar of Tyre was an anonymous fourteenth-century historian who compiled the Old French chronicle called Gestes des Chiprois (Deeds of the Cypriots). The Gestes was written between about 1315 and 1320 on Cyprus and presents a history of the Crusader states and the Kingdom of Cyprus from 1132 down to 1309 as well as an account of the trials of the Templars in 1314. The work also provides an account of the Siege of Acre in 1291 and deeds of Hospitaller Matthieu de Clermont.

After the fall of Acre, the Hospitallers were closely involved in the planning for a new Crusade with Clement V. In 1882, Paul Riant published a Hospitaller document in the collection Itinéraires à Jérusalem et descriptions de la Terre Sainte, rédigés en Français aux xie, xiie & xiiie siècles, edited by Henri-Victor Michelant and Gaston Raynaud. This document, La Devise des Chemins de Babiloine, detailed the strengths of Mamluk armies in Egypt and Syria and gave mileages of the various routes between Cairo and the Delta ports, dated between 1289 and 1291.

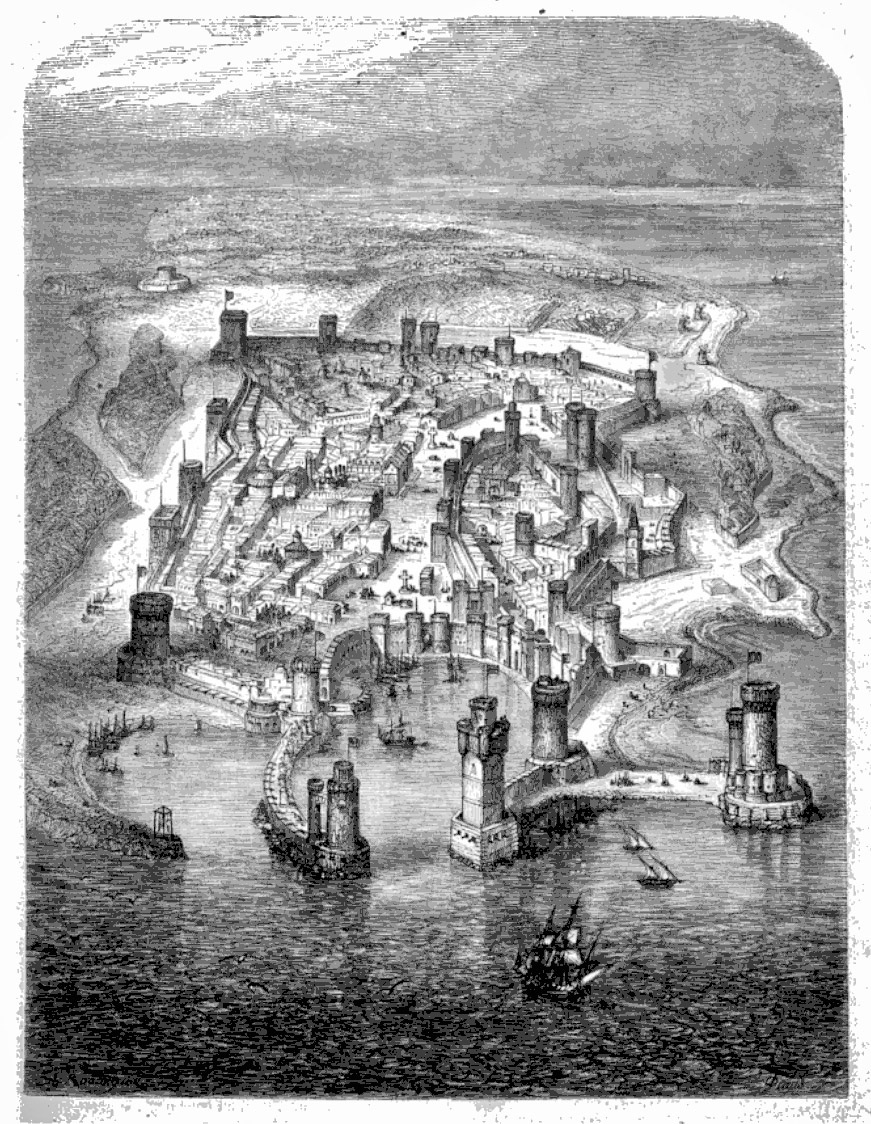
Siege de Rhodes 1480, d'Après Guillaume Caoursin. By Émile and Adolphe Rouargue, 1856.

Guillaume Caoursin was the fifteenth century historian of the Knights Hospitaller after 1460, writing Primordium et origo sacri Xenodochii atque Ordinis militiae Sancti Joannis Baptistae Hospitalariorum Hierosolimitani (Foundation and management of the hospital of Saint John in Jerusalem), a rewriting of the statutes of the Order. He also wrote Rhodiorum historia, a collection of histories of the Hospitallers, and Stabilimenta Rhodiorum militum, a compilation of the Order's rules. His Obsidionis Rhodiae urbis descripto, an account of the Siege of Rhodes of 1480, was translated and included in Edward Gibbon's The Crusades. The works are part of the collection at the National Library of Malta.

Pierre d'Aubusson was the fortieth Grand Master, serving from 1476 to 1503. He was commander of the garrison opposing the Turks during the Siege of Rhodes in 1480. He wrote his Account of the Siege of Rhodes, which is included in the history by John Taaffe. The Histoire de Pierre d'Aubusson (1667) by French Jesuit Dominique Bouhours is the biography of d'Aubusson, containing accounts of the siege in 1480 and the later Siege of Rhodes in 1522 led by Suleiman the Magnificent.

Giacomo Bosio was a brother and historian of the Order, born in the sixteenth century. Bosio's work dealt with the history of the Hospitallers from its origin until 1571, and was written with Jean Parisot de la Valette, the forty-ninth Grand Master. The work was continued by brother Bartolomeo dal Pozzo up to the year 1688 and first published in Verona in 1703 in two volumes, then in Venice in 1740 under the title Historia della Sacra di religione militare S. Giovanni Gerosolimitano, della Malta. Bosio's history was translated into French by Pierre de Boissat, augmented by Jean Baudoin. The Hospitaller brother Anne de Naberat completed the life of the great masters, published in two volumes folio in Paris in 1643 and also in 1659, with portraits of the great masters.

The first modern attempt to collect the numerous charters, deeds and records was in 1737 by Sebastiano Pauli in his Codice diplomatico del sacro militare ordine Gerosolimitano. This was extended and improved in the Cartulaire général de l'Ordre des Hospitaliers, by French historian Joseph Delaville Le Roulx. Many of these were translated into English by Sir Edwin James King, librarian of the British Order of St. John of Jerusalem. Documents specifically related to Blessed Gerard were published by Antoine Du Bourg in his Histoire du Grand Prieuré de Toulouse in 1883.

A number of nineteenth century English writers produced works on the Hospitallers. Historian John Taaffe was a Knight Commander of the Sovereign Order of St. John of Jerusalem and chronicler of various military orders. In 1852, he published a historical account of the Order in four volumes entitled The History of the Holy, Military, Sovereign Order of St. John of Jerusalem: or, Knights Hospitallers, Knights Templars, Knights of Rhodes, Knights of Malta. This Includes the account of commander Pierre d'Aubusson.

Lambert B. Larking was an English clergyman, writer and antiquarian who was a founding member of the Kent Archaeological Society. Larking translated a work called The Knights Hospitallers in England, which was the report of prior Philip de Thame to the Grand Master Hélion de Villeneuve for the year 1338. The historical introduction was written by philogist John M. Kemble.

William K. R. Bedford was an English clergyman and author, with works reflecting his interest as an antiquary and genealogist. From 1878 to 1902, he was chaplain of the Order of St. John of Jerusalem, serving as their official genealogist. His works dealing with the history and regulations of the Knights Hospitallers, include Malta and the Knights (1870), Notes on the Old Hospitals of the Order of St. John of Jerusalem (1881), and a history of the English Hospitallers (1902) in collaboration with Richard Holbeche.

Among the sources of the Crusades compiled in the late nineteenth century include many on the Knights Hospitaller. Exordium Hospitalariorum is collection of accounts of the Hospitaller in six parts presented in Recueil des historiens des croisades (RHC) Historiens occidentaux, Volume 5. IX (1895). The works include:

- De prima institutione Hospitalariorum is a short, anonymous account of the Knights Hospitaller. The work is derivative of William of Tyre's account, and discusses the conflicts between the order and the religious authorities.
- Tractus de exordio sacrae domus Hospitalis Jerosolimitani is a history of the Knights Hospitaller written by an unknown author known only as Joseph the Historiographer.
- Comment le sainte maison de l'Hospital de S. Johan de Jerusalem commença on the founding of the Order. The work by Guillaume de Saint-Estève (Guigliemo of Santo Stefano), a thirteenth century scholar and Hospitaller disputed the account presented in the Miracula.
- De Primordiis et Inventione Sacræ Religionis Jerosolymorum (On the Origin and Discovery of Religion in Jerusalem) is an anonymous history of the Hospitallers from the time of Raymond du Puy until their establishment at Rhodes in 1310. It continues the repudiation of the Miracula and appears to be closely related to the works of Guillaume Caoursin.
- Primordium et origo sacri Xenodochii atque Ordinis militiae Sancti Joannis Baptistae Hospitalariorum Hierosolimitani (Foundation and management of the hospital of Saint John in Jerusalem) is a rewriting of the statutes of the Order, written by Caoursin in 1489. Directed by Grand Master Pierre d'Aubusson, the work converted the statutes from a chronology to one organized by subject matter. Caoursin revived the legend of the Miracula.
- Le fondement du S. Hospital de l'ordre de la chevalerie de S. Jehan Baptiste de Jerusalem is an old French version of Primordium et origo sacri Xenodochii, originally written in Latin. In 1493, it was translated into the various vulgar languages in use among the Christian peoples.

In addition to Cartulaire général de l'Ordre des Hospitaliers noted above, Joseph Delaville Le Roulx also wrote his seminal work Les Hospitaliers en Terre Sainte et à Chypre (1100–1310) in 1904. This work is concerned only with the stay of the Hospitallers in the Holy Land from 1100 to 1310 organized by Grand Master and includes discussions of the constitution, administrative organization and territorial expansion of the Order. Delaville Le Roulx' Inventaire des pièces de Terre-Sainte de l'ordre de l'Hôpital was published in Revue de l'Orient Latin in 1895. This inventory of the charters of Syria, is due to one of the archivists of the great priory of Saint-Gilles, Jean Raybaud and is preserved in the departmental archives of Bouches-du-Rhône, in Marseilles.

Modern historians of the subject most notably include Jonathan Riley-Smith, Helen Nicholson and Alain Demurger. Significant contributions from Crusader castles are also provided by archaeologists to include David Nicolle and Hugh Kennedy.

== List of grand masters ==
The list of grand masters of the Knights Hospitaller, including those who served ad Interim, with approximate dates is as follows. Note that there is considerable disagreement on the dates of tenure. In his 1904 work, Delaville Le Roulx also compiled a list of all known senior officers of the Hospitaller.

Grand masters of the Knights Hospitaller
Name	Tenure
Blessed Gerard	1113–1120
Raymond du Puy	1120–1160
Auger de Balben	1160–1162
Arnaud de Comps	1162
Gilbert of Assailly	1162–1170
Gastone de Murols	1170–1172
Jobert of Syria	1172–1177
Roger de Moulins	1177–1187
William Borrel, ad Interim	1187
Armengol de Aspa	1187–1190
Garnier de Nablus	1190–1192
Geoffroy de Donjon	1193–1202
Pierre de Mirmande, ad Interim	1202
Fernando Afonso de Portugal	1202–1206
Geoffroy le Rat	1206–1207
Guérin de Montaigu	1207–1228
Bertrand de Thessy	1228–1231
Guérin Lebrun	1231–1236
Bertrand de Comps	1236–1240
Pierre de Vieille-Brioude	1240–1242
Guillaume de Chateauneuf (imprisoned 1244–1250)	1242–1258
Jean de Ronay, ad Interim	1244–1250
Hugues de Revel	1258–1277
Nicolas Lorgne	1277–1285
Jacques de Taxi, ad Interim	1285
Jean de Villiers	1285–1294
Odon de Pins	1294–1296
Guillaume de Villaret	1296–1305
Foulques de Villaret	1305–1317

== See also ==
- Grand Masters of the Knights Hospitaller
- Cartulaire général de l'Ordre des Hospitaliers
- History of the Knights Templar
- Grand Masters of the Knights Templar
- List of Knights Hospitaller sites
- Commanderies of the Order of Saint John
- Priors of St. John of Jerusalem in England
- Langue (Knights Hospitaller)
- Bailiff (Order)
- Flags of the Knights Hospitaller
- Hospitaller Rhodes

== Bibliography ==
- Asbridge, Thomas (2012). The Crusades: The War for the Holy Land. Simon & Schuster. ISBN 978-1-84983-688-3.
- Barber, Malcolm (1994). The Military Orders: Fighting for the faith and caring for the sick. Variorum. ISBN 978-0-86078-438-8.
- Barber, Malcolm; Bate, Keith (2013). Letters from the East: Crusaders, Pilgrims and Settlers in the 12th–13th Centuries. Ashgate Publishing, Ltd., Crusader Texts in Translation. ISBN 978-1-4724-1393-2.
- Barker, Ernest (1923). The Crusades. World's manuals. London: Oxford University Press.
- Beltjens, Alain (1995). Aux origines de l'ordre de Malte: de la fondation de l'Hôpital de Jérusalem à sa transformation en ordre militaire. A. Beltjens. ISBN 978-2-9600092-0-0.
- Bosio, Giacomo (1659). Histoire des chevaliers de l'ordre de S. Jean de Hierusalem. Thomas Joly.
- Brownstein, Judith (2005). The Hospitallers and the Holy Land: Financing the Latin East, 1187-1274. Boydell Press. ISBN 978-1-84383-131-0.
- Cartwright, Mark (2018). Knights Hospitaller. World History Encyclopedia.
- Chassaing, Augustin (1888). Cartulaire des hospitaliers (Ordre de saint-Jean de Jérusalem) du Velay. Paris: Alphonse Picard.
- Critien, John E. (2005). Chronology of the Grand Masters of the Order of Malta. Midsea Books, Limited. ISBN 978-99932-7-067-6.
- Delaville Le Roulx, Joseph (1894). Cartulaire général de l'Ordre des hospitaliers de S. Jean de Jérusalem (1100-1310). E. Leroux, Paris.
- Delaville Le Roulx, Joseph (1895). Inventaire des pièces de Terre-Sainte de l'ordre de l'Hôpital. Revue de l'Orient Latin, Tome III. pp. 12 v.
- Delaville Le Roulx, Joseph (1904). Les Hospitaliers en Terre Sainte et à Chypre (1100-1310). Paris: E. Leroux.
- Demurger, Alain (2009). The Last Templar: The Tragedy of Jacques de Molay. Profile Books. ISBN 978-1-84668-224-7.
- Demurger, Alain (2013). Les Hospitaliers, De Jérusalem à Rhodes 1050-1317. Paris: Tallandier. ISBN 979-10-210-0060-5.
- Du Bourg, Antoine (1883). Histoire du Grand Prieuré de Toulouse. Toulouse: Sistac et Boubée.
- Dunbabin, Jean (1998). Charles I of Anjou. Power, Kingship and State-Making in Thirteenth-Century Europe. Bloomsbury. ISBN 978-1-78093-767-0.
- Flavigny, Bertrand G. (2005). Histoire de l'ordre de Malte. Paris: Perrin. ISBN 978-2-262-02115-3.
- France, John (1998). The Crusades and their Sources: Essays Presented to Bernard Hamilton. Ashgate Publishing. ISBN 978-0-86078-624-5.
- Gibbon, Edward (1870). The Crusades. Verbatim reprints. A. Murray and Son, London.
- Harot, Eugène (1911). Essai d'armorial des grands maîtres de l'Ordre de Saint-Jean de Jérusalem. Collegio araldico.
- Hitti, Philip K. (1937). History of the Arabs. Macmillan, New York.
- Howorth, Henry H. (1867). History of the Mongols, from the 9th to the 19th century. Pt. 3-4 reprinted New York, B. Franklin, as its Research and source work series; no. 85. Longmans, Green, and Co., London.
- Josserand, Philippe (2009). Prier et combattre, Dictionnaire européen des ordres militaires au Moyen Âge. Fayard, Paris. ISBN 978-2-213-62720-5.
- King, Edwin J. (2018) [1931]. The Knights Hospitallers in the Holy Land. Forgotten Books (originally published by Methuen & Company Limited). ISBN 978-0-331-89269-7.
- King, Edwin J. (1934). The Rules, Statutes and Customs of the Knights Hospitaller, 1099–1310. Methuen & Company Limited.
- Lewis, Kevin J. (2017). The Counts of Tripoli and Lebanon in the Twelfth Century: Sons of Saint-Gilles. Routledge. ISBN 978-1-4724-5890-2.
- Lock, Peter (2006). The Routledge Companion to the Crusades. Routledge. doi:10.4324/9780203389638. ISBN 0-415-39312-4.
- Luttrell, Anthony T. (1998). The Hospitallers' Early Written Records. Ashgate.
- Luttrell, Anthony T. (2021). "Confusion in the Hospital's pre-1291 Statutes". The Crusades and their Sources: Essays Presented to Bernard Hamilton. In Crusades, Routledge. pp. 109–114. doi:10.4324/9781003118596-5. ISBN 978-1-003-11859-6. S2CID 233615658.
- Mikaberidze, Alexander (2011). Conflict and Conquest in the Islamic World: A Historical Encyclopedia. ABC-CLIO. ISBN 978-1-59884-336-1.
- Moeller, Charles (1910). "Hospitallers of St. John of Jerusalem" . Catholic Encyclopedia. Vol. 7.
- Moeller, Charles (1912). "Knights Templars" . Catholic Encyclopedia. Vol. 14.
- Munro, Dana Carleton (1902). Letters of the Crusaders. Translations and reprints from the original sources of European history. University of Pennsylvania.
- Murray, Alan V. (2006). The Crusades—An Encyclopedia. ABC-CLIO. ISBN 978-1-57607-862-4.
- Nicholson, Helen J. (1993). Templars, Hospitallers, and Teutonic Knights: Images of the Military Orders, 1128-1291. Leicester University Press. ISBN 978-0-7185-1411-2.
- Nicholson, Helen J. (2001). The Knights Hospitaller. Boydell & Brewer. ISBN 978-1-84383-038-2.
- Nicholson, Helen J.; Nicolle, David (2005). God's Warriors: Crusaders, Saracens and the Battle for Jerusalem. Bloomsbury. ISBN 978-1-84176-943-1.
- Nicolle, David (2001). Knight Hospitaller, 1100–1306. Illustrated by Christa Hook. Osprey Publishing. ISBN 978-1-84176-214-2.
- Pauli, Sebastiano (1737). Codice diplomatico del sacro militare ordine Gerosolimitano. Salvatore e Giandomenico Marescandoli.
- Phillips, Walter Alison (1911). "St John of Jerusalem, Knights of the Order of the Hospital of" . Encyclopædia Britannica. Vol. 24 (11th ed.). pp. 12–19.
- Phillips, Walter Alison (1911). "Templars" . Encyclopædia Britannica. Vol. 26 (11th ed.). pp. 591–600.
- Prawer, Joshua (1972). The Crusaders' Kingdom: European Colonialism in the Middle Ages. Praeger. ISBN 978-1-84212-224-2.
- Riley-Smith, Jonathan (1967). The Knights of St. John in Jerusalem and Cyprus, c. 1050-1310. Macmillan. ISBN 978-1-4039-0615-1.
- Riley-Smith, Jonathan (1973). The Feudal Nobility and the Kingdom of Jerusalem, 1174-1277. Macmillan. ISBN 978-0-333-06379-8.
- Riley-Smith, Jonathan (1999). Hospitallers: The History of the Order of St. John. Hambledon Press. ISBN 978-1-85285-196-5.
- Riley-Smith, Jonathan (2012). The Knights Hospitaller in the Levant, c. 1070-1309. Palgrave Macmillan. ISBN 978-0-230-29083-9.
- Rossignol, Gilles (1991). Pierre d'Aubusson: Le Bouclier de la Chrétienté. Editions La Manufacture. ISBN 978-2-7377-0284-6.
- Runciman, Steven (1951). A History of the Crusades, Volume One: The First Crusade and the Foundation of the Kingdom of Jerusalem. Cambridge University Press. ISBN 978-0-521-34770-9.
- Runciman, Steven (1952). A History of the Crusades, Volume Two: The Kingdom of Jerusalem and the Frankish East, 1100-1187. Cambridge University Press. ISBN 978-0-521-34771-6.
- Runciman, Steven (1954). A History of the Crusades, Volume Three: The Kingdom of Acre and the Later Crusades. Cambridge University Press. ISBN 978-0-521-34772-3.
- Schein, Sylvia (1991). Fideles Crucis: The Papacy, the West, and the Recovery of the Holy Land, 1274-1314. Clarendon Press. ISBN 978-0-19-822165-4.
- Setton, Kenneth M. (1969). A History of the Crusades. Six Volumes. University of Wisconsin Press.
- Setton, Kenneth M. (1976). The Papacy and the Levant, 1204-1571: The thirteenth and fourteenth centuries. American Philosophical Society. ISBN 978-0-87169-114-9.
- Sinclair, K. V. (1984). The Hospitallers' Riwle: Miracula et regula hospitalis sancti Johannis Jerosolimitani. Anglo-Norman Texts #42. ISBN 978-0-905474-12-0.
- Slack, Corliss K. (2013). Historical Dictionary of the Crusades. Scarecrow Press. ISBN 978-0-8108-7830-3.
- Stern, Eliezer (2006). "La commanderie de l'Ordre des Hospitaliers à Acre". Bulletin Monumental. 164. Bulletin Monumental Année 164-1, pp. 53-60: 53–60. doi:10.3406/bulmo.2006.1318.
- Treadgold, Warren T. (1997). A History of the Byzantine State and Society. Stanford University Press. ISBN 978-0-8047-2630-6.
- Tyerman, Christopher (2006). God's War: A New History of the Crusades. Belknap Press. ISBN 978-0-674-02387-1.
- Vann, Theresa M. (2006). "Order of the Hospital". The Crusades: An Encyclopedia. ABC-Clio. pp. 598–605.
- Vincent, Nicholas (2001). The Holy Blood: King Henry III and the Westminster Blood Relic. Cambridge University Press. ISBN 978-0-521-02660-4.

=== Archaeological Studies ===
- Boas, Adrian J. (2009). Jerusalem in the Time of the Crusades: Society, Landscape and Art in the Holy City Under Frankish Rule. Routledge. ISBN 978-0-415-23000-1.
- Nicolle, David (2005). Crusader Castles in the Holy Land 1192–1302. Bloomsbury. ISBN 978-1-84176-827-4.
- Kennedy, Hugh N. (1994). Crusader Castles. Cambridge University Press. ISBN 978-0-521-79913-3.
- Lawrence, T. E. (1988). Denys Pringle (ed.). Crusader Castles. Clarendon Press. ISBN 978-0-19-822964-3.
- Pringle, Denys (1997). Secular Buildings in the Crusader Kingdom of Jerusalem: An Archaeological Gazetteer. Cambridge University Press. ISBN 978-0-521-46010-1.
- Pringle, Denys (2007). The Churches of the Crusader Kingdom of Jerusalem: Volume 3, The City of Jerusalem: A Corpus. Cambridge University Press. ISBN 978-0-521-17283-7.
- Sharon, Moshe (1997). Corpus Inscriptionum Arabicarum Palaestinae (CIAP). Brill. ISBN 978-90-04-10833-2.
- Sinibaldi, Micaela (2014). Settlement in Crusader Transjordan (1100–1189): a Historical and Archaeological Study (PDF). Cardiff University (Ph.D. thesis in Archaeology).
- Sinibaldi, Micaela (2016). Micaela Sinibaldi; Kevin J. Lewis; Balázs Major; Jennifer A. Thompson (eds.). Crusader Landscapes in the Medieval Levant: The Archaeology and History of the Latin East. University of Wales Press. ISBN 978-1-78316-924-5.
