= Bailiff (order) =

Official in the Knights Hospitaller

A bailiff (French: bailli, French pronunciation: [baji]) was a high official in the Knights Hospitaller who directed one of its bailiwicks abroad or one of the national associations ("tongues") at its headquarters.

== History ==
Bailiff was the rank and title of the head of each of the bailiwicks of the Knights Hospitaller and also of the head, at Rhodes and Malta, of one of the seven, later eight, Langues (or tongues) into which the members of the Knights Hospitaller were grouped once the Order was established on Rhodes and subsequently on Malta. The langues were Auvergne, Aragon (later split into Castile-Portugal and Aragon-Navarre), England, France, Germany, Italy, and Provence.

Despite the seeming link to language, this organization was not strictly aligned with linguistic boundaries, but tended to combine the Order's knights and possessions in several nations or states; the German tongue, for instance, included Scandinavia, Hungary, Poland and Bohemia. Each tongue covered at least one Grand Priory. The Grand Prior and the Chapter, which comprised representatives of all bailiwicks and commandries, administered the individual tongues—including the Order's possessions, its charitable activities (hospitals etc.), parishes incorporated into the Order, and the financial contributions for the defense of Rhodes and later Malta and for the maintenance of the Order's naval forces in the Mediterranean.

At the center, in Rhodes and subsequently Malta, each tongue had its own auberge (hostel) which served as its headquarters and where the members lodged and took their meals. Presiding over the auberge was the "pillar", who by virtue of his office was a Bailiff of the Order and, typically, therefore also a member of the Order's Chapter-General representing his tongue. The bailiffs ranked just below the Grand Priors and Priors. They commanded the knights of their tongue at the center, where each tongue was responsible for the maintenance and defense of a specific portion of the fortress defenses and had to man it with sufficient numbers of knights and soldiers.

== See also ==
- Bailiff
