= Coliath =

Ruins of a fortification of the crusaders in Lebanon

- قلعة قليعات (Arabic)
- Location within Lebanon
- 34.5819°N 36.0158°E
- Location: Lebanon
- Region: North Governorate

Coliath (Arabic: قلعة قليعات Qalaat al-Qlaiaat; French: Colée) are ruins of a fortification of the crusaders in Lebanon. It belonged to the Knights Hospitaller. This large plain castrum, built during the first phase of Frankish occupation, dominates a slight knoll only two kilometers from the shore and five kilometers north of Archas. Coliath or "La Colée" - a francization of the non-Arabic al-Qulai'a, "the little fortress", the fort, plural al-Qulai'at, the forts - was given by Count Pons of Tripoli to the Hospitaller order in 1127. Saladin's brother, al-Adil, seized it in 1207 and dismantled it. It was then reoccupied by the Franks, but it was the Mamluk sultan Baibars who, in the summer of 1266, completely ruined it as a prelude to the capture of Tripoli.

Its defensive role was mediocre, so it was generally used as a dwelling for a troop in the field in times of war, as a base for economic domination in times of peace, or more simply as a place of refuge against raiders. The plan of its construction is that of a castrum (enclosure castle) similar to that of several other sites fortified by military orders in the region. It is a square enclosure flanked by towers, housing on its reverse side large vaulted multifunctional halls. Comparative examples include the inner enclosure of the citadel of Belvoir overlooking the Jordan Valley, the first enclosure of the Krac des Chevaliers, and the more modest enclosures of Qalaat Yahmour and Umm Hosh.

== See also ==
- List of Crusader castles
