= Jobert of Syria =

12th-century Grand Master of the Knights Hospitaller

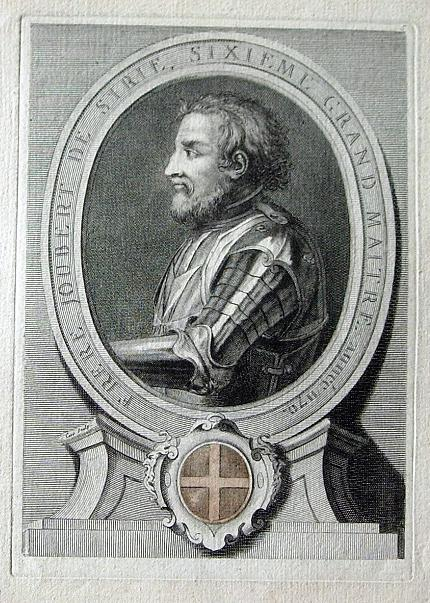
Jobert of Syria

Jobert of Syria (also known as Gilbert, Josberto, and Joubert) was the grand master of the Knights Hospitaller, in Syria from 1172 to his death, which is thought to have occurred in 1177. He was succeeded by Roger de Moulins.

== Career ==
There is no knowledge of the place or even the province where Jobert was born, nor do we know what his responsibilities in the Order were before his election. Jobert succeeded Gastone de Murols (1170–1172), while Gastone's predecessor Gilbert d'Aissailly had been deposed while still living. The memory of Gilbert must have informed Jobert of how not to waste the Order's funds, for he seems to have been a responsible steward of the order's assets.

In 1171, Amalric I of Jerusalem left the Holy Land to visit Constantinople and he entrusted Jobert with the guardianship of his son Baldwin IV of Jerusalem as well as the regency of the kingdom. In 1172, he successfully intervened to obtain the liberation of Raymond III of Tripoli, a prisoner of Nūr-ad-Din since his capture at the Battle of Harim in 1164. Raymond borrowed from the Hospitaller in order to pay his ransom, thought to be 80,000 pieces of gold.

In August 1174, he refused to commit, along with the other military orders, to aiding the Sicilian navy in attacking Egypt with Miles de Plancy, the regent of the Kingdom of Jerusalem. In December he joined the new regent Raymond III of Tripoli in a planned attack on Saladin. He and his forces were with the army that menaced Homs after Saladin had taken it. No battle was fought and the Franks left in exchange for the release of hostages and remission of ransoms.

Jobert instigated pope Alexander III to order the prelates not to demand the "dime des noviale" from the lands cultivated by the Hospitallers and from the fodder intended for the feeding of their livestock. In 1175, Jobert was at the origin of a decree, with the church of Acre, which established the "Rules of the Church of the Hospitallers of Jerusalem" concerning the procedures for the morning service of private and public masses, funeral rites, the sacraments, the pricing of confessions, the lighting of candles, and other things, in which he did not abandon any of the privileges he held from the Holy See. He was bursar of the Order's funds but never saved money to provide bread for the poor of the Hospital of the Order in Jerusalem. He issued a decree specifying that each loaf of bread should weigh two marcs and that each poor person should receive half a loaf. He allocated the revenues of Sainre-Marie and Caphaer to this use. In 1176, Jobert had Baldwin IV of Jerusalem, now king, confirm the donations that the Order had received. These agreements mention a regular development in Jerusalem, in the vicinity of Jaffa, in Tiberias, in the county of Tripoli and the principality of Antioch.

In 1176, Baldwin IV of Jerusalem confirmed a grant of lands in Egypt to the Order in exchange for assistance from Jobert in the planned campaign there. Though Jobert supported the Egyptian policy, he is last mentioned in January 1177, and his successor, Roger de Moulins, did not agree with the plan, which was abandoned. One of two surviving letters written by Jobert is one to the people of Savona.

Jobert's magisterium ended between January and October 1177, not, as is commonly believed, in Saladin's prisons following the battle of Jacob's Ford in August 1179. Roger de Moulins succeeded him in October 1177 at the latest.

== See also ==
- Cartulaire général de l'Ordre des Hospitaliers
- List of Knights Hospitaller sites
- Langue (Knights Hospitaller)
- Flags of the Knights Hospitaller

== Bibliography ==
- Bellomo, Elena (2016). Crusader Landscapes in the Medieval Levant. A Neglected Source for the History of the Hospital. ISBN 9781783169245.
- Delaville Le Roulx, Joseph (1904). Les Hospitaliers en Terre Sainte et à Chypre (1100-1310). E. Leroux, Paris.
- Demurger, Alain (2013). Les Hospitaliers, De Jérusalem à Rhodes 1050-1317. Tallandier, Paris. ISBN 979-1021000605.
- Harot, Eugène (1911). Essai d'armorial des grands maîtres de l'Ordre de Saint-Jean de Jérusalem. Collegio araldico.
- Josserand, Philippe (2009). Prier et combattre, Dictionnaire européen des ordres militaires au Moyen Âge. Fayard, Paris. ISBN 978-2213627205.
- Lewis, Kevin James (2017). The Counts of Tripoli and Lebanon in the Twelfth Century: Sons of Saint-Gilles. Routledge. ISBN 978-1-4724-5890-2.
- Lock, Peter (2006). The Routledge Companion to the Crusades. Routledge. doi:10.4324/9780203389638. ISBN 0-415-39312-4.
- Murray, Alan V. (2006). The Crusades—An Encyclopedia. ABC-CLIO. ISBN 978-1-57607-862-4.
- Nicholson, Helen J. (2001). The Knights Hospitaller. Boydell & Brewer. ISBN 978-1843830382.
- Runciman, Steven (1952). A History of the Crusades, Volume Two: The Kingdom of Jerusalem and the Frankish East, 1100-1187. Cambridge University Press. ISBN 9780521347716.
- Tyerman, Christopher (2006). God's War: A New History of the Crusades. Belknap Press. ISBN 978-0-674-02387-1.
- Vann, Theresa M. (2006). Order of the Hospital. The Crusades––An Encyclopedia, pp. 598–605.

Preceded by Gastone de Murols	Grand Master of the Knights Hospitaller; 1172–1177	Succeeded by Roger de Moulins
