= Siege of Belvoir Castle =

Ayyubids capture of Belvoir Castle

- Part of The Crusades
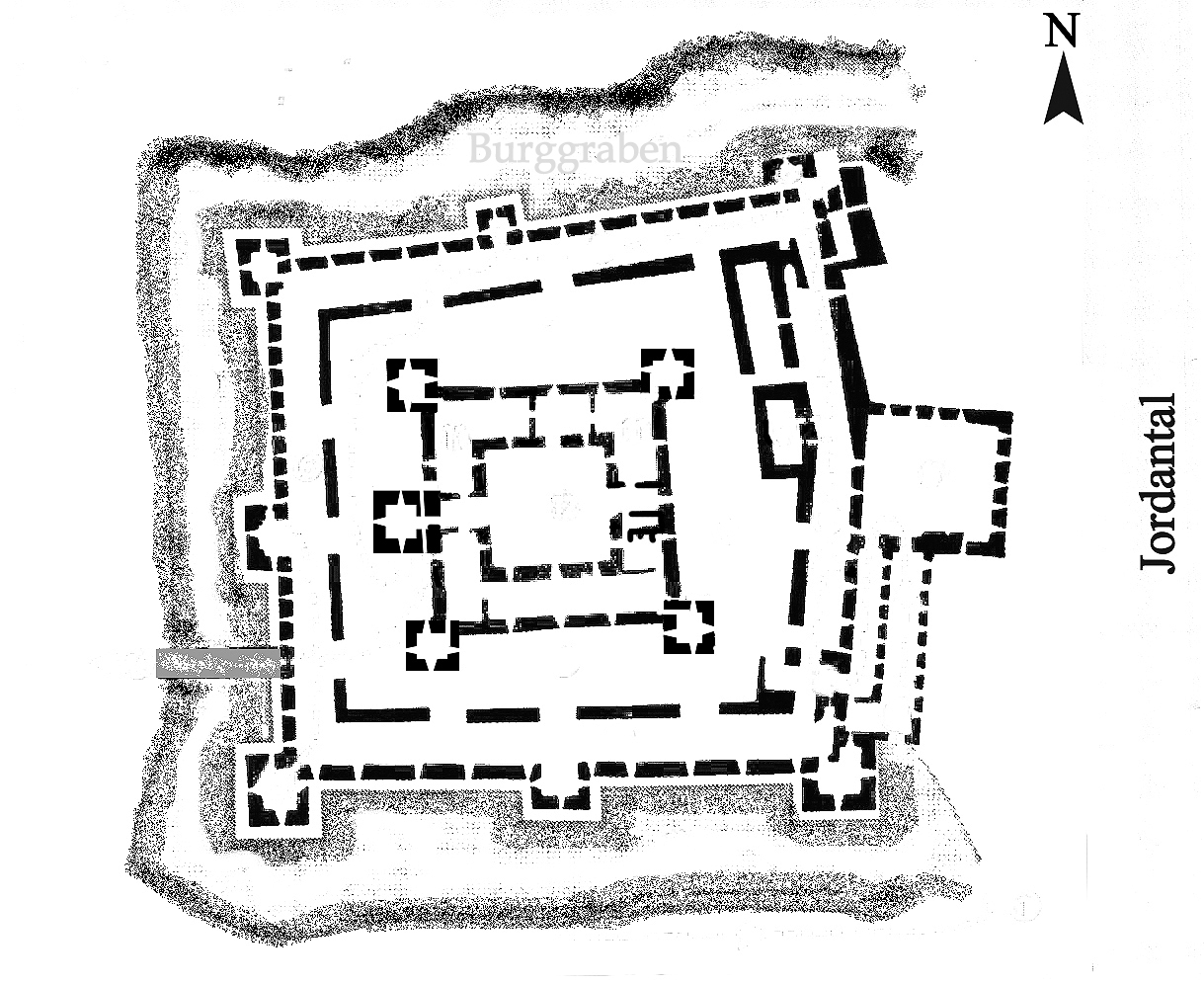
- Belvoir Castle drawing
Date	December 1187 – 9 January 1189
Location	Belvoir Castle
Result	Ayyubid victory

Belligerents
Ayyubid Sultanate	Knights Hospitaller

Commanders and leaders
Saladin; Saif al-Din Mahmud; Qaimaz	Armengol de Aspa (surrendered)

Strength
500 cavalry	Unknown

Casualties and losses
Unknown	Unknown

In late 1187, the Ayyubids, led by Saladin, besieged the Hospitallers fortress of Belvoir Castle for an entire year before the Ayyubid forces were successful.

== Background ==
Weakened and demoralized by the Battle of Hattin, the Knights Hospitaller seemed not to offer any resistance to the Ayyubids; their castle at Bethigibelin surrendered on the same terms as Jerusalem; however, they managed to recover. The grand masters of Hospitallers and Templars were in Tyre with Conrad of Montferrat, who had taken command of the Crusader forces by the end of July 1187. After their defeat at Hattin, surviving hospitallers determined to resist the Ayyubids fled to Belvoir Castle.

== Siege ==
The siege began in December 1187; the place was defended by well-supplied, tough survivors from earlier sieges. Saladin, who was preoccupied with the Siege of Tyre, sent his general, Saif al-Din Mahmud, to occupy a position near the castle, but the garrison intercepted two Muslim caravans, one laden with booty taken by Saladin. On a stormy night in January 1188, the Ayyubid guards were negligent; the hospitallers made a sortie at dawn, surprised the besiegers, and overran their camp, inflicting severe casualties on the Ayyubids.

The news of this defeat reached Saladin as he was retiring from the unsuccessful siege of Tyre. Furious by the sufferings endured by his general, Saladin then dispatched his general Qaimaz ahead to Belvoir with a force of 500 cavalry. Disbanding most of his army, he followed at the beginning of March, confident that the castle would be taken easily, but he realized he had a little force and a long siege would be required. Saladin withdrew in May, leaving his general, Qaimaz, with 500 cavalry; nevertheless, Qaimaz seemed more successful. A hospitaler's letter, written in November 1188, included news that nothing had been heard from Belvoir.

In the autumn, Saladin besieged the templar fortress of Safed, the crusaders in Tyre, fearing that if Safed had fallen, Belvoir would fall so easily, despatched a force of 200 men under two hospitaller officers; however, the ayyubids routed the force and the officers were captured. Safed had fallen on 6 December. Saladin then marched to Belvoir, where he dispatched a message to the garrison, promising them safety if they surrendered but threatening them with destruction if they kept resisting.

Saladin constructed a defensive wall to defend his men and tents, which were within the range of the castle, from the arrows of the castle. Since the nature of the land forced the Ayyubids to get closer to the walls, Saladin's army faced great difficulties, for it was rainy season and the Ayyubids crunched to the ground in thick mud. Heavy bombardment continued without cessation, accompanied by several assaults during which the Ayyubids suffered casualties, however, the Ayyubid archers shot so intensively that the defenders did not dare to look out of the main wall.

Finally, the Ayyubid sappers succeeded in breaking the outer wall tower. The Ayyubids assaulted the walls, which forced the hospitallers to retreat to the inner walls and ask for surrender. Saladin accepted their offer and allowed them to leave unharmed. The siege was finally over on 9 January.

== Bibliography ==
- J.Riley- Smith, Knights of St.John in Jerusalem and Cyprus, p. 109-111
- Ronnie Ellenblum, Crusader Castles and Modern Histories, p. 283-4
