= William Borrel =

Catholic military officer

William Borrel (died 4 July 1187) was acting Grand Master of the Knights Hospitaller, ad interim, from 1 May 1187 until his death at the Battle of Hattin in 1187. He became custodian of the Hospitallers after the Grand Master Roger de Moulins was killed in the Battle of Cresson on 1 May 1187.

== Biography ==
William (Guillaume) Borrel was the Grand Commander of the Knights Hospitaller, appointed to the position on 1 February 1186. He was at his post when his superior Roger de Moulins was killed at the Spring of Cresson near Nazareth by a lance wound to the chest on 1 May 1187. Borrel took over the direction of the Order as Grand Master ad interim, holding the highest responsibilities. He appointed Armengol de Aspa, later his successor as Grand Master, to his position as Grand Commander of the Order. He did not have time to be confirmed as Grand Master of the Order as he died on 4 July 1187 at the Horns of Hattin, where the next major battle of the conflict with Saladin occurred.

== The Battle of Hattin ==
On 2 July 1187, Saladin laid siege to Tiberias and seized the city. Tiberias' castle fell on July 5, and the Knights Hospitaller commanders advised Guy of Lusignan, then king of Jerusalem, not to provoke Saladin. On July 3, at a stormy council of war, the Franks agreed with Raymond III of Tripoli who had exposed the danger of attacking the enemy. But on the advice of Gerard de Ridefort, the Grand Master of the Knights Templar, the army set out to rescue the city of Tiberias. On 4 July, the force was surprised at the Battle of Hattin. From the beginning, the Templars, Hospitallers and Turcopoles placed in the vanguard could not withstand the shock of the attack. They asked Guy de Lusignan, for urgent help. But reinforcements were slow in coming and the defeat became a rout, with only 200 knights and 1000 men escaping. The rest were killed, including William Borrel. The king and his brother Amalric of Lusignan, Raynald de Châtillon, William V of Montferrat, Gerard de Ridefort, Humphrey IV of Toron, Hugh of Jabala, Plivain of Botron, Hugh of Gibelet, and other barons of the kingdom fell into the hands of the Ayyubids and on the next day, Saladin put to death all the Templars and Hospitallers in captivity except Gerard de Ridefort. The king and most of the other captured nobles were taken to Damascus, to be released for ransom.

The exception was Raynald de Châtillon. Saladin called Raynald to his tent, accusing him of many crimes including brigandage and blasphemy. (Rumors that Renaud had taken Saladin's sister prisoner while raiding a caravan were unfounded.) He offered him to choose between conversion to Islam or death. After Renaud flatly refused to convert, Saladin took a sword and struck Raynald with it. As Raynald fell to the ground, Saladin beheaded him.

== The Fall of Jerusalem ==
The victory of Hattin opened the road to Jerusalem to Saladin. Nazareth, Mount Tabor, and Acre fell on 10 July 1187, Caesarea, Jaffa, Nablus, Ramleh, Lydda, Ibelin on July 26, Artesia, Mirabel, Toron, and Gaza soon thereafter. Saladin arrived in Jerusalem on 17 September and began the Siege of Jerusalem three days later. The city was defended by a few knights and a small garrison of Templars and Hospitallers, all under the orders of Balian of Ibelin. The besieged capitulated on 2 October 1187 and the Christians were allowed to evacuate the city in exchange for a ransom. The evacuation took place in three groups, the first under the orders of the Templars, the second under those of the Hospitallers and the last under the orders of the Latin patriarch Heraclius of Jerusalem and Balian of Ibelin. They were escorted to the borders of the county of Tripoli. Ten friars of the Order of St. John of Jerusalem were allowed by Saladin to remain in Jerusalem to care for the wounded and sick.

== See also ==
- Cartulaire général de l'Ordre des Hospitaliers
- List of Knights Hospitaller sites
- Langue (Knights Hospitaller)
- Flags of the Knights Hospitaller

== Bibliography ==
- Delaville Le Roulx, Joseph (1904). Les Hospitaliers en Terre Sainte et à Chypre (1100-1310). E. Leroux, Paris.
- Demurger, Alain (2013). Les Hospitaliers, De Jérusalem à Rhodes 1050-1317. Tallandier, Paris. ISBN 979-1021000605.
- Harot, Eugène (1911). Essai d'armorial des grands maîtres de l'Ordre de Saint-Jean de Jérusalem. Collegio araldico.
- Josserand, Philippe (2009). Prier et combattre, Dictionnaire européen des ordres militaires au Moyen Âge. Fayard, Paris. ISBN 978-2213627205.
- Lewis, Kevin James (2017). The Counts of Tripoli and Lebanon in the Twelfth Century: Sons of Saint-Gilles. Routledge. ISBN 978-1-4724-5890-2.
- Lock, Peter (2006). The Routledge Companion to the Crusades. Routledge. doi:10.4324/9780203389638. ISBN 0-415-39312-4.
- Murray, Alan V. (2006). The Crusades—An Encyclopedia. ABC-CLIO. ISBN 978-1-57607-862-4. Archived from the original on 2023-03-26.
- Nicholson, Helen J. (2001). The Knights Hospitaller. Boydell & Brewer. ISBN 978-1843830382.
- Runciman, Steven (1952). A History of the Crusades, Volume Two: The Kingdom of Jerusalem and the Frankish East, 1100-1187. Cambridge University Press. ISBN 9780521347716.
- Setton, Kenneth M. (1969). A History of the Crusades. University of Wisconsin Press.
- Tyerman, Christopher (2006). God's War: A New History of the Crusades. Belknap Press. ISBN 978-0-674-02387-1.
- Vann, Theresa M. (2006). Order of the Hospital. The Crusades––An Encyclopedia, pp. 598–605.

| Preceded by Roger de Moulins | Grand Master of the Knights Hospitaller; 1187–1187 | Succeeded by Armengol de Aspa |
