= Auger de Balben =

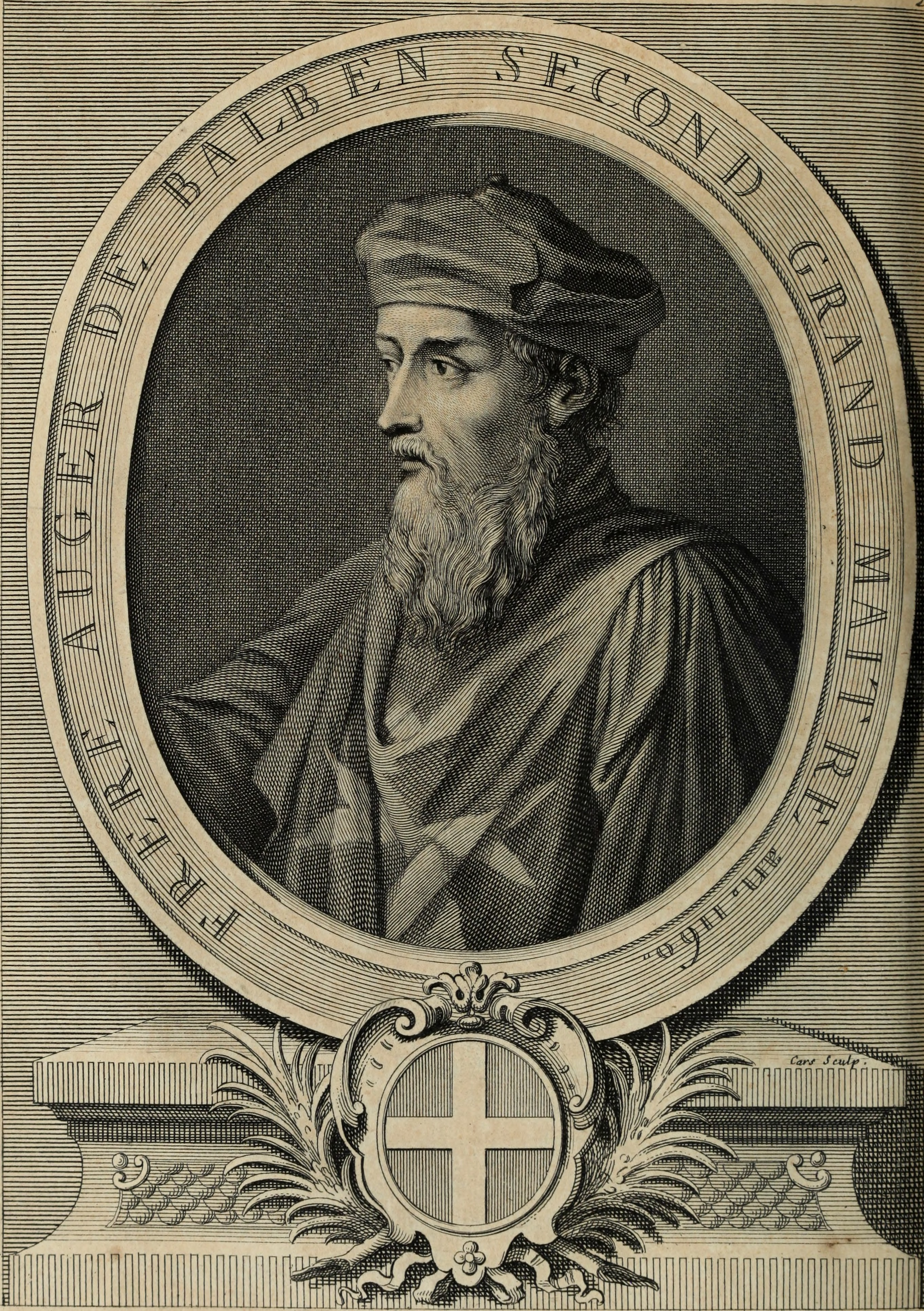
- Illustration of Auger de Balben, created c. 1726
- Title: Grand Master

Personal life
- Born: France
- Died: c.1163

Religious life
- Religion: Catholic
- Order: Knights Hospitaller

Senior posting
- Period in office: c. 1160 – c. 1163
- Predecessor: Raymond du Puy
- Successor: Gilbert of Assailly

Auger de Balben (died c. 1163) was the grand master of the Knights Hospitaller, holding the office from 1160 until his death. He succeeded Raymond du Puy. Many references list an Arnaud de Comps as Balben's successor, which some believe to be incorrect. His successor was Gilbert of Assailly.

== Biography ==
Auger de Balben was believed to be born in Dauphiné, at Risoul, despite the absence of any trace in the Dauphinois armorials. He was a former companion-in-arms of Raymond du Puy whom he accompanied in 1157 to Saint-Gilles in 1157 and to Forez in 1158.

In 1160, Auger would have taken part in the Synod of Nazareth and would have pronounced himself as supporting the pope Alexander III against the anti-pope Victor IV. The date of Auger's access to the magisterium is also uncertain. The first document that has come down to us and that probably comes from Auger of Balben dates from 29 November 1160, and the last known act of his predecessor is from 25 November 1158. His magistracy was short-lived, the last mention is of March 11, 1162. He was succeeded by Gilbert of Assailly.

== Arnaud de Comps ==
Some references list Arnaud de Comps as the successor to Auger and refer to him as the fourth grand master. He is today considered to have never existed, his name having appeared in the chronological lists placed at the head of the statutes, but his rank continues to be kept in the lists of grand masters.

== See also ==
- Cartulaire général de l'Ordre des Hospitaliers
- List of Knights Hospitaller sites
- Langue (Knights Hospitaller)
- Flags of the Knights Hospitaller

== Bibliography ==
- Barber, Malcolm (2012). The New Knighthood. A History of the Order of the Temple. Cambridge University Press. ISBN 978-1107604735.
- Chassaing, Augustin (1888). Cartulaire des hospitaliers (Ordre de saint-Jean de Jérusalem) du Velay. Alphonse Picard, Paris.
- Claverie, Pierre-Vincent (2005). L'ordre du Temple en Terre Sainte et à Chypre au XIIIe siècle. Nicosia: Centre de Recherche Scientifique. ISBN 9789963080946.
- Delaville Le Roulx, Joseph (1895). Inventaire des pièces de Terre-Sainte de l'ordre de l'Hôpital. Revue de l'Orient Latin, Tome III. pp. 12 v.
- Delaville Le Roulx, Joseph (1904). Les Hospitaliers en Terre Sainte et à Chypre (1100-1310). E. Leroux, Paris.
- Demurger, Alain (2013). Les Hospitaliers, De Jérusalem à Rhodes 1050-1317. Tallandier, Paris. ISBN 979-1021000605.
- Flavigny, Bertrand Galimard (2006). Histoire de l'ordre de Malte. Perrin, Paris. ISBN 978-2262021153.
- Harot, Eugène (1911). Essai d'armorial des grands maîtres de l'Ordre de Saint-Jean de Jérusalem. Collegio araldico.
- Josserand, Philippe (2009). Prier et combattre, Dictionnaire européen des ordres militaires au Moyen Âge. Fayard, Paris. ISBN 978-2213627205.
- Lock, Peter (2006). The Routledge Companion to the Crusades. Routledge. doi:10.4324/9780203389638. ISBN 0-415-39312-4.
- Murray, Alan V. (2006). The Crusades—An Encyclopedia. ABC-CLIO. ISBN 978-1-57607-862-4.
- Nicholson, Helen J. (2001). The Knights Hospitaller. Boydell & Brewer. ISBN 978-1843830382.
- Nicolle, David (2001). Knight Hospitaller, 1100–1306. Illustrated by Christa Hook. Osprey Publishing. ISBN 9781841762142.
- Pringle, Denys (2010). The Churches of the Crusader Kingdom of Jerusalem: Volume 3, The City of Jerusalem: A Corpus. Cambridge University Press. ISBN 978-0521172837.
- Riley-Smith, Jonathan (2012). The Knights Hospitaller in the Levant, c. 1070-1309. Palgrave Macmillan. ISBN 978-0-230-29083-9.
- Runciman, Steven (1952). A History of the Crusades, Volume Two: The Kingdom of Jerusalem and the Frankish East, 1100-1187. Cambridge University Press. ISBN 9780521347716.
- Vann, Theresa M. (2006). Order of the Hospital. The Crusades––An Encyclopedia, pp. 598–605.

Preceded by Raymond du Puy	Grand Master of the Knights Hospitaller; 1160–1163	Succeeded by Gilbert of Assailly
