= Gastone de Murols =

6th Grand Master of the Knights Hospitaller

Gastone de Murols (died 20 June 1172) was the grand master of the Knights Hospitaller from 1170 until his death in 1172. He succeeded Gilbert of Aissailly as Grand Master and was succeeded by Jobert of Syria.

== Biography ==
Gastone (Caste) de Murols was from a family having its origin in Murols and was therefore from Auvergne. He began as treasurer of the Order, a position he fulfilled following Géraud de Saint-André. He occupied the post beginning 1163 –1167, a position he held until his election as Grand Master.

He was appointed by Gilbert of Aissailly to succeed him in 1170. His election was recognized by only a part of the knights. The dissidents sided with the authority of a certain Rostang, a character known only by his seal, dividing the Order for the first time. This split was short-lived since the death of Gastone took place just two years later.

== See also ==
- Cartulaire général de l'Ordre des Hospitaliers
- List of Knights Hospitaller sites
- Langue (Knights Hospitaller)
- Flags of the Knights Hospitaller

== Bibliography ==
- Barber, Malcolm (2012). The New Knighthood. A History of the Order of the Temple. Cambridge University Press. ISBN 978-1107604735.
- Chassaing, Augustin (1888). Cartulaire des hospitaliers (Ordre de saint-Jean de Jérusalem) du Velay. Alphonse Picard, Paris.
- Claverie, Pierre-Vincent (2005). L'ordre du Temple en Terre Sainte et à Chypre au XIIIe siècle. Nicosia: Centre de Recherche Scientifique. ISBN 9789963080946.
- Delaville Le Roulx, Joseph (1895). Inventaire des pièces de Terre-Sainte de l'ordre de l'Hôpital. Revue de l'Orient Latin, Tome III. pp. 12 v.
- Delaville Le Roulx, Joseph (1904). Les Hospitaliers en Terre Sainte et à Chypre (1100-1310). E. Leroux, Paris.
- Demurger, Alain (2013). Les Hospitaliers, De Jérusalem à Rhodes 1050-1317. Tallandier, Paris. ISBN 979-1021000605.
- Flavigny, Bertrand Galimard (2006). Histoire de l'ordre de Malte. Perrin, Paris. ISBN 978-2262021153.
- Hardwicke, Mary Nickerson (1969). The Crusader States, 1192–1243 (PDF). A History of the Crusades (Setton), Volume II. Archived from the original (PDF) on 2024-03-28.
- Harot, Eugène (1911). Essai d'armorial des grands maîtres de l'Ordre de Saint-Jean de Jérusalem. Collegio araldico.
- Josserand, Philippe (2009). Prier et combattre, Dictionnaire européen des ordres militaires au Moyen Âge. Fayard, Paris. ISBN 978-2213627205.
- Murray, Alan V. (2006). The Crusades—An Encyclopedia. ABC-CLIO. ISBN 978-1-57607-862-4.
- Nicholson, Helen J. (2001). The Knights Hospitaller. Boydell & Brewer. ISBN 978-1843830382.
- Runciman, Steven (1954). A History of the Crusades, Volume Three: The Kingdom of Acre and the Later Crusades. Cambridge University Press. ISBN 978-0521347723.
- Setton, Kenneth M. (1969). A History of the Crusades. Six Volumes. University of Wisconsin Press.
- Vann, Theresa M. (2006). Order of the Hospital. The Crusades––An Encyclopedia, pp. 598–605.

Preceded by Gilbert of Assailly	Grand Master of the Knights Hospitaller; 1170–1172	Succeeded by Jobert of Syria
