= Raymond du Puy =

12th-century French knight and Grand Master of the Knights Hospitaller

Raymond du Puy (c. 1083–1160) was a knight from Dauphiné then in the Holy Roman Empire and the second master of the Knights Hospitaller, also known as the Order of St. John of Jerusalem, from around 1121 until 1160. Officially, he succeeded Blessed Gerard, the founder of the Order, as master. While traditionally cited as the direct successor upon Gerard's death in 1118 or 1120, his assumption of the magisterium was in 1121 or 1123 after one or two interim superiors, Pierre de Barcelona and Boyant Roger. Raymond divided the membership of the Order into clerical, military, and serving brothers and established the first significant Hospitaller infirmary near the Church of the Holy Sepulchre in Jerusalem.

== Transformation of the Hospitallers ==
Information on Hospitaller activity during Raymond's early years as grand master is limited and in those years, the Hospitaller were dedicated to a social mission. The first mention of their assuming a more militant role is related to the Crusader castle built at Bethgibelin, erected by King Fulk in 1135 as part of a string of fortifications to protect the kingdom. It commanded the road from Ascalon to Hebron, and in 1136, the king donated the castle to the Order for them to see to its operation and maintenance.

It was under Raymond that the Order took on a more military character. An act of 17 January 1126 gives us the name of a constable of the Hospitallers, a certain Durand, who seems to have military responsibilities. Nineteenth-century depictions also show Raymond in battle as early as 1130 (see Representations below). From 1137 onwards, the Order appeared in the wars that the troops of the kingdom of Jerusalem waged against the Muslims. Attacked from all sides, the kingdom of Jerusalem could hardly stand up to its enemies. Ascalon, because of its position on the seashore on the way to Egypt, was a permanent danger for the Christians, and the enemy made continuous incursions into the southern part of the kingdom. On the advice of Fulk, the Franks decided to fortify the position of Hisn Ibn Akkar, which belonged to the Hospitallers and was located east of Ascalon. The work, directed with speed by William of Malines, the Latin patriarch of Jerusalem, was naturally entrusted to the Hospitallers, who were placed in a vanguard position.

== Dealings with Spain ==
In 1140, Raymond went to Spain to settle the territorial grant that the Hospitallers had obtained from Alfonso the Battler, king of Aragon and Navarre. Alfonso, without an heir, had made the Hospitallers, the Knights Templar and the Knights of the Holy Sepulchre his legatees. When he died in the fall of 1134, the will was not respected. Charged with representing the three orders, Raymond came to Spain and began negotiations with Ramon Berenguer IV. The group relinquished their territorial rights, unless Berenguer died without issue. In exchange, they obtained the royal rights in Barbastro, Calatayud, Daroca, Huesca, Jaca, Zaragoza and all the towns that Aragon would later conquer, as well as in all the castles and towns of the kingdom with more than thirty peasants. The Hospitallers reserved the land necessary to build a church and a settlement in Jaca. On 24 June 1158, Pope Adrian IV confirmed this agreement at the request of Berenguer.

In April 1157, Raymond went to Portugal to renew the will of Alfonso. The presence of the Grand Master of the Order earned him, in addition to what he had already obtained 17 years earlier, enormous gifts from Ramon Berenguer IV and the bishop of Lérida. At the end of the year he was in Estopiñán del Castillo in Aragon and in the south of France where the abbot of Saint-Gilles, a certain Bertrand, gave permission to build a chapel. Pierre II de Posquières, the bishop of Lodève, gave him the churches of Saint-Julien and Saint-Vincent de Nébian. In July 1158, he met with Guichard of Pontigny, archbishop of Lyon and Guy II, count of Forez, to obtain, on 16 July 1158, an exemption from tolls by land and by water. On 25 October 1158, Raymond was near Verona where he obtained from Frederick Barbarossa a general confirmation of the exemption.

== In the Holy Land ==
In 1143, pope Celestine II issued a bull that gave the Hospitallers jurisdiction over the Santa Maria Alemanna (Church of Saint Mary of the Germans) in Jerusalem, a hospital that since 1128 accommodated German pilgrims and Crusaders who could neither speak the local language nor Latin. Although formally an institution of the Hospitallers, the pope commanded that the prior and the brothers of the domus Theutonicorum (house of the Germans) should always be Germans themselves, so a tradition of a German-led religious institution could develop during the 12th century in the Kingdom of Jerusalem. The latter, who gained their independence in 1190, remained under the responsibility of the Hospitallers until 1229.

Following the example of the Knights Templar, he was to develop protection for pilgrims by providing them with security in their travels to the Holy Places. Little by little, he hired knights and men-at-arms as mercenaries and participated, through intermediaries, in the defense of the Kingdom of Jerusalem. The political importance of the Grand Master increased, since in June 1148 at the Council of Acre, he was among the princes who took the decision to undertake the Siege of Damascus. In the Holy Land, the influence of the Hospitallers became preponderant with a decisive role taken in military operations with an increasingly prominent presence due to the government of Raymond. He is also said to have taken over the management of the leprosarium outside Jerusalem that eventually broke off from the Order to become the Order of Saint Lazarus, becoming its seventh Grand Master just before his death.

Amidst the Siege of Ascalon in 1153, a truce was held to enable each side to bury its dead. Baldwin III of Jerusalem held a council in his tent, with a relic of the True Cross present. After five months of siege, the position of the Franks did not improve. An Egyptian fleet had dispersed the Latin fleet, the Templars had suffered a serious defeat during the assault, and a good part of the knights had been massacred. The lay nobles, discouraged by the reverse, wished to abandon the siege; but Raymond and Fulk of Angoulême, the Latin patriarch of Jerusalem, persuaded the king to continue, a position that moved the barons. The attack was renewed more vigorously than before and, three days later, on 19 August 1153, the besieged capitulated and the following day they evacuated the city.

In 1156, Nūr-ad-Din and his brother Nasr-ad-Din routed a force of Hospitaller near their stronghold Qalaat el-Marqab close to Banyas. After a peace treaty was broken by Baldwin III in February 1157, the constable of Jerusalem, Humphrey II of Toron, to whom Banyas and the surrounding country belonged, had to face the Zengids. He quickly realized that his forces alone would not be enough and called upon the Hospitallers. He exchanged their participation for half of Banyas and the castles that depended on this city. His army, composed of a large foot force, was 700 strong, including the Hospitallers. But this did not prevent the defeat near Ras el Ma on April 24, which led to the conquest of Banyas on 10 May 1157, which Humphrey and the Hospitallers could not prevent. They were only able to defend the castle, which Baldwin III was able to supply in order to maintain its and leave a garrison there. On 19 June, the king was surprised on his way back through Jacob's Ford and routed. He managed to return to Safed and then to Acre. Humphrey later sold Banyas and the castle Chastel Neuf to the Hospitallers.

After the siege, a conflict broke out between Raymond and Fulk of Angoulême. The latter complained that the Hospitallers did not respect his ecclesiastical rights. He accused them of admitting excommunicated persons, administering the last rites and burying them in their cemeteries, ringing bells in "forbidden countries or times", receiving alms, providing for the Order's cures without diocesan approval and refusing to pay tithes on their goods and revenues. The patriarch pleaded for himself, but also for the whole patriarchate, whose prerogatives had been infringed. In addition to all this, there were personal considerations. The Order's hospital, installed opposite the Holy Sepulchre, competed with it by the beauty and height of its buildings, but also, when the patriarch preached, his voice was covered by the Hospitallers' bells. The Hospitallers had seen fit to respond by invading the Holy Sepulchre with an armed force. Fulk resolved to go before Adrian IV and ask for the withdrawal of the bull of pope Anastasius IV of 21 October 1154, which confirmed the prerogatives of the Order. Fulk, accompanied by the archbishops of Tyre and Caesarea, the bishops of Acre, Sidon, Lydda, Sebaste and Tiberias, left for Rome in the spring of 1155. After many travails, a new disappointment awaited them, as the pope had left Rome for Ferentino. When they finally saw the pope, he welcomed them coldly, although they did accompany him at the religious festivals. Their case was pleaded before the pope, finishing in endless debates. Fulk, understanding the uselessness of his attempt, returned to Jerusalem in autumn 1155.

== Administration of Crusader castles ==
Under his magisterium, the Order received numerous donations, notably from the county of Tripoli, to defend the Holy Land against the Muslims. It was under his mastery that the Hospitallers received its first concessions of castles: Bethgibelin in 1136, Qalaat el-Marqab, Chastel Neuf and, later, the Krak des Chevaliers in 1142/1144. The Order also obtained numerous privileges and exemptions from the papacy, providing it with the financial resources necessary for its independence and giving it freedom from the diocesan authorities, much to their displeasure.

Raymond du Puy gave the Hospitaller its first statutes, bearing his name. It is very likely that there was a rule, or what served as a rule, before him, but there is no such record. What is certain is that it predates 1153. Indeed, it was approved by pope Eugene III after 1145 and before 7 July 1153, the date of his death. It is possible to say that then, and only then, did the Hospitaller become an order.

Raymond also introduced the Order's Great Seal, or leaden bulla, that remained in use, with some modifications, from the 12th century until 1798. Until 1278, when Nicholas de Lorgne introduced a separate conventual bulla, there was no distinction between the seal of the Grand Master and that of the Order. The general design of the seal featured, on the obverse, the Grand Master kneeling in prayer before the patriarchal cross. This image was usually accompanied with the sacred letters alpha and omega, which referenced the Second Coming of Christ. The central image was surrounded by a legend with the Master's name followed by the official designation CVSTOS.

== Final years ==
The last mention of Raymond du Puy dates from 25 October 1158 in Verona and the first mention of his successor is from 29 November 1160. According to the Cartulaire général de l'Ordre des Hospitaliers, Numbers 70, 136 and 527:

Not that Raymond can be proved to have given to his order anything of its later aristocratic constitution. There is no mention in his Rule of the division into knights, chaplains and sergeants; indeed, there is no mention of any military duties whatever. It merely lays down certain rules of conduct and discipline for the brethren. They are to be bound by the threefold vow of chastity, poverty and obedience. They are to claim nothing for themselves save bread, water and raiment; and this latter is to be of poor quality, “since our Lord's poor, whose servants we say we are, go naked and sordid, and it is a disgrace for the servant to be proud when his master is humble.” Finally, the brethren are to wear crosses on the breast of their capes and mantles, “ut Deus per ipsum vexillum et fidem et operationem et obedientiam nos custodiat.” Yet that Raymond laid down military regulations for the brethren is certain. Their underlying principle is revealed by a bull of pope Alexander III addressed (1178–1180) to the grand master Roger de Moulins, in which he bids him, “according to the custom of Raymond,” abstain from bearing arms save when the standard of the Cross is displayed either for the defence of the kingdom or in an attack on a “pagan” city.

History has left us with nothing on his end, whether he died during his journey or on his return to the Holy Land, we know nothing about it. He was succeeded by Auger de Balben.

== Representations ==
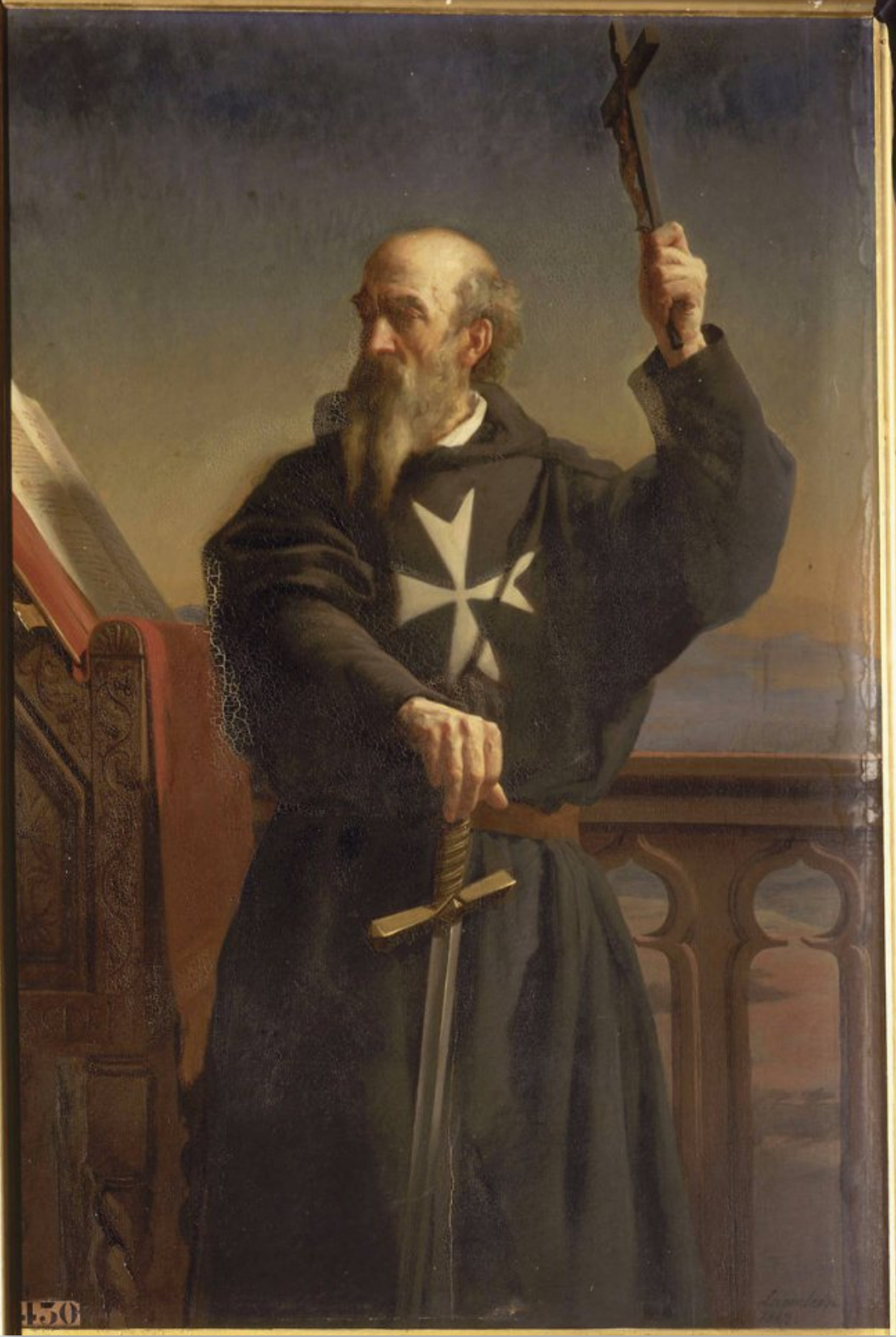
Raymond du Puy par Alexandre Laemlein dans la salle des Croisades du château de Versailles

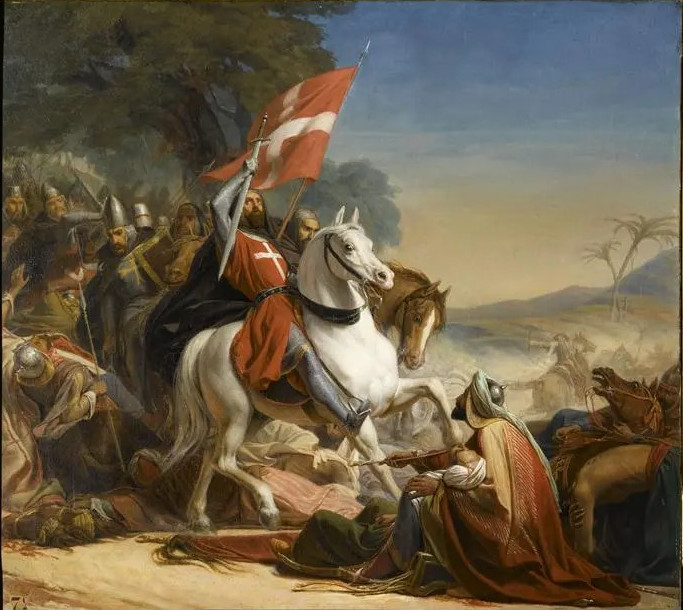
Défense de la Celesyrie par Raymond du Puy par Édouard Cibot dans les salles des Croisades du château de Versailles

In the rooms of the Salles des Croisades (Hall of Crusades) at the Château de Versailles, there is a full-length portrait of Raymond du Puy painted in 1842 by Alexandre Laemlein in the Third Room of the hall. In the Second Room, there are two battle scenes: Defense of Celesyria by Raymond Dupuy painted by Édouard Cibot in 1844; and Raymond of Puy takes body of Turks as prisoners by an unknown artist. Both scenes represent military action in Syria around 1130. All the representations of Raymond du Puy are works of the imagination, which are naturally not based on any period source.

Also in the rooms of the Salles des Croisades are his coat of arms is given as follows: Écartelé aux 1 et 4 de gueules à la croix d’argent et aux 2 et 3 d’or au lion de gueules (qui est du Puy). This attribution is not based on any period source, as original documents for the great masters of the twelfth century do not exist.

A medal, reported in the eighteenth century, was engraved in his honor with the inscription: ROGATE LEGES AUSPICE.

Four stamps were printed by the Poste Magistrali of the Sovereign Order of Malta: in 1969, stamp of a scudo where Raymond du Puy is represented in bust, following a representation of Jean-François Cars, around 1725; in 1976, stamp of 90 grani where Raymond du Puy is represented in foot, following a representation of Bosio; in 1979, stamp of a scudo with the supposed coat of arms of Raymond du Puy, following a reproduction of the room of the crusades of the museum of Versailles; in 2004, stamp of a tari in homage to Raymond du Puy, resuming, by modifying it, the tomb described by L. F. de Villeneuve-Bargemont27. These stamps of the magisterial post are not recognized by the Universal Postal Union (UPU).

As we know neither when nor where Raymond du Puy died, we know nothing about his tomb. L. F. de Villeneuve-Bargemont proposes an engraved representation of a tomb or a cenotaph, with a sculpture that represents him seated, with the inscription: MCLXXXVIII. A RAYMOND DU PUY, PREMIER GRAND-MAITRE DE L'HÔPITAL, APRÈS DE FAIBLES COMMENCEMENS, IL INSTITUA POUR SON ORDRE LES CEREMONIES DU CULTE, ET LUI DONNA LE MANTEAU NOIR? PORTANT LA CROIX BLANCHE A HUIT POINTES. He was the first grand master of the hospital, after a weak beginning, and he instituted for his order ceremonies of worship, and gave him the black cloak.

== See also ==
- Cartulaire général de l'Ordre des Hospitaliers
- List of Knights Hospitaller sites
- Langue (Knights Hospitaller)
- Flags of the Knights Hospitaller

== Bibliography ==
- Asbridge, Thomas (2012). The Crusades: The War for the Holy Land. Simon & Schuster. ISBN 978-1-84983-688-3.
- Barber, Malcolm (2012). The New Knighthood. A History of the Order of the Temple. Cambridge University Press. ISBN 978-1107604735.
- Barker, Ernest (1923). The Crusades. World's manuals. Oxford University Press, London.
- Boas, Adrian J. (2009). Jerusalem in the Time of the Crusades: Society, Landscape and Art in the Holy City Under Frankish Rule. Routledge. ISBN 9780415230001.
- Chassaing, Augustin (1888). Cartulaire des hospitaliers (Ordre de saint-Jean de Jérusalem) du Velay. Alphonse Picard, Paris.
- Claverie, Pierre-Vincent (2005). L'ordre du Temple en Terre Sainte et à Chypre au XIIIe siècle. Nicosia: Centre de Recherche Scientifique. ISBN 9789963080946.
- Delaville Le Roulx, Joseph (1895). Inventaire des pièces de Terre-Sainte de l'ordre de l'Hôpital. Revue de l'Orient Latin, Tome III. pp. 12 v.
- Delaville Le Roulx, Joseph (1904). Les Hospitaliers en Terre Sainte et à Chypre (1100-1310). E. Leroux, Paris.
- Demurger, Alain (2013). Les Hospitaliers, De Jérusalem à Rhodes 1050-1317. Tallandier, Paris. ISBN 979-1021000605.
- Flavigny, Bertrand Galimard (2006). Histoire de l'ordre de Malte. Perrin, Paris. ISBN 978-2262021153.
- Harot, Eugène (1911). Essai d'armorial des grands maîtres de l'Ordre de Saint-Jean de Jérusalem. Collegio araldico.
- Josserand, Philippe (2009). Prier et combattre, Dictionnaire européen des ordres militaires au Moyen Âge. Fayard, Paris. ISBN 978-2213627205.
- Lock, Peter (2006). The Routledge Companion to the Crusades. Routledge. doi:10.4324/9780203389638. ISBN 0-415-39312-4.
- Murray, Alan V. (2006). The Crusades—An Encyclopedia. ABC-CLIO. ISBN 978-1-57607-862-4.
- Nicholson, Helen J. (2001). The Knights Hospitaller. Boydell & Brewer. ISBN 978-1843830382.
- Pringle, Denys (2010). The Churches of the Crusader Kingdom of Jerusalem: Volume 3, The City of Jerusalem: A Corpus. Cambridge University Press. ISBN 978-0521172837.
- Riley-Smith, Jonathan (2012). The Knights Hospitaller in the Levant, c. 1070-1309. Palgrave Macmillan. ISBN 978-0-230-29083-9.
- Runciman, Steven (1952). A History of the Crusades, Volume Two: The Kingdom of Jerusalem and the Frankish East, 1100-1187. Cambridge University Press. ISBN 9780521347716.
- Setton, Kenneth M. (1969). A History of the Crusades. Six Volumes. University of Wisconsin Press.
- Tyerman, Christopher (2006). God's War: A New History of the Crusades. Belknap Press. ISBN 978-0-674-02387-1.
- Vann, Theresa M. (2006). Order of the Hospital. The Crusades––An Encyclopedia, pp. 598–605.

Preceded by Blessed Gerard	Grand Master of the Knights Hospitaller; 1120–1160	Succeeded by Auger de Balben
