= Villa Malta =

Villa Malta may refer to:

- Villa Malta (Pincio hill), headquarters of La Civiltà Cattolica in Rome, Italy
- Villa del Priorato di Malta on the Aventine Hill in Rome, Italy
- Villa Malta (Cologne), Germany
- Villa Pagana in Rapallo, Italy
