= Armengol de Aspa =

Grand Master of the Knights Hospitaller (1188–1190)

Armengol de Aspa (died after April 1191), also known as Hermangard d'Asp, was the ninth Grand Master of the Knights Hospitaller, holding the office from 1188 until his resignation in 1189 or 1190. He succeeded William Borrel who was interim Grand Master. It was under his magistracy that the headquarters of the Order was transferred from Jerusalem to Tyre. It was probably during the winter of 1189 or 1190 that Armengol's magistracy ceased, but this was not due to his death, since he appears again as lord of Amposta from December 1190 to April 1191. We have no information on what this first abdication in the history of the Order was, but he was succeeded by Garnier de Nablus sometime in 1190.

== Early years ==
There is no available information on his origin, but his first name and surname link him to the Vivarais, Biscay, or more likely Catalonia (Aspa, Lleida). As he had the responsibility of the Castellany of Amposta (1180-1182), we can believe him to be of that origin. The fact that he had the responsibility of Amposta at the same time as the great Priory of Saint-Gilles made him one of the most prominent dignitaries of the Hospitallers. The first mention of him was In 1164, when Armengol was a commander, was probably present at the commandery of Le Puy.

On 1 May 1187, Grand Master Roger de Moulins was killed in the Battle of Cresson and William Borrel, then Grand Commander of the Knights Hospitaller, was elevated to Grand Master. Borrel appointed Armengol as his replacement as Grand Commander. Nothing indicates the date of his magistracy. In May 1188, he was a witness for interim Grand Master William Borrel and in October 1188, he was Grand Master, so it was between May and October that his appointment took place.

== The Holy Land after the fall of Jerusalem ==
Even after the Siege of Jerusalem ended on 2 October 1187, the Franks remained under attack at the Siege of Tyre. The city had been under siege since August, and Saladin had come in person on 11 November 1187 to reinforce and support his troops. Some help for the besieged in the form of men and supplies had been able to be brought in be by sea, defended by Conrad of Montferrat. The stubborn resistance of the besieged forced Saladin to lift the siege on 1 January 1188. This was significant naval success of the Franks. On 30 December 1187, they had forced the blockade of the port, captured eleven Ayyubid galleys and taken as prisoner nine emirs, including that of Alexandria. Armengol, as grand commander, had led the Hospitallers in the defense alongside the Templars led by Gerard de Ridefort.

By the beginning of 1188, the Franks had lost Judea, Samaria and Galilee, but retained Tyre. The castle at Margat was so difficult to assault that Saladin did not even attempt a siege there. The Hospitallers, since August 1187, had been defending Belvoir Castle. Saladin sent his general Sayf al-Din Mahmūd to continue the siege, establishing his forces in the nearby castle at Le Forbelet ('Afrbalā). On 2 January 1188, the Hospitallers attacked and decimated the Muslim troops, killing Mahmūd and captured a large cache of arms. Belvoir Castle nevertheless succumbed to the siege on 5 January 1189, with the Hospitaller established as a formidable fighting force.

Saladin's offensive of 1188 was begun in March. In early July, losses included Tortosa (except for the Tower of the Templars); the Hospitaller-controlled Valenia; Gibelacar (15 July); and Laodicea (23 July). The castles of Sanyun and La Roche de Roussel (Chafik-Arnoun) suffered the same fate that month. Darbsak and Baghras (Gaston), defended by the Templars, succumbed after a short siege in mid-September, leaving the road to Antioch open. Margat, defended by the Hospitallers, resisted, and Antioch only escaped the Ayyubids by promising to open its gates if, within seven months, it had not received any Christian help. To the east, beyond the Jordan, al-Adil I, brother of Saladin, attacked the castles of Krak des Chevaliers and Montreal, surrendering for lack of supplies at the end of September 1188. The Siege of Safed, taking the castle belonging to the Temple saw capitulation on November 30. The Hospitallers held out until 3 January 1189 at Belvoir Castle, and only famine was able to overcome their resistance.

== The siege of Acre ==
Acre, along with Beirut and Sidon, capitulated without a fight to the Ayyubid sultan Saladin in 1187, after his decisive victory at Hattin and the subsequent Muslim capture of Jerusalem. It was during his magistracy in the summer of 1189 that Guy de Lusignan believed he could attack Saladin, beginning the Siege of Acre. He concentrated his forces, reinforced by the arrival of new crusaders, in Acre in September. On 4 October, he attacked Saladin in four forces, the first formed by the Hospitallers under the command of Lusignan, the second by the forces of Conrad of Montferrat, the third by the crusaders under the command of Louis III of Thuringia, and the fourth by the Knights Templars with the remainder of the troops. But the left wing of the attackers lost contact with the right wing as the forces of Saladin came to break in the camp of the Christians. Saladin's retreat allowed the complete conquest of Acre, and the Hospitallers and Conrad took up positions to the north. They fortified the position with two ditches and created the new port known as the marquis. Throughout the winter, the Christian forces were reinforced in preparation for the next campaign. In 1188, the Order, whose headquarters were then in Tyre, appointed Armengol to replace Roger de Moulins as Grand Master.

== Abdication and transition ==
It was probably in the last months of 1189, or at the latest in the winter of 1190, that the magistracy of Armengol came to an end, based on date of the assumption of office by Garnier de Nablus. The reason for Armengol's apparent abdication is unknown, as contemporary accounts do not mention his departure. The historiographers of the Order simply note that the enemies of the faith–the Muslims or the bad Christians of the Holy Land–persecuted him, claiming incorrectly that under his magisterium Jerusalem fell to the Infidèles, and that he did not survive long after the fall of the Holy City. These early historians of the Order also incorrectly identified the order in which Armengol and Garnier served as well as inserting a certain Raymond-Bérenger into the mix. Arnemgol died sometime after April 1191.

== See also ==
- Cartulaire général de l'Ordre des Hospitaliers
- List of Knights Hospitaller sites
- Langue (Knights Hospitaller)
- Flags of the Knights Hospitaller

== Bibliography ==
- Barber, Malcolm (2012). The New Knighthood. A History of the Order of the Temple. Cambridge University Press. ISBN 978-1107604735.
- Bronstein, Judith (2005). The Hospitallers and the Holy Land: Financing the Latin East, 1187-1274. Boydell Press. ISBN 9781843831310.
- Delaville Le Roulx, Joseph (1904). Les Hospitaliers en Terre Sainte et à Chypre (1100-1310). E. Leroux, Paris.
- Demurger, Alain (2013). Les Hospitaliers, De Jérusalem à Rhodes 1050-1317. Tallandier, Paris. ISBN 979-1021000605.
- Harot, Eugène (1911). Essai d'armorial des grands maîtres de l'Ordre de Saint-Jean de Jérusalem. Collegio araldico.
- Josserand, Philippe (2009). Prier et combattre, Dictionnaire européen des ordres militaires au Moyen Âge. Fayard, Paris. ISBN 978-2213627205.
- Lane-Poole, Stanley (1898). Saladin and the Fall of the Kingdom of Jerusalem. Heroes of the nations [v. 24]. Putnam and Sons, New York. ISBN 9780524007624.
- Lewis, Kevin James (2017). The Counts of Tripoli and Lebanon in the Twelfth Century: Sons of Saint-Gilles. Routledge. ISBN 978-1-4724-5890-2.
- Lock, Peter (2006). The Routledge Companion to the Crusades. Routledge. doi:10.4324/9780203389638. ISBN 0-415-39312-4.
- Luttrell, Anthony (2005). "Ermengol de Aspa, Provisor of the Hospital: 1188". Crusades. 4 (1): 15–19. doi:10.1080/28327861.2005.12220416.
- Murray, Alan V. (2006). The Crusades—An Encyclopedia. ABC-CLIO. ISBN 978-1-57607-862-4.
- Nicholson, Helen J. (2001). The Knights Hospitaller. Boydell & Brewer. ISBN 978-1843830382.
- Runciman, Steven (1952). A History of the Crusades, Volume Two: The Kingdom of Jerusalem and the Frankish East, 1100-1187. Cambridge University Press. ISBN 9780521347716.
- Setton, Kenneth M. (1969). A History of the Crusades. University of Wisconsin Press.
- Tyerman, Christopher (2006). God's War: A New History of the Crusades. Belknap Press. ISBN 978-0-674-02387-1.
- Vann, Theresa M. (2006). Order of the Hospital. The Crusades––An Encyclopedia, pp. 598–605.

Preceded by William Borrel	Grand Master of the Knights Hospitaller; 1187–1190	Succeeded by Garnier de Nablus
