= Gilbert of Assailly =

Gilbert of Assailly (died 1183) was the master of the Knights Hospitaller, serving from 1162 or 1163 to 1170, when he was deposed. As Grand Master, he succeeded Auger de Balben (rather than Arnaud de Comps that some compilations listed). Nevertheless, most sources list him as the fifth, rather than fourth, master and this biography continues that tradition, with the exception being Delaville Le Roulx' work. He was succeeded by Gastone de Murols. Gilbert encouraged Amalric of Jerusalem in his unsuccessful invasion of Egypt, leaving the Order in debt and causing the reexamination of its military role.

== Biography ==
Little was known of Gilbert before his elevation to the magistracy of the Hospitallers' Order other than he was already old when it was conferred on him, and that the termination of his name suggests that he was of French origin and considered to be a knight. It is with him that the Order became truly military, which is indicated in a letter addressed to Bertrandus, Archbishop of Trani.

An undated act also states that Amalric of Nesle, the Latin Patriarch of Jerusalem, solicited aid from Westerners in favor of the Holy Land and recommended that the prelates and princes welcome Gilbert as the new Grand Master. Also, through an important act of donation in favor of the Order, we know that it was in Le Puy on 15 August 1166 with Raymond V of Toulouse.

During his magisterium, the Order acquired territories in the County of Tripoli and the Principality of Antioch. Two acts of donation bear mentioning: the first in January 1168 from Bohemond III of Antioch and the second in 1170 from Amalric of Jerusalem during the captivity of Raymond III of Tripoli. They highlighted a transfer of regal rights to the Hospitallers and recognized military privileges above the common law, giving them a form of quasi-sovereignty. They also purchased the land for Castle Belvoir at Kawkab al-Hawa, north of Beit She'an, and otherwise expanded their fortifications. Gilbert also began regulating the constitution of the Order.

== Campaigns against Egypt ==
Gilbert is principally remembered for his militancy related to the Crusader invasion of Egypt, and he encouraged Amalric of Jerusalem to declare war on Egypt in order to expand territories of the kingdom. In the summer of 1164, a Frankish army accompanied by large contingents of Templars and Hospitallers led by Bohemond III of Antioch, Raymond III of Tripoli, Joscelin III of Edessa, Hugh VIII Lusignan and Constantine Kalamanos, Byzantine governor of Cilicia, was deployed. On 12 August 1164, this force was defeated at the Battle of Harim by Nur ad-Din, ruler of the Zengid dynasty. The latter pushed his advantage by taking the city of Banias on October 18, 1164, key to the passage between Tyre and Damascus. Nur ad-Din late agreed to a treaty on the basis of half-sharing with the Christian troops of the territory of Tiberias.

In 1167, Shirkuh, governor of Egypt, deposed by the usurper Shawar, received permission from Nur ad-Din to reconquer Egypt. He gathered an army in Syria and came to set up his camp at Giza, opposite Cairo. Amalric learned of this and wanted to cut the road to Shirkuh, but arrived too late, and withdrew to Ascalon to complete his army, including the Hospitallers. On 30 January 1167, he headed for Bilbeis, via Gaza and el-Arich. Shawar, sensing the danger, allied with Amalric and allowed the Christian troops to enter Cairo. On 18 March 18, they were defeated at the Battle of al-Babein, and returned to Cairo. They then besieged Alexandria. After 75 days of siege, Shirkuh sued for peace. He left the land to Shawar, returned to Syria with his army providing the Christians, a significant financial compensation.

Gilbert, still convinced that the conquest of Egypt would be a good thing, provided in October 1168 one thousand knights and Turcopoles to the army. In exchange he asked to own Bilbeis and a vast territory between Syria and the sea. Amalric set out at the end of October, without waiting for the reinforcements promised by Manuel I Komnenos. On November 4, he seized Bilbeis and on November 13 he was neared Cairo. The Egyptians were determined to defend themselves and Nur ad-Din, Shirkuh and Shawar made an alliance. Amalric's fleet after taking Tinnis could not go up the Nile and was ordered to withdraw. Amalric offered Shawar a withdrawal in exchange for a large tribute of a million besants, but the approach of Shirkuh forces him to lower his demands by half. On 2 January 1169, the troops of Jerusalem withdrew from Cairo.

Amalric decided to send an embassy to the West made up of the Archbishop of Tyre, Frederick de la Roche, the Bishop of Banias, and Guy de Mauny, the Grand Commander of the Hospitallers, to ask for assistance. In July 1169, the embassy was at the papal court of Alexander III, in September and November, at the court of Louis VII of France and then at the court of Henry II of England. After two years of absence, the embassy returned to Jerusalem empty handed.

In the fall of 1169, Amalric, with the help of Manuel I Komnenos and the Hospitallers, began his fourth campaign against Egypt. There again a financial treaty was made with the Hospitallers, with Bilbeis and the adjacent territory promised. The objective was Damietta, with the Greek and Frankish fleets laying siege by sea and by land at the end of October. But the expedition failed once more, and returned to Tyre on 7 December 1169.

== Retirement and death ==
The 1168 expedition turned out disastrously, and Gilbert's position became untenable. Accused of having ruined the Order and neglected its charitable vocation, he resigned, then reconsidered his decision but refused the conditions imposed on him by the Convent. Heraclius of Jerusalem, as archdeacon of Jerusalem in 1169, tried unsuccessfully to persuade pope Alexander III to reinstate Gilbert as Grand Master, although the pope praised him for his presentation of the case. Gilbert retired to England, and the boat that was driving him, sank off Dieppe and he drowned on 19 September 1183.

== See also ==
- Cartulaire général de l'Ordre des Hospitaliers
- List of Knights Hospitaller sites
- Langue (Knights Hospitaller)
- Flags of the Knights Hospitaller

== Bibliography ==
- Baldwin, Marshall (1969). The Latin States under Baldwin III and Amalric I, 1143–1174 (PDF). A History of the Crusades (Setton), Volume I. Archived from the original (PDF) on 2020-12-05.
- Buffière, Félix (1985). Ce tant rude Gévaudan. Société des lettres sciences et arts de la Lozère. ISBN 9780996168083.
- Chassaing, Augustin (1888). Cartulaire des hospitaliers (Ordre de saint-Jean de Jérusalem) du Velay. Alphonse Picard, Paris.
- Claverie, Pierre-Vincent (2005). L'ordre du Temple en Terre Sainte et à Chypre au XIIIe siècle. Nicosia: Centre de Recherche Scientifique. ISBN 9789963080946.
- Delaville Le Roulx, Joseph (1895). Inventaire des pièces de Terre-Sainte de l'ordre de l'Hôpital. Revue de l'Orient Latin, Tome III. pp. 12 v.
- Delaville Le Roulx, Joseph (1904). Les Hospitaliers en Terre Sainte et à Chypre (1100-1310). E. Leroux, Paris.
- Demurger, Alain (2013). Les Hospitaliers, De Jérusalem à Rhodes 1050-1317. Tallandier, Paris. ISBN 979-1021000605.
- Flavigny, Bertrand Galimard (2006). Histoire de l'ordre de Malte. Perrin, Paris. ISBN 978-2262021153.
- Grousset, René (1935). Histoire des croisades et du royaume franc de Jérusalem. Perrin, Paris.
- Harot, Eugène (1911). Essai d'armorial des grands maîtres de l'Ordre de Saint-Jean de Jérusalem. Collegio araldico.
- Josserand, Philippe (2009). Prier et combattre, Dictionnaire européen des ordres militaires au Moyen Âge. Fayard, Paris. ISBN 978-2213627205.
- Murray, Alan V. (2006). The Crusades—An Encyclopedia. ABC-CLIO. ISBN 978-1-57607-862-4. Archived from the original on 2023-03-26.
- Nicholson, Helen J. (2001). The Knights Hospitaller. Boydell & Brewer. ISBN 978-1843830382.
- Runciman, Steven (1952). A History of the Crusades, Volume Two: The Kingdom of Jerusalem and the Frankish East, 1100-1187. Cambridge University Press. ISBN 9780521347716.
- Setton, Kenneth M. (1969). A History of the Crusades. Six Volumes. University of Wisconsin Press.
- Tyerman, Christopher (2006). God's War: A New History of the Crusades. Belknap Press. ISBN 978-0-674-02387-1.
- Vann, Theresa M. (2006). Order of the Hospital. The Crusades––An Encyclopedia, pp. 598–605.

Preceded by Auger de Balben	Grand Master of the Knights Hospitaller; 1163–1169	Succeeded by Gastone de Murols
