= Château de Condat, Dordogne =

Fortified former commandry of the Knights Hospitaller in France

Coordinates: 45°07′01″N 1°13′44″E

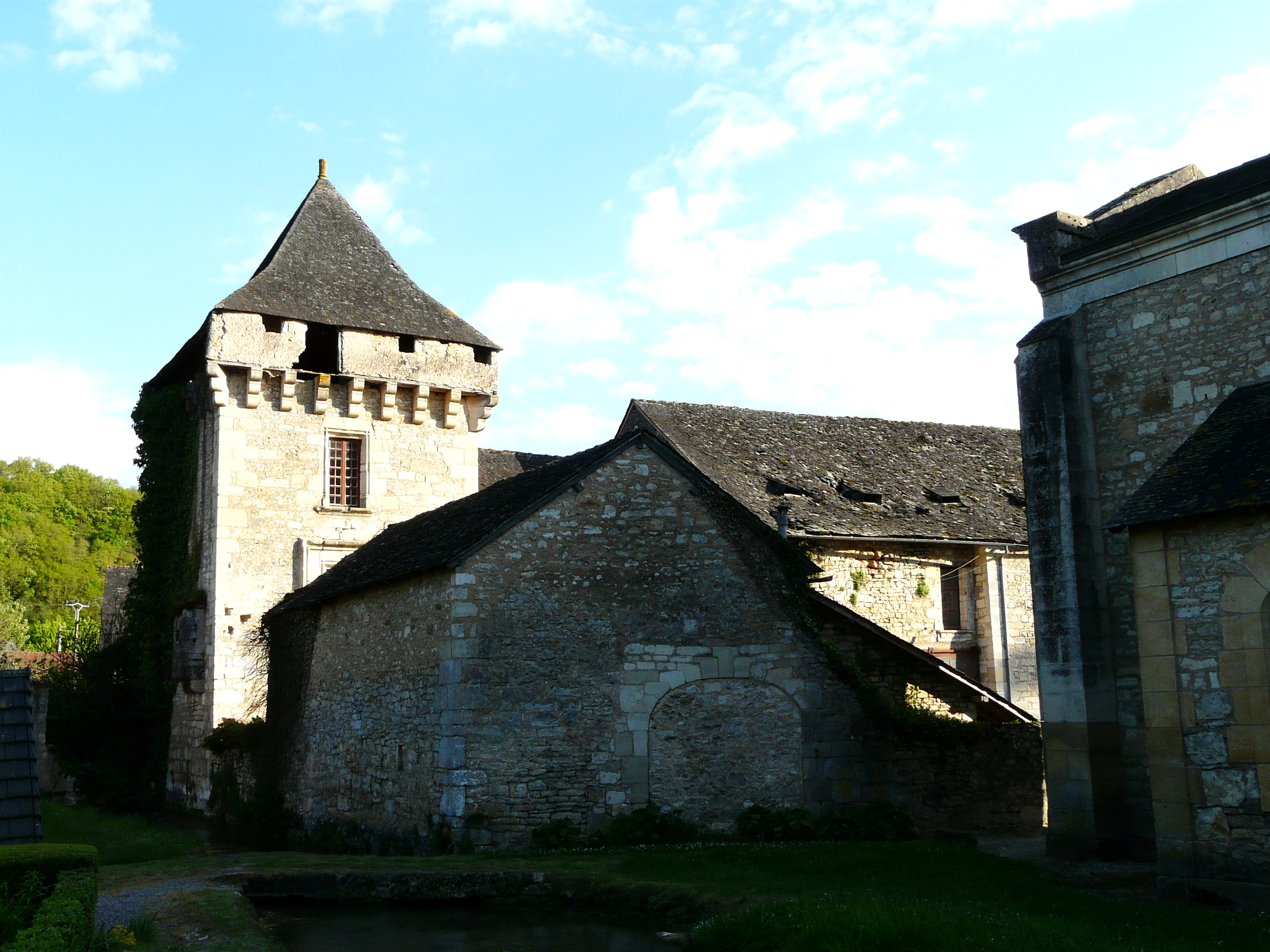

The Château de Condat is a fortified former commandry of the Knights Hospitaller located in the commune of Condat-sur-Vézère in the Dordogne département of France.

== History ==
The commandry was definitely founded in the 12th century, and restored around 1540.

The Château de Condat was the commandry for the Hospitallers who occupied the town from the 12th to the 18th centuries. Known as Hospitalis de Condato and documented since 1239, it served the functions of fortification, tithe barn, residence, hostel for pilgrims and hospital for the sick. It was the most important of the Hospitallers' commandries in Périgord.

During the Wars of Religion, the Huguenot leader, captain Pouch, transformed the church into a fortress that was besieged and taken by the seigneur of Losse.

Just as in the Wars of Religion, during the Fronde it changed hands several times.

After the Storming of the Bastille in 1789, the commandry was pillaged.

== Description ==
The edifice is an oblong structure, attached to a square 14th century keep with a chemin de ronde supported on corbels. In the opposite corner, a 16th-century turret has been reduced in height. It is completed by a second building, with a square defensive tower. The former moats have been filled in. The roof is covered with slate from Brive.

The Château de Condat is privately owned. It has been listed since 1948 as a monument historique by the French Ministry of Culture.

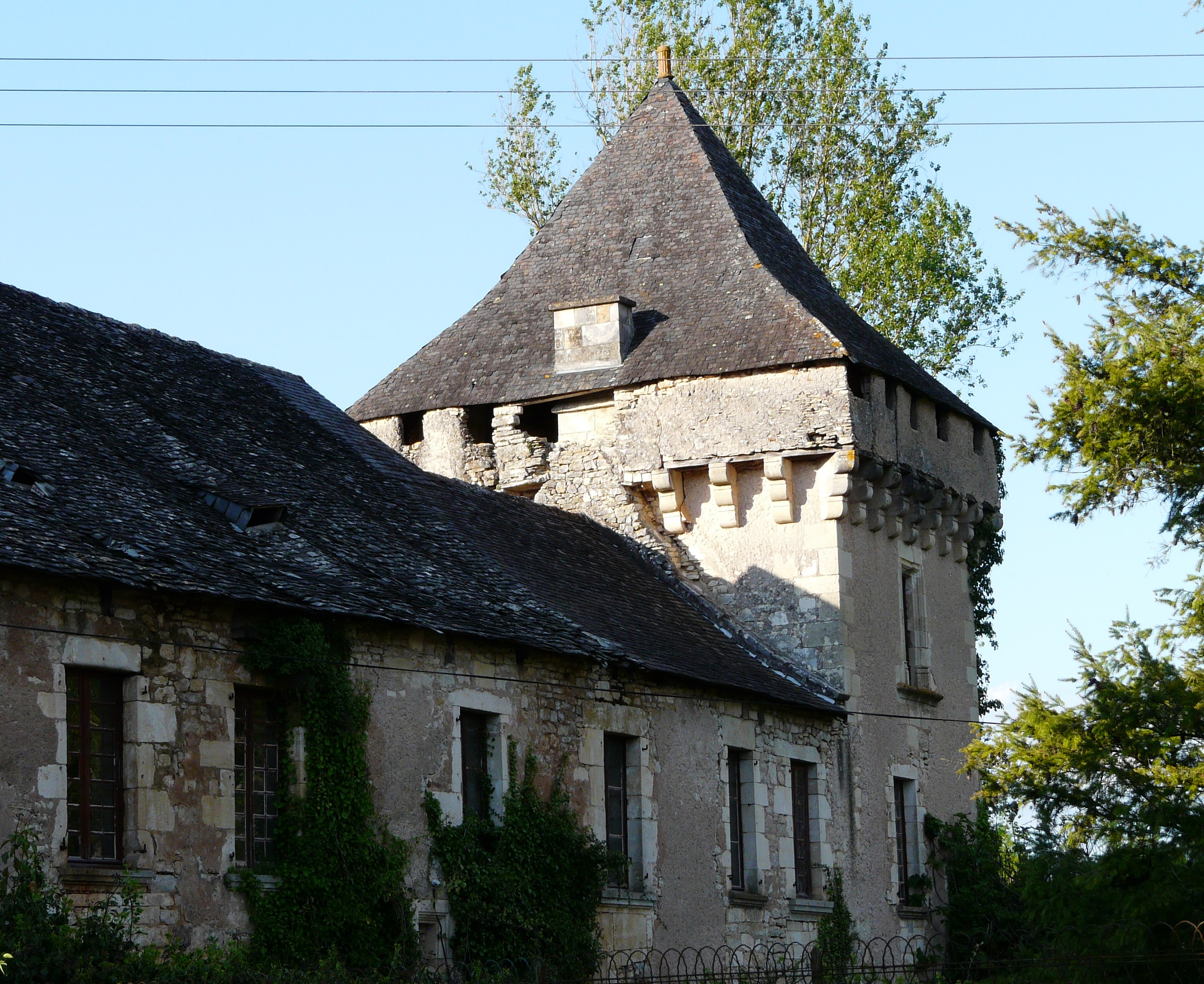

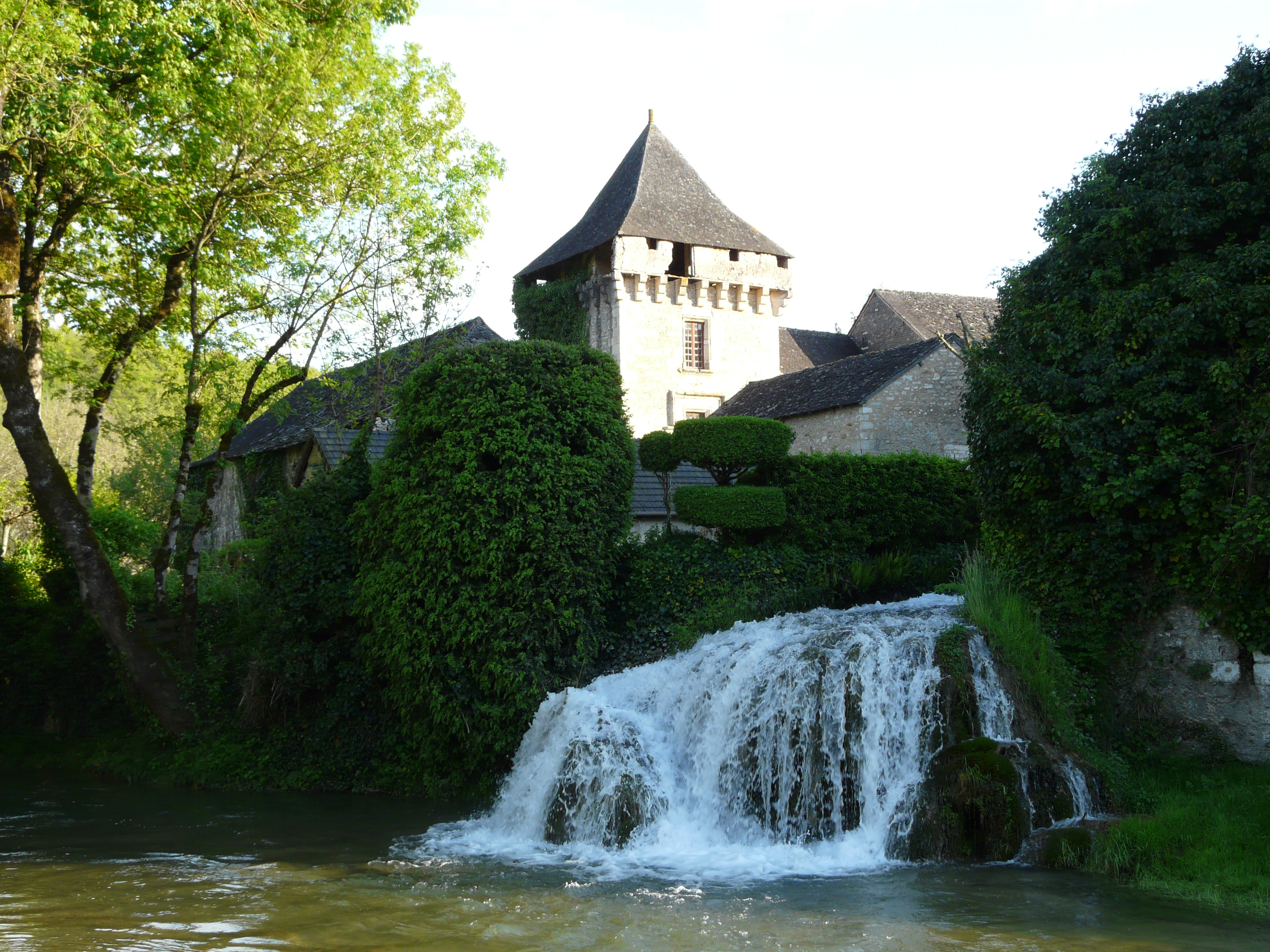

== See also ==
- List of castles in France
