= Villa Malta (Cologne) =

Building in Cologne, Germany

Coordinates: 50.896623°N 6.991361°E

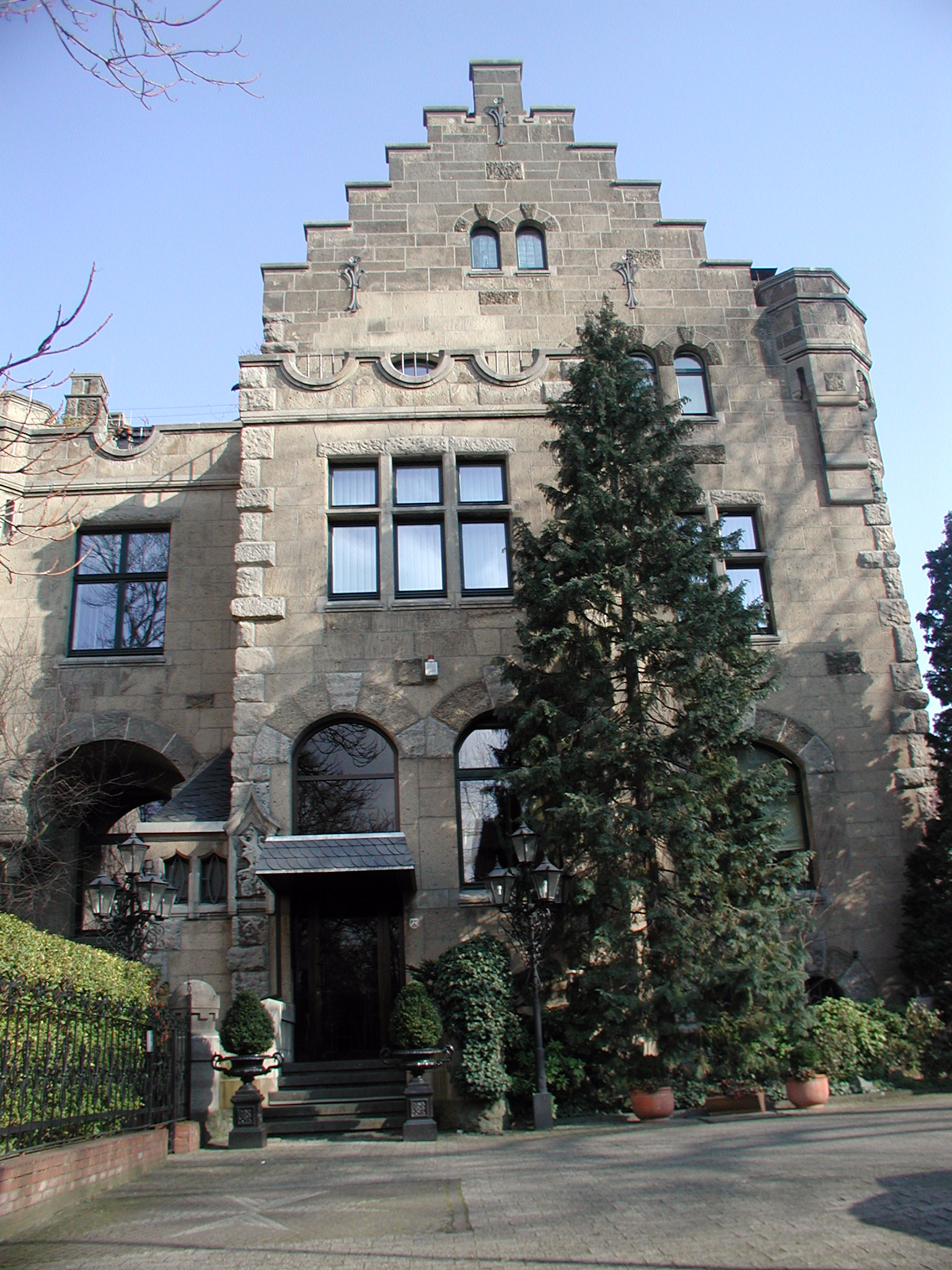
Villa Malta (2007)

Villa Malta (Cologne) is castle-like monument located in Cologne, Rodenkirchen. The establishment was built in May 1904. It was originally named "Villa Angonia". In 1919, Heinrich Rodenkirchen acquired the property. After World War II, the house was renamed "Villa Maria". In 1971, it became the property of the Sovereign Military Order of Malta, which gave it its present name. Villa Malta's architectural design draws from Art Nouveau and medieval styles.
