= List of Knights Hospitaller sites =

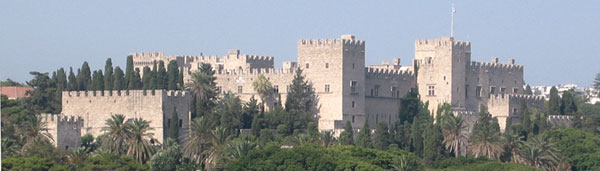
Palace of the Grand Master of the Knights of Rhodes, 14th century

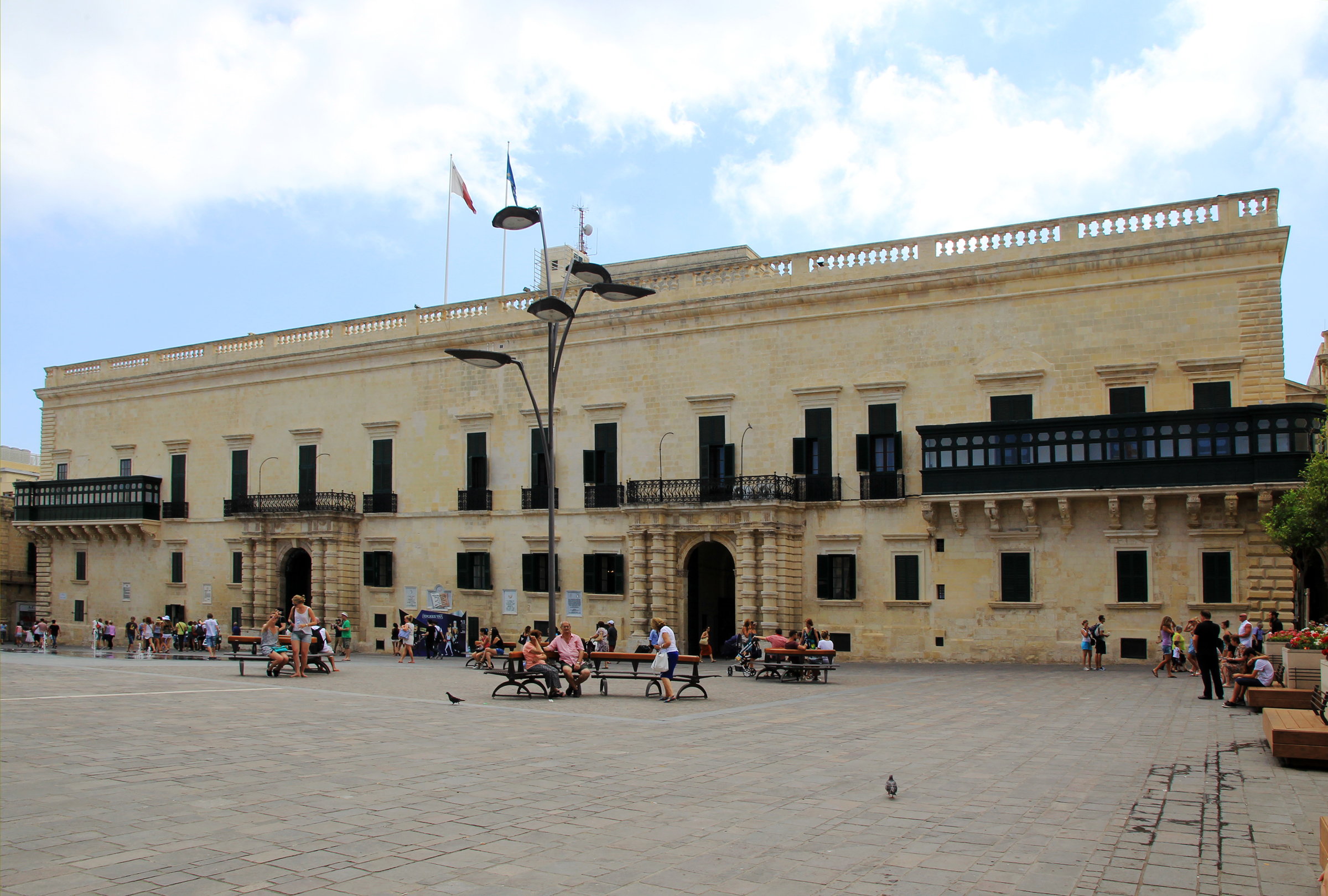
Grandmaster's Palace (Valletta), 16th-18th centuries

The Knights Hospitaller operated a wide network of properties in the Middle Ages from their successive seats in Jerusalem, Acre, Cyprus, Rhodes and eventually Malta. In the early 14th century, they received many properties and assets previously in the hands of the Knights Templar.

== Middle East ==
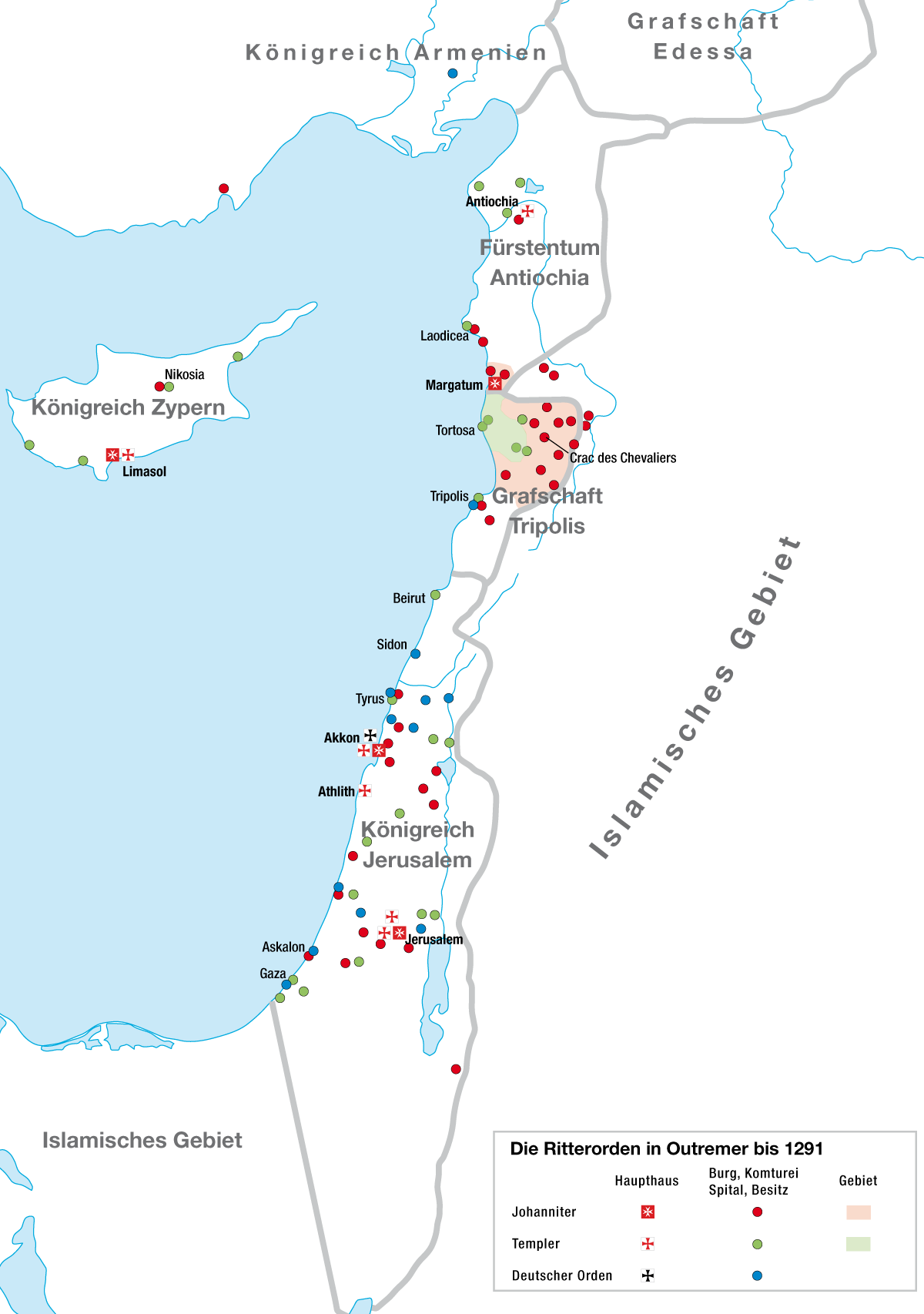
Order properties in the Middle East and Cyprus

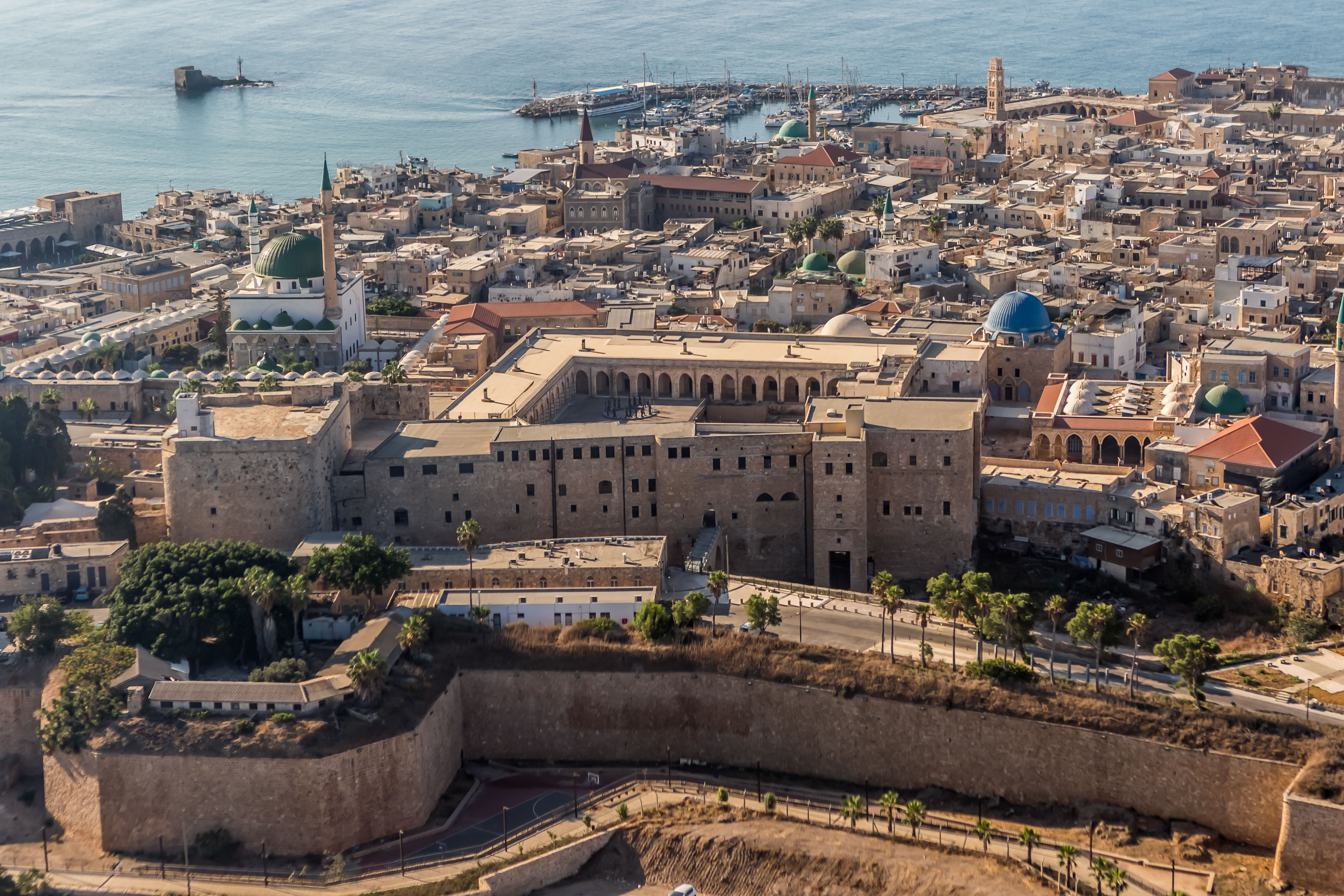
Hospitaller commandery of Saint-Jean-d'Acre, 12th-13th centuries

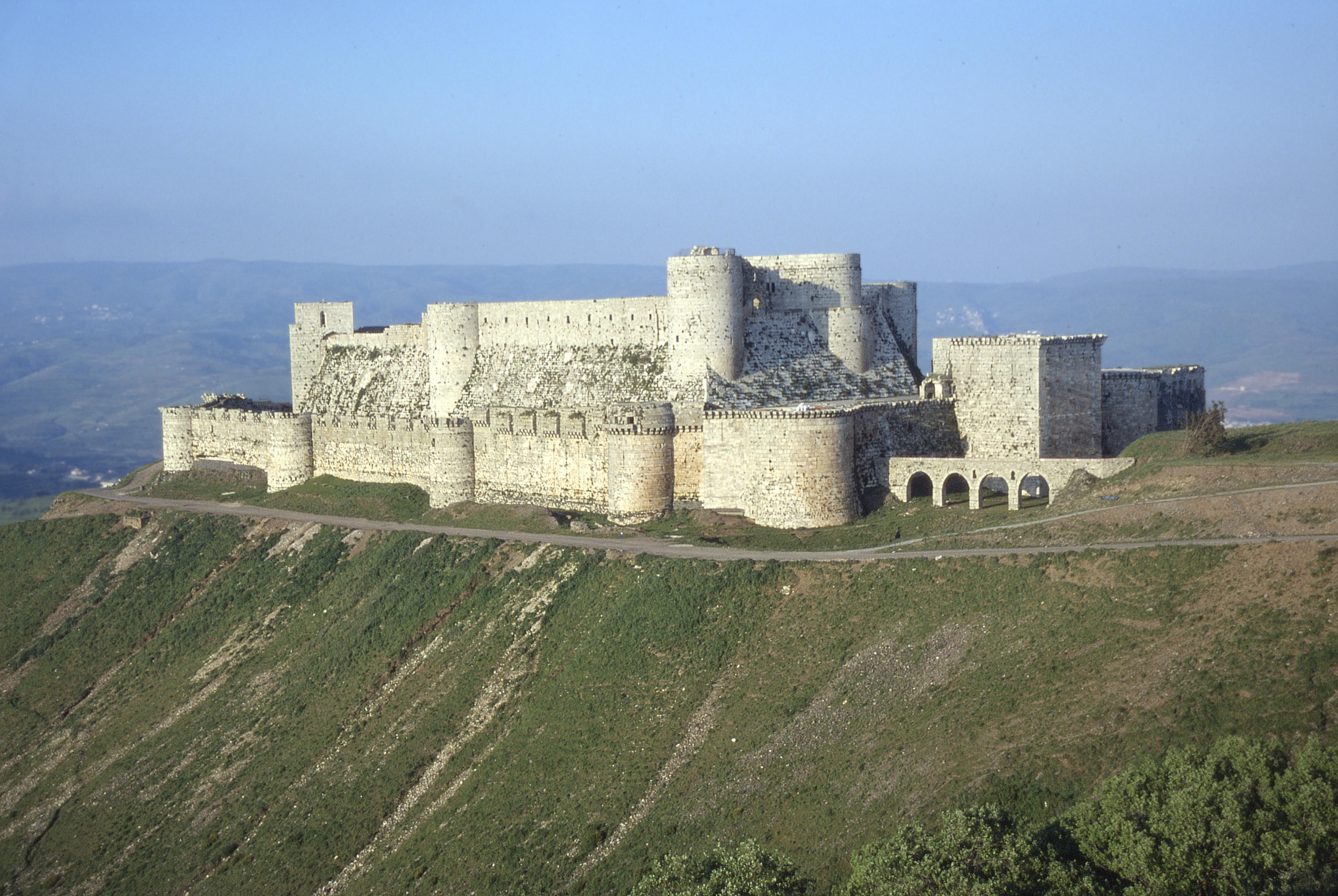
Krak des Chevaliers

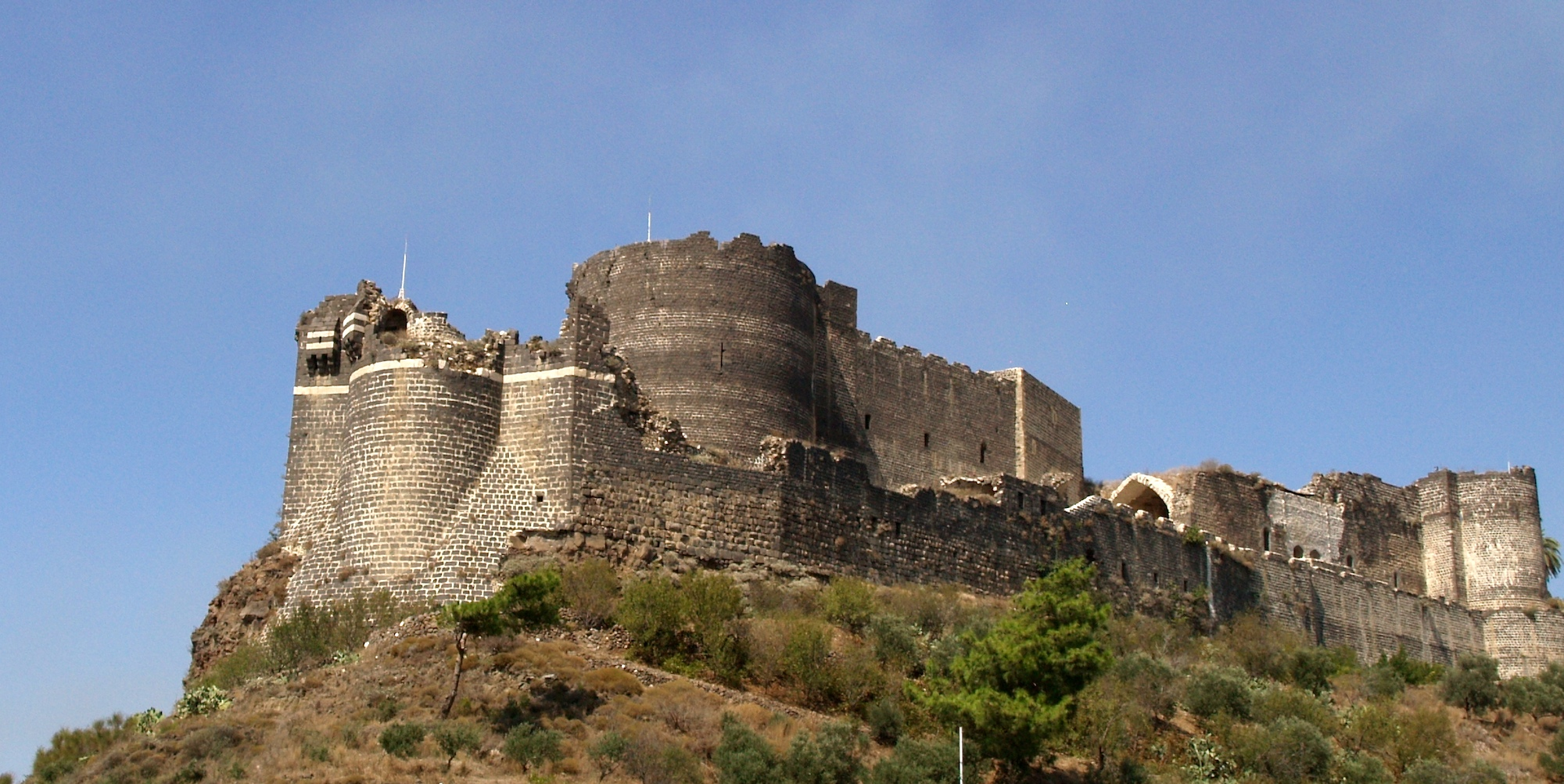
Margat

=== Kingdom of Jerusalem ===
This includes both the Kingdom of Jerusalem and its Vassal entities.

- The eponymous hospital, in the Christian Quarter of Jerusalem's neighborhood now known as Muristan just south of the Church of the Holy Sepulchre, including the Church of Saint John the Baptist, 1099–1187. The Hospitallers also held the Church of Saint Mary of the Germans for a brief period until 1244.
- The Hospitaller commandery of Saint-Jean-d'Acre, ca. 1130–1187 and 1191–1291; the Hospitallers administered the whole city of Acre from 1229 to its fall in 1291.
- Bayt Jibrin (Beth Gibelin) northwest of Hebron, 1136–1187
- the Benedictine monastery in Abu Ghosh near Jerusalem, built by the Hospitallers in 1140
- Belmont Castle by Suba near Jerusalem, 1160s–1187
- Aqua Bella (Arabic Khirbat Iqbalā), now Ein Hemed west of Jerusalem
- Arsur (Arabic Arsuf, ancient Apollonia) on the coast south of Netanya, 1261–1268
- Qalansawe (Calanson) inland from Netanya, 1128–1187 and 1191–1265
- Burgata north of Qalansawe, 1248–1265
- Tel Dothan (Castellum Beleismum or Chateau Saint-Job) southwest of Jenin, in 1187
- Qula, northeast of Ramla, in the 12th century
- Cafarlet, now Kafr Lam south of Haifa, 1232–1255
- Tel Yokneam (Caymont or Cain Mons) southeast of Haifa, 1256–1262
- Tel Afek (Recordane) east of Haifa, 1154–1291
- Taibe (Le Forbelet) in the Valley of Megiddo, until 1187
- Mount Tabor fortress, 1255–1263
- Belvoir Castle (Arabic Kawkab al-Hawa) near the Sea of Galilee, 1168–1189
- Banias (ancient Caesarea Philippi) near Mount Hermon, briefly around 1157
- Hunin (Castellum Novum or Chastel Neuf) at the Northern tip of Israel, also around 1157

=== County of Tripoli ===
- The Krak des Chevaliers (Hisn al-Akrad), the Hospitallers' major fortress in the Levant, 1142–1271
- Margat (Marqab) on the Syrian coast south of Latakia, the Knights' other major redoubt, 1186–1285
- Coliath or La Colée (Qalaat al-Qlaiaat), near the coast north of Tripoli
- Gibelacar (Hisn Ibn Akkar) in Northern Lebanon, 1170–1203
- Chastel Rouge (Qal’at Yahmur) on the coast just north of the Lebanese-Syrian border, ca. 1177–1289
- Arab al-Mulk (Belda or Beaude, in Arabic also Balda al-Milk or Beldeh) near Margat, 1160s–1271
- Qurfays (Corveis) also near Margat, until 1271

=== Cilicia ===
- Silifke Castle (Le Selef, ancient Seleucia) in modern Turkey, 1210–1226
- Tokmar Castle near Silifke, also from 1210

== Aegean Sea Region ==
The Eastern Mediterranean ca. 1450, with Hospitaller territories in blue

- the Hospital of Sampson in Constantinople, which the Hospitallers managed under the Latin Empire's rule until 1261
- The Hospitallers also operated hospitals in Negroponte and Corinth
- Kolossi Castle near Limassol in Cyprus, 1210–1570 with an interruption in 1306–1313. Limassol was the main seat of the Order between the fall of Acre in 1291 and the move to Rhodes in 1310
- Gastria Castle in Cyprus, from 1308
- Islands of the Dodecanese:

- Kastellorizo, 1306–1440
- Rhodes, 1306–1522 (the city of Rhodes 1310–1522)

- Tilos, 1309–1470
- Symi, 1309–1522
- Nisyros, 1315–1522
- Kos, 1337–1523
- Kalymnos, 1310–1522
- Leros, 1309–1522

- Smyrna, in whose conquest the Hospitallers took part and 1344 and whose defense they assumed 1374–1402
- The Principality of Achaea by lease from Joanna I of Naples, 1376–1381
- Corinth, 1397–1404
- Bodrum Castle, 1402–1523

== Western Europe ==
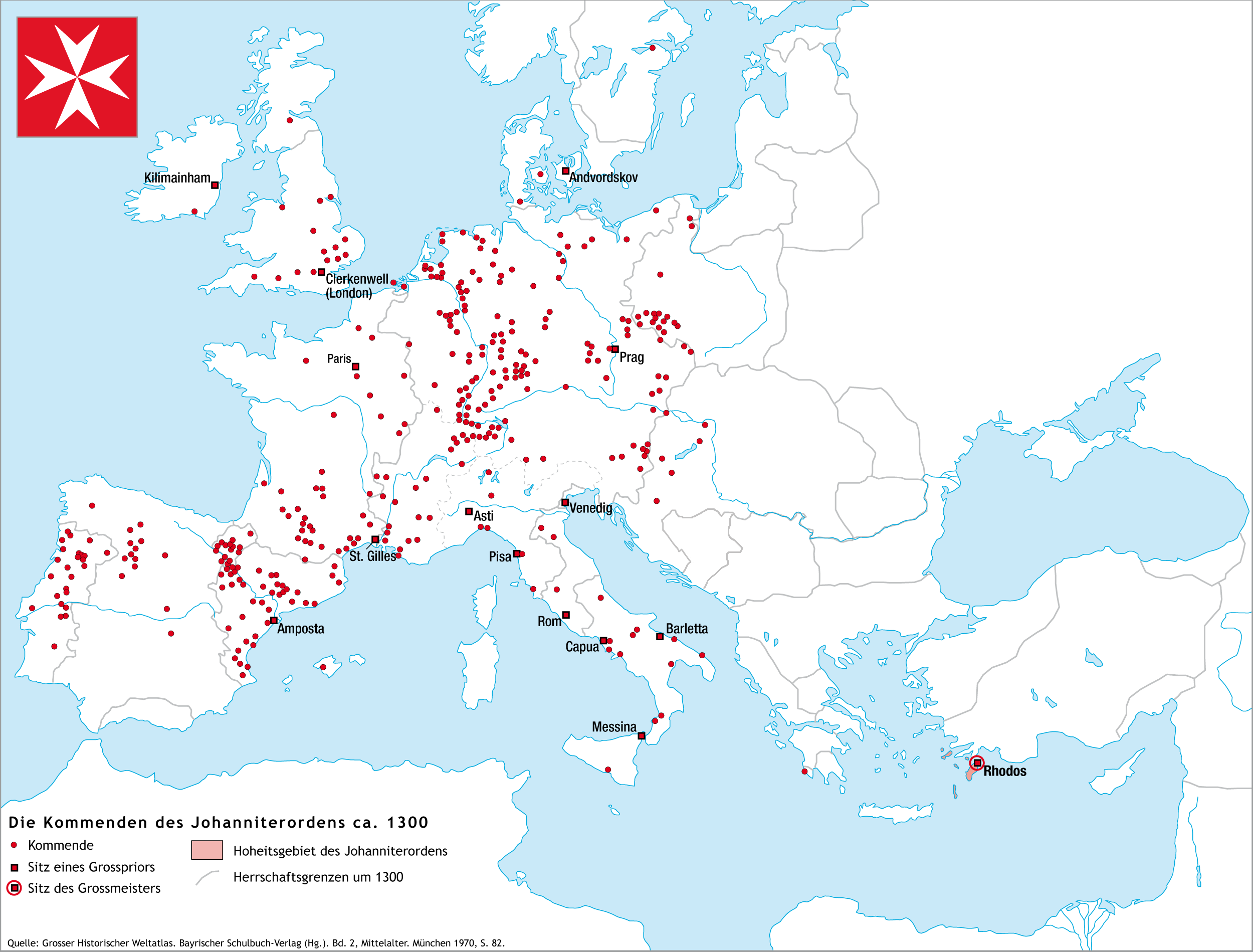
Hospitaller commandries in Europe, ca. 1300

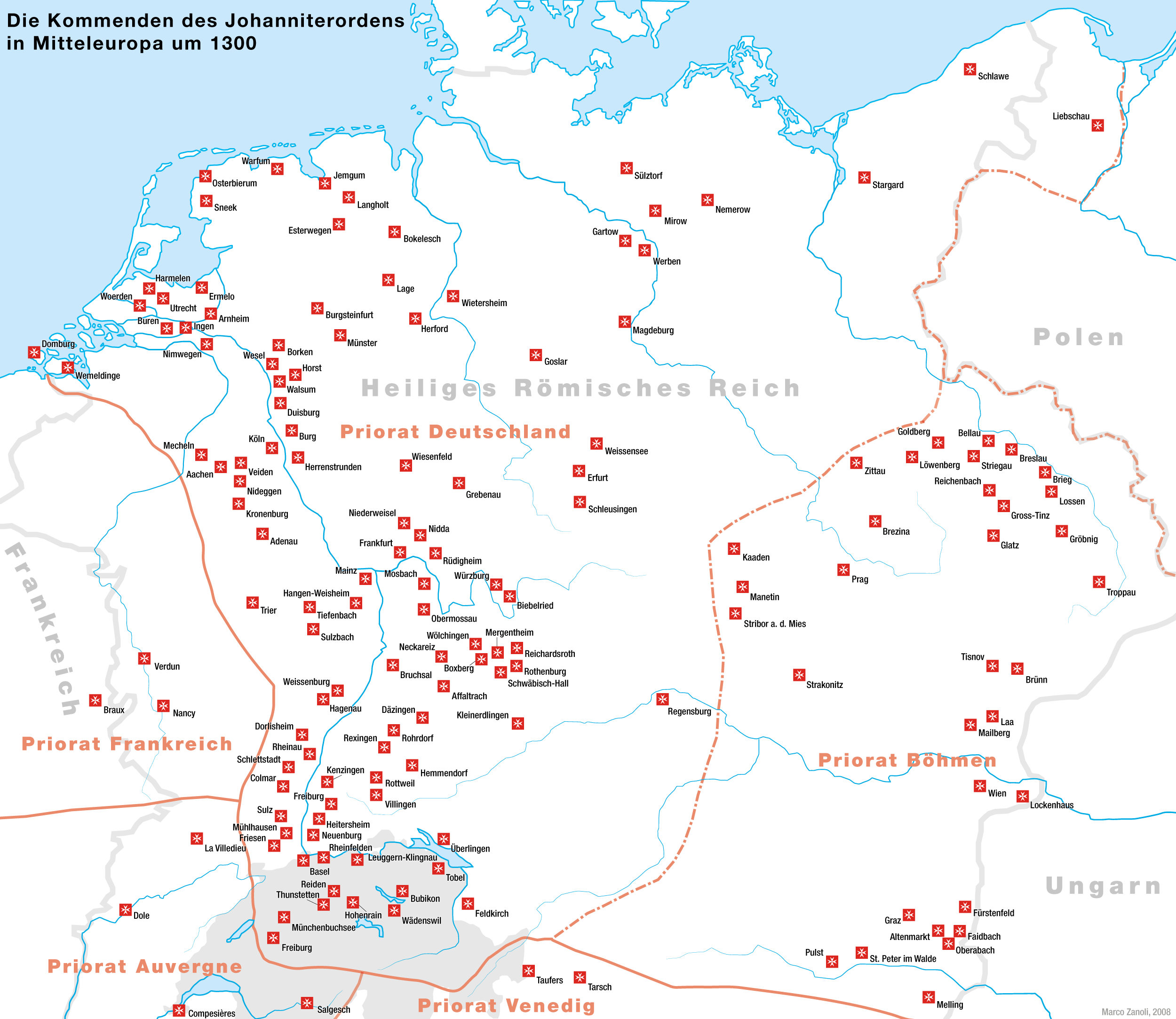
Central European commandries, ca. 1300

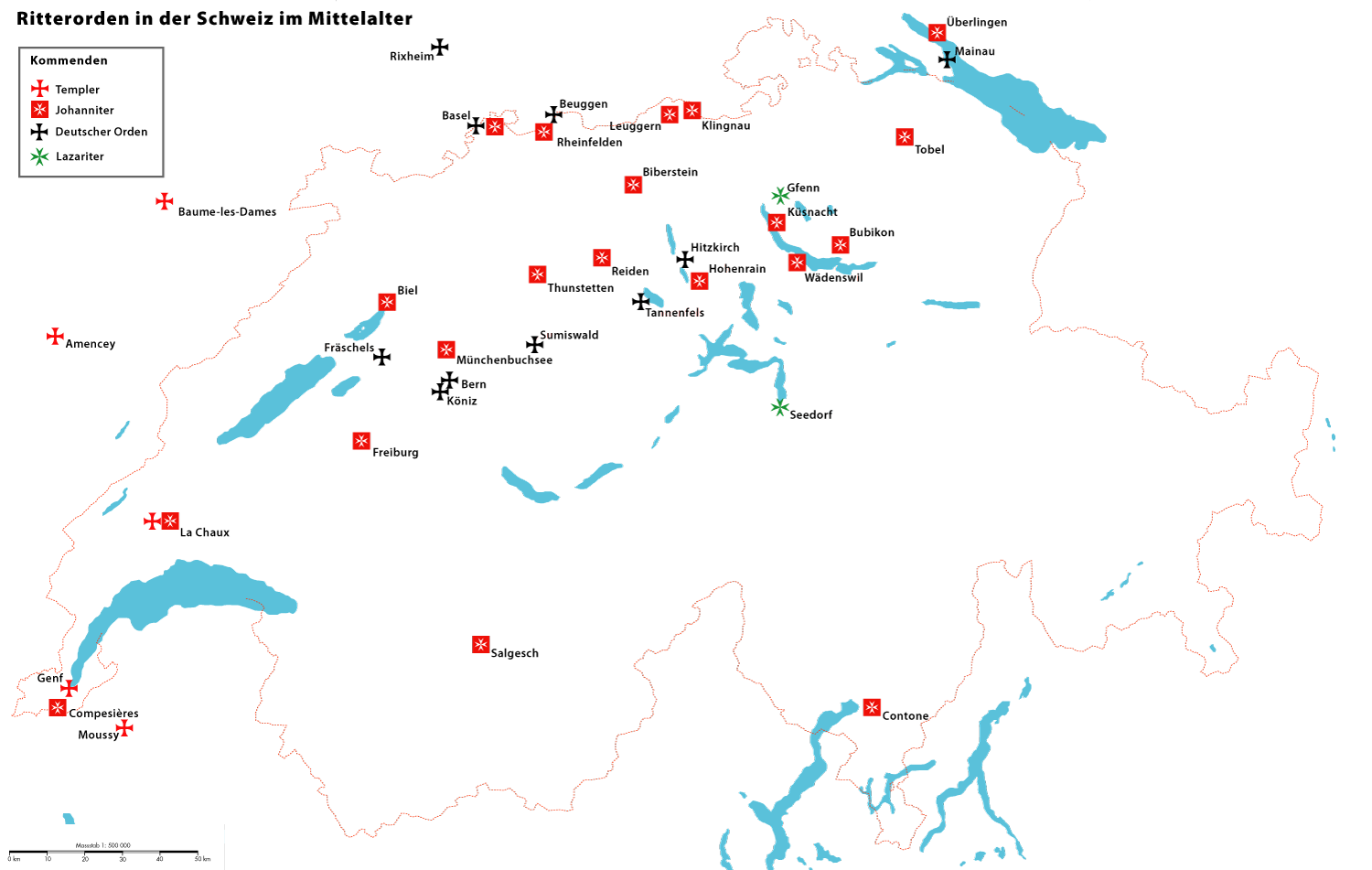
Swiss commandries

References to countries below are using 21st-century borders.

=== France ===
- Grand prieuré de Saint-Gilles in Saint-Gilles, Gard, 1109–1792
- Priory of Saint John in Paris (before 1130 - early 1790s)
- Hospital of the Holy Ghost, Montpellier, est. 1145
- Château de Condat, Dordogne, since the 12th century
- Hospice of Saint John, Nice
- Fort Saint-Jean (Marseille), initially built by the Hospitallers in the late 12th century
- Maison du Temple in Paris (on the location of the Square du Temple, transferred from the Knights Templar in 1313 and held until 1790
- Grand prieuré de Toulouse, 1317–1789
- Prieuré hospitalier d’Arles, 1562–1792
- Maison des chevaliers de Saint-Jean in Colmar, initially built in 1608

=== Italy ===
- Hospital of the Holy Sepulchre and Saint John, Pisa, est. 1113
- Ospedaletto in Verona, from 1154
- Ospedale dei Pellegrini, Asti, from 1182
- Hospital of San Sepolcro at the Ponte Vecchio, Florence, 1213–1808
- Abbey of Santissima Trinità, Venosa, after 1297
- Casa dei Cavalieri di Rodi in Rome, built in the late 13th century
- Hospital of San Giovanni a Maruggio, Brindisi, from 1300
- San Giovanni di Malta, Venice, transferred from the Templars in 1312
- Church of San Giovannino dei Cavalieri in Florence
- Ospedale dei Pellegrini, Naples, since 1564
- Ricetta di Malta, Augusta, Sicily, 17th–18th centuries

=== Iberian Peninsula ===
- Castle of La Muela, Spain, since 1183
- Royal Monastery of Santa María de Sigena, 1183–1936
- Igreja de Santa Luzia (Lisbon), Portugal, still owned by the Order
- Monastery of Flor da Rosa, Portugal, since 1340
- Town of Crato, Portugal, since 1232
- Monastery of Leça do Bailio (Matosinhos) Portugal, since 1112
- Castle of Amieira do Tejo, Portugal, since 1256
- Castle of Belver, Portugal, since 1194

=== Germany, Switzerland, Austria, Poland ===
- Mailberg Castle, Austria, since 1146
- Münchenbuchsee Commandery, Switzerland, since 1180
- Church of Saint John of Jerusalem outside the walls in Poznań, Poland, since 1187
- Ritterhaus Bubikon near Rapperswil, Switzerland, since the 1190s
- Thunstetten Commandery, Switzerland, since the early 13th century
- Maltese Church, Vienna, since 1217
- the Principality of Heitersheim in the Breisgau, 1262–1806, Imperial Estate from 1548
- Compesières Commandry near Geneva, Switzerland, since 1270
- Sonnenburg, now Słońsk in Poland, 1426–1945
- Ordenspalais in Berlin, 1738–1811
- Kastl Abbey, 1773–1803
- Biburg Abbey, 1781–1808
- Former Jesuit college and Church of Saint George in Amberg, Bavaria (1782–1808)

=== Great Britain and Ireland ===
==== Scotland ====
- Torphichen Preceptory, Scotland, since the 1140s

==== England ====
- St John's Jerusalem, Sutton-at-Hone, England, est. 1199
- Clerkenwell Priory in London, the Order's seat in England
- Knights Hospitaller Gallery, Quenington, England
- West Peckham Preceptory, England, since the early 15th century

==== Ireland ====
- Kilmainham Priory & Commandery, Dublin - the Order's former seat in Ireland was demolished and sited within the Royal Hospital Kilmainham campus
- Kilmainhamwood Preceptory, Co. Meath (named after the Priory)
- Kilmainhambeg Preceptory, Co. Meath (named after the Priory)
- Hospital Church in Hospital, County Limerick
- Church of St. John the Baptist, Johnstown, Co. Kildare
- Mainham, Co. Kildare
- Preceptories of Kilbegs, Kilheel and Tully, Co. Kildare
- Preceptory of Ardfinnan, Co. Tipperary
- Preceptory of Mourne, Co. Cork
- Preceptory of Kinelekin, Co. Galway
- Preceptory of Kilbarry, Co. Waterford
- Preceptory of St. John the Baptist in the Ards (founded by Hugh de Lacy)
- Preceptory of St. John & St. Brigid, Wexford (founded by William Marshall, Earl of Pembroke)
- Preceptory of Ballyheuk, Co. Wexford
- Johnstown, also known as Coorthafooka, Co. Kilkenny
- former Frankhouses and Liber Hospes in many towns in Ireland e.g. Mullingar and Fore, Co. Westmeath (sites not determined)

N.B. Other properties formerly of the Knights Templar came into the possession of the Knights Hospitaller after 1310.

== Tripoli and Malta ==
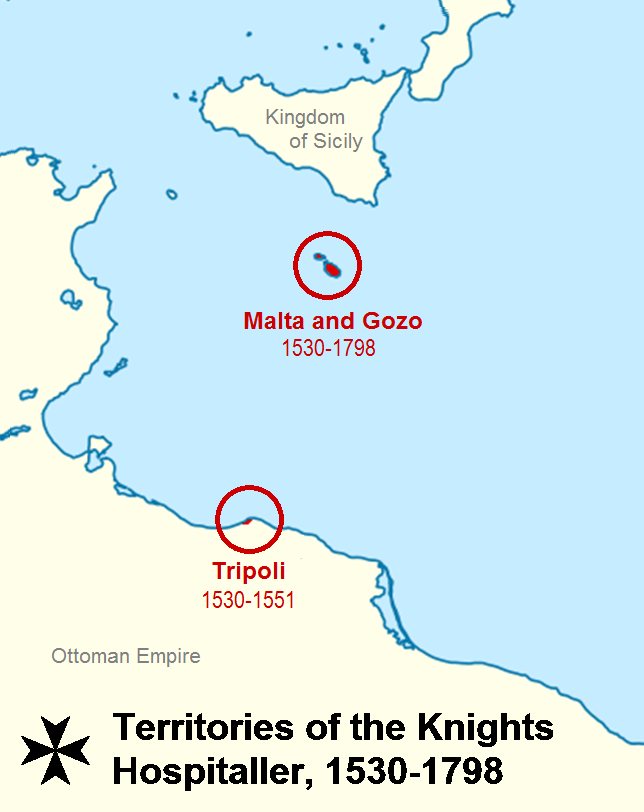

After the Ottoman conquest of Rhodes in 1522, the Knights made stops in Candia, Messina, Bacoli near Naples, and Civitavecchia. Pope Adrian VI provisionally relocated the Order in Viterbo, where they stayed from 1523 to 1527. Then at the invitation of Charles III, Duke of Savoy, they moved to Nice and nearby Villefranche. On 24 July 1530 in Bologna, Emperor Charles V granted them a new permanent base.

- Tripoli, 1530–1551, where the Hospitallers' church stood on the same location as the Sidi Darghut Mosque
- Malta and Gozo, 1530–1798

== Other locations ==
- Banate of Severin, 1247–1260
- Saint Barthélemy, Saint Kitts, Saint Croix and Northern Saint Martin, 1651–1665 during the Hospitaller colonization of the Americas

== Since 1798 ==
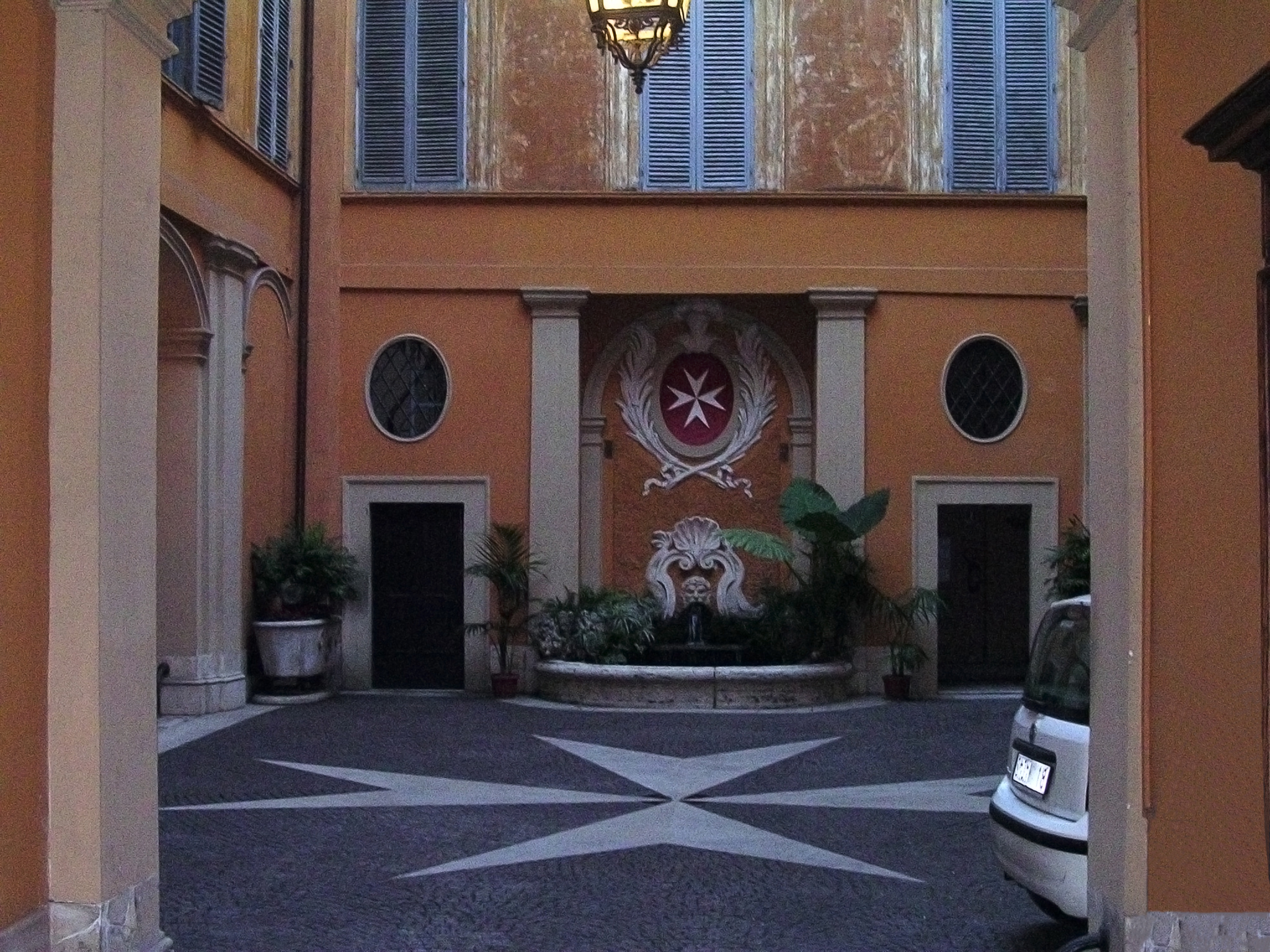
Palazzo Malta courtyard, Rome

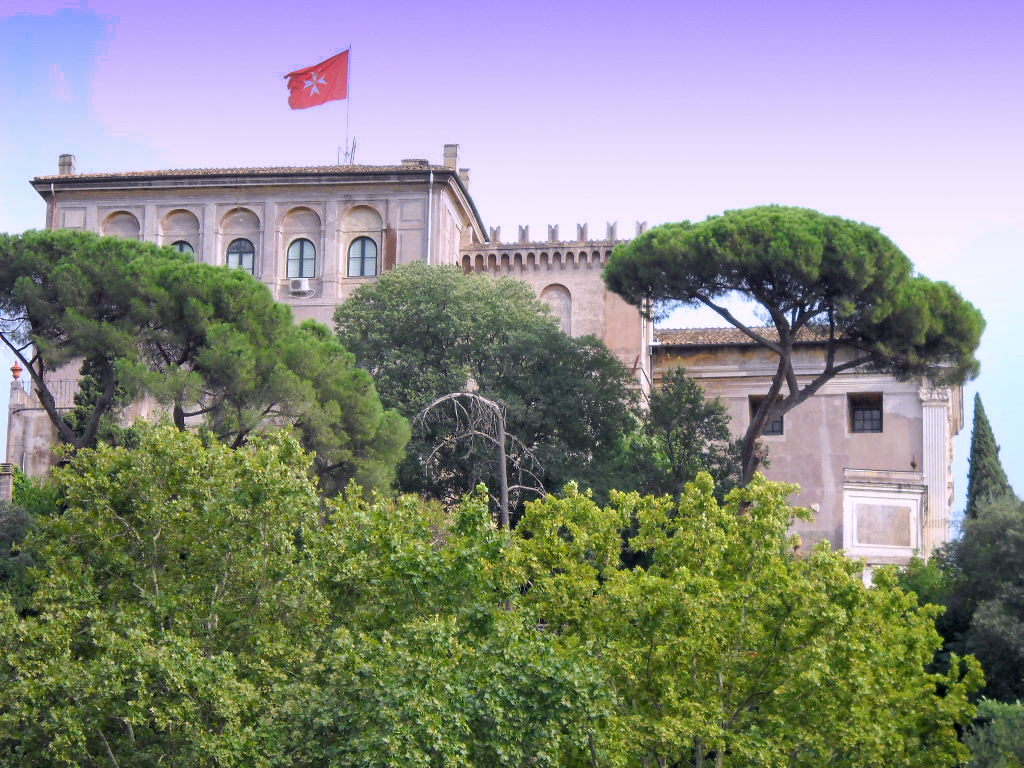
Magistral villa, Rome

Following the expulsion of the Order from Malta by Napoleon in 1798, the Order's remnants temporarily relocated in Messina until 1802, Catania until 1826, and Ferrara until 1834. Gotland was offered to the knights by Sweden in 1806, but they refused as they still hoped to reclaim sovereignty over Malta. The Order then settled in its long-held properties in Rome, which were granted extraterritoriality in 1869. In that period it assumed its modern name of Sovereign Military Order of Malta.

- Villa del Priorato di Malta, Rome, Templar property transferred in 1312, with the Santa Maria del Priorato Church
- Palazzo Malta, Rome, acquired in 1630
- Church of Saint Elizabeth of Hungary, Paris, since 1938
- Casa dei Cavalieri di Rodi, Rome, since 1946
- Villa Pagana in Rapallo, since 1959
- Saint John's Cavalier, part of the Fortifications of Valletta, leased since 1967 by the Order as its embassy in Malta
- Villa Malta (Cologne), since 1971
- Fort St. Angelo, Birgu, Malta (upper part), since 2001
- See also the list of diplomatic missions of the Sovereign Military Order of Malta

=== In Protestant countries ===
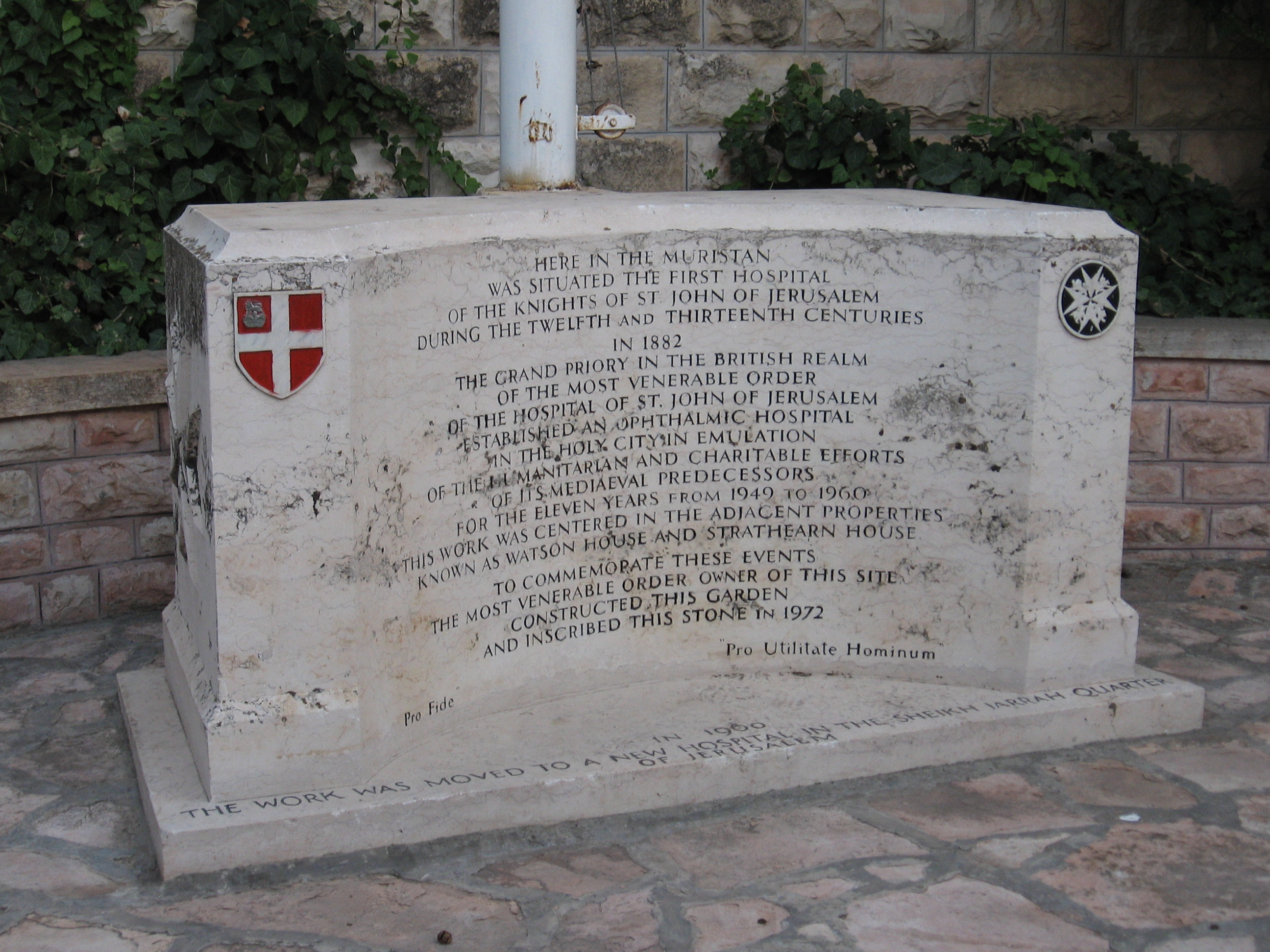
Memorial stone of the Order's original Hospital in Muristan, Jerusalem, erected in 1972 by the British Order of Saint John

The Order of Saint John (Bailiwick of Brandenburg) (Johanniter) had become autonomous in 1538, and was dissolved in 1811. Since restoration in 1852 it has had its seat in Berlin until World War II, then Bad Pyrmont until 1952, Rolandseck (Haus Sölling) until 1962, Bonn until 2001, Berlin-Lichterfelde until 2004, and since 2004 Potsdam as formal seat even though the main office remains in Lichterfelde. Its activities include the Johanniter-Unfall-Hilfe.

The British Order of Saint John, formed in 1831 and chartered in 1888, manages several facilities in Jerusalem under the Saint John Eye Hospital Group, as well as the international St John Ambulance network. Its London headquarters, at St John's Gate, Clerkenwell, hosts the Museum of the Order of St John.

The Order of Saint John in Sweden was founded in 1920 following the disruption of the Johanniter in Northern Europe during World War I. Its headquarters is hosted by the House of Nobility in Stockholm.

The Order of Saint John in the Netherlands was created in 1946 in a similar development following World War II. It is headquartered at 48 Lange Voorhout in The Hague.

Johanniter International, a partnership of the four Protestant Orders of St. John and their national charities, was founded in 2000 and is headquartered in Brussels.

== See also ==
- List of Knights Templar sites
- Ordensburg
- Commanderies of the Order of Saint John
