= Tibnin =

Town in Nabatieh Governorate, Lebanon

Tibnin تبنين
- Municipality
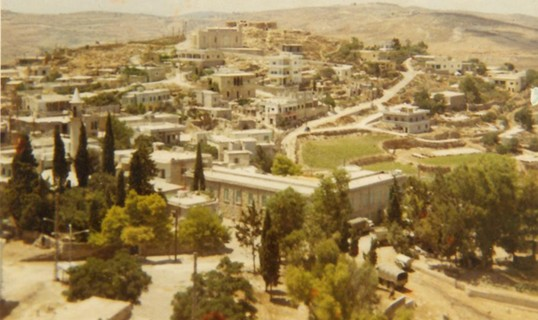
- Tibnin, seen from the Crusader's Toron Castle, 1969

- Location within Lebanon
- Coordinates: 33°11′36″N 35°24′39″E
- Grid position: 188/288 PAL
- Country: Lebanon
- Governorate: Nabatieh Governorate
- District: Bint Jbeil District
- Highest elevation: 800 m (2,600 ft)
- Lowest elevation: 700 m (2,300 ft)
- Time zone: UTC+2 (EET)
  - Summer (DST): UTC+3 (EEST)
- Dialing code: +961 (07)

Tibnin (Arabic: تبنين, romanized: Tibnīn, also romanized Tibnîn, Tebnine etc.) is a municipality spread across several hills (ranging in altitude from 700m to 800m (2,275 ft to 2,600 ft) above sea level) located about 25 km (16 mi) east of Tyre, in the heart of what is known as "Jabal Amel" or the mountain of "Amel". "Jabal Amel" designates the plateau situated on either side of the Litani river, a region strongly associated with its long-established Twelver Shia community.

== Etymology ==
The name "Tibnîn" is derived from a personal name.

== History ==
=== Prehistory ===
In 1966, Lorraine Copeland and Peter J. Wescombe published the discovery of prehistoric artifacts from two sites in Tibnin: Acheulean bifacial axes on the road from Tyre, which are preserved at The American University of Beirut, dated to the Lower Palaeolithic; and Stone Age megaliths from the road between Tebnin and Beit Yahum, records of them being preserved at the Institut de paléontologie humaine in Paris.

=== Classical antiquity ===
Adolphe Chauvet wrote in 1891 that the village history dates back to the Canaanites, but unfortunately did not cite a reference for this assertion.

Scholars have identified Tibnin as the town of Tafnis (תפניס) mentioned in the Jerusalem Talmud as a northern border of the kingdom of Judah.

=== Early Crusader period (1099–1187) ===
Frankish chronicler Guillaume de Tyr (William of Tyre) refers to the town as Tibénin (..nomen priscum Tibénin..).

Hugh of Fauquembergues, who participated in the First Crusade, built the castle of Toron in 1106 and died in a skirmish near Damascus. In early 1107, Izz al-Mulk, Sunni governor of Tyre, raided the village and massacred its inhabitants.

King Baldwin I of Jerusalem elected one of his knights whose first name was "Onfroi" or "Henfred" to be the new lord of Tebnine. Humphrey I of Toron started the dynasty at Tebnine in 1107; most of what we know of the man comes from chroniclers of the era who never mention his origin or last name. He took the name of the castle that he was entrusted with and his offspring all carried the surname "de Toron". It is not hard to guess the identity of Humphrey, as chroniclers only mention two knights with that name who participated in the First Crusade: "Humfroy de Montcayeux" and "Humfroy fils de Raoul".

The locals enjoyed a rather stable and semiautonomous life under Frankish rule as noted by Ibn Jubair in 1185: "The Muslim population between Tibnine and the coast enjoyed considerable rights of self-administration and enjoyment of their own customs."

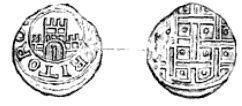
Toron coin

British historian Jonathan Riley-Smith mentions that the customs house below the castle levied no duty on merchants travelling with Ibn Jubair because they were travelling towards the port of Acre, and hence concluded that King Baldwin III's officials were stationed there, even though the fortress was not in his royal domain, which meant that Tibnin was an important stop on the roads between Tyre, Damascus and Jerusalem. The fertile land of Tibnin made it one of the granaries of the Crusader kingdom, and under Humphrey III of Toron (died 1173), the lordship had its own coinage, minted of red copper and stamped "CASTRI TORONI".

=== Late Crusader period (1187–1266) ===
==== Saladin's conquest and aftermath ====
After the Battle of Hattin in 1187, Saladin saw no threat of a Christian army in the foreseeable future and sent his nephew and most celebrated general, Al-Muzaffar Umar, north to besiege the castle of Toron for three days. Toron's garrison was cut off, weak, and unprepared with no leader as its lord Humphrey of Toron was captured at Hattin. Soon the Frankish nobles conceded the surrender of the castle, and Saladin allowed them five days to make a safe passage to Tyre with their fortunes and families. Muslim prisoners were freed and many of the crusaders were taken hostage.

al-Isfahani's description of the siege

Subsequently, Saladin asked his nephew to rebuild the castle and El-Seid tribesmen who were direct descendants of Muhammad and who were trusted confidantes to Saladin, allowed other tribesmen of Fawaz tribe, adepts of Sufism to live in the Land of Tibnine.

==== Crusade of 1197 ====
On 28 November 1197, while most of Syria expected the amalgamate of crusaders from the Duchy of Brabant, German forces, and knights of the king Amalric II of Jerusalem to head towards Jerusalem or Damascus, the crusaders laid siege to the castle of Tibnin to give Christian Tyre a breathing space. The siege was carried out with great energy and as the Christian forces managed to dig a small hole in the great walls of the castle, the Muslim garrison feared a fate like that of Maarat al-Numaan which was still fresh in the memory of Syrians, and offered to surrender. Despite the mild objections of the ruler of Tebnine (Husam El-Din Beshara), representatives of the families of Tebnin came down the hilly side of the castle to the Frankish camp and asked for safety (Al-Aman) in exchange for the liberation of 500 Christian slaves. Ibn al-Athir, the famous Arab historian, winks that a lot of the rumors circulating in Tebnine about what the crusaders would do if the castle was taken by assault, came from none other than other Frankish lords who were not very happy to see a successful campaign led by king Amalric II of Jerusalem, added to the fact that most of them had forged alliances with the sultan Al-Kamil of Egypt and were in no hurry to see it obliterated over some revolting massacres committed in Tebnin. The Germans would hear of no surrender. Tebnine promised pillage and fortune as well as glory to the knights who will return it to hand of the Christians. Chronicler Ernoul describes how the crusaders refused the Muslim offer and admits that it was a mistake not to accept the honorable offer of surrender. Their arrogance made them parade the messengers in front of the secret dig that the crusaders were working under the wall of the castle. Tebnin's garrison was more resolved to resist than ever. It was indeed the site of that dig that witnessed the fiercest fight that day. The warriors of Tebnine fought so ferociously that the dig was rendered useless, and the crusaders forced to retreat from their attack. The siege continued, and the besieged thought that another offer to capitulate, made from a stronger position, would yield a more positive outcome. Once more, representatives of Tebnine families carried the offer of surrender as long as their lives are spared, and once more the response was less than polite from the German chancellor. When the messengers were back in the castle, they informed the garrison of the insulting reception that they received from the Franks, and the will to fight was again strong. Towards the evening, carrier pigeons brought news of reinforcements on the way dispatched by the sultan Al-Kamil. In February 1198, under the threat of the looming Ayyubid army, and the war of succession in Germany between Philip of Swabia and Otto IV, Holy Roman Emperor, the German forces ended the siege of Tibnin when the Chancellor and his princes abandoned their men to their fate outside the gates of Toron, as described by Helmold von Bosau. And so, it was at the walls of Tibnine that the German crusade of 1197 ended in disgrace.

==== Sixth Crusade to Mamluk conquest (1229-1266) ====
In 1229, under the pressure of king Frederick II's Sixth Crusade, Egyptians sultan Al-Kamil who was Saladin's brother, returned the Seigneurie (lordship) of Toron (Tibnin) to the Franks. Ahmed Sheir says that the Teutonic Knights supported by Emperor Frederick II tried to add Toron ( Tibnin) to their possession being "a part of the possessions of Joscelin of Courtenay in 1120," that they had bought. However, the High Court of the Kingdom of Jerusalem forced Emperor Frederick II to admit the rights of Alice of Armenia, "being the niece of Humphrey IV and heiress of the fief of Tibnīn. "Accordingly, the rule of Humphrey I's dynasty at Tibnīn was restored by Alice in 1229. In the charter dated in November 1234, Alice of Tibnīn "Alis, princesses et dame de Toron", confirmed the donation of 30 bezants to the monastery of Saint-Lazare, which had been granted to this monastery by Humphrey II of Tibnīn in 1151. It is estimated that Alice ruled Tibnīn until 1239." This placed the lordship of Tibnin in the hands of the French baron Philip of Montfort, who arrived in Upper Galilee as one of the few knights to make it to the Holy Land in the aftermath of the Fourth Crusade, which had been initially launched under the leadership of Theobald of Champagne and had ended by conquering Constantinople. Montfort married Maria of Antioch-Armenia, the last remaining heiress to the Toron family, and seized the riches of Tibnin and its castle and imposed a tax on caravans using the spring beneath the castle. It was from Tibnin that Philip of Montfort would contemplate ways to seize Tyre from the hands of Richard Filangieri, who was the confidant of Frederick II.

==== Mamluk conquest and aftermath ====
After the conquest by the Mamluk Sultan Baibars in 1266, the Fawaz and Sayed families were entrusted with the defense of the land.

==== Crusader imprint on population? ====
Many of the existing families of Tibnin have a background makeup of Phoenician, European and Arab due to ranging influences in the region over centuries. Adolphe Chauvet noticed with surprise that a lot of the town folk in 1891 looked as blond as Germans, but gave no explanation for that: (Je suis surpris de voir passablement de blonds et de blondes, comme chez les Allemands. Le docteur Lortet a fait aussi, je crois, la mème remarque.) Early Irish troops in Tebnin made the same observation many years later. Crusader chronicler Foucher de Chartres (Fulcher of Chartres) gave a poignant explanation: "Nam qui fuimus occidentales, nunc facti sumus orientales", 'We who were Occidentals, became Orientals.'

=== Ottoman period ===
==== Early Ottoman period ====
In 1596, it was named as a village, Nafs Tibnin, in the Ottoman nahiya (subdistrict) of Tibnin under the liwa' (district) of Safad, with a population of 148 households and 13 bachelors, all Muslim. The villagers paid a taxes on cultural products, such as s wheat, barley, summer crops, fruit trees, goats and beehives, in addition to "occasional revenues"; a total of 8,900 akçe.

Between 1639 and 1649, Ali and Hussein 'al-Saghir' eliminated opposing Shiite families, namely the Shukrs, Munkars and Sa'abs, and established a single family rule over Jabal Amel's fortress towns of Hunin, Maarakeh, Qana, and Tibnine (commonly called Bilad Bishara = land of bishara). Their reign lasted until the tyrant Jezzar Pasha ascended to power in Acre in the eighteenth century, who with the aid of the obedient emir Bashir Shihab II, crushed 'al-Saghir's autonomous feudal system in the area and kicked their men out of Tibnine. However, in 1783, 'al-Saghir' clansmen and other, allied with emir Yusuf Shihab and ousted the forces of Jezzar Pasha from Tibnine, and reclaimed the castle as their home base, only to be betrayed by Yusuf Shihab and sent to Acre to be promptly executed.

==== Late Ottoman period ====
In the later days of the Ottoman Empire, Tibnin was the "Chef-Lieu" of "Bilad Bcharrah", or 'Land of Bisharah', where the Ottoman kaymakam took residence. This is how American traveller Rob Morris found the town in 1868. Morris describes the enchanting beauty of the town, and despite being certain that his credentials would ensure him being lodged in the castle by the pasha living there, he takes up residence with one of the families in the village, and mentions the tyranny with which the Ottoman troops treated the locals.

In 1875, Victor Guérin visited, and found there 600 Metualis and 250 Greek Catholics (united).

In 1881, the PEF's Survey of Western Palestine (SWP) described it as a "village, built of stone. The Mudir of the district resides in the castle. The inhabitants are about 450 (Guerin) says 600 Metawileh and 250 Christians. There is a Greco-Catholic chapel dedicated to Saint George in the village. It was located not far from the main street of the village (Zakouk) before it collapsed on the graves of the benefactors these Farhat brothers and the only priest of the village buried in the church to the left of the altar, he was from the Haddad family, after him his family adopted the patronymic Khoury. There are figs and arable land around. The water supply is from a large birket and twenty to twenty-five cisterns in and round the village."

=== French Mandate ===
After Lebanon was placed under the colonial power of the French, a southern rebel attempted to assassinate General Henri Gouraud. Adham Khanjar attempted to recruit followers in Tebnin and may have had some success initially due to the desire of some among the locals who wished unity with Syria. However, Adham Khanjar's sectarian views alienated the residents of Tebnin who always boasted an acceptance and coexistence between Christians and Moslems, and eventually rooted all support for Khanjar's band from the city. After Khanjar's capture, and the subsequent rebellion in Jabal al-Druze, members of the band of rebels that Adham Khanjar led, returned home only to be promptly arrested by the French authorities. In 1921, Under orders from Henri Gouraud, the occupying French forces in Lebanon responded to sectarian clashes in the south with a massive campaign targeting Shiite villagers. The military commanders demanded strict and draconian restitution from poor villagers who were not involved in the clashes to begin with. The spirit of revolt was being slowly stewing for some time and it came to a head when the collaborators with French set up a market in Tebnine to sell the goods that were confiscated from the surrounding villages. It was a cheap tactic that was employed by the French and their collaborators more than once. Tebnine was the seat of the "Saghir" dynasty from which the Feudal "Asa'ad" family claims descent; If Tebnine was made to appear appeasing the occupiers, it will make the "Asa'ad" family appear in cahoots with French and reflect badly on their standing among the Shiites in south Lebanon. This is also why no taxes were levied on Tebnine after the sectarian incidents of 1920. In 1922, French colonials divided the province of Saida and created the Bint Jubeil province which included Tebnin.

=== 20th century: new Greek-Catholic chapel ===
In the mid-20th century, following the collapse of the Greek-Catholic chapel described in the Late Ottoman period section, the inhabitants built a new chapel on the Tallet el Hosn hill, on land which juxtaposes the ruin of a small Crusader-time fort opposite Toron Castle. In the 1980s, the remains of the former parish priest were transferred to the same location in the new church and the remains of the Farhat brothers found a location to the right of the main entrance to the building.

=== Lebanese Civil War ===
Leading up to the civil war, like most of the surrounding area, the town was grounds to para-military actions carried out by the Palestine Liberation Organization (PLO): The Palestinian guerrilla fighters enjoyed widespread support after the 1967 war and for a short period past the 1968 Cairo accord, which granted the PLO free range in Southern Lebanon to carry out missions aimed at liberating Palestine. Tebnin remained mostly unaffected by sectarianism despite the co-existence of Muslims and Christians, and despite some of the Christians being aligned with right-wing militias, whilst the majority of the Shiite residents of the city sympathised with the PLO and the various Lebanese leftist groups aligned with the Palestinians. Support waned in the later years, as the PLO proved to be a corrupt and abusive force to the villagers.

In 1982, the Israeli invasion of south Lebanon wrecked the city, and the PLO were rooted out and never recovered the previous role. The Shiite residents of the town were mostly aligned with the Amal militia, whose leader Nabih Berri is a Tebnini.

At the end of the civil war, Amal handed over its heavy weapons to the National Lebanese Army and largely discontinued its resistance work against the occupying Israelis. This in turn allowed Hezbollah to dominate the residents' sympathies.

=== Israel-Lebanon conflict ===
==== 1978-1993 ====
In May 1978, the United Nations took over the security of South Lebanon by replacing the Lebanese Army. South Lebanon was in chaos in the wake of the first Israeli invasion aiming at pushing the PLO guerrillas behind the Litany River. The passing of UN security Council motion 425 established an interim UNIFIL force in the area. The Irish Battalion named the Tebnine army base Camp Shamrock, with a scorpion for its sigil as the land upon which the camp was constructed was rampant with the black scorpions of Tebnin with their venomous stings. For the most part, the UN were a welcome sight in Tebnin. The feeling of friendship grew between the locals and the Irish. Camp Shamrock was responsible for the building and partial maintenance of the Tebnine Orphanage.

After Operation Accountability, July 1993, in which dozens of Lebanese towns and villages were bombarded by the Israeli army and Tebnin was extensively damaged, the town's mukhtar called for the Lebanese army to be deployed in the area.

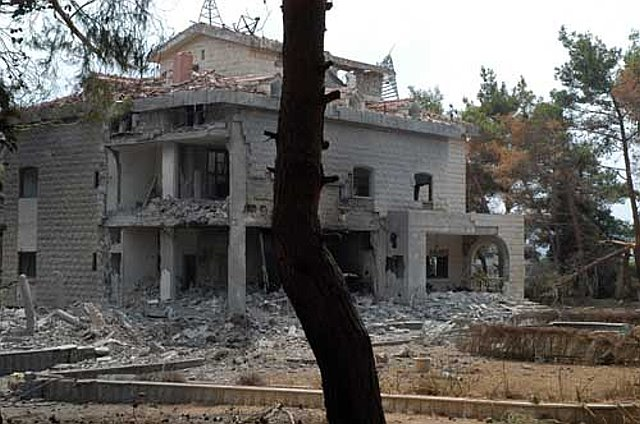
The home of the Tebnine mayor damaged during the war.

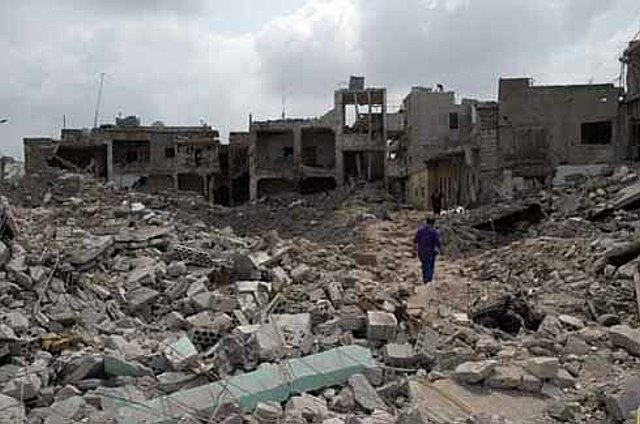
The old center (Zakouk)

==== 2006 Hezbollah-Israel war ====
During the war between Israel and Lebanon in July 2006, like other villages, Tebnin had many homes destroyed but not on the magnitude of villages like Bint Jbeil, Qana and Aita Shaab.

==== After 2006 ====
Near the government hospital there is a central hub for transportation in and out of the village. For the first time since the civil war in 1975, The Lebanese Army has returned to South Lebanon including Tibnin as one of the conditions of UN Resolution 1701.

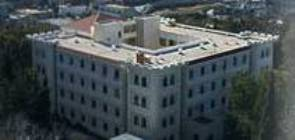
Tebnines Town Hall

==== 2024 Hezbollah-Israel war ====
On 3 November 2024, seven people were injured in an Israeli raid near the Tibnin Government Hospital.

== Climate ==
Tibnin enjoys a temperate climate which is characteristic of south Lebanon: Mild rainy winters and arid summers with a few excessively warm days. In recent years, due to the warming of the planet and deforestation, the amount of precipitation is noticeably reduced.

Climate data for Tebnine
Month	Jan	Feb	Mar	Apr	May	Jun	Jul	Aug	Sep	Oct	Nov	Dec	Year
Mean daily maximum °C (°F)	13.4 (56.1)	14.1 (57.4)	16.8 (62.2)	21.0 (69.8)	25.5 (77.9)	28.5 (83.3)	29.7 (85.5)	30.7 (87.3)	28.5 (83.3)	26.4 (79.5)	21.0 (69.8)	16.0 (60.8)	22.6 (72.7)
Daily mean °C (°F)	10.3 (50.5)	10.8 (51.4)	12.8 (55.0)	16.1 (61.0)	20.0 (68.0)	23.0 (73.4)	24.5 (76.1)	25.5 (77.9)	23.6 (74.5)	21.6 (70.9)	17.0 (62.6)	12.7 (54.9)	18.2 (64.7)
Mean daily minimum °C (°F)	7.3 (45.1)	7.6 (45.7)	8.8 (47.8)	11.2 (52.2)	14.6 (58.3)	17.6 (63.7)	19.3 (66.7)	20.3 (68.5)	18.8 (65.8)	16.8 (62.2)	13.0 (55.4)	9.4 (48.9)	13.7 (56.7)
Average precipitation mm (inches)	209 (8.2)	170 (6.7)	113 (4.4)	51 (2.0)	16 (0.6)	1 (0.0)	0 (0)	0 (0)	3 (0.1)	27 (1.1)	84 (3.3)	158 (6.2)	832 (32.6)

== Demographics ==
In 2014 Muslims made up 90.67% and Christians 8.96% of registered voters in Tibnin. 87.97% of the voters were Shiite Muslims and 7.63% were Greek Catholics.

The town's population are mostly Shiite Muslims, with a small minority of Greek Catholics. No exact population count has been taken since the census of 1932, however estimates show that the population could be around 5,000.

Many of Tibnin's natives live abroad primarily in the United States and Canada although many are scattered throughout the entire world.

During the 2006 Lebanon-Israel war, Tibnin had a record number of foreigners and returning nationals visit the village.

== Castle and events ==
=== Toron Castle of the Crusaders ===
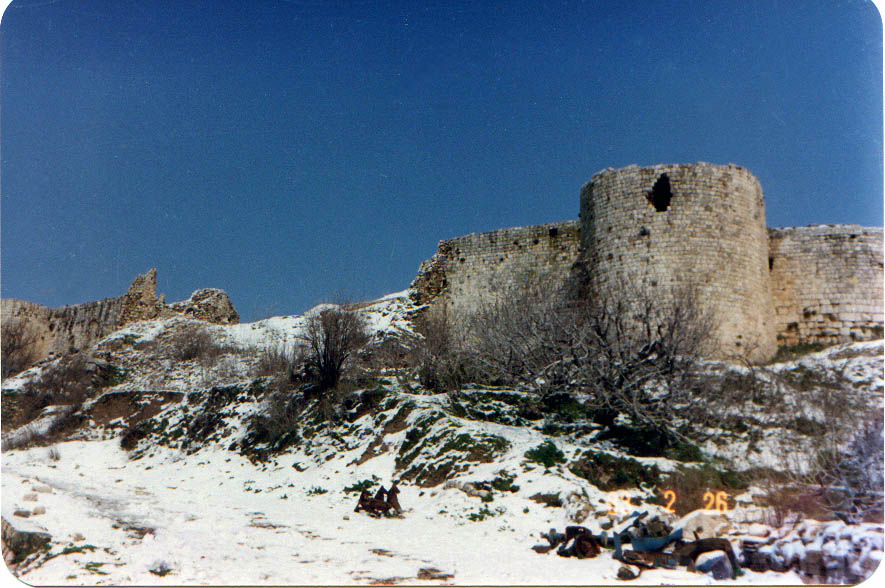
Toron Castle built by the Crusaders in Tebnine

Hugh of Fauquembergues, the second prince of Galilee and governor of Tiberias, organized many attacks against Tyre, but his forces were always tired by the long distance between his base in Tiberias and his coastal target. He ordered the construction of the castle in 1105 to have a refuge against his pursuers. It was named Toron, which in old French meant isolated or peaking hill. According to The Survey Of Western Palestine, Hugh was also responsible for the construction of the fortification found on a steep hill east of Tibnine, an area still called "Al Hosn" ('the fortress') to this day. Shortly after the death of Hugh, Tyre's garrison, under the command of its governor 'Izz al-Mulk', launched a sortie against the fortress and razed its surroundings. King Baldwin I of Jerusalem recaptured and rebuilt the castle and gave to Gervaise of Bazoches of Tiberias, but the new owner was shortly after captured by the forces of Damascus under the command of Zahir ad-Din Toghtekin, who made Gervaise choose between Islam and death. The seigneurie of Toron passed to a knight called 'Onfroi' who took the title of 'de Toron', (Humphrey I of Toron) and so began the story of one of the most prestigious crusader families of the kingdom of Jerusalem. Toron was then detached from the Principality of Galilee and made into an independent lordship, though some historians argue a later date for that detachment. The castle was later conquered by Saladin in 1187 and then taken back by the Franks in 1229. Mamluk sultan Al-Zahir Baibars of Egypt finally conquered it in 1266 after the fall of Safed.

==== After the Crusader period ====
After 1266, Toron Castle remained in Arab hands until the Ottomans turned it into a jail.

The Crusader castle has been used by many different factions and armies over the years because of its strategic position overlooking miles of terrain.

The castle has been confused with other castles in the country, e.g. Beaufort Castle, but it is originally the Toron des chevaliers. Today it is mostly referred to as "the Tebnine Castle". In November 2024 UNESCO granted the castle and 33 other heritage sites in Lebanon enhanced protection due to Israel's invasion; however, the castle sustained damage during the conflict and one of its medieval walls collapsed.

==== Marble lions ====
As late as 1921, two marble lions guarded the main entrance to the castle. The chained beasts are a source of mystery for their presence can not be dated or traced back to any of the various factions that ruled the city. The lions are missing nowadays, most likely carried off and sold by the locals.

=== Tibnin Heritage Festival ===
In 2012, funding from the EU allowed Tibnin to celebrate its Heritage Festival in the old castle, where lighting had been refurbished by the French troops of UNIFIL.

With its historic castle and South Lebanon's history of occupiers and conquerors that include Alexander the Great, Tibnin has the potential to be a tourist attraction.

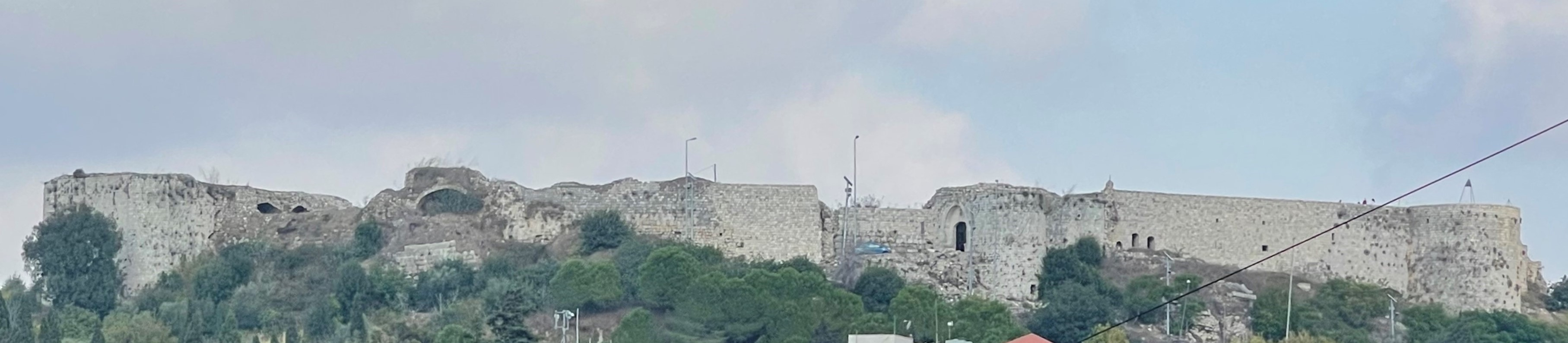
View of Toron des Chevaliers in Tibnin from the western quarter of the village..

=== Other attractions and institutions ===
Tibnin is also known for the Kazdoura (promenade), a long stretch of road that extends from the beginning to the end of the village. It also hosts a weekly flea market called the Souq al-jumaa (Friday's market).

Tibnin has several provincial institutions such as a governmental hospital, a police station, post office as well as touristic sites such as cafes and commercial shops.

== Notable people ==
- Nabih Berri (born 1938), as of 2024 speaker of the Lebanese Parliament and leader of the Amal Movement
- Hameed Dakroub, member of the Lebanese Parliament elected in 1972 (details here)
- Zaynab Fawwaz (1860-1912), women's rights activist and writer

== See also ==
- Tebnin SC

== Bibliography ==
- Besson, Florian (2017). Les barons de la chrétienté orientale : Pratiques du pouvoir et cultures politiques en Orient latin (1097-1229) (doctorate in history thesis) (in French). Paris: Paris-Sorbonne University - Paris IV. pp. 77 (note 74), 397. Quote: Fief of Tibnin (Toron); Tibnīn.
- Conder, C.R.; Kitchener, H.H. (1881). The Survey of Western Palestine: Memoirs of the Topography, Orography, Hydrography, and Archaeology. Vol. 1. London: Committee of the Palestine Exploration Fund. (pp. 116, 133-5, 207-8). Quote: Tibnin, Hosn Tibnin, Kūlat Tibnin, Kul'at Tibnin.
- Guérin, V. (1880). Description Géographique Historique et Archéologique de la Palestine (in French). Vol. 3: Galilee, pt. 2. Paris: L'Imprimerie Nationale. p. 378. Quote: Tibnin.
- Humphreys, R.S. (1977). From Saladin to the Mongols: The Ayyubids of Damascus, 1193-1260. New York: SUNY press. ISBN 0-87395-263-4. Quote: Tibnin.
- Hütteroth, W.-D.; Abdulfattah, K. (1977). Historical Geography of Palestine, Transjordan and Southern Syria in the Late 16th Century. Erlanger Geographische Arbeiten, Sonderband 5. Erlangen, Germany: Vorstand der Fränkischen Geographischen Gesellschaft. ISBN 3-920405-41-2. Quote: Tibnīn.
- Ibn Jubayr (1884). "Extrait du Voyage d'Ibn Djobeir". Recueil des historiens des croisades (in French). 3: 447. Quote: Tibnîn.
- Le Strange, G. (1890). Palestine Under the Moslems: A Description of Syria and the Holy Land from A.D. 650 to 1500. Committee of the Palestine Exploration Fund. Quote: Tibnin; Jabal Tibnin; Tibnin (Le Toron).
- Morris, R. (1876). Freemasonry in the Joly Land : or, Handmarks of Hiram's Builders. Chicago: Knight & Leonard. Quote: Tibnin.
- Palmer, E.H. (1881). The Survey of Western Palestine: Arabic and English Name Lists Collected During the Survey by Lieutenants Conder and Kitchener, R. E. Transliterated and Explained by E.H. Palmer. Committee of the Palestine Exploration Fund. Quote: Tibnîn, Kŭlàt Tibnîn.
- Pringle, D. (1997). "Tibnin". Secular buildings in the Crusader Kingdom of Jerusalem: an archaeological Gazetteer. Cambridge University Press. ISBN 0521-46010-7. (p. 102)
- Pringle, D. (1998). "Tibnin". The Churches of the Crusader Kingdom of Jerusalem: L-Z (excluding Tyre). Vol. II. Cambridge University Press. p. 367. ISBN 0-521-39037-0.
- Rhode, H. (1979). Administration and Population of the Sancak of Safed in the Sixteenth Century. Columbia University. Archived from the original on 1 March 2020.
- Riley-Smith, J. (1973). The Feudal Nobility and the Kingdom of Jerusalem 1174 - 1277. London: The Macmillan Press Ltd. ISBN 0-208-01348-2.
- Robinson, E.; Smith, E. (1841). Biblical Researches in Palestine, Mount Sinai and Arabia Petraea: A Journal of Travels in the year 1838. Vol. 3. Boston: Crocker & Brewster. (pp. 377-380). Quote: Tibnîn.
- Röhricht, R. (1893). (RRH) Regesta regni Hierosolymitani (MXCVII-MCCXCI) (in Latin). Berlin: Libraria Academica Wageriana.
- Smail, R.C (1995). Crusading Warfare, (1097-1193). 200 Easton rd, London: Cambridge University Press. ISBN 0521458382.
- Strehlke, E., ed. (1869). Tabulae Ordinis Theutonici ex tabularii regii Berolinensis codice potissimum. Berlin: Weidmanns.
- Winter, S. (2010). The Shiites of Lebanon under Ottoman Rule, 1516-1788. London: Cambridge University Press. ISBN 978-0521765848. Quote: Tibnin.
