= Humphrey II of Toron =

Noble of Jerusalem (1117–1179)

Humphrey II of Toron (1117 – 22 April 1179) was lord of Toron and constable of the Kingdom of Jerusalem. He was the son of Humphrey I of Toron.

== Biography ==
Humphrey had become lord of Toron sometime before 1140 when he married the daughter of Renier Brus, lord of Banias (the Herodian city of Caesarea Philippi). Through this marriage, Banias was added to Toron. Humphrey became castellan of Hebron in 1149 when Hebron became a domain of the royal family of Jerusalem. In 1153 he became constable of Jerusalem when King Baldwin III became sole ruler after a struggle with his mother Queen Melisende. That year he was present with the king at the Siege of Ascalon.

Humphrey was defeated by Nur ad-Din at Banias in 1157 and was besieged in its castle until Baldwin III arrived to lift the siege. That year Humphrey also sold Banias and Chastel Neuf to the Knights Hospitaller (Chastel Neuf was captured by Nur ad-Din in 1167). Also in 1157 he helped negotiate the marriage of Baldwin III and Theodora, niece of the Byzantine emperor Manuel I Comnenus. Humphrey himself later married Philippa, sister of Bohemund III of Antioch, who had previously had an affair with future Byzantine emperor Andronicus I Comnenus, Manuel's cousin. Humphrey had been married before, to an unknown woman, and his marriage with Philippa produced no children.

In 1173 Humphrey relieved Nur ad-Din's siege of Kerak in Oultrejordain. In 1176 his importance at the royal court was somewhat lessened due to the influence of Agnes of Courtenay, but he kept his position as constable. In 1177 this lessened importance was manifested when the lordship of Hebron was recreated and given to Raynald of Châtillon, lord of Oultrejordain, rather than Humphrey, who was still castellan. Nevertheless, he was one of the supporters of the Raymond III of Tripoli, regent for Baldwin IV. Raymond, Humphrey, and others represented the faction of old families at court, who were opposed to newcomers like Raynald, and later Guy of Lusignan.

Humphrey rebuilt Chateau Neuf in 1179 after it had been destroyed in various sieges. Also in 1179, he helped negotiate a truce between the Knights Hospitaller and Knights Templar. Later that year he accompanied Baldwin IV in an attack on a small Muslim force near Banias, but, although he saved Baldwin IV's life, he suffered mortal wounds and died at his castle at Hunin on 22 April. He was succeeded in Toron by his 13-year-old grandson Humphrey IV, son of Humphrey III and Stephanie of Milly; Humphrey III of Toron was his son by his unknown first wife.

Preceded by Humphrey I	Lord of Toron c. 1140–1179	Succeeded by Humphrey IV
