= Hugh of Fauquembergues =

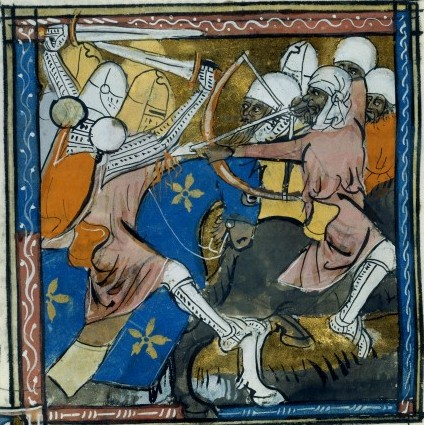
Death of Hugh

Hugh of Fauquembergues, also known as Hugh of St Omer, Hugh of Falkenberg, or Hugh of Falchenberg (Latin: Hugo de Falchenberch; died in 1105 or 1106) was Prince of Galilee from 1101 to his death. He was Lord of Fauquembergues before joining the First Crusade. Baldwin I of Jerusalem granted him Galilee after its first prince, Tancred, who was Baldwin's opponent, had voluntarily renounced it. Hugh assisted Baldwin against the Fatimids and made raids into Seljuk territories. He established the castles of Toron and Chastel Neuf (at present-day Tebnine and Hunin, respectively). He died fighting against Toghtekin, Atabeg of Damascus.

== Early life ==
Hugh's parentage is unknown, but William of Tyre called him "Hugo de Sancto Aldemaro", suggesting that he was descended from the powerful family of the hereditary castellans of Saint-Omer. He was the lord of the nearby Fauquembergues. A contemporary poem written by an unknown author listed Hugh among the first crusaders from the Diocese of Thérouanne. Though no primary sources recorded in whose retinue he reached the Holy Land, it is thought that he accompanied either Baldwin of Boulogne or Robert II of Flanders. Baldwin and his elder brother, Godfrey of Bouillon, Duke of Lower Lorraine, departed for the crusade on 15 August 1096, and Robert II of Flanders about a month later.

After Baldwin seized Edessa on 9 March 1098, Hugh settled in the county that developed around the town. He was one of Baldwin's most trusted retainers. After Godfrey of Bouillon, who had become the ruler of Jerusalem, died on 18 July 1100, Baldwin sent Hugh to Jerusalem to secure his claim to Godfrey's inheritance. Hugh and Robert, Bishop of Lydda and Ramla took control of the Tower of David, enabling Baldwin to enter Jerusalem on 9 November.

Baldwin was crowned king on 25 December 1100. Tancred, Prince of Galilee, did not recognize Baldwin as king, but their conflict was soon resolved. Noblemen came from the Principality of Antioch and asked Tancred to assume the administration of the principality on behalf of his relative, Bohemond I of Antioch, who had been captured by Turkish troops. Tancred accepted the offer and renounced Galilee in March 1101, but he also stipulated that the king should grant the same land "as a fief" to him if he returned to the kingdom within fifteen months.

== Prince of Galilee ==
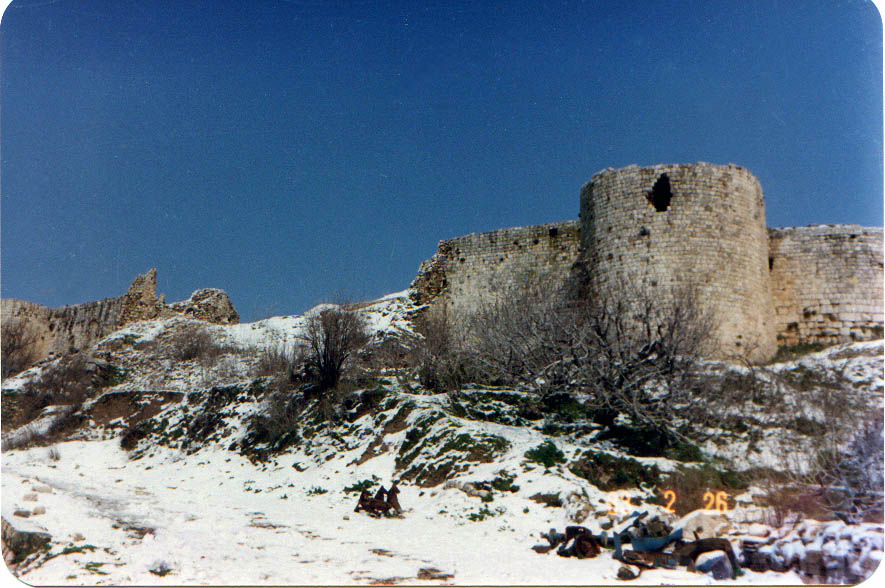
The fortress at Toron, which was built by Hugh

King Baldwin divided Tancred's large fief in two, granting Tiberias and its region to Hugh, but giving Haifa to Geldemar Carpenel, who had already claimed it from Tancred. An Egyptian army invaded the Kingdom of Jerusalem from the south in early September 1101. The king decided to attack the invaders near Ramla at dawn on 7 September. He divided his troops into five corps, appointing Hugh to command the third corps. The Egyptians annihilated the first two corps of the crusader army and also defeated Hugh and his troops. Thinking that the battle was lost, Hugh fled from the battlefield and hurried to Jaffa to inform the queen, traditionally called Arda, about the catastrophe. However, the battle was not lost, because the king made a surprise attack against the Egyptians and defeated them.

The Egyptians launched a new invasion against the kingdom in May 1102. Hugh and his 80 knights hurried from Galilee to assist the royal army, but by the time they reached Arsuf on 19 May, the Egyptians had defeated the crusaders at Ramla. At Arsuf, they met the king who had escaped before the battle to muster new troops. The Egyptians laid siege to Jaffa where the queen was staying. The king sailed from Arsuf to Jaffa on the ship of an English adventurer, while Hugh and his troops rode on the coastline. The Egyptians could not prevent the king from entering the town, and he helped Hugh and retainers to also break through the Egyptian troops around Jaffa. The arrival of hundreds of English, French, and Italian pilgrims enabled Baldwin to make a counter-attack, forcing the Egyptians to lift the siege on 27 May.

Hugh pursued an aggressive policy against the Muslim rulers. He ordered the erection of the fortresses of Toron and Chastel Neuf to control the road between Damascus and Tyre. The two castles were finished in the autumn of 1105. Before long, Hugh made a plundering raid against the territories over Chastel Neuf. When he was returning to Galilee, taking much booty with him, Toghtekin, Atabeg of Damascus, ambushed him. During the skirmish, an arrow killed Hugh, and Toghtekin soon captured Chastel Neuf. Hugh's brother, Gerard, did not long survive him. Hugh fathered two daughters, according to the Lignages d'Outremer, but Galilee was granted to Gervase of Bazoches, a knight from Northern France. Hugh was buried in Nazareth.

== Sources ==
- Asbridge, Thomas (2012). The Crusades: The War for the Holy Land. Simon and Schuster. ISBN 978-1-84983-688-3.
- Barber, Malcolm (2012). The Crusader States. Yale University Press. ISBN 978-0-300-11312-9.
- Fink, Harold S. (1969) [1955]. "The Foundation of the Latin States, 1118–1144". In Setton, Kenneth M.; Baldwin, Marshall W. (eds.). A History of the Crusades, Volume I: The First Hundred Years. Vol. 1 (Second ed.). Madison, Milwaukee, and London: University of Wisconsin Press. pp. 368–409. ISBN 0-299-04844-6.
- Lock, Peter (2006). The Routledge Companion to the Crusades. Routledge. ISBN 9-78-0-415-39312-6.
- Mayer, Hans Eberhard (1994). "The crusader principality of Galilee between Saint-Omer and Bures-sur-Yvette". In Gyselen, R. (ed.). Itinéraires d'Orient: Hommages à Claude Cahen. Groupe pour l'Étude de la Civilisation du Moyen-orient. pp. 157–167. ISBN 978-2-9508266-0-2.
- Murray, Alan V. (2000). The Crusader Kingdom of Jerusalem: A Dynastic History, 1099–1125. Prosopographica et Geneologica. ISBN 978-1-9009-3403-9.
- Piana, Mathias (2015). "Crusader fortifications: between tradition and innovation". In Boas, Adrian (ed.). The Crusader World. Routledge. pp. 437–459. ISBN 978-0-415-82494-1.
- Richard, Jean (1999). The Crusades, c. 1071–c. 1291. Cambridge University Press. ISBN 0-521-62369-3.
- Runciman, Steven (1989) [1952]. A History of the Crusades, Volume II: The Kingdom of Jerusalem and the Frankish East. Vol. 2. Cambridge: Cambridge University Press. ISBN 0-521-06163-6.
- Tanner, Heather J. (2003). "In His Brother's Shadow: The Crusading Career and Reputation of Eustace III of Boulogne". In Semaan, Khalil I. (ed.). The Crusades: Other Experiences, Alternate Perspectives: Selected Proceedings from the 32nd Annual CEMERS Conference. Global Academic Publishing. pp. 83–100. ISBN 1-58684-251-X.

Hugh of Fauquembergues House of Saint-Omer Died: 1105/1106
Preceded by Tancred	Prince of Galilee; 1101–1105/1106	Succeeded by Gervase of Bazoches
