= Sa'b family =

Lebanese noble Shia Muslim family

The Sa'b family is a prominent Shia Muslim family in Lebanon.

== History ==
The Sa'bs were of Kurdish tribal origin and during the Ottoman era became a leading family (zu'ama) among the Shia Muslims of the Jabal Amil area of modern southern Lebanon. The likely progenitor of the Sa'b family was Ahmad Abu Sa'b, who is mentioned in an Ottoman tax register from 1571 as the holder of the timar (fief) of Shaqif Arnun (Beaufort Castle) in the Jabal Amil area of Safad Sanjak. The Sa'bs were originally headquartered in the Shaqif Arnun castle. In 1582 he was accused by the government of joining the rebel chief of the Druze Ma'n dynasty of the Chouf, Qurqumaz Ma'n, in raiding the Safad region. The Sa'bs lost the Shaqif Arnun tax farm and castle to the Ma'ns in the 1600s under their prominent chief Fakhr al-Din II. Later in the century, they regained control of Shaqif Arnun and participated in the Shia victory against Fakhr al-Din's grandnephew Ahmad Ma'n at Nabatieh in 1666.

The Sa'b family continued to be mentioned in the local narrative sources throughout the 18th century, mainly as holders of the tax farm of Bilad Bishara (Tibnin-Hunin-Qana triangle), usually in concert with other leading Shia clans, such as the Ali al-Saghirs and Munkars. A certain Sulayman Sa'b is mentioned in a government document as having been expelled from Bilad Bishara. The Sa'bs were crushed alongside the Munkars by the Shihab dynasty of Mount Lebanon in a battle near Nabatieh in 1707. They later allied with the Shihabs and the governor of Sidon Eyalet, As'ad Pasha al-Azm, against the Ali al-Saghirs, defeating the latter at Yaroun in 1732. The Sa'bs and a wider Shia coalition were routed by the Shihabs in the village of Ansar in 1743 after the Sa'bs' failure to remit taxes to Sidon.

== Bibliography ==
- Winter, Stefan (2010). The Shiites of Lebanon under Ottoman Rule, 1516–1788. Cambridge: Cambridge University Press. ISBN 978-0-521-76584-8.
