= Humphrey IV of Toron =

Baron in the Kingdom of Jerusalem (died 1198)

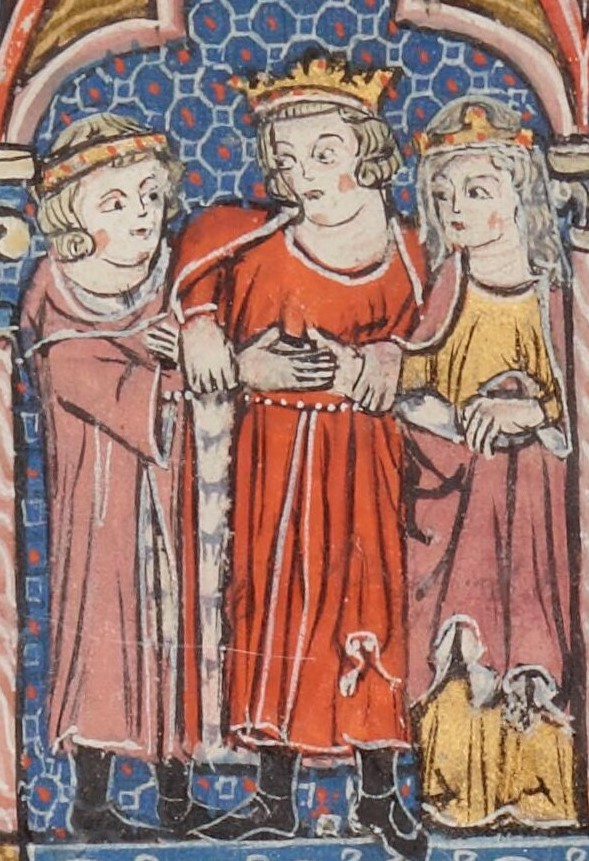
- Marriage of Humphrey and Isabella of Jerusalem

Lord of Toron
- Reign: 1179–1180
- Predecessor: Humphrey II of Toron
- Successor: Acquired by the Crown
- Born: c. 1165
- Died: 1198
- Noble family: Toron
- Spouse: Isabella of Jerusalem (m. 1183; ann. 1190)
- Father: Humphrey III of Toron
- Mother: Stephanie of Milly

Humphrey IV of Toron (c. 1165 – 1198) was a leading baron in the Kingdom of Jerusalem. He inherited the Lordship of Toron from his grandfather, Humphrey II, in 1179. He was also heir to the Lordship of Transjordan through his mother, Stephanie of Milly. In 1180, he yielded Toron to King Baldwin IV of Jerusalem on his engagement to the king's half-sister, Isabella. Humphrey married Isabella in Kerak Castle in autumn 1183. Saladin, the Ayyubid sultan of Egypt and Syria, laid siege to Kerak during the wedding, but King Baldwin IV and Count Raymond III of Tripoli relieved the fortress.

Baldwin IV made his young nephew, Baldwin V, his successor before his death, but Baldwin V also died in the summer of 1186. The barons, who did not want to acknowledge the right of Baldwin V's mother, Sybilla, and her husband, Guy of Lusignan, to inherit the kingdom, decided to proclaim Humphrey and Isabella king and queen. However, Humphrey did not want to reign and did homage to Sybilla and Guy. He was captured in 1187 at the Battle of Hattin, where Saladin imposed a crushing defeat on the united army of the Kingdom of Jerusalem. Humphrey's mother, Stephanie, offered the surrender of the fortresses of Oultrejordain to Saladin in exchange for her son's release. Although the garrisons of Kerak and Montréal refused to surrender, Saladin set Humphrey free. Kerak only fell to Saladin's troops in late 1188, Montréal in early 1189.

After Queen Sybilla died in 1190, most barons of the realm (including Isabella's stepfather, Balian of Ibelin) wanted to give Isabella in marriage to Conrad of Montferrat, a successful military leader. The marriage of Humphrey and Isabella was annulled, although they protested the decision. Humphrey joined the retinue of King Richard I of England during his crusade in 1191–1192. Since Humphrey was fluent in Arabic, he conducted negotiations with Saladin's brother, Al-Adil, on Richard's behalf. He died in 1198.

== Early life ==
Humphrey was born in about 1165, the son of Humphrey, heir to Humphrey II of Toron, and Stephanie of Milly. Humphrey was a child when his father died around 1173. His mother soon inherited the Lordship of Transjordan. She married Miles of Plancy, seneschal of Jerusalem, who was murdered in October 1174. The following year she married Raynald of Châtillon. Humphrey inherited the Lordship of Toron from his grandfather who died of wounds received at the Battle of Banyas on 22 April 1179.

King Baldwin IV of Jerusalem's eight-year-old half-sister, Isabella, was betrothed to Humphrey in October 1180. His and Isabella's respective stepfathers, Raynald of Châtillon and Balian of Ibelin, were prominent figures of the two groups of barons in the Kingdom of Jerusalem. The two baronial groups had been competing for the control of state administration, because King Baldwin suffered from leprosy and could not rule alone. According to the marriage contract, Humphrey yielded his inherited domains (Toron, Banias and Chastel Neuf) to Baldwin in exchange for a money fief of 7,000 bezants. This provision of the marriage contract suggests that Baldwin wanted to prevent Humphrey from uniting two large fiefs, Toron and Transjordan. Baldwin granted Toron or its usufruct to his mother, Agnes of Courtenay, around 1183.

Saladin, who had united Egypt and Syria under his rule, invaded the Kingdom of Jerusalem in September 1183. Humphrey commanded the forces of Oultrejourdain, dispatched by Raynald of Châtillon to join the united army of the kingdom. Saladin's soldiers ambushed and almost annihilated his troops at Mount Gilboa. Saladin's campaign ended with his withdrawal on 7 October, because he could not persuade the main army to join battle.

== Marriage ==
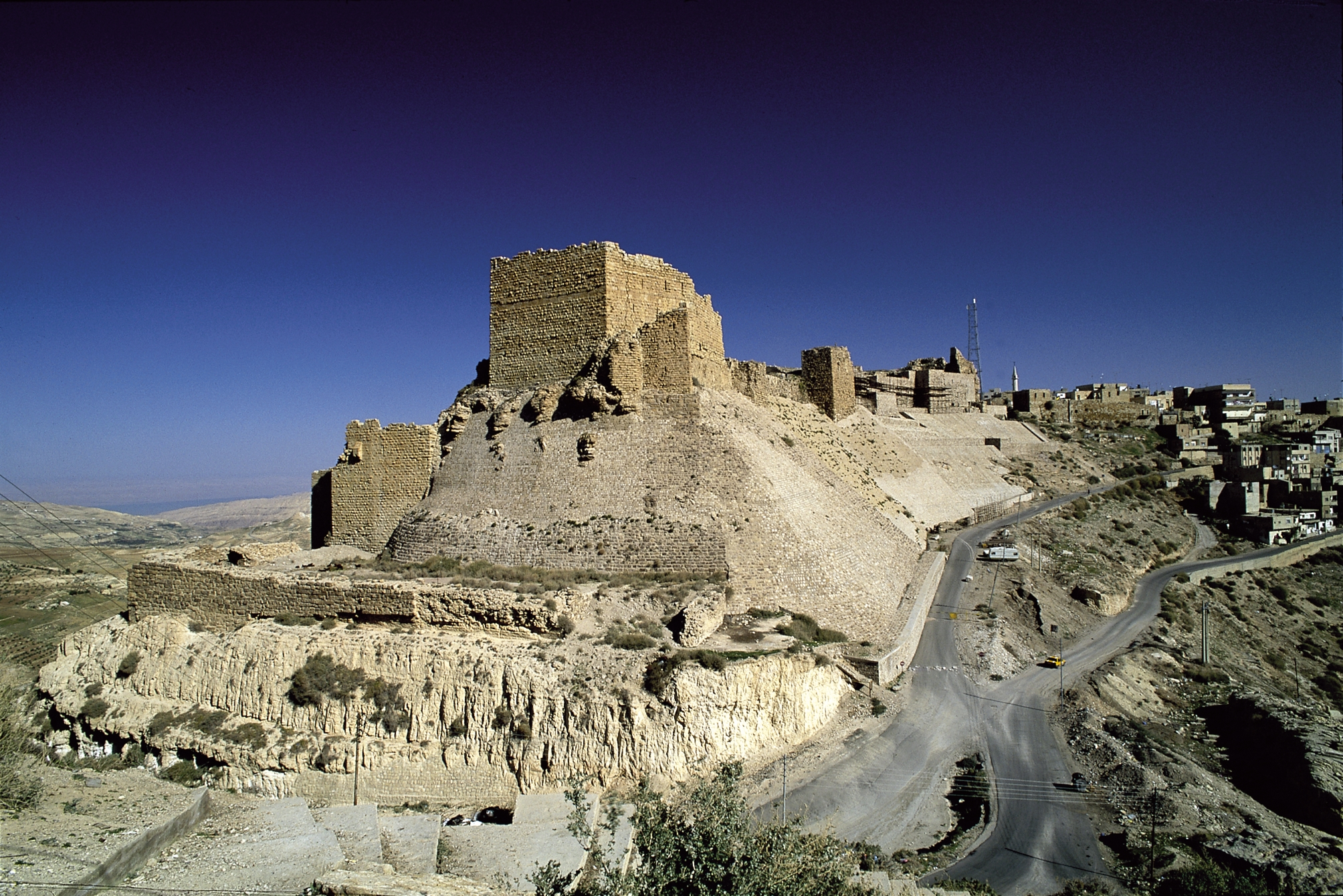
Kerak Castle (at present-day Al-Karak in Jordan)

Humphrey married Isabella in Kerak Castle in the autumn of 1183. During the wedding, Saladin laid siege to the fortress to take revenge for Raynald of Châtillon's plundering raid on the Red Sea in February. According to a version of Ernoul's chronicle, Humphrey's mother, Stephanie, convinced Saladin not to bombard the tower in which the newly married young couple were lodged, although he continued to besiege the rest of the fortress. King Baldwin and Raymond III of Tripoli eventually relieved Kerak on 4 December.

The dying Baldwin IV, who had disinherited his sister Sybilla and her husband Guy of Lusignan in favor of her six-year-old son, Baldwin V, in March 1183, nominated Raymond of Tripoli regent to his successor. The High Court of Jerusalem also decreed that if Baldwin V died, the pope, the Holy Roman emperor, and the kings of France and England were to decide whether Sybilla or Isabella was entitled to succeed him. Baldwin IV died in March 1185, Baldwin V the next summer.

== Unwilling claimant ==
Sybilla's maternal uncle, Joscelin III of Courtenay, persuaded Raymond of Tripoli to leave Jerusalem to hold an assembly in Tiberias for the barons of the realm. After Raymond departed to Tiberias, Joscelin invited Sybilla and Guy to Jerusalem. As soon as Raymond realized that Joscelin had deceived him, he summoned the High Court to Nablus. All the barons of the realm (including Humphrey) hurried to Nablus, except Humphrey's stepfather, Raynald of Châtillon, who went to Jerusalem. The barons sent messengers to Jerusalem to remind Sybilla, Guy, and their supporters of the High Court's decision on the matter of the succession. Ignoring their messages, Heraclius, Latin Patriarch of Jerusalem, crowned Sybilla queen, and she in turn placed the crown on her husband's head. Before long, acting on Raymond of Tripoli's proposal, the barons at Nablus decided to proclaim Isabella and Humphrey queen and king against Sybilla and Guy.

Raymond and his supporters were willing to march against Jerusalem, but Humphrey had no desire for the crown. He secretly left Nablus during the night and rode to Jerusalem to meet Sybilla. She refused him initially, but after Humphrey told her of his intention, she accompanied him to her husband. Humphrey swore fealty to Guy, putting an end to the conspiracy for Humphrey's and Isabella's coronation. All the barons except Raymond of Tripoli and Baldwin of Ramleh hurried to Jerusalem to do homage to Sybilla and Guy. Guy granted Toron and Chastel Neuf (two domains that Humphrey had abandoned in 1180) to Joscelin of Courtenay in 1186, stipulating that should he restore the two estates to Humphrey, he would receive the compensation that Humphrey had received for them.

== Battle of Hattin ==
Raynald of Châtillon plundered a caravan moving from Egypt to Syria in early 1187, claiming that the truce between the Kingdom of Jerusalem and Saladin did not cover his Lordship of Transjordan. After King Guy failed to persuade Raynald to pay compensation, Saladin proclaimed a jihad (holy war) against the Kingdom of Jerusalem. Saladin's army crushed the united forces of the kingdom in the Battle of Hattin on 4 July 1187.

Humphrey also participated in the battle. He was captured on the battlefield like most of the commanders of the Christian army. With the exception of Raynald (whom he personally beheaded) and the knights of the Military Orders (who were massacred by fanatics), Saladin spared their lives. Saladin sent his prisoners to Damascus and conquered the Christian towns and fortresses one after another.

Two castles in Oultrejordan – Kerak and Montréal – were among the few fortresses that resisted. In October, Stephanie of Milly promised to persuade the garrisons at the two fortresses to surrender if Saladin released her son. Saladin accepted her offer and allowed Humphrey to join her. However, the defenders refused to surrender and Humphrey returned to Damascus. Before long, Saladin set Humphrey free again without demanding ransom. Saladin's troops were unable to seize Kerak until the end of 1188, and Montréal some months later.

== Annulment of marriage ==
Humphrey and his wife, Isabella, were present at the camp of the crusaders who besieged Acre when Queen Sybilla and her two daughters died in 1190. Most barons of the realm regarded Isabella as Sybilla's lawful heir, stating that Guy had lost his claim to rule after his wife and their children died. However, they also felt Humphrey was unsuitable to rule the kingdom, especially because he had refused to claim the throne against Sybilla and Guy in 1186. They preferred Conrad of Montferrat, a crusader leader who had prevented Saladin from occupying Tyre.

Isabella's stepfather, Balian of Ibelin, was one of Conrad's supporters. He and his partisans decided that the marriage of Isabella and Humphrey should be annulled. The marriage was childless. The contemporaneous Itinerarium Regis Ricardi describes Humphrey, around 1190, as "more like a woman than a man, gentle in his dealings and with a bad stammer". Isabella's mother, Maria Comnena, entered Isabella's tent and forced her to leave Humphrey.

Maria Comnena swore that Baldwin IV had forced her daughter to marry Humphrey at the age of eight. Ubaldo Lanfranchi, the papal legate and archbishop of Pisa, and Philip of Dreux, the bishop of Beauvais, annulled Humphrey's marriage to Isabella. During an inquiry ordered by Pope Innocent III into the prelates' decision, a group of knights who were present at the proceedings stated that both Isabella and Humphrey had protested the annulment. Before he died, Archbishop Baldwin of Canterbury forbade the marriage of Isabella and Conrad, stating that they would both commit adultery if they married. Ignoring the archbishop's ban, they married on 24 November 1190.

== Last years ==
Humphrey was among the barons who accompanied Guy of Lusignan, who did not renounce the kingdom, to meet King Richard I of England in Limassol in Cyprus in May 1191. Both men did homage to Richard. Richard dispatched Humphrey, who was fluent in Arabic, to open negotiations with Saladin's brother, Al-Adil, in Lydda (now Lod in Israel). No agreement was reached, although Richard offered his sister Joan's hand to Al-Adil and the Holy Land as her dowry.

Two men murdered Conrad of Montferrat in Tyre on 28 April 1192. Although one of them confessed that Rashid ad-Din Sinan, head of the Assassins, had sent them to kill him, Humphrey was one of the suspects accused by contemporaneous sources of hiring them. Modern historians are unanimous in saying that Humphrey was innocent, pointing out that his "career was not notable for displays of initiative in any case". The widowed Isabella married Count Henry II of Champagne in Acre on 5 May 1192.

Humphrey died in 1198, shortly after Isabella, who had again been widowed, married King Aimery of Cyprus. In 1229, Humphrey's patrimony, Toron, was restored to the Kingdom of Jerusalem in accordance with the treaty of Sultan Al-Kamil of Egypt and Holy Roman Emperor Frederick II. The domain was seized by Maria of Antioch, who was the great-granddaughter of Humphrey's sister, Isabella of Toron.

== Genealogical table ==
Genealogy of the lords of Toron, Oultrejourdain, Nablus, and Ramla

Humphrey I of Toron
Humphrey II of Toron	heiress of Banyas
Humphrey III of Toron
Humphrey IV of Toron

Maurice of Montreal	Guy of Milly
Isabella	Philip of Milly
Stephanie of Milly
Isabella

Stephanie	Baldwin I of Ramla
Helvis of Ramla
Baldwin II of Ramla	Balian of Ibelin

== See also ==
- War of the Succession of Champagne

== Sources ==
- Baldwin, Marsall W. (1969). "The Decline and Fall of Jerusalem, 1174–1189". In Setton, Kenneth M.; Baldwin, Marshall W. (eds.). A History of the Crusades, Volume I: The First Hundred Years. The University of Wisconsin Press. pp. 590–621. ISBN 0-299-04844-6.
- Barber, Malcolm (2012). The Crusader States. Yale University Press. ISBN 978-0-300-11312-9.
- Gillingham, John (1999). Richard I. Yale University Press. ISBN 978-0-300-09404-6.
- Hamilton, Bernard (2000). The Leper King and His Heirs: Baldwin IV and the Crusader Kingdom of Jerusalem. Cambridge University Press. ISBN 978-0-521-64187-6.
- Hamilton, Bernard (2016). "Queen Alice of Cyprus". In Boas, Adrian J. (ed.). The Crusader World. The University of Wisconsin Press. pp. 225–240. ISBN 978-0-415-82494-1.
- Painter, Sidney (1969). "The Third Crusade: Richard the Lionhearted and Philip Augustus". In Setton, Kenneth M.; Wolff, Robert Lee; Hazard, Harry (eds.). A History of the Crusades, Volume II: The Later Crusades, 1189–1311. The University of Wisconsin Press. pp. 45–85. ISBN 0-299-04844-6.
- Runciman, Steven (1989a). A History of the Crusades, Volume II: The Kingdom of Jerusalem and the Frankish East, 1100-1187. Cambridge University Press. ISBN 0-521-06163-6.
- Runciman, Steven (1989b). A History of the Crusades, Volume III: The Kingdom of Acre and the Later Crusades. Cambridge University Press. ISBN 0-521-06163-6.
- Williams, Patrick A. (1970). "The Assassination of Conrad of Montferrat: Another Suspect?". Traditio. 26. Fordham University: 381–389. doi:10.1017/S0362152900005109. ISSN 0362-1529.

Humphrey IV of Toron House of Toron Born: c. 1166 Died: 1198
Preceded by Humphrey II	Lord of Toron; 1179–1180	Succeeded by Acquired by the Crown
