= Gervase of Bazoches =

Prince of Galilee
- Reign: 1105/06–1108
- Predecessor: Hugh of Fauquembergues
- Successor: Tancred
- Died: 1108; Damascus
- Religion: Roman Catholicism

Gervase of Bazoches, who is also known as Gervaise (died in Damascus in May 1108), was Prince of Galilee from 1105/1106 until his death. He was born into a French noble family but migrated to the Holy Land, where King Baldwin I of Jerusalem made him senechal in the early 1100s and appointed him prince of Galilee in 1105/1106. Gervase was captured during a raid by Toghtekin, atabeg of Damascus, who had Gervase executed after Baldwin I refused to surrender three important towns in exchange for Gervase's release.

== Early life ==
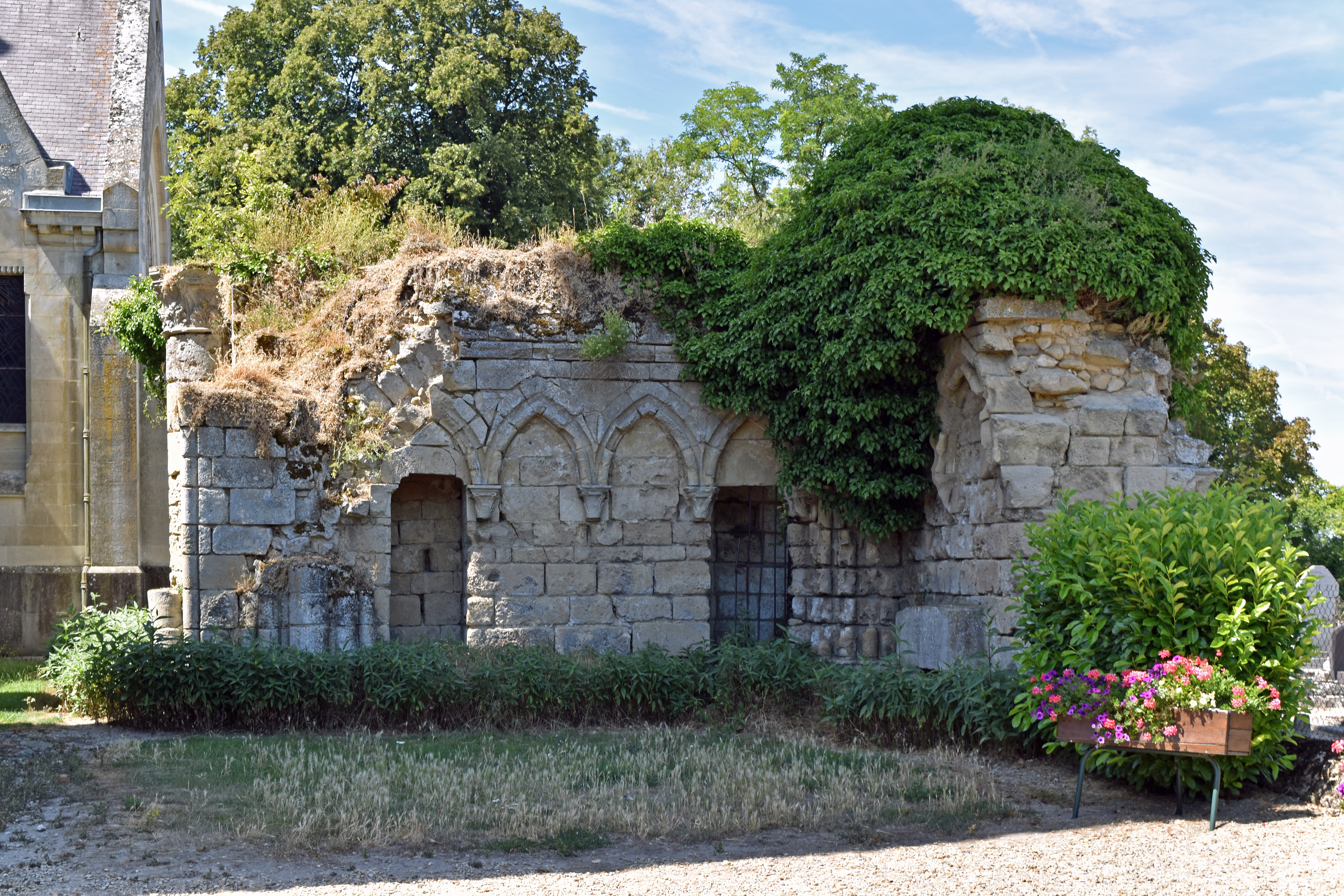
Ruins of the church of Mont-Notre-Dame

The contemporaneous Guibert of Nogent described Gervase as a "knight ... of noble blood, from the castle of Basilcas in Soissons". Albert of Aix referred to Gervase as "a famous and very noble man who was born in the realm of western France". Gervase's brother Hugh was lord of Bazoches-sur-Vesles, a village near Soissons. They were related to the lords of Milly. Gervase was the advocate of the church in Mont-Notre-Dame before he settled in the Holy Land.

== Prince of Galilee ==
Gervase became an important member of the royal court in the Kingdom of Jerusalem. He witnessed one of the charters of Baldwin I of Jerusalem as Gervasius dapifer (or senechal) in 1104. After Hugh of Fauquembergues, Prince of Galilee, was ambushed and killed during a pillaging raid in late 1105 or early 1106, the king conferred Galilee on Gervase. In 1106, the Muslims of Tyre attacked the Galilean fortress of Toron while Toghtekin, the atabeg of Damascus, raided the region of Tiberias, but they could not do much harm. Baldwin and Toghtekin's envoys signed an armistice, temporarily ending the Muslim raids against Galilee.

Toghtekin again invaded Galilee, and captured Gervase and his retainers outside Tiberias in early 1108. He demanded Acre, Haifa, and Tiberias as their ransom from Baldwin, who was only willing to pay a large sum of money. Outraged by the king's answer, Toghtekin ordered Gervase be executed in Damascus in May. On Toghtekin's order, his soldiers tied Gervase to a tree and shot arrows at him until he died. His scalp was put on a pole to be carried before Toghtekin's army and his skull was made into a goblet for Toghtekin. After Gervase's death, Baldwin granted the title Prince of Galilee to Tancred, who had held the principality before Hugh of Fauquembergues. Royal officials administered the principality during the following five years.

== Sources ==
- Asbridge, Thomas (2012). The Crusades: The War for the Holy Land. Simon and Schuster. ISBN 978-1-84983-688-3.
- Kostick, Conor (2008). The Social Structure of the First Crusade. BRILL. ISBN 978-90-04-16665-3.
- Friedman, Yvonne (2002). Encounter Between Enemies: Captivity and Ransom in the Latin Kingdom of Jerusalem. BRILL. ISBN 90-04-11706-7.
- Morton, Nicholas (2016). Encountering Islam on the First Crusade. Cambridge University Press. ISBN 978-1-107-15689-0.
- Murray, Alan V. (2000). The Crusader Kingdom of Jerusalem: A Dynastic History, 1099–1125. Prosopographica et Geneologica. ISBN 978-1-9009-3403-9.
- Runciman, Steven (1989). A History of the Crusades, Volume II: The Kingdom of Jerusalem and the Frankish East, 1100-1187. Cambridge University Press. ISBN 0-521-06163-6.

Gervase of Bazoches Died: 1108
Preceded by Hugh of Fauquembergues	Prince of Galilee; 1105/06–1108	Succeeded by Tancred
