= Toron =

Crusader castle in Lebanon

Coordinates: 33°11′44.57″N 35°24′44.37″E

Lordship of Toron
- Lordship of Toron in 1187
- Status: Vassal of Kingdom of Jerusalem
- Capital: Toron
- Common languages: Latin, Old French, Italian (also Arabic and Greek)
- Religion: Roman Catholicism, Eastern Catholicism, Greek Orthodoxy, Syriac Orthodoxy, Islam, Judaism
- Government: Feudal monarchy
  - c.1100: Godfrey of Bouillon
  - 1110: Hugh I of Jaffa
- Historical era: High Middle Ages

UNESCO World Heritage Site
- Official name: Qalaat Tibnin (Toron Castle)
- Part of: Mount Amel Castles
- Criteria: Cultural: ii, iv
- Reference: 1810
- Inscription: 2026 (48th Session)
- Endangered: 2026–present

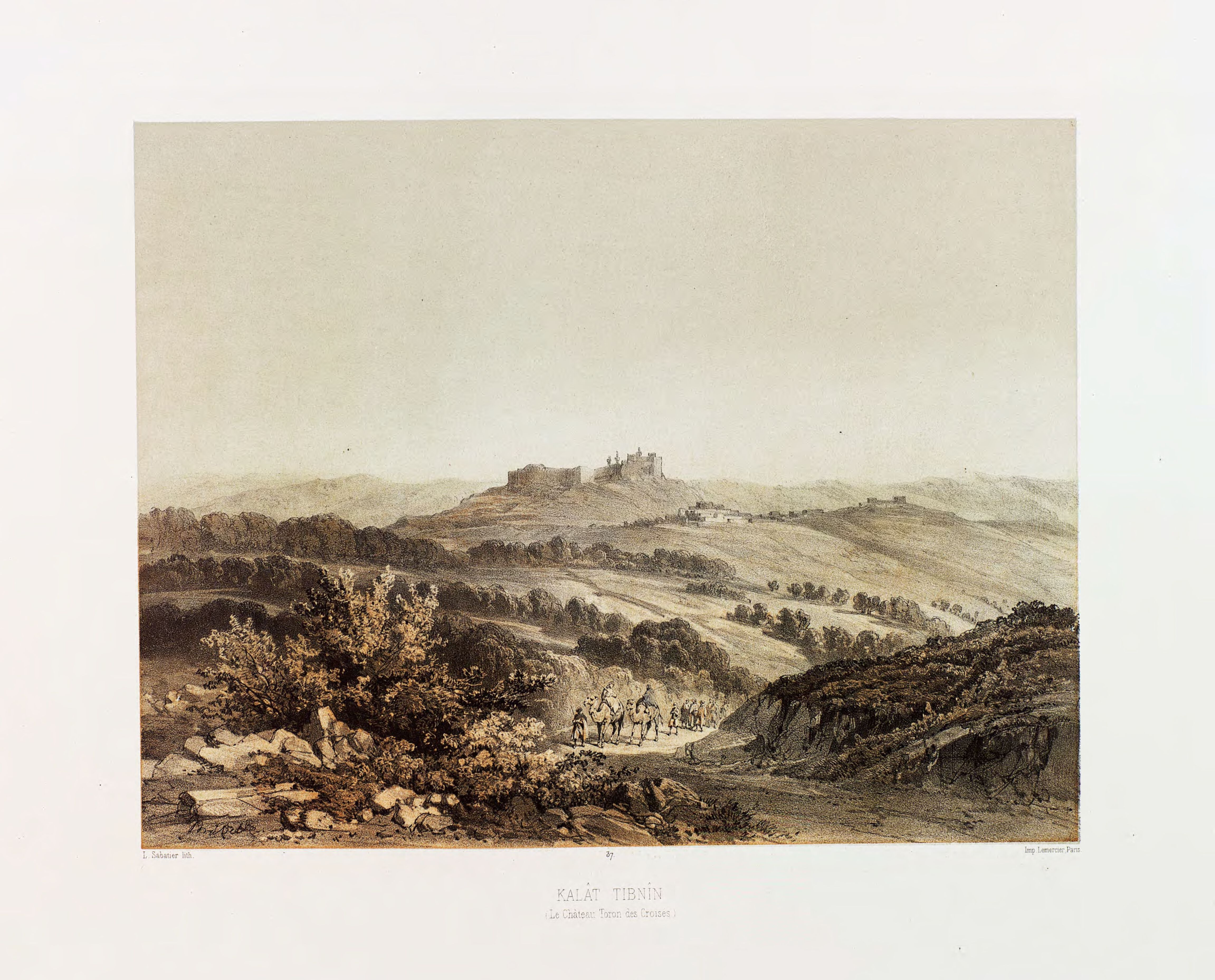
1857 sketch of Kalat Tibnin by van de Velde

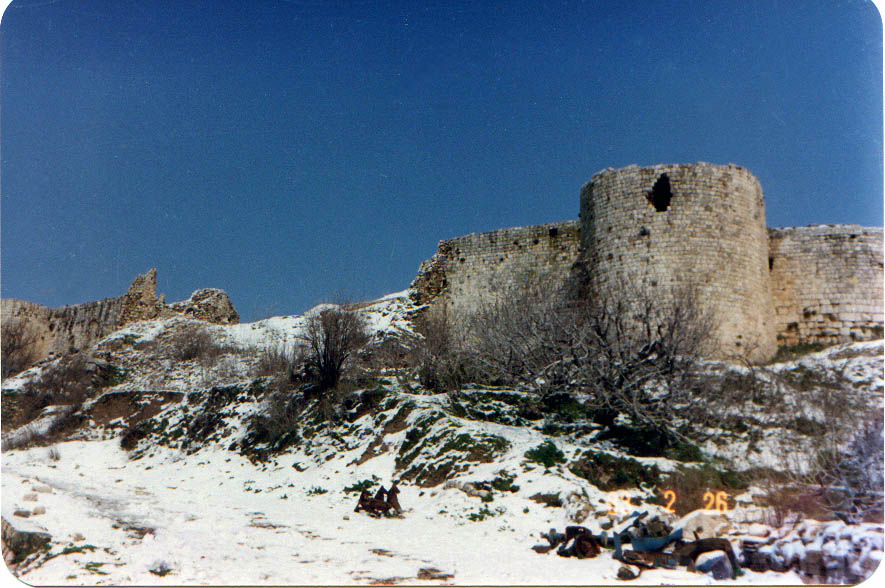
Crusader castle in the village of Tebnine

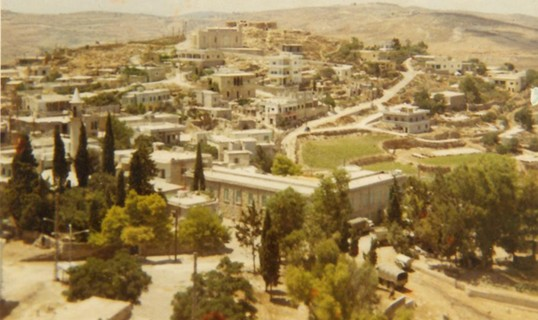
View from the Toron castle

Toron, now Tibnin or Tebnine in southern Lebanon, was a major Crusader castle, built in the Lebanon mountains on the road from Tyre to Damascus. The castle was the centre of the Lordship of Toron, a seigneury within the Kingdom of Jerusalem, actually a rear-vassalage of the Principality of Galilee.

== Lordship of Toron ==
The castle was built by Hugh of Fauquembergues, prince of Galilee, in 1106 AD to assist in capturing Tyre. After Hugh's death, the surroundings of Tibnin were raided by 'Izz al-Mulk, who killed the populace and made off with booty. Tibnin was made an independent seigneury, given to Humphrey I before 1109.

After Humphrey I of Toron, the castle and lordship of Toron successively passed to his descendants Humphrey II and Humphrey IV. Banias, which had been given to Baldwin II by the Assassins in 1128, was inherited by Toron in approximately 1148 when Humphrey II married the daughter of Renier Brus, lord of Banias and Assebebe. Humphrey II sold parts of Banias and Chastel Neuf to the Knights Hospitaller in 1157. Banias was merged with Toron until it fell to Nur ad-Din Zangi on 18 November 1164, and when it was recovered it became part of the Seigneury of Joscelin III of Edessa (see below).

Humphrey IV was also the prince of Oultrejourdain. Toron remained in Crusader possession until 1187, when it fell to the forces of Saladin after the Battle of Hattin in which Saladin all but destroyed the Crusader states. Ten years later, in November, 1197, Toron was besieged by the German contingent of the Crusade of 1197 and would have fallen. However, the Muslim garrison by the tribesmen of El-Seid and Fawaz held out until relief arrived from Egypt.

In 1219 Sultan al-Mu'azzam secretly had the defences of Toron, and of other castles, dismantled. This was done because the forces of the Fifth Crusade had captured the more crucial defences at Damietta on the Nile Delta and were now threatening Cairo. Sultan al-Mu'azzam was prepared to exchange the strongholds in Palestine for the ones in Egypt, but wished not to give strong defendable cities to the Crusaders if he could avoid it. Although the exchange proved unnecessary, the geographical position of the sites remained important for the Crusaders who were interested in recovering Jerusalem from Muslim control.

Indeed, despite their destruction, Toron, Safed and Hunin were recovered through a treaty in 1229, just two years after al-Mu'azzam's death on November 11, 1227, by Frederick II from Sultan al-Kamil. As Toron was sold in 1220 to the Teutonic Knights together with the territories called the Seigneury de Joscelin, it came to a dispute between them and Alice of Armenia, the niece of Humphrey IV and heiress of the lordship of Toron. Alice successfully claimed her rights before the High Court and Frederick II assigned the lordship to her. But it seems the Franks were not able to take possession of the territories, In 1239, when the treaty ended, Toron fell back to the Ayyubids. Two years later, in 1241, it was restored to the Crusaders due to a treaty between Richard of Cornwall and Sultan as-Salih of Egypt.

In 1244, the castles held out against the Khwarezmian army and accomplished their objective of disrupting the Muslim attack on Jerusalem. Nonetheless, Jerusalem eventually fell to the overwhelming number of the Khwarezmian and the primary mission of the castles became obsolete. However, Toron tenuously remained in Crusader hands and was periodically under siege by the Mamluks until the jihad of Baibars further isolated it. Following a brief siege, Baibars in a rare display of mercy allowed the small Crusader contingent to evacuate in exchange for surrender, which they accepted.

The lords of Toron tended to be very influential in the kingdom; Humphrey II was constable of Jerusalem. Humphrey IV was married to Isabella, King Amalric I's daughter (Toron passed into the royal domain during their marriage but its title was returned to Humphrey IV after their divorce). It was also one of the few to have a straight hereditary succession in the male line, at least for a few generations. The lords of Toron were also connected to the Lordship of Oultrejourdain by the marriage of Humphrey III and the maternal inheritance of Humphrey IV. Toron was later merged with the royal domain of Tyre, which went to a branch of Antioch, then their heirs from Montfort.

=== Lords of Toron ===
- Humphrey I of Toron (before 1109–after 1136)
- Humphrey II of Toron (before 1137–1179)
  - (Humphrey III predeceased his father)
- Humphrey IV of Toron (1179–1183)
- Royal domain (1183–1187)
- Humphrey IV (restored) (1190 – c. 1192)
  - occupied by Muslims until 1229 and the title not used
- Alice of Armenia (1229– after 1236), granddaughter of Humphrey III
- Maria of Antioch-Armenia (after 1236–1239), granddaughter of Alice and great-granddaughter of Isabella of Armenia, daughter of Humphrey III.
  - occupied by Muslims from 1239 until 1241
- Philip of Montfort (1241– before 1257)
- John of Montfort (before 1257–1283), Lord of Tyre. It was lost again in 1266
- Humphrey of Montfort (1283–1284), Lord of Beirut, Lord of Tyre
- Amaury of Montfort (1284–1304)
- Rupen of Montfort (1304–1313), Lord of Beirut
- Humphrey of Montfort (d. 1326), constable of Cyprus, titular lord of Beirut
- Eschiva of Montfort (d. bef 1350), wife of Peter I of Cyprus titular lord of Beirut

Toron had two vassals of its own, the Lordship of Chastel Neuf and the Lordship of Maron. Chastel Neuf was built by Hugh of Falkenberg around 1105 but was later given to the Hospitallers, until it fell to Nur ad-Din in 1167. Maron was given in 1229 to the Teutonic Knights in exchange for their claims on Toron.

== The castle ==
The castle of Toron occupies a steep hill, in fact a Bronze Age tell, north to the village of Tibnin, at a height of 725 metres (2,379 ft) above sea level. It is oval in shape with its outline following the contours of the tell. It once had twelve rectangular towers with one of them - to the south - having been the donjon. The castle, razed in 1266 by the Mamluks was rebuilt 500 years later in the mid-18th century by the Shiite sheikh Nasif al-Nassar during his struggle against the Ottoman rule. He used the ruins of the medieval walls as a basis for his rebuilding campaign and thus the castle today mainly appears as an Ottoman construction. The castle was then used as the home and base of the House of El-Assaad, the family of Nasif.

In 1881 it was noted that it was the residence of the local Governor, and that about twenty Muslims lived there.

The castle was damaged during the Israeli invasion of Lebanon in late 2024, and one of the medieval walls collapsed.

In July 2026, the Mount Amel Castles, including the Toron Castle, were designated by UNESCO as a World Heritage Site and immediately classified as endangered.

== See also ==
- List of Crusader castles
- Vassals of the Kingdom of Jerusalem

== Bibliography ==
- Conder, C.R.; Kitchener, H.H. (1881). The Survey of Western Palestine: Memoirs of the Topography, Orography, Hydrography, and Archaeology. Vol. 1. London: Committee of the Palestine Exploration Fund.
- Mathias Piana, "The Crusader Castle of Toron: First Results of its Investigation ", Crusades 5, 2006, pp.173–191
