= Margaliot =

Moshav in northern Israel

Margaliot: מרגליות (Hebrew)
- Moshav
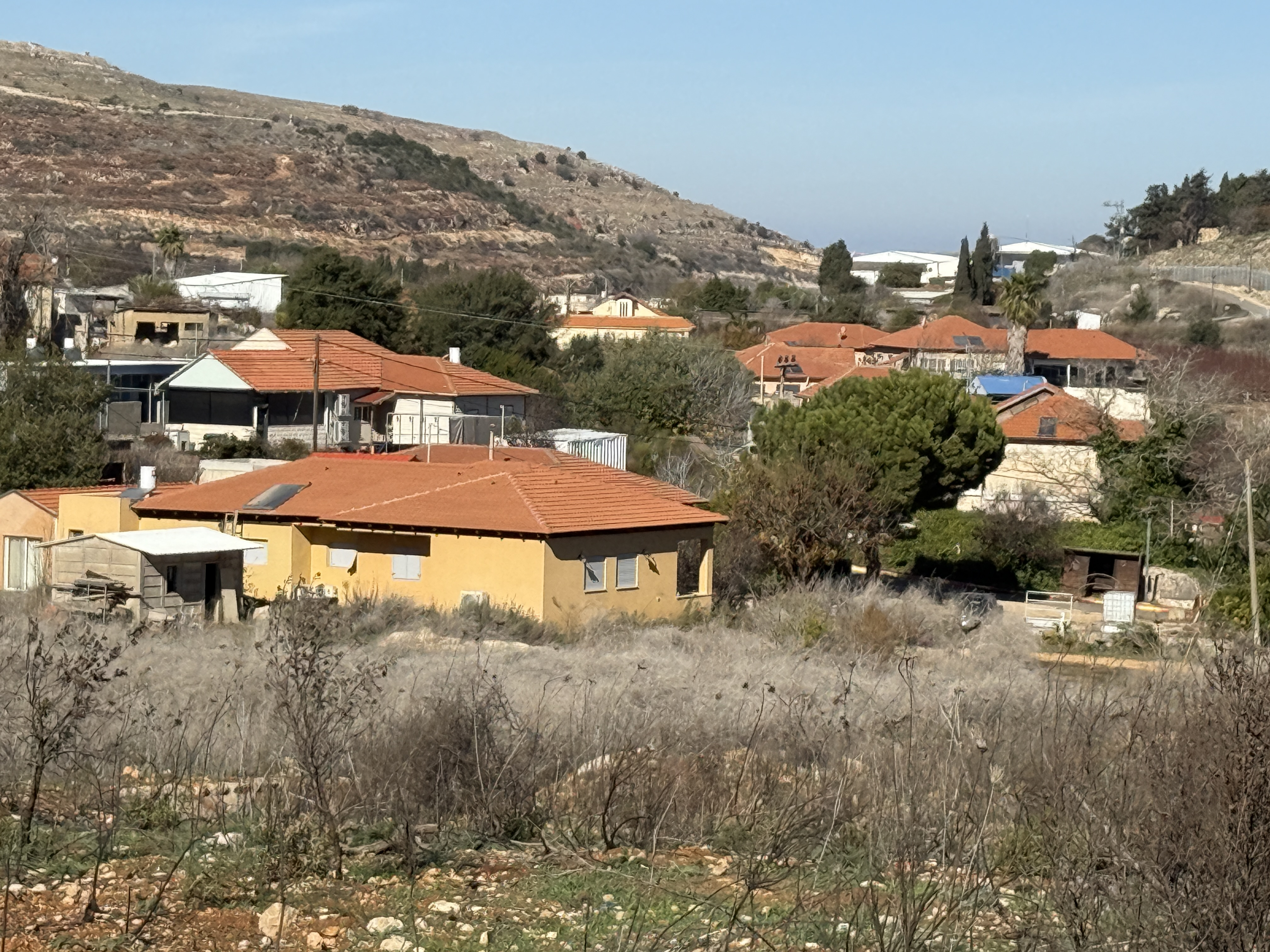
- View of Margaliot

- Location within Northeast Israel Location within Israel
- Coordinates: 33°12′52″N 35°32′41″E
- Country: Israel
- District: Northern
- Subdistrict: Safed
- Council: Mevo'ot HaHermon
- Affiliation: Moshavim Movement
- Founded: 1951
- Founder: Jewish immigrants from Yemen and Iraq
- Population (2024): 484

Margaliot (Hebrew: מרגליות) is a moshav in northern Israel. Located on the Naftali Mountains of the Upper Galilee, near the Lebanese border and the city of Kiryat Shmona, it falls under the jurisdiction of Mevo'ot HaHermon Regional Council. In 2024 it had a population of 484.

== Etymology ==
The moshav was named after agronomist Haim Margaliot-Kalvarisky, a principal director of the Jewish Colonisation Association (JCA) who was appointed by Baron Edmond de Rothschild to supervise the work of Jewish colonies in Galilee in the early twentieth century.

== History ==
A settlement existed at the site in the Iron Age I (1200-1000 BCE), and again from the Persian period (586-332 BCE) until the latter part of the Byzantine period (5th-6th centuries CE).

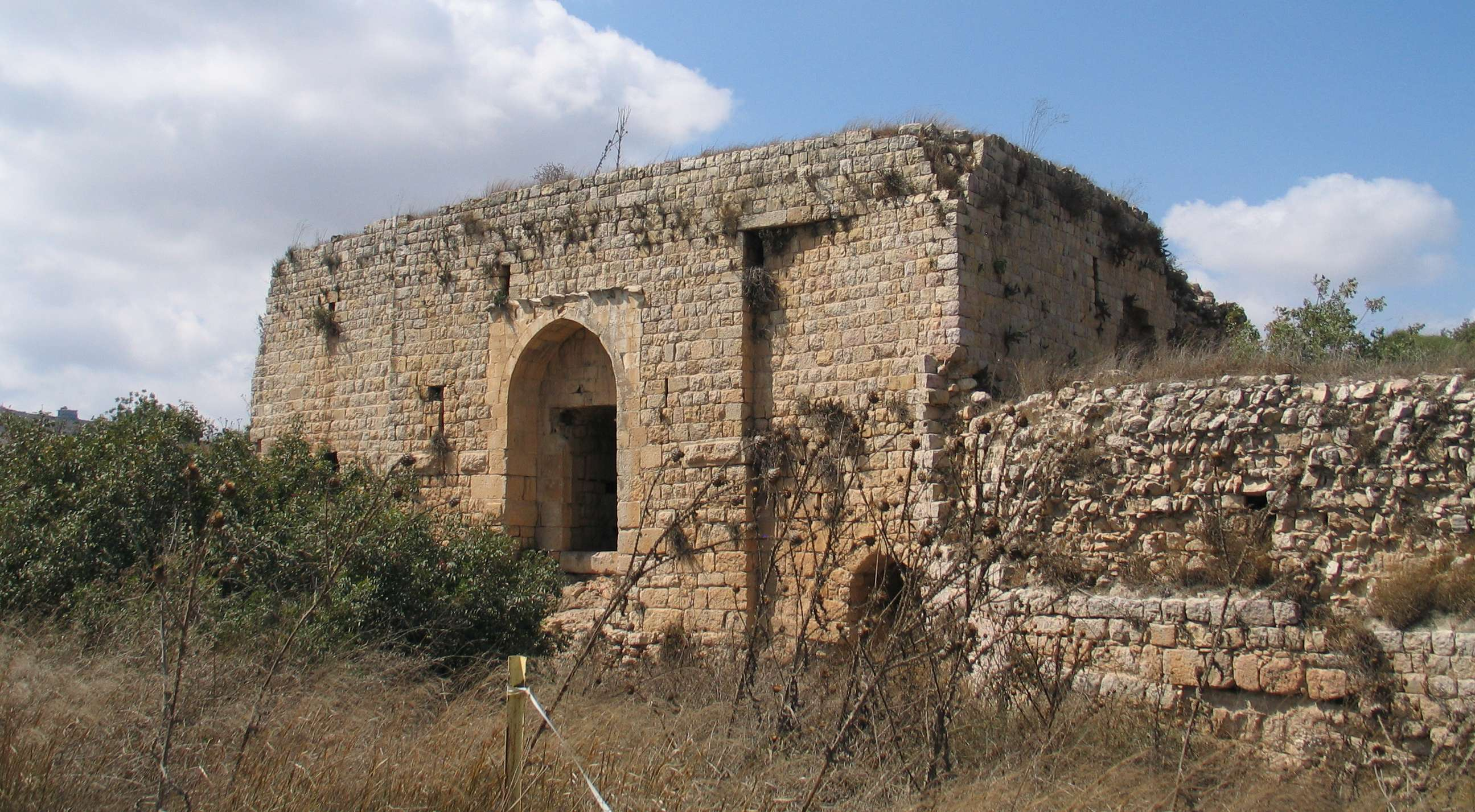
The ruins of the Crusader and Ottoman castle

The Crusader castle of Chastel Neuf (in medieval French) or Castellum Novum (in Latin), lit. "New Castle", was built around 1106-1107 immediately north of the current moshav. Refortified by Mamluk sultan Baibars in 1266, the castle was completely rebuilt in the 18th century by Zahir al-Umar, who ruled the Galilee in the 18th century (1730s–1775). Remains of the castle, covering an area of 9 dunams, include a rock-hewn Crusader moat, cisterns, and a vaulted gatehouse and other wall remains from the 18th century.

The moshav was built near the former Shiite Palestinian Arab village of Hunin, established in the 18th century and depopulated during the 1948 Arab-Israeli War. Margaliot was founded in 1951, by immigrants from Yemen and Iraq.

During the 2006 Lebanon War, 230 residents of Margaliot were evacuated to the Neve Hadassah youth village near Netanya due to Katyusha rocket fire from Lebanon.

In the Gaza war, Hezbollah targeted northern Israeli border communities, forcing evacuations, including in Margaliot. On October 21, two foreign workers from Thailand were wounded by shrapnel in an attack by Hezbollah in the Margaliot area. In March 2024, an anti-tank missile launched by Hezbollah on Margaliot resulted in the death of a foreign worker from India. In May 2024, the moshav cut all contact with the Israeli government and demanded the Israel Defence Forces (IDF) withdrawal.

== Notable people ==
- Yossi Sarid (1940–2015), politician and news commentator
