= Mont-Notre-Dame =

- Commune
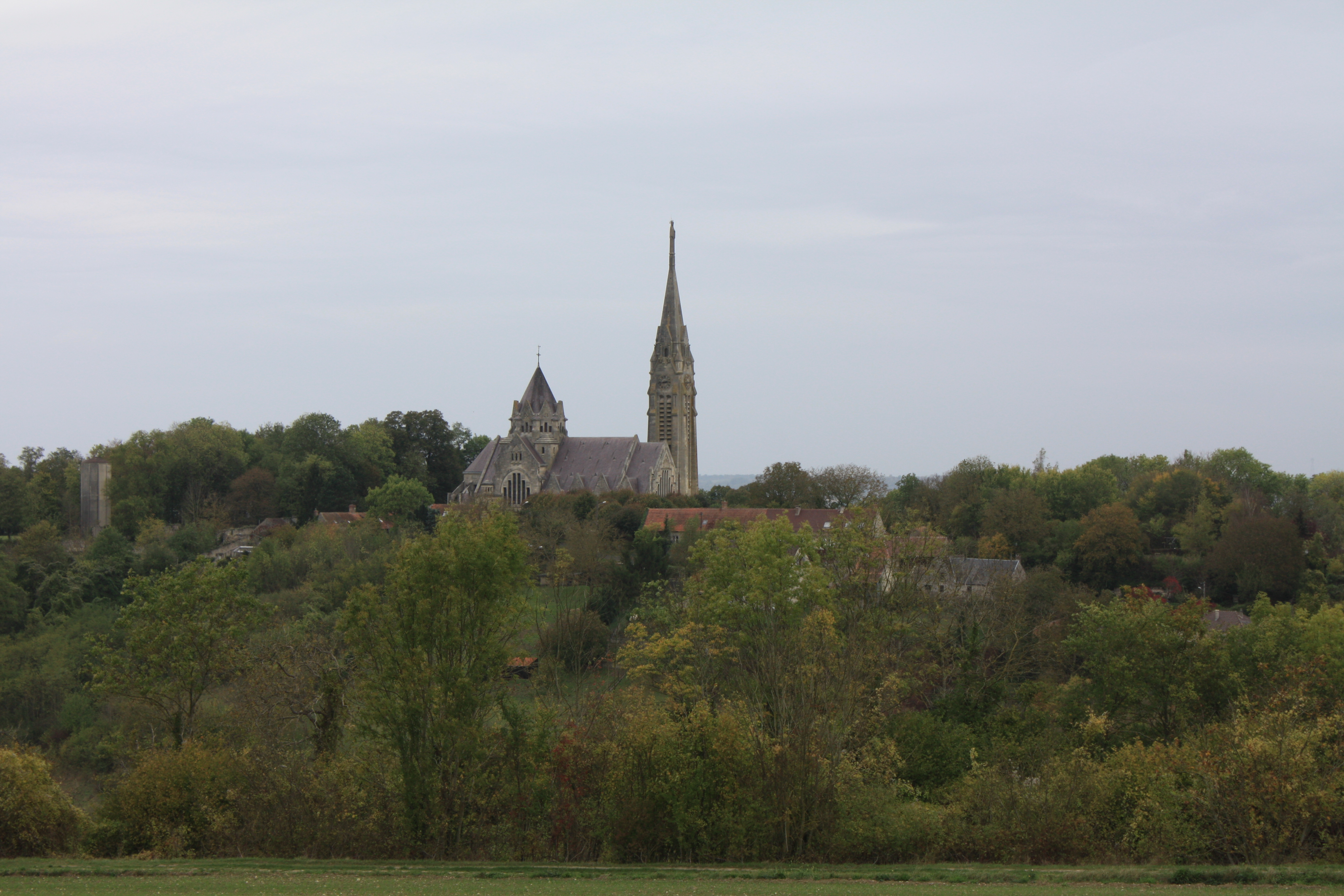
- A general view of Mont-Notre-Dame
- Location of Mont-Notre-Dame
- Location within France Location within Hauts-de-France
- Coordinates: 49°17′40″N 3°35′04″E
- Country: France
- Region: Hauts-de-France
- Department: Aisne
- Arrondissement: Soissons
- Canton: Fère-en-Tardenois
- Intercommunality: Val de l'Aisne

Government
  - Mayor (2026–32): Dominique Lafleur
- Area^{1}: 9.63 km^{2} (3.72 sq mi)
- Elevation: 70 m (230 ft)
- Highest elevation: 165 m (541 ft)
- Lowest elevation: 53 m (174 ft)
- Population (2023): 751
  - Density: 78.0/km^{2} (202/sq mi)
- Time zone: UTC+01:00 (CET)
  - Summer (DST): UTC+02:00 (CEST)
- INSEE/Postal code: 02520 /02220
- ^{1} French Land Register data, which excludes lakes, ponds, glaciers > 1 km^{2} (0.386 sq mi or 247 acres) and river estuaries.

Mont-Notre-Dame is a commune in the Aisne department located in Hauts-de-France, Northern France.

== Population ==
Historical population
Year	Pop.	±% p.a.
1968	715	—
1975	653	−1.29%
1982	580	−1.68%
1990	617	+0.78%
1999	633	+0.28%
2007	647	+0.27%
2012	716	+2.05%
2017	736	+0.55%
2023	751	+0.34%
Source: INSEE

== See also ==
- Communes of the Aisne department
