= Humphrey I of Toron =

Norman from Italy, fl. 1115

Humphrey I of Toron (Onfroy de Toron), a Norman, appears initially in 1115 as a vassal of Joscelin I of Edessa, prince of Galilee. The castle at Toron was built in the years after 1105, and so Humphrey most likely was lord of Toron from that date, having taken part in the First Crusade.

== Biography ==
He was the father of Humphrey II of Toron, whose mother is not known.

Humphrey I was certainly a Norman from Italy, and perhaps connected to the House of Hauteville who had settled in Southern Italy. One of his descendants of the fifteenth century claimed Tancred of Hauteville as ancestor. Family tradition was that their origins were in Denmark, possibly Viking.
