= First siege of Arsuf =

1099 failed siege after the First Crusade

Siege of Arsuf
- Part of the Crusades
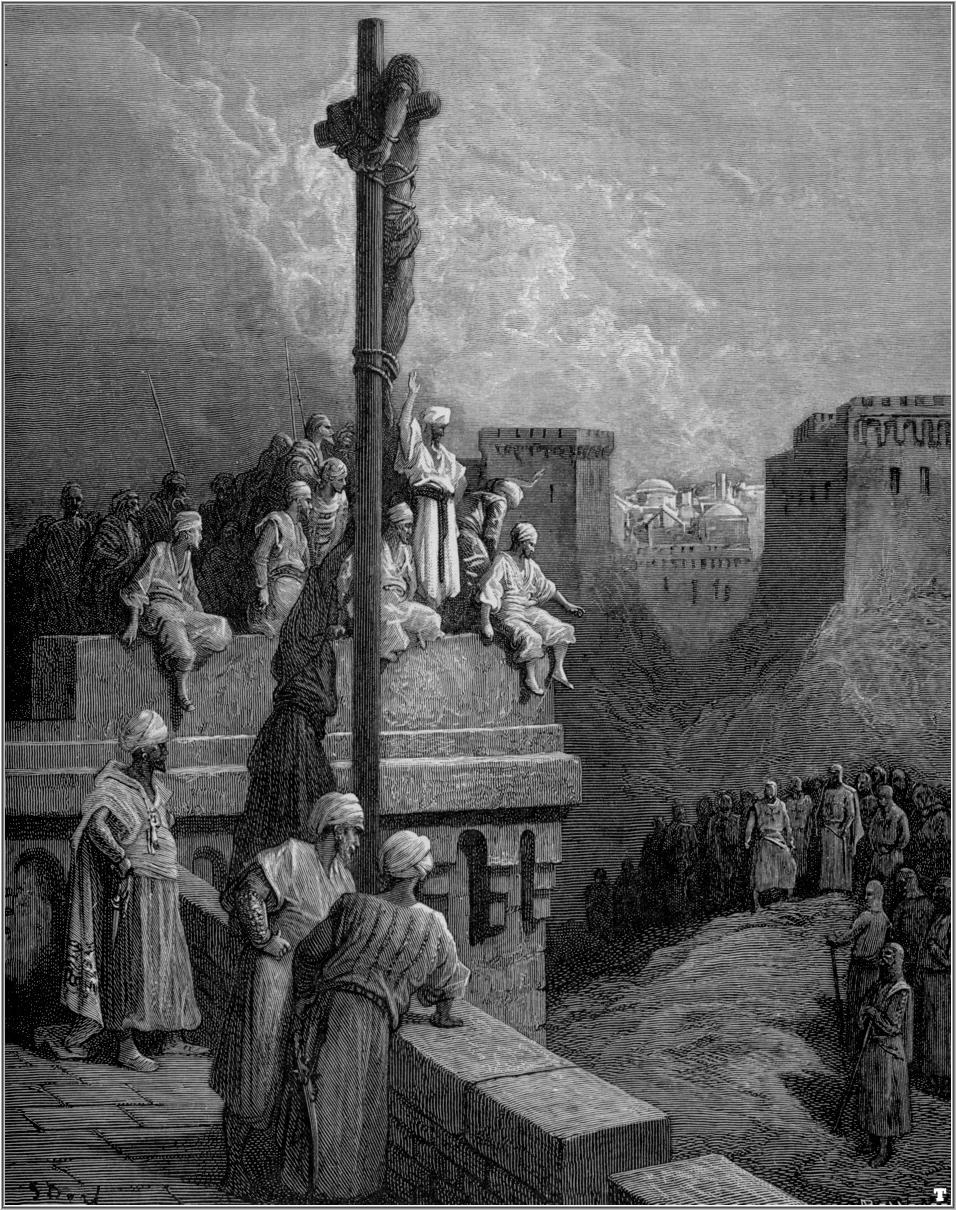
- Gerard of Avesnes exposed on the walls of Arsuf. Illustration by Gustave Doré (1877)
Date	Late October – Mid December 1099
Location	Arsuf, Fatimid Caliphate 32°11′43″N 34°48′24″E
Result	Fatimid victory

Belligerents
Fatimid Caliphate	Kingdom of Jerusalem

Commanders and leaders
(Fatimid Caliphate) Governor of Arsuf	Godfrey of Bouillon

Strength
500~1,000	3,000

Casualties and losses
Unknown	Unknown
- Location within Israel

The First siege of Arsuf, originally Apollonia, took place in 1099, just after the First Crusade. It was carried out by Godfrey of Bouillon after the city failed to pay a previously agreed tribute. The attempt to capture the city failed for want of ships.

== Background ==
Arsuf was an ancient city in Judea dating from the late Roman era, situated on a cliff above the Mediterranean Sea, about 21 miles south of Caesarea, now in Israel. The city fell to the Muslims in 640 and was fortified to protect against attacks by the Byzantine armies.

Following the Siege of Jerusalem and the establishment of the Kingdom of Jerusalem in 1099, its ruler Godfrey of Bouillon reached an agreement with the citizens of Arsuf after it was known that he intended to stay in Jerusalem and reconciled with Raymond of Toulouse. The treaty stated that Arsuf would pay tribute to Godfrey and included an exchange of hostages that included Godfrey's knight, Gerard of Avesnes. However the Muslim hostages escaped, giving Arsuf no reason to pay their tribute. Godfrey subsequently besieged the city in October 1099.

== Siege ==
An account by Albert of Aachen stated that Godfrey spent six weeks building mangenae or stone throwers, which were used to support two siege towers. The number of Godfrey's men, however, was severely reduced after most of the Crusaders returned home via Laodicea. In the end the two assaults made on Arsuf were defeated when the garrison set the siege towers on fire. Godfrey was left with no options and ended the siege.

During the siege, while the Crusaders pounded the walls with catapults, the Fatimids had Gerard hung from the mast of an old ship that had been lying in the city. They raised Gerard up to be in view of the attacking Crusaders. Gerard begged Godfrey to take pity on him. Godrey responded that while Gerard was the bravest of knights, he could not call off the attack. Godfrey said that it was better for Gerard to be the sole casualty than to Arsuf to remain a danger to Christian pilgrims. Gerard then asked that his property be donated to the Holy Sepulchre, of which Godfrey was defender, instead of to the king. The Crusaders continued their attack. Gerard was wounded multiple times, though he managed to survive and make it back to Jerusalem.

The city rulers offered to surrender to Raymond of Saint-Gilles, but Godfrey refused. Raymond even encouraged the garrison at Arsuf to hold out against Godfrey, touting his perceived weakness. Within Godfrey's army, Franco I of Maasmechelen, a relative of Godfrey, is known to have died in the battle.

== Second siege of Arsuf ==
In 1101 King Baldwin I began a second siege and finally took the city on 29 April, after a siege by land and sea with no Latin casualties. The Muslim populace surrendered after three days. Baldwin allowed the inhabitants to withdraw to Ascalon, granting them safe conduct, bearing any goods they could carry, and his troops rebuilt the city.

== Aftermath ==
In 1187, Arsuf was captured by the Muslims, but fell again to the Crusaders on 7 September 1191 after the Battle of Arsuf, fought between the forces of Richard the Lionheart and Saladin.
