= Garnier de Nablus =

10th Grand Master of the Knights Hospitaller (1190–1192)

Grand Master of the Knights Hospitaller
- In office 1190–1192
- Preceded by: Armengol de Aspa
- Succeeded by: Geoffroy de Donjon

Personal details
- Born: 1147 Nablus, Kingdom of Jerusalem
- Died: 31 August 1192 (aged 44–45) Acre, Ayyubid Sultanate

Military service
- Allegiance: Knights Hospitaller
- Years of service: 1173–1192
- Battles/wars: Third Crusade; Battle of Hattin; Battle of Arsuf

Garnier de Nablus (1147 – 31 August 1192), also known as Garnier of Syria, was the grand master of the Knights Hospitaller from 1190 to 1192, succeeding Armengol de Aspa. He fought at the Battle of Arsuf in 1191 during the Third Crusade. It was under his magistracy that the headquarters of the Order were transferred from Tyre to Acre. He was succeeded by Geoffroy de Donjon.

== Biography ==
The name Garnier de Nablus possibly links him to a well attested family settled in Nablus, but he could also be of English origin because he was Prior of the Langue d'Angleterre, an office normally entrusted to a native of the language. He was Lord of Gibelin from 1173 to 1175, and then grand preceptor of the Order on two occasions, from 1176 to 1177 and from 1180 to 1184. He was then invested, on April 10, 1185, with the functions of Prior of the Langue d'Angleterre until 1189, a function which he combined in 1189 with the office of Grand Commander of the Hospitaller.

Garnier was seriously injured at the disastrous Battle of Hattin in 1187, which decided the fate of Jerusalem. He nevertheless managed to reach the city of Ascalon and recovered from his wounds. He took over from Armengol de Aspa to become Grand Master at an unknown date, but generally considered to be between July 1189 and 25 March 1190. He was in Paris from July 1189 to 24 March 1190 waiting for Richard I of England. He embarked in Marseille in the summer of 1190 for Messina, arriving on 23 September where he met Philippe Auguste who had arrived from Genoa on 16 September. A document dated 8 October 1190 in Messina confirms the presence of the two kings, the Grand Master of the Hospitaller and Robert IV de Sablé, soon to be Grand Master of the Templars.

== Third Crusade ==
Garnier left Messina on 10 April 1191, with Richard's fleet, which then anchored on 1 May at the port of Lemesos. Richard continued to Cyprus on 6 May to avenge the crews of three English ships thrown ashore by the storm that the Emperor of Cyprus Isaac Komnenos had attacked. Richard subdued the island on 11 May despite the mediation of Garnier. They set sail again on 5 June and sank a Muslim ship that was going to supply Acre on 7 June, in sight of Margat, a fortress belonging to the Hospitallers. They arrived in Acre on 8 June to the acclamations of the attackers. There they found Philippe Auguste leading the siege. The besiegers eventually got the upper hand and, under the helpless eyes of Saladin, the besieged capitulated on 12 July 1191.

Philip Augustus left the Holy Land on 31 July 1191. On 22 August 1191, Richard left Acre in the direction of Jaffa. The Templars formed the vanguard, the Breton and Angevin knights the first group, in the second the Poitevins under the orders of Guy de Lusignan, the third the Normans and the English and at the rear, the Hospitallers. The foot soldiers were on the left wing and on the rear, on the right wing the convoy between the troops and the sea. Richard with an elite troop was ready to intervene where necessary. The Hospitallers were attacked on September 7, arriving at the gardens of Arsuf.

=== Battle of Arsuf ===
Richard had previously ordered no direct engagement with the enemy on the march to capture Jaffa during the Battle of Arsuf. Situated at the rear of the military column, Garnier's Hospitallers were under heavy pressure by the Muslims. They were constantly harassed with arrows and small scale hit-and-run attacks in an attempt to disrupt and lure the crusader column into full battle. According to the 13th-century manuscript Itinerarium Regis Ricardi, Garnier was near breaking point and rode forward in person to try to persuade Richard to attack:

My lord the king, we are violently pressed by the enemy, and are in danger of eternal infamy, as if we did not dare to return their blows; we are each of us losing our horses one after another, and why should we bear with them any further?

He also asked that Richard relieve the pressure with a cavalry charge. Richard refused and replied, "Good Master, it is you who must sustain the attack; no man can be everywhere at once." When the pressure increased, the Grand Master and one other knight, Baldwin de Carreo, charged the Saracens. They were joined soon after by the rest of the Hospitaller force. Richard, seeing that his orders were already disobeyed, signaled for a full charge. This caught the enemy at a vulnerable moment, and their ranks were broken. Thus, in some ways, Garnier helped win the battle, though in contravention of Richard's orders.

== Later years and death ==
Garnier is last mentioned in connection with the engagement of Betenoble on 12 June 1192, during which he punished a brother of the Order, Robert of Bruges, for attacking the enemy without his order. Garnier of Nablus died in the second half of 1192, probably on August 31. The first mention of his successor Geoffroy de Donjon is in January 1193.

== In popular culture ==
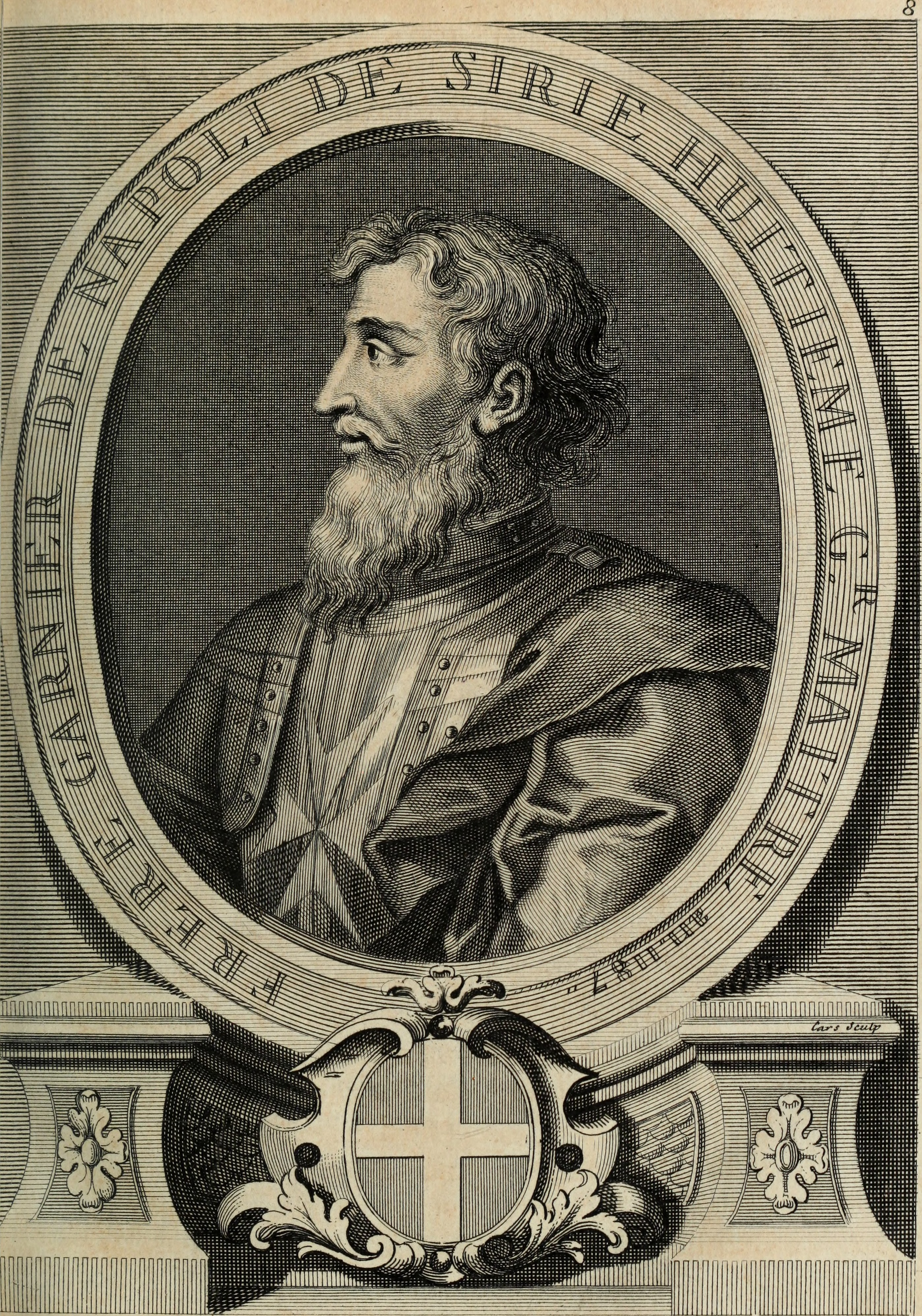
Garnier de Napoli de Sirie, by Jean-François Cars (c. 1725)

In the video game Assassin's Creed (2007), Garnier de Naplouse (the game uses the French Naplouse instead of Nablus) is one of the nine main assassination targets. In this game, Garnier is portrayed as a twisted doctor performing mind-altering experiments on patients from his hospital in Acre, as well as a secret member of the Knights Templar.

Actor Donald Sumpter portrays Garnier de Nablus in the 2008 BBC docudrama series Heroes and Villains, which features a reenactment of the Battle of Arsuf.

== See also ==
- Cartulaire général de l'Ordre des Hospitaliers
- List of Knights Hospitaller sites
- Langue (Knights Hospitaller)
- Flags of the Knights Hospitaller

== Bibliography ==
- Barber, Malcolm (2012). The New Knighthood. A History of the Order of the Temple. Cambridge University Press. ISBN 978-1107604735.
- Bronstein, Judith (2005). The Hospitallers and the Holy Land: Financing the Latin East, 1187-1274. Boydell Press. ISBN 9781843831310.
- Delaville Le Roulx, Joseph (1904). Les Hospitaliers en Terre Sainte et à Chypre (1100-1310). E. Leroux, Paris.
- Demurger, Alain (2013). Les Hospitaliers, De Jérusalem à Rhodes 1050-1317. Tallandier, Paris. ISBN 979-1021000605.
- Flavigny, Bertrand Galimard (2006). Histoire de l'ordre de Malte. Perrin, Paris. ISBN 978-2262021153.
- Harot, Eugène (1911). Essai d'armorial des grands maîtres de l'Ordre de Saint-Jean de Jérusalem. Collegio araldico.
- Josserand, Philippe (2009). Prier et combattre, Dictionnaire européen des ordres militaires au Moyen Âge. Fayard, Paris. ISBN 978-2213627205.
- Lane-Poole, Stanley (1898). Saladin and the Fall of the Kingdom of Jerusalem. Heroes of the nations,[v. 24]. Putnam and Sons, New York. ISBN 9780524007624.
- Lewis, Kevin James (2017). The Counts of Tripoli and Lebanon in the Twelfth Century: Sons of Saint-Gilles. Routledge. ISBN 978-1-4724-5890-2.
- Lock, Peter (2006). The Routledge Companion to the Crusades. Routledge. doi:10.4324/9780203389638. ISBN 0-415-39312-4.
- Murray, Alan V. (2006). The Crusades—An Encyclopedia. ABC-CLIO. ISBN 978-1-57607-862-4.
- Nicholson, Helen J. (2001). The Knights Hospitaller. Boydell & Brewer. ISBN 978-1843830382.
- Runciman, Steven (1952). A History of the Crusades, Volume Two: The Kingdom of Jerusalem and the Frankish East, 1100-1187. Cambridge University Press. ISBN 9780521347716.
- Setton, Kenneth M. (1969). A History of the Crusades. University of Wisconsin Press.
- Tyerman, Christopher (2006). God's War: A New History of the Crusades. Belknap Press. ISBN 978-0-674-02387-1.
- Vann, Theresa M. (2006). Order of the Hospital. The Crusades––An Encyclopedia, pp. 598–605.
- Miller, David (2013). Richard the Lionheart: the Mighty Crusader. Hachette UK. pp. 76–77. ISBN 9781780227115.
- "Chapter XIX". Itinerarium Peregrinorum et Gesta Regis Ricardi.

Preceded by Armengol de Aspa	Grand Master of the Knights Hospitaller; 1190–1192	Succeeded by Geoffroy de Donjon
