= Fernando Afonso of Portugal =

Portuguese knight

- Title: Grand Master

Personal life
- Born: 1135
- Died: 1 March 1207 (aged 71–72)

Religious life
- Religion: Catholic
- Order: Knights Hospitaller

Senior posting
- Period in office: 1202–1206
- Predecessor: Pierre de Mirmande
- Successor: Geoffroy le Rat

Fernando Afonso of Portugal (1135 – 1 March 1207) was the twelfth Grand Master of the Knights Hospitaller, serving between 1202–1206. He was the oldest son of Afonso Henriques, the first king of the Kingdom of Portugal. Fernando would never inherit the crown as he was born out of wedlock. He formally succeeded the interim Grand Master Pierre de Mirmande installed after the death of Geoffroy de Donjon. He resigned in 1206 and was succeeded by Geoffroy le Rat.

== Biography ==
Fernando Afonso was for a short period of time alferes-mor of the Kingdom of Portugal. He then proceeded to join the Knights Templar, followed later on by the Knights Hospitaller. He became Master of the Knights Hospitaller in the Iberian Peninsula in 1198, as part of the Langue de Castille, León and Portugal. He then became Grand Master of the Order in 1202. A few years later he renounced his position as Grand Master and returned to Portugal.

Not being able to make himself obeyed by the knights of the Order, they reproached him for having held the general chapter in the fortress of Margat outside the kingdom of Jerusalem, a reproach of very poor quality. The reason for this is rather that he had not held any responsibility in the Order. The only highlight of his magisterium was the promulgation of a new statute drawn up during the General Chapter, for which he was reproached. He eventually resigned from his office.

The last act is dated 1206 and the first act of his successor is also dated 1206, so it can be estimated that he gave up his office in mid-1206. This is the second time in the history of the Order that a Grand Master resigned. He retired to Portugal where he died on 1 March 1207, allegedly poisoned. He was succeeded by Geoffrey le Rat.

== Burial ==
His remains were buried in Santarém, at the Church of São João de Alporão.

== See also ==
- Cartulaire général de l'Ordre des Hospitaliers
- List of Knights Hospitaller sites
- Langue (Knights Hospitaller)
- Flags of the Knights Hospitaller

== Bibliography ==
- Barber, Malcolm (2012). The New Knighthood. A History of the Order of the Temple. Cambridge University Press. ISBN 978-1107604735.
- Bronstein, Judith (2005). The Hospitallers and the Holy Land: Financing the Latin East, 1187-1274. Boydell Press. ISBN 9781843831310.
- Delaville Le Roulx, Joseph (1904). Les Hospitaliers en Terre Sainte et à Chypre (1100-1310). E. Leroux, Paris.
- Demurger, Alain (2013). Les Hospitaliers, De Jérusalem à Rhodes 1050-1317. Tallandier, Paris. ISBN 979-1021000605.
- Flavigny, Bertrand Galimard (2006). Histoire de l'ordre de Malte. Perrin, Paris. ISBN 978-2262021153.
- Harot, Eugène (1911). Essai d'armorial des grands maîtres de l'Ordre de Saint-Jean de Jérusalem. Collegio araldico.
- Josserand, Philippe (2009). Prier et combattre, Dictionnaire européen des ordres militaires au Moyen Âge. Fayard, Paris. ISBN 978-2213627205.
- Lock, Peter (2006). The Routledge Companion to the Crusades. Routledge. doi:10.4324/9780203389638. ISBN 0-415-39312-4.
- Mattoso, José (2014). D. Afonso Henriques (in Portuguese) (2º ed.). Lisbon: Temas e Debates. ISBN 978-972-759-911-0.
- Murray, Alan V. (2006). The Crusades—An Encyclopedia. ABC-CLIO. ISBN 978-1-57607-862-4.
- Nicholson, Helen J. (2001). The Knights Hospitaller. Boydell & Brewer. ISBN 978-1843830382.
- Oliveira e Costa, João Paulo (2013). Episódios da monarquia portuguesa (in Portuguese). Lisbon: Temas e Debates. ISBN 978-989-644-248-4.
- Runciman, Steven (1954). A History of the Crusades, Volume Three: The Kingdom of Acre and the Later Crusades. Cambridge University Press. ISBN 9780521347723.
- Setton, Kenneth M. (1969). A History of the Crusades. University of Wisconsin Press.
- Tyerman, Christopher (2006). God's War: A New History of the Crusades. Belknap Press. ISBN 978-0-674-02387-1.
- Vann, Theresa M. (2006). Order of the Hospital. The Crusades––An Encyclopedia, pp. 598–605.
- Vasconcelos e Sousa, Bernardo. "Do Condado Portucalense à Monarquia Portuguesa (Séculos XI–XII". In Rui Ramos (ed.). História de Portugal (in Portuguese).

| Preceded by Pierre de Mirmande | Grand Master of the Knights Hospitaller; 1202–1206 | Succeeded by Geoffroy le Rat |
