= Gerard of Avesnes =

Gerard of Avesnes-sur-Helpe (died 17 May 1102) was a Flemish knight from Hainaut who participated in the First Crusade in the army of Godfrey of Bouillon. He is primarily known for a dramatic incident during the Siege of Arsuf in late 1099.

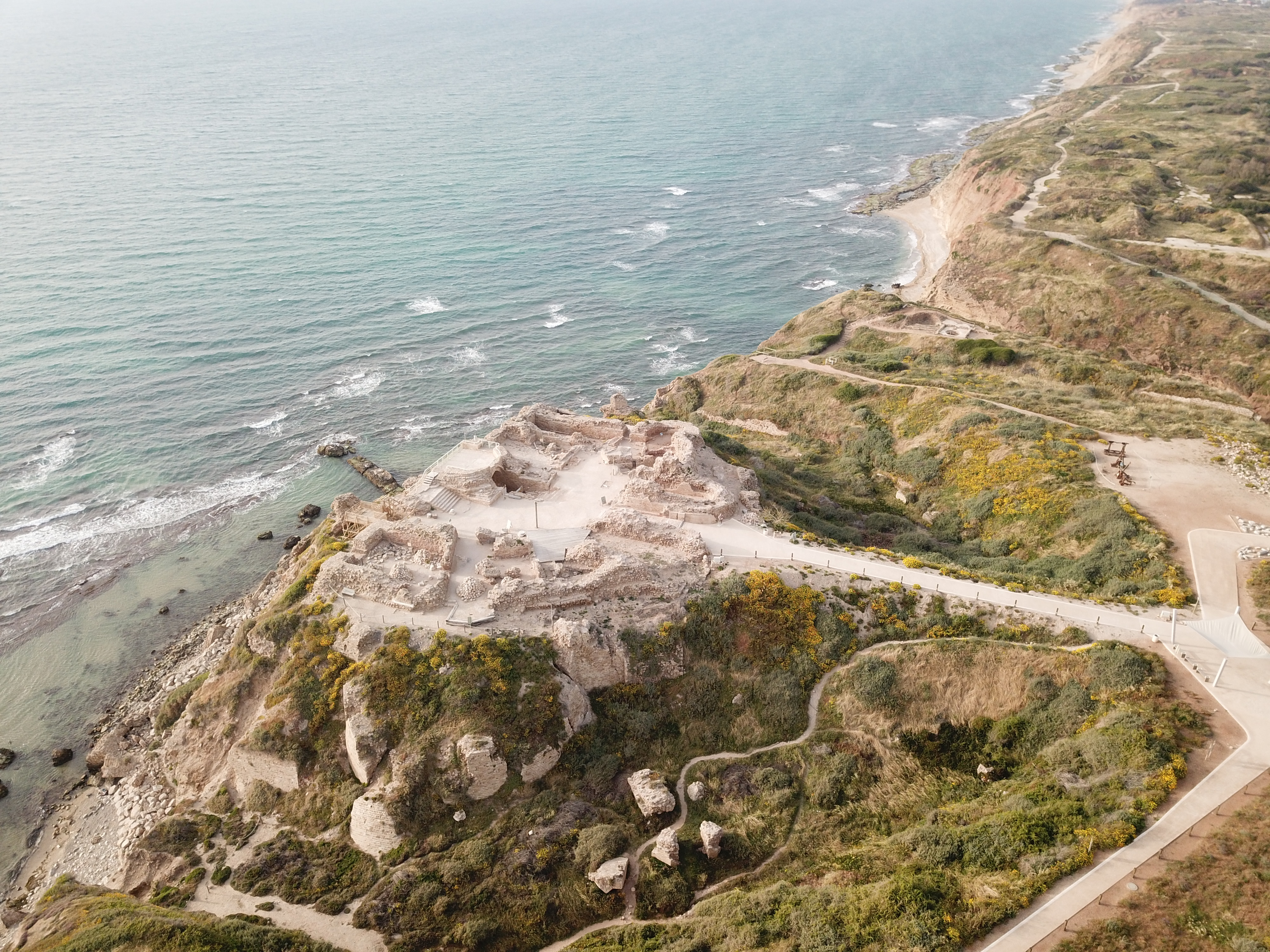
Aerial view of the castle at Arsuf

== Biography ==
Hailing from Avesnes-sur-Helpe, Gerard was a knight and vassal of Baldwin II of Hainaut in the First Crusade, travelling with Godfrey's contingent. During the Siege of Antioch in 1098, Baldwin and Hugh of Vermandois were sent back to Constantinople to plead for Byzantine reinforcements. En route in Anatolia, Baldwin vanished, presumably taken by a Seljuk raiding party. Gerard then became a vassal of Godfrey's.

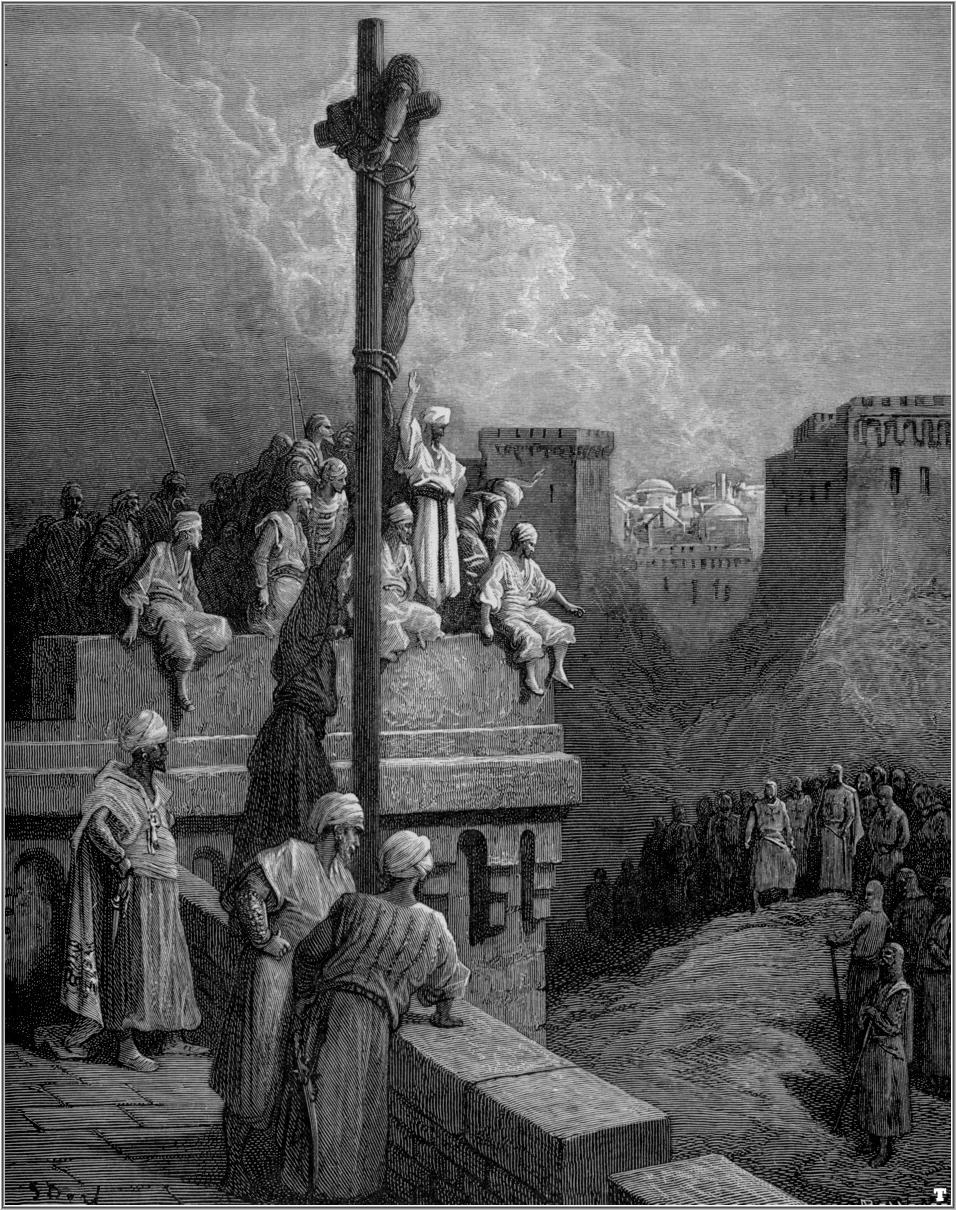
Illustration depicting Gerard of Avesnes exposed on the walls of Arsuf, by Gustave Doré (1877)

In the fall of 1099, Godfrey's only passage from Jerusalem to the Mediterranean Sea was through a narrow corridor to the port of Jaffa, and he wished to expand that avenue. The offer made by the residents of the small town of Arsuf to surrender to Raymond of Saint-Gilles was rejected by Godfrey. Instead, a tribute was to be paid by Arsuf, accompanied by an exchange of hostages. Gerard was amongst the Franks sent to the city.

Not satisfied with the arrangement, Godfrey marched on Arsuf with a small force in late October 1099. Thus began the Siege of Arsuf. The Franks catapults and siege towers were useless against the walls of the city. They were soon destroyed by the Muslim garrison's Greek fire.

Amidst the fighting, the Arsuf defenders bound Gerard to a mast of an abandoned ship and hoisted him for the Franks to see. Gerard pleaded with Godfrey to spare him and call off the siege, but to no avail. Pierced by a dozen of the Frank's arrows, he was pulled back into to town. Godfrey called off the siege on 15 December 1099.

Despite being severely wounded, Gerard miraculously survived the assault. The garrison nursed him back to health and later released him as part of a peace agreement when the siege was lifted. He later was granted the Lordship of Hebron.

Gerard continued serving the kingdom and was later killed in battle at the Second Battle of Ramla in May 1102.

== Bibliography ==
- Fink, Harold S. (1969). "The Foundation of the Latin States, 1099–1118" (PDF). The First Hundred Years. pp. 368–409. Archived from the original (PDF) on 2023-01-04.
- John, Simon A. (2018). Godfrey of Bouillon: Duke of Lower Lotharingia, Ruler of Latin Jerusalem, C. 1060-1100. Taylor & Francis Group. ISBN 9781472458964.
- Riley-Smith, Jonathan (1997). The First Crusaders, 1095–1131. Cambridge University Press. ISBN 9780521646031.
- Runciman, Steven (1951). A History of the Crusades, Volume One: The First Crusade and the Foundation of the Kingdom of Jerusalem. Cambridge University Press. ISBN 9780521347709.
- Runciman, Steven (1952). A History of the Crusades, Volume Two: The Kingdom of Jerusalem and the Frankish East, 1100–1187. Cambridge University Press. ISBN 9780521347716.
