= Geoffroy de Donjon =

11th Grand Master of the Knights Hospitaller (1193–1202)

Geoffrey de Donjon

Grand Masters of the Knights Hospitaller
- In office 1193–1202
- Preceded by: Garnier de Nablus
- Succeeded by: Fernando Afonso of Portugal

Personal details
- Died: 1202 Acre, Kingdom of Jerusalem

Geoffroy de Donjon (died 1202 in Acre), also known as Geoffroy de Duisson, was the grand master of the Knights Hospitaller serving from 1193 through his death in 1202. He succeeded Garnier de Nablus who died in August 1192.

== Biography ==
It is not known if Geoffroy was from Picardie or Auvergne. His name is first mentioned for the first time in an act of April 1185 where he appears as a simple brother in the Holy Land, arriving with the crusaders some time before that date. The second time was when he was elected grand master at the general chapter meeting held in Margat in January 1193.

A letter from him, undated, speaks of an earthquake in Syria. This event has been since identified as the 1202 Syrian earthquake happening in 20 May of that year. He was certainly present during the summer of 1202 at the side of the papal legate Soffredo Gaetani during the first trip to Antioch. They were attempting to reconcile the parties in the War of the Antiochene Succession concerning the Principality of Antioch. On 23 March 1203, the second voyage of Soffredo Gaetani to Antioch took place, but without Geoffroy de Donjon. He was replaced ad interim by the Grand Commander Pierre de Mirmande. They were accompanied by Philippe du Plessis, Grand Master of the Templars. These elements make it possible to situate the disappearance of Geoffroy between these two diplomatic trips.

His magisterium took place during a relatively calm period in the Holy Land. There were many disputes with the Templars, as the orders were jealous of each other. Under Geoffroy, several agreements were concluded. The independence of the Teutonic Order is such an arrangement. For a long time they had benefited from the kindness of the Hospitaller order, but the Teutonics wanted to acquire their independence. They had taken the rule of the Temple for clerics and knights and that of the Hospitaller for their own rules of hospitality. The Grand Masters of the Hospitallers and Templars attended the solemn ceremony, obliged by the circumstances, on 5 March 1198, curbing their pride and in the silence of their reprobation.

Geoffroy de Donjon increased the possessions of the Hospitallers by adding on 24 October 1197 the Casalia Hautefié which belonged to Juliana Grenier and her second husband Aymar de Lairon, the Lady and Lord of Caesarea. Aymar later became a brother in the Order, and Juliana was buried in a Hospitaller cemetery. They also obtained the castle of Digegie in May 1201 which belonged to Christine and Rohard of Jaffa. Geoffroy was succeeded by Fernado Afonso of Portugal.

== See also ==
- Cartulaire général de l'Ordre des Hospitaliers
- List of Knights Hospitaller sites
- Langue (Knights Hospitaller)
- Flags of the Knights Hospitaller

== Bibliography ==
- Barber, Malcolm (2012). The New Knighthood. A History of the Order of the Temple. Cambridge University Press. ISBN 978-1107604735.
- Bronstein, Judith (2005). The Hospitallers and the Holy Land: Financing the Latin East, 1187-1274. Boydell Press. ISBN 9781843831310.
- Delaville Le Roulx, Joseph (1904). Les Hospitaliers en Terre Sainte et à Chypre (1100-1310). E. Leroux, Paris.
- Demurger, Alain (2013). Les Hospitaliers, De Jérusalem à Rhodes 1050-1317. Tallandier, Paris. ISBN 979-1021000605.
- Flavigny, Bertrand Galimard (2006). Histoire de l'ordre de Malte. Perrin, Paris. ISBN 978-2262021153.
- Harot, Eugène (1911). Essai d'armorial des grands maîtres de l'Ordre de Saint-Jean de Jérusalem. Collegio araldico.
- Josserand, Philippe (2009). Prier et combattre, Dictionnaire européen des ordres militaires au Moyen Âge. Fayard, Paris. ISBN 978-2213627205.
- Lock, Peter (2006). The Routledge Companion to the Crusades. Routledge. doi:10.4324/9780203389638. ISBN 0-415-39312-4.
- Murray, Alan V. (2006). The Crusades—An Encyclopedia. ABC-CLIO. ISBN 978-1-57607-862-4.
- Nicholson, Helen J. (2001). The Knights Hospitaller. Boydell & Brewer. ISBN 978-1843830382.
- Runciman, Steven (1952). A History of the Crusades, Volume Two: The Kingdom of Jerusalem and the Frankish East, 1100-1187. Cambridge University Press. ISBN 9780521347716.
- Runciman, Steven (1954). A History of the Crusades, Volume Three: The Kingdom of Acre and the Later Crusades. Cambridge University Press. ISBN 9780521347723.
- Setton, Kenneth M. (1969). A History of the Crusades. University of Wisconsin Press.
- Tyerman, Christopher (2006). God's War: A New History of the Crusades. Belknap Press. ISBN 978-0-674-02387-1.
- Vann, Theresa M. (2006). Order of the Hospital. The Crusades––An Encyclopedia, pp. 598–605.

Preceded by Garnier de Nablus	Grand Master of the Knights Hospitaller; 1193–1202	Succeeded by Pierre de Mirmande
