= Pierre de Mirmande =

Pierre de Mirmande (fl. 1163–1203) was a French nobleman of the Order of Saint-John of Jerusalem from the end of the 12th century to the beginning of the 13th century. He served as interim Grand Master of the Knights Hospitaller after the death of Geoffroy de Donjon in 1202. He was replaced by Fernando Afonso of Portugal who became Grand Master in 1202.

== Early life ==
Before his entrance in the Order, Pierre de Mirmande was the Lord of Mirmande, near the village of Saint-Jean-Lachalm in the French department of Haute-Loire. He was married to a woman named Guillemette, and they had two sons Odon and Etienne. The French historian Augustin Chassaing wrote about Mirmande: "This is an interesting and very rare chance to meet the starting point in the West of an Hospitaller, called to command, thirty years later in the East, one of the most important places of war of the order."

== Career ==
The first mention of Pierre de Mirmande is in a charter dating from May 1163 when he entered the Order at the Saint John's commandery of Le Puy-en-Velay. We find him as a brother in 1184 in Saint-Jean-d'Acre under the magisterium of Roger de Moulins. According to acts of January 1193 and September 1199, he was Châtelain of the Krac des Chevaliers under the magisterium of Geoffroy de Donjon, elected around January 1193.

On 4 March 1202, De Mirmande was the Grand Commander of the Order, still under the magisterium of de Donjon who disappeared after the summer of 1202. The new grand master would be Fernando Afonso of Portugal, elected between the fall of 1202 and 1203. De Mirmande became the Grand Master ad interim and directed the Order in the East in his absence. Fernando Afonso joined his post during the year 1203.

It's in this context that on 23 March 1203, Pierre de Mirmande left on a diplomatic mission alongside Philippe du Plessis, Grand Master of the Knights Templar and Soffredo Gaetani, legate of pope Innocent III. All three attempted mediation to resolve the war of succession between Bohemond IV and Raymond-Roupen concerning the Principality of Antioch.

== See also ==
- Cartulaire général de l'Ordre des Hospitaliers
- List of Knights Hospitaller sites
- Langue (Knights Hospitaller)
- Flags of the Knights Hospitaller

== Bibliography ==
- Barber, Malcolm (2012). The New Knighthood. A History of the Order of the Temple. Cambridge University Press. ISBN 978-1107604735.
- Bronstein, Judith (2005). The Hospitallers and the Holy Land: Financing the Latin East, 1187-1274. Boydell Press. ISBN 9781843831310.
- Chassaing, Augustin (1888). Cartulaire des hospitaliers (Ordre de saint-Jean de Jérusalem) du Velay. Alphonse Picard, Paris.
- Claverie, Pierre-Vincent (2005). L'ordre du Temple en Terre Sainte et à Chypre au XIIIe siècle. Nicosia: Centre de Recherche Scientifique. ISBN 9789963080946.
- Delaville Le Roulx, Joseph (1895). Inventaire des pièces de Terre-Sainte de l'ordre de l'Hôpital. Revue de l'Orient Latin, Tome III. pp. 12 v.
- Delaville Le Roulx, Joseph (1904). Les Hospitaliers en Terre Sainte et à Chypre (1100-1310). E. Leroux, Paris.
- Demurger, Alain (2013). Les Hospitaliers, De Jérusalem à Rhodes 1050-1317. Tallandier, Paris. ISBN 979-1021000605.
- Flavigny, Bertrand Galimard (2006). Histoire de l'ordre de Malte. Perrin, Paris. ISBN 978-2262021153.
- Harot, Eugène (1911). Essai d'armorial des grands maîtres de l'Ordre de Saint-Jean de Jérusalem. Collegio araldico.
- Josserand, Philippe (2009). Prier et combattre, Dictionnaire européen des ordres militaires au Moyen Âge. Fayard, Paris. ISBN 978-2213627205.
- Lock, Peter (2006). The Routledge Companion to the Crusades. Routledge. doi:10.4324/9780203389638. ISBN 0-415-39312-4.
- Murray, Alan V. (2006). The Crusades—An Encyclopedia. ABC-CLIO. ISBN 978-1-57607-862-4. Archived from the original on 2023-03-26.
- Nicholson, Helen J. (2001). The Knights Hospitaller. Boydell & Brewer. ISBN 978-1843830382.
- Runciman, Steven (1952). A History of the Crusades, Volume Two: The Kingdom of Jerusalem and the Frankish East, 1100-1187. Cambridge University Press. ISBN 9780521347716.
- Runciman, Steven (1954). A History of the Crusades, Volume Three: The Kingdom of Acre and the Later Crusades. Cambridge University Press. ISBN 9780521347723.
- Setton, Kenneth M. (1969). A History of the Crusades. University of Wisconsin Press.
- Tyerman, Christopher (2006). God's War: A New History of the Crusades. Belknap Press. ISBN 978-0-674-02387-1.
- Vann, Theresa M. (2006). Order of the Hospital. The Crusades––An Encyclopedia, pp. 598–605.

Preceded by Geoffroy de Donjon	Grand Master of the Knights Hospitaller; 1202–1202	Succeeded by Fernando Afonso of Portugal
