= Igreja de São João de Alporão =

Church building in Santarém, Portugal

Coordinates: 39.235578°N 8.680058°W

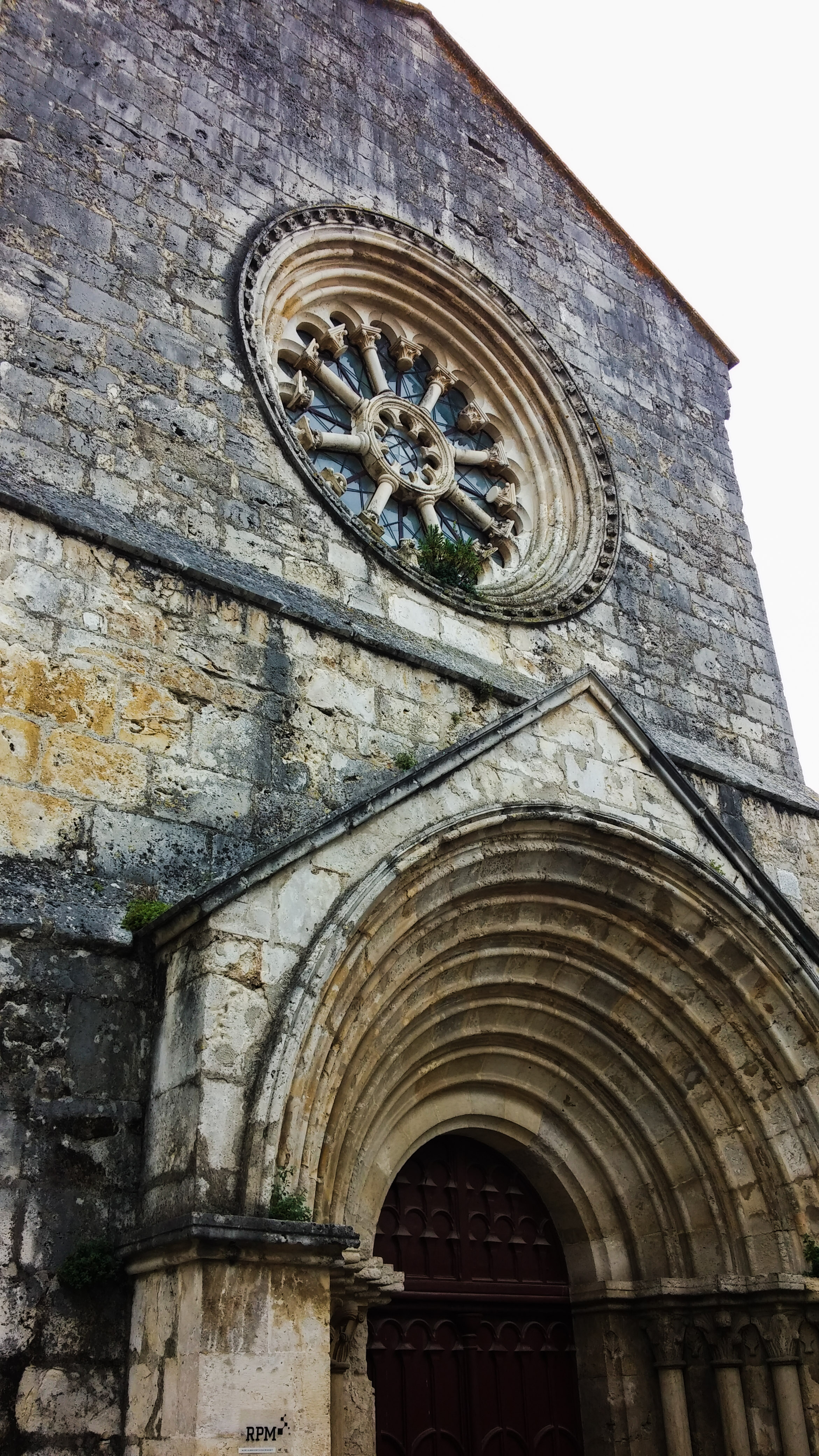
Igreja São João do Alporão

Igreja de São João de Alporão is a church in Santarém, Portugal. It is classified as a National Monument.
