= Ar Ramlah =

Coordinates: 16.03707°N 49.00819°E

- Interactive map of Ar Ramlah
- Country: Yemen
- Governorate: Hadhramaut
- Time zone: UTC+3 (Yemen Standard Time)

Ar Ramlah is a village in eastern Yemen. It is located in the Hadhramaut Governorate.
