= Apollonia–Arsuf =

Ancient city in Tel Aviv District, Israel

- Ἀπολλωνία (Ancient Greek); Σώζουσα (Ancient Greek) אפולוניה (Hebrew) أرْسُوف (Arabic); Arsur (Latin)
- Arsur
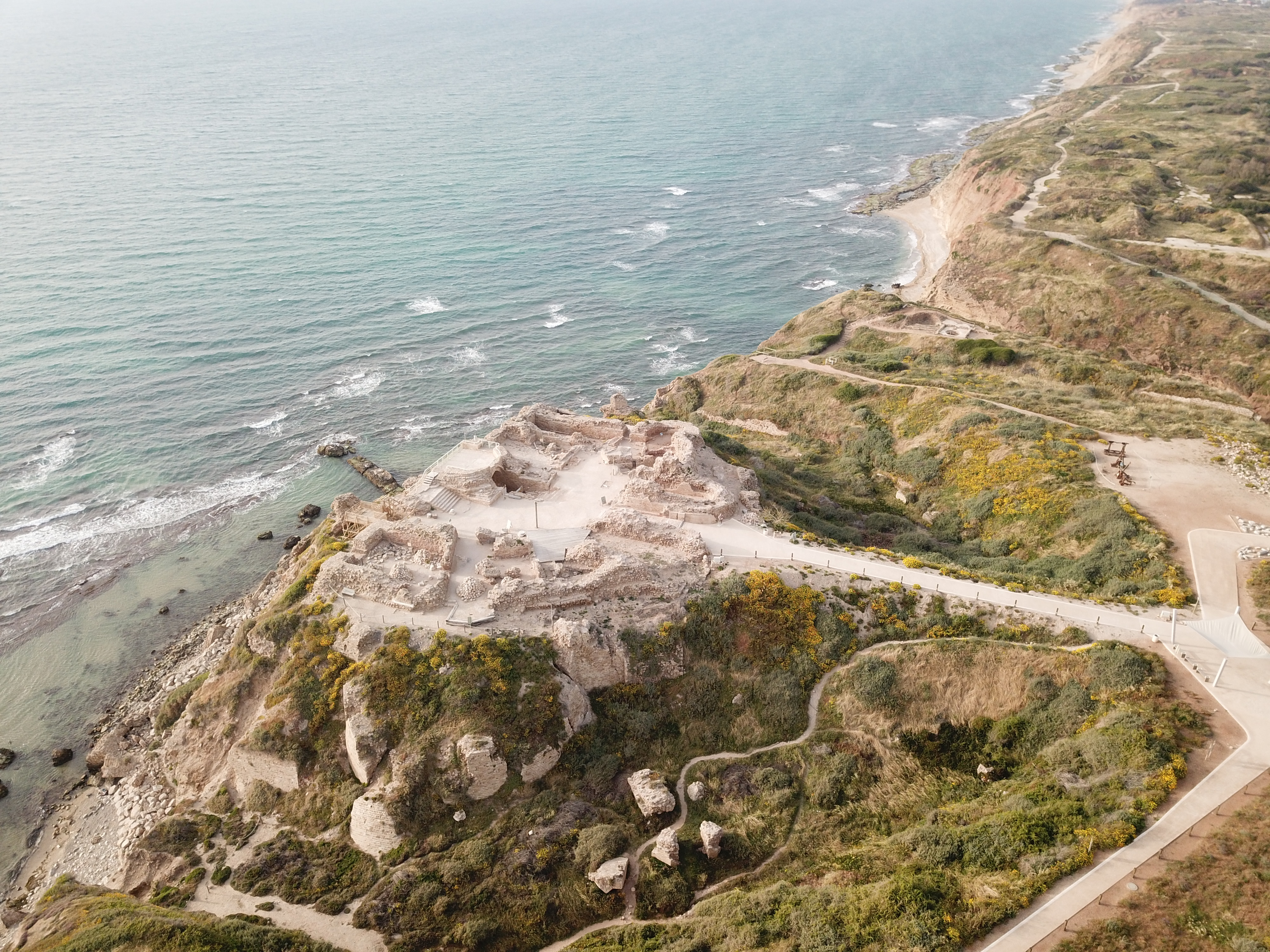
- An aerial view of the Crusader castle and anchorage

- Location within Central Israel
- 32°11′43″N 34°48′24″E
- Type: Lowland castle (for the city citadel)
- Periods: Mainly Early Islamic and Crusader periods
- Associated with: Baldwin I of Jerusalem -1101; Baibars, Mameluk sultan - 1265
- Location: Herzliya Pituah, Israel
- Grid position: 132/178 PAL

History
- Abandoned: 1265
- Event(s): First siege by Godfrey of Bouillon - 1099; Battle of Arsuf - 1191 - between Saladin and Richard the Lionheart

Site notes
- Condition: Ruin
- Public access: Yes, national park

Apollonia (Ancient Greek: Ἀπολλωνία; Hebrew: אפולוניה), known in the Early Islamic period as Arsuf (Arabic: أرْسُوف, romanized: Arsūf) and in the Crusader Kingdom of Jerusalem as Arsur, was an ancient city on the Mediterranean coast of today's Israel. In Israeli archaeology it is known as Tel Arshaf (תֵּל אַרְשָׁף). Founded by the Phoenicians during the Persian period in the late sixth century BCE, it was inhabited continuously until the Crusader period, through the Hellenistic, Roman, and Byzantine periods, during the latter being renamed to Sozusa (Ancient Greek: Σώζουσα, or Sozusa in Palaestina to differentiate it from Sozusa in Libya). It was situated on a sandy area ending towards the sea with a cliff, about 34 kilometres (21 mi) south of Caesarea.

It fell to the Muslims in 640, was fortified against Byzantine attacks and became known as Arsuf. In 1101 it was conquered by the Crusader Kingdom of Jerusalem, and was a strategically important stronghold in the Third Crusade, during which the Battle of Arsuf (1191) was fought nearby. The fortified city and the castle fell to the Mamluks in 1265, when both were completely destroyed.

The site of Arsuf (also Apollonia–Arsuf אַפּוֹלוֹנְיָה-אַרְסוּף) is now in Herzliya municipality, Israel (just north of Tel Aviv). The site was intensively excavated from 1994. In 2002 Apollonia National Park was opened to the public.

== Names ==
The city is first recorded under its Greek name Apollonia in the final decades of the Persian period (mid-4th century BCE). In a long-standing suggestion, first proposed by Clermont-Ganneau in 1876, it was assumed that the Greek name was given due to the interpretatio graeca of the Canaanite deity Resheph (ršp) as Apollo (as god of the plague), suggesting that the settlement would originally have been a "Phoenician" foundation. The Semitic name ršp would then have been "restored" in the medieval Arabic toponym of Arsūf. There is indeed no archaeological evidence for a settlement prior to the Persian period, and Izre'el (1999) upholds this identification, suggesting that the Semitic name might have been preserved by the Aramaic-speaking Samaritan community. The Samaritan chronicle of Abu l-Fath (14th century, written in Arabic) records a toponym rʿšfyn (with ayin). Izre'el (1999) considers the possibility of identifying this toponym with the Arabic Arsūf, assuming that the ayin may derive from a mater lectionis used in Samaritan Aramaic orthography.

A tradition connecting the name with the biblical Resheph, a grandson of Ephraim, is spurious.

The name of the nearby Israeli settlement of Rishpon was given in 1936, inspired by a misreading of an inscription of Tiglath-Pileser III, where *rašpūna was read for kašpūna; recognition of the misreading rendered void the identification of Arsuf with a supposed Iron Age Phoenician settlement of *Rašpūna.

The renaming of Apollonia "city of Apollo" to Sozusa (Σώζουσα Sōzousa) "city of the Saviour" took place in the Byzantine period, under the influence of Christianity as the state religion, motivated by Soter (Σωτήρ) "savior" being a byname of Apollo as well as of Christ. The renaming is paralleled in at least three other cities called Apollonia: Sozusa in Cyrenaica, Sozopolis in Pisidia and Sozopolis in Thrace. The identification of ancient Apollonia with Byzantine-era Sozusa is due to Stark (1852), that of medieval Arsuf with Apollonia/Sozusa to Clermont-Ganneau (1876).

The site is variously referred to as Apollonia, Arsin, Arsuf, Arsuph, Arsur, Arsuth, Assur, Orsuf and Sozusa in Crusader-era documents, with a large dominance of "Arsur" among the secondary sources discussed by Schmidt.

An Umayyad lead bulla discovered at Arsuf bears the inscription “seal of the district of Qaysārīyah” on one side and “city of Arsūf” on the other, providing the earliest known epigraphic attestation in Arabic of the name Arsūf.Arsūf was subordinate to Kūrat Qaysārīyah in the early Islamic period.

== History ==
=== Antiquity ===
Although some Chalcolithic and Iron Age remains were uncovered at the site, there is no evidence that there was a settlement prior to the Persian period (ca. 500 BCE). While the importance of the town was overshadowed by both Jaffa and Caesarea, Apollonia developed into a regional center after the decline of its neighbouring site at Tel Michal in the Late Persian period, and was likely the main city and harbour in the southern Sharon Plain by the mid-4th century BCE. It is mentioned in the Periplus of Pseudo-Scylax.

During the Hellenistic period it was a port town ruled by the Seleucids.

Under Roman rule, the town prospered and grew into the chief commercial and industrial centre of the region between the Poleg and Yarkon rivers. In 113 CE, Apollonia was partially destroyed by an earthquake, but recovered quickly.

Apollonia is mentioned by Pliny, Hist. nat., V, 14, and Ptolemy, V, xv, 2, between Cæsarea and Joppa, and by other ancient authors, including Josephus, Ant. jud., XIII, xv, 4, Appianus, Hist. rom. Syr., 57. The Roman proconsul, Gabinius, found it ruined in 57 BCE, and had it rebuilt (Josephus, Bel. jud., I, viii, 4). Apollonia is depicted in the Tabula Peutingeriana, on the coastal highway between Joppa and Caesarea, at the distance of 22 miles from Caesarea, confirming the identification of Arsuf with Apollonia.

There was no coin minting in Apollonia, confirming that the town did not have the role of a Roman provincial center but was rather considered a medium-sized coastal town like Jamnia and Azotus.

Sozusa in Palaestina was the name of the city in the late Roman province of Palaestina Prima, and its episcopal see was a suffragan of Caesarea, the provincial capital. The name had changed from Apollonia to Sozusa before 449, when Bishop Baruchius signed the acts of the Robber Council of Ephesus with this title. The name Sozusa also occurs in the works of the Byzantine geographers Hierocles and George of Cyprus. Apart from Baruchius of 449, the names of two more of its bishops, Leontius in 518, and Damianus in 553, are also known. The death of patriarch Modestus in 630 in the city is recorded in both Georgian and Arabic texts, the Georgian texts using Sozos (for Sozusa) and the Arabic texts Arsuf, suggesting that both names remained in use for some time in the early medieval period.

During the Byzantine–Sasanian War of 602–628, the city surrendered on terms in 614 to Shahrbaraz and was in Sasanian hands until near the end of the war.

=== Early Muslim period ===
In 640, the town fell to the Muslims. The Arabic name Arsuf or Ursuf occurs in works of Arab geographers from the 10th century, e.g. Al-Muqaddasi said it was "smaller than Yafah, but strongly fortified and populous There is here a beautiful pulpit, made in the first instance for the Mosque of Ar Ramlah, but which being found too small, was given to Arsuf".

At the time of the Muslim conquest, Sozusa was inhabited by Samaritans. In 809, following the death of Harun al-Rashid, the local Samaritan community was destroyed and their synagogue ruined. In 809 the Abbasids violently removed the large group of Samaritans that had been living in the city.

The town's area decreased to about 22 acres (89,000 m^{2}) and, for the first time, it was surrounded by a fortified wall with buttresses, to resist the constant attacks of Byzantine fleets from the sea.

=== Crusader to Mamluk period ===
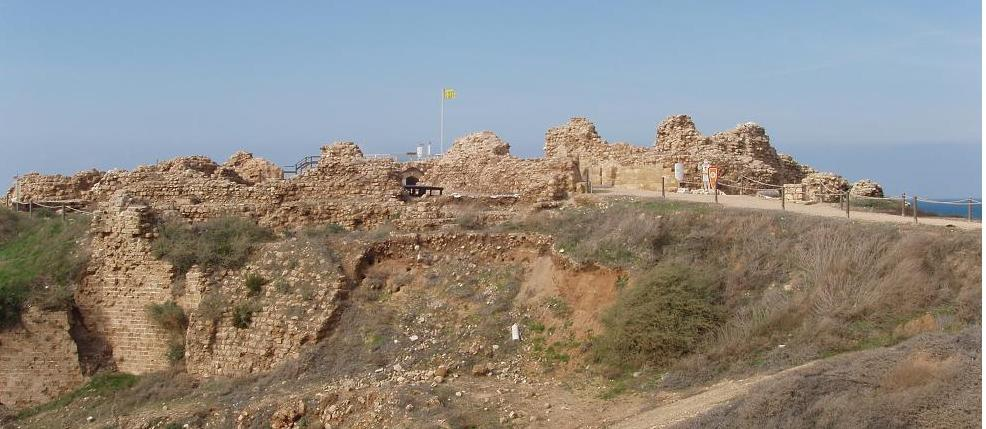
Remains of the castle

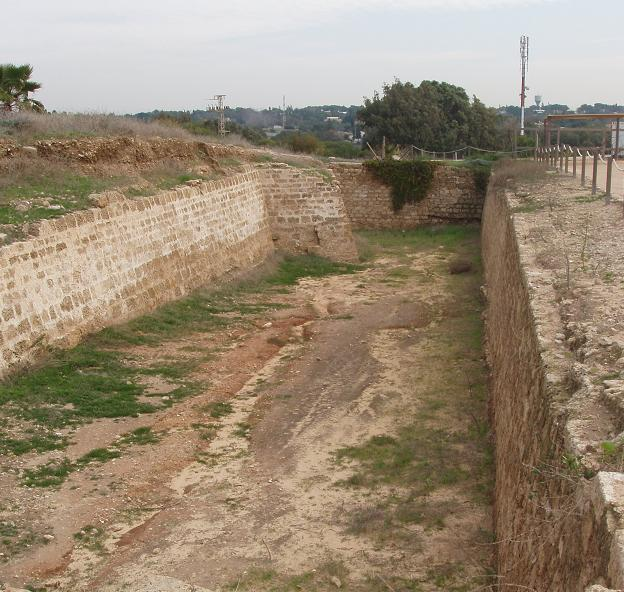
The dry moat of the castle

Godfrey de Bouillon attempted to capture it, but failed for want of ships (William of Tyre, IX, x). King Baldwin I took it in 1102, after a siege by land and sea, allowing the inhabitants to withdraw to Ascalon. The Crusaders, who called it Arsur, rebuilt the city's walls and created the Lordship of Arsur in the Kingdom of Jerusalem. In 1187 Arsuf was recaptured by the Muslims, but fell again to the Crusaders on 7 September 1191 after the Battle of Arsuf, fought between the forces of Richard I of England and Saladin.

John of Ibelin, Lord of Beirut became Lord of Arsuf in 1207 when he married Melisende of Arsuf. Their son John of Arsuf (d. 1258) inherited the title. The title then passed to John of Arsuf's eldest son Balian of Arsuf (d. 1277). He built new walls, the large castle and new harbor in 1241. In 1251 Louis IX of France re-erected its ramparts. From 1261, the city was ruled by the Knights Hospitaller.

In 1225, Yakut wrote: "Arsuf remained in Muslim hands till taken by Kund Furi [Godfrey of Bouillon], lord of Jerusalem, in the year 494 [ AH 494, i.e. 1101 CE], and it is in the hand of the Franks [Crusaders] at the present day."

In 1265, sultan Baibars, ruler of the Mamluks, captured Arsuf after 40 days of siege, after almost getting killed in the moat by a sortie of the defenders. The inhabitants were killed or sold as slaves and the town completely razed. The destruction was so complete that the site was abandoned and never regained its urban character – in the 14th century the geographer Abulfeda said it contained no inhabitants ("Tabula Syriæ", 82).

According to Mujir al-Din (writing c. 1496), the Sidna Ali Mosque just south of Arsuf was dedicated by Baibars at the site of a saint's tomb where he prayed for victory prior to retaking Arsuf.

In the Middle Ages, Sozusa was confused with Antipatris. The identity of Arsuf with ancient Apollonia was first noted by Clermont-Ganneau in 1876.

=== Ottoman period ===
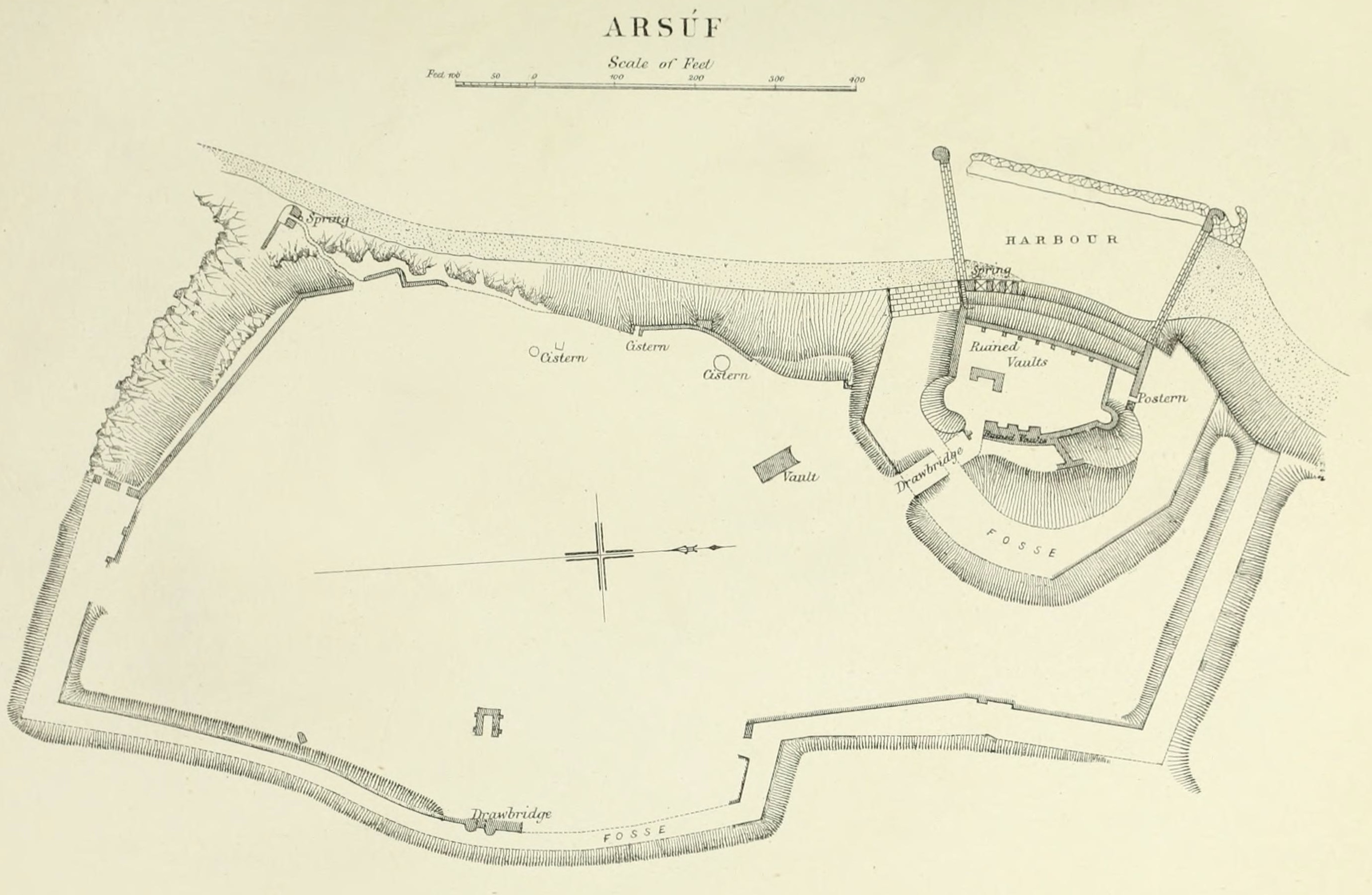
Arsuf from the 1871–77 PEF Survey of Palestine

In 1596, Ottoman tax registers recorded a village called Arsuf with 22 families and 4 bachelors, all Muslims. The villagers paid a total of 2,900 akçe in taxes. 1/3 the revenue went to a waqf: Hadrat 'Ali bin 'Ulaym. It appeared, just named "village" on the map that Pierre Jacotin compiled during Napoleon's invasion of 1799.

=== Catholic titular see until 1965 ===
Sozusa in Palaestina is listed as a titular see in the 2013 Annuario Pontificio. Due to the confusion with the other ancient city in classical Palestine known as Apollonia, it was also assigned under the name Antipatris. Its last titular bishop of the Latin Church was Francis Joseph McSorley, the Apostolic Vicar of Jolo (d. 1970). It has no longer been assigned since, in accordance with the practice established after the Second Vatican Council regarding all titular sees situated in what were the eastern patriarchates.

=== British Mandate and Israeli periods ===
The site was incorporated in Herzliya municipality in 1924. At the time, a village called al-Haram existed adjacent to the ruins, but it was depopulated during the 1948 Nakba, and the area south of the site was built up as the Shikun Olim (שיכון עולים "immigrant housing") district of Herzeliya in the 1950s.

Rishpon was established in 1936 to the immediate north-east of the site. It is part of the Hof HaSharon Regional Council, Central District.

Arsuf is a modern "exclusive clifftop community" named for Arsuf, built in 1995 north of the site, in Hof HaSharon Regional Council.

== Archaeology ==
The site of Apollonia–Arsuf was excavated in the 1990s and opened for visitors as Apollonia National Park in 2002. Excavations were ongoing as of 2015. The excavation report is prepared in three volumes, of which the first was published in 1999. The second and third volume, covering the excavation seasons until 2015, were in preparation as of 2016.

The above-ground remains before the excavations included the medieval city wall and moat, enclosing an area of about 90 dunam, a Crusader castle with a double-wall system with an area of about 4 dunam, a port with built jetties and a sheltered anchorage, protected by a sandstone reef.

Large amounts of pottery were recovered in the area surrounding the city, mostly of the Byzantine and early Islamic period, indicating that the city extended significantly beyond its old walls in the 7th century. A large Roman-era villa maritima was uncovered to the south of the site.

== See also ==
- List of ancient Greek cities
- Tel Michal
- Via Maris

Crusader period:

- Vassals of the Kingdom of Jerusalem
  - Lord of Arsuf
- Battle of Arsuf (1191)

== Bibliography ==
- Boas, Adrian (2006), Archaeology of the Military Orders: A Survey of the Urban Centres, Rural Settlements and Castles of the Military Orders in the Latin East (c.1120–1291), Routledge, ISBN 9781134422845.
- Chisholm, Hugh, ed. (1911). "Arsuf" . Encyclopædia Britannica (11th ed.). Cambridge University Press.
- Hütteroth, W.-D.; Abdulfattah, K. (1977). Historical Geography of Palestine, Transjordan and Southern Syria in the Late 16th Century. Erlanger Geographische Arbeiten, Sonderband 5. Erlangen, Germany: Vorstand der Fränkischen Geographischen Gesellschaft. ISBN 3-920405-41-2.
- Karmon, Y. (1960). "An Analysis of Jacotin's Map of Palestine" (PDF). Israel Exploration Journal. 10 (3, 4): 155–173, 244–253. Archived from the original (PDF) on 2019-12-22.
- Le Strange, G. (1890). Palestine Under the Moslems: A Description of Syria and the Holy Land from A.D. 650 to 1500. London: Committee of the Palestine Exploration Fund. OCLC 1004386.
- Robinson, E.; Smith, E. (1841). Biblical Researches in Palestine, Mount Sinai and Arabia Petraea: A Journal of Travels in the year 1838. Vol. 3. Boston: Crocker & Brewster. (pp. 46-47; 2nd appendix, p. 128)
- Roll, Israel; Tal, Oren (1999), Apollonia-Arsuf : final report of the excavations, the Persian and Hellenistic periods, with appendices on the Chalcolithic and iron age II remains, Emery and Claire Yass Publications in Archaeology, ISBN 965-266-012-4
- Roll, I. and Tal, O. (eds.) Apollonia-Arsuf: Final Report of the Excavations. Volume I: The Persian and Hellenistic Periods (with Appendices on the Chalcolithic and Iron Age II Remains), Tel Aviv University, Monograph Series of the Institute of Archaeology 16, Tel Aviv (1999).
- Sharon, M. (1997). Corpus Inscriptionum Arabicarum Palaestinae, Vol. I, A. BRILL. ISBN 90-04-10833-5. (see p.114)
- Tal, O. (ed.), Apollonia-Arsuf: Final Report of the Excavations. Volume II: Excavations in the Hinterland of Apollonia-Arsuf (1996, 2012, 2013) [in preparation]
- Tal, O. and Scholkmann, B. (eds.), Final Report of the Excavations. Volume III: Crusader Arsur. Excavations Directed by I. Roll (1977–2006) and O. Tal (2006–2015) (in preparation).
- This article incorporates text from a publication now in the public domain: Herbermann, Charles, ed. (1913). "Sozusa". Catholic Encyclopedia. New York: Robert Appleton Company.
- Shlomo Izre'el, "Arsuf: The Semitic Name of Apollonia" in: Apollonia-Arsuf: Final Report of the Excavations Volume I, The Emery and Claire Yass Publications in Archaeology, Monograph Series of the Institute of Archaeology of Tel Aviv University No. 16, Tel Aviv (1999).
