= Itinerarium Regis Ricardi =

Literary work

The Itinerarium Regis Ricardi (in full, Itinerarium Peregrinorum et Gesta Regis Ricardi) is a Latin prose narrative of the Third Crusade, 1189–1192. The first part of the book concentrates on Saladin's conquests and the early stages of the crusade, with a long description of the expedition of the Emperor Frederick Barbarossa. The rest of the book describes King Richard I of England's participation in the crusade.

The Itinerarium was formerly attributed to Geoffrey de Vinsauf, and was said to be a first-hand narrative. In fact, it was apparently compiled by Richard de Templo, a canon of Holy Trinity, London, in the early 1220s, on the basis of at least two lost contemporary memoirs. The first part is similar to the so-called Latin Continuation of William of Tyre, which seems to be a reworked version of the Itinerarium . The second part, in particular, is closely related to an Anglo-Norman poem on the same subject, Ambroise's L'Estoire de la Guerre Sainte. It is not clear whether or not Richard de Templo went on the Third Crusade, but some of the differences between his text and Ambroise's Estoire indicate that he was writing from first-hand knowledge.

William Stubbs's edition of the Itinerarium (Rolls Series, 1864) appeared before the manuscript of Ambroise's poem was discovered. Hans E. Mayer published an edition of an earlier version of the text in 1962, and Helen J. Nicholson translated Stubbs's edition in 1997.

Scholars have offered different views as to the date in which the book was composed. Some scholars have argued it was over the period 1194–1201 while others say it was later, approximately 1216–1222.

== Editions ==
- William Stubbs (ed.), Itinerarium Peregrinorum et Gesta Regis Ricardi (1864), available at Google Books.
- Hans E. Mayer, Das Itinerarium Peregrinorum. Eine zeitgenössische englische Chronik zum dritten Kreuzzug in ursprünglicher Gestalt. Stuttgart: Anton Hiersemann, 1962.
- Helen J. Nicholson, The Chronicle of the Third Crusade: The Itinerarium Peregrinorum et Gesta Regis Ricardi. Aldershot: Ashgate, 1997.
- Anon. translation, Itinerary of Richard I and others to the Holy Land (Cambridge, Ontario, 2001) (pdf)

== Extracts ==
In his book "A Knight in Battle", R Ewart Oakeshott includes several passages from the Itinerarium, quoting its author's descriptions of the "Turk" tactics while harassing or attacking the Crusader forces when they were leaving Acre and on their route march from there.
