= Cathedral of the Holy Cross, Acre =

Cathedral of the Holy Cross
- Cathedral of the Holy Cross
- 32°55′21.74″N 35°4′13.13″E
- Location: Acre
- Denomination: Catholic (Latin)
- Tradition: Christianity

History
- Founded: 12th century
- Dedication: Holy Cross

Architecture
- Functional status: Destroyed
- Demolished: 1291 (Fall of Acre)

Administration
- Diocese: Latin Catholic Diocese of Acre

The Cathedral of the Holy Cross was the main Latin cathedral of the Diocese of Acre in the Kingdom of Jerusalem. It stood in the medieval city of Acre until the fall of the Crusader presence in 1291. In 1781, the El-Jazzar Mosque was constructed on or near the site traditionally identified with the former cathedral.

== History ==
After the Crusaders captured Acre in 1104, the city became a major stronghold of the Kingdom of Jerusalem. The Latin Diocese of Acre was established, and the cathedral was dedicated to the Holy Cross, adjacent to the Hospitaller commandery of Saint-Jean-d'Acre. William of Tyre is recorded as having become a canon of the cathedral after his return to the Holy Land in 1165.

Following the fall of Jerusalem to Saladin in 1187, Acre grew into the de facto capital of the remaining Crusader state, and the cathedral assumed a prominent ecclesiastical role, serving as the residence of the Latin Patriarch of Jerusalem. During Saladin’s brief control of the city, the cathedral was converted into a mosque before being restored to Christian use when Crusader forces recaptured Acre in 1191.

By the late 13th century, the Crusader presence in the Holy Land was collapsing. In 1291, Acre fell to the Mamluks under Sultan Al-Ashraf Khalil, marking the end of Crusader rule; the city’s fortifications and its churches were demolished.

== In popular culture ==
The cathedral featured as one of the highest viewpoints in the videogame Assassin's Creed.

== Sources ==
- Edbury, Peter W.; Rowe, John G. (1990). William of Tyre: Historian of the Latin East. Cambridge University Press. ISBN 9780521407281.
- Folda, Jaroslav (2005). Crusader Art in the Holy Land: From the Third Crusade to the Fall of Acre, 1187–1291. Cambridge University Press. ISBN 9780521835831.
- Holt, Peter Malcolm (1986). The Age of the Crusades: The Near East from the Eleventh Century to 1517. Addison Wesley Longman Limited. ISBN 9781317871521.
- Weiss, Daniel H.; Mahoney, Lisa (2004). France and the Holy Land: Frankish Culture at the End of the Crusades. Johns Hopkins University Press.
- Williamson, H. G. M.; Hoyland, Robert G. (2018). The Oxford Illustrated History of the Holy Land. OUP Oxford. ISBN 9780191036460.
