= Church of St John the Baptist (Hospitaller, Acre) =

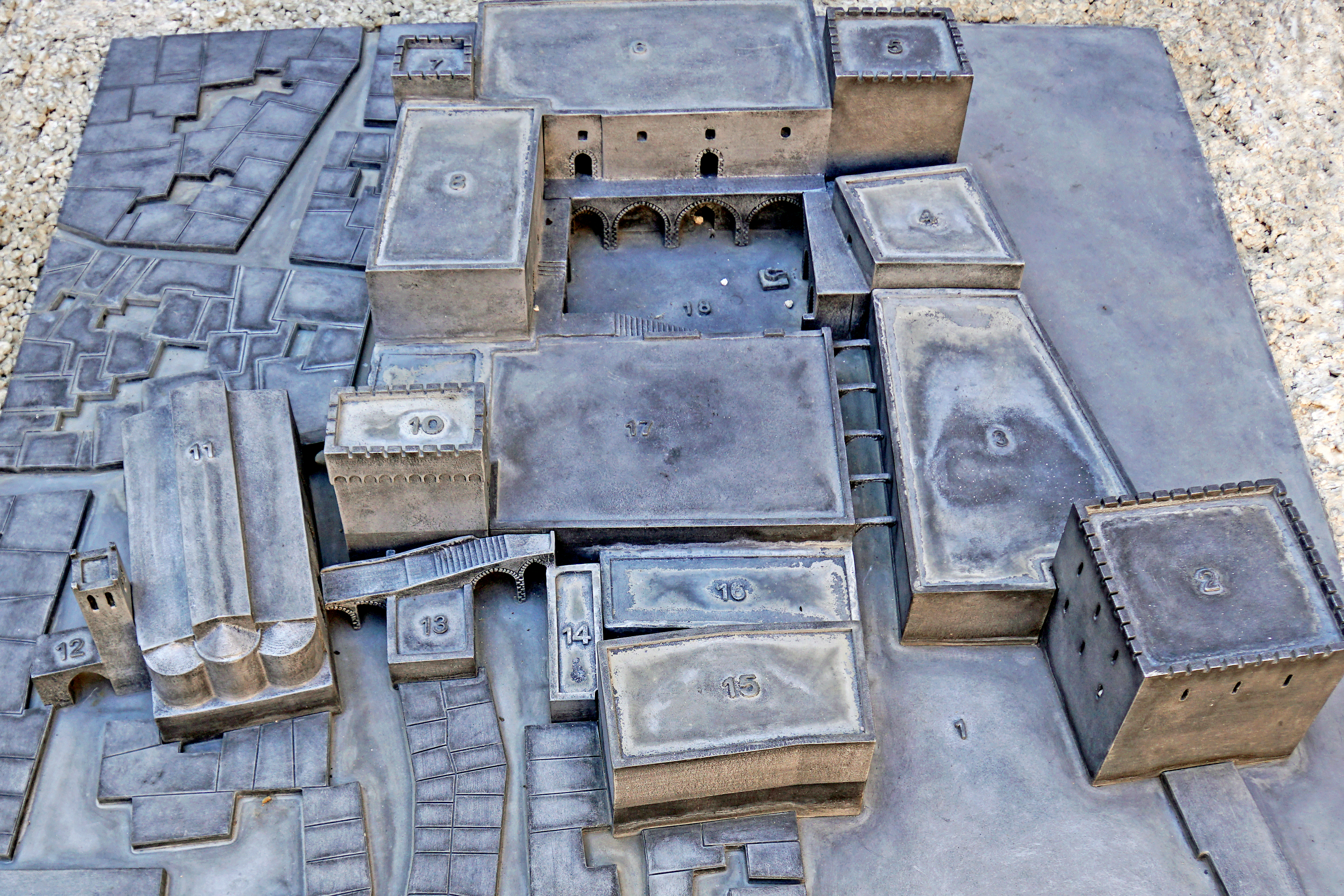
- Model of Church of St John the Baptist (left No. 11)
- Church of St John the Baptist
- 32°55′22.0″N 35°4′14.0″E
- Location: Acre
- Denomination: Catholic (Latin)
- Tradition: Christianity

History
- Founded: 12th century
- Founder: Knights Hospitaller
- Dedication: John the Baptist

Architecture
- Functional status: Destroyed
- Demolished: 1291 (Fall of Acre)

Administration
- Diocese: Latin Catholic Diocese of Acre

The Church of St John the Baptist was the principal church of the Knights Hospitaller in the Crusader city of Acre. It stood within the Hospitaller commandery of Saint-Jean-d'Acre, forming part of the complex now beneath the Ottoman Citadel of Acre.

== History ==
The church was founded by the Hospitallers after the capture of Acre in 1104, and served as their principal place of worship and burial within the order's vast fortified commandery. Dedicated to John the Baptist, it stood adjacent to the Hospitaller refectory and hospital wings and was one of the largest ecclesiastical buildings in the Crusader city.

Archaeological excavations have revealed portions of its crypt, apsidal foundations, and marble flooring beneath the Ottoman citadel. Six parallel vaulted halls with traces of Gothic ribs survive below ground level, while fragments of columns, capitals, and tracery indicate a substantial three-aisled church.

The church was destroyed following the Fall of Acre in 1291. Its remains were later incorporated into Ottoman military and administrative buildings, including the present Citadel of Acre and the Serail complex.
