= Hospitaller commandery of Saint-Jean-d'Acre =

- Saint-Jean d'Acre in Kingdom of Jerusalem, Israel
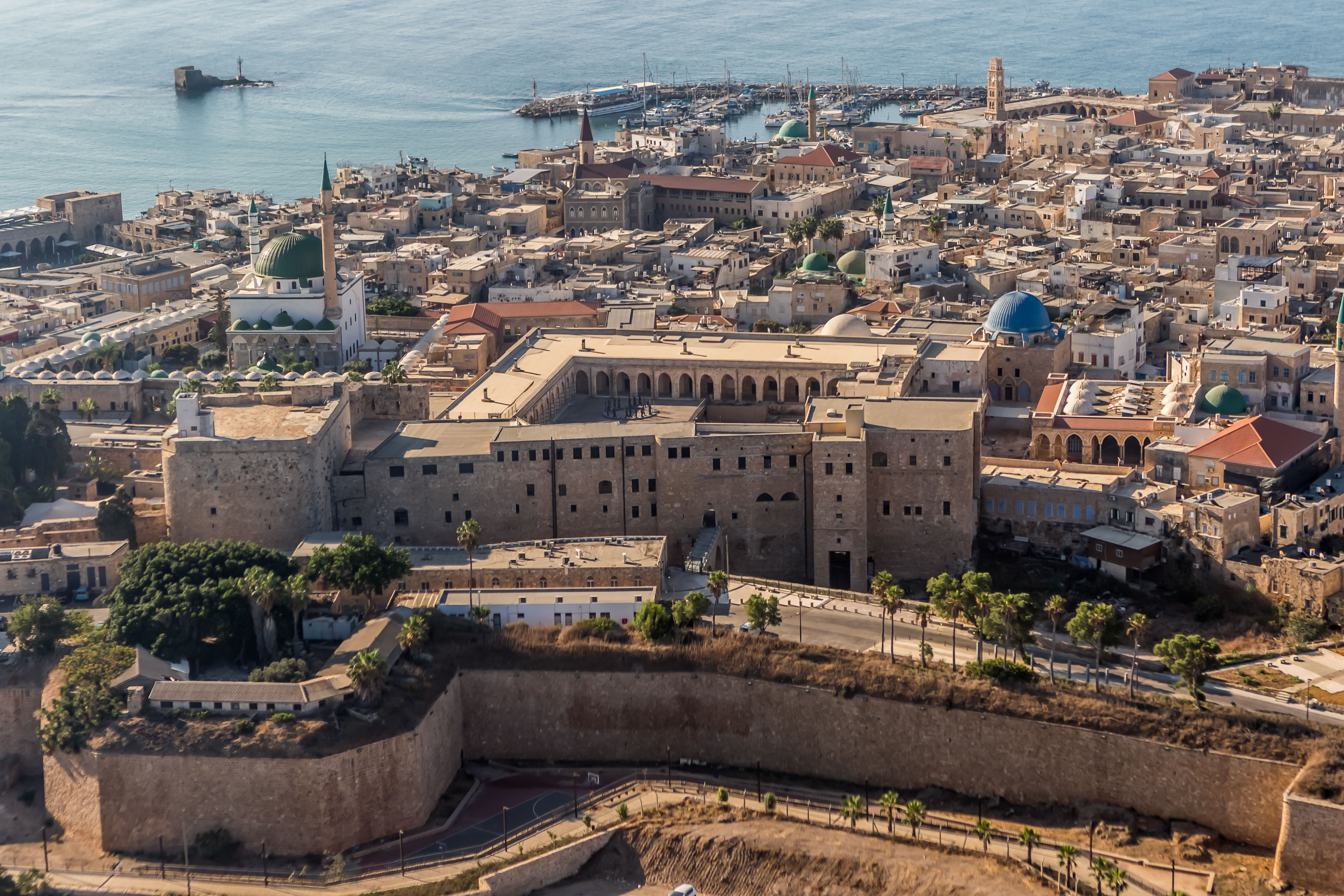
- Actual view of the commandery

- Flag of the Order of St. John

Site information
- Type: Commandery
- Owner: Knights Hospitaller
- Controlled by: Knights Hospitaller

Location
- Coordinates: 32°55′24.49″N 35°04′09.61″E

Site history
- Built: 12th century 13th century
- Built by: Knights Hospitaller
- In use: 1149-1291
- Materials: Sandstone
- Battles/wars: Siege of Saint-Jean-d'Acre (1189-1191); Siege of Saint-Jean-d'Acre (1291)
- Events: Crusades

The Hospitaller commandery of Saint-Jean-d'Acre is a monumental complex founded by the Order of St. John of Jerusalem, also known as the Knights Hospitallers. It is located in the city of Saint-Jean-d'Acre (now Acre in Israel). In the 13th century, the commandery became the headquarters of the Order until the fall of the city in 1291.

== History ==
=== The first years ===
From the first years of the establishment of the Crusaders in the city, the Hospitallers received donated properties. In 1110, King Baldwin I granted the Knights Hospitaller permission to keep the constructions located north of the Cathedral of the Holy Cross. In the years 1130, the buildings were damaged during works near the church and the Hospitallers decided to move near the 12th century north wall of the city. This is the actual place of the commandery.

In 1149, the first testimony of the commandery is in a document concerning the construction of the Saint-Jean church. In 1169, a pilgrim described the commandery of the Hospitallers of Acre as a very impressive fortified building.

=== Relocation of headquarters ===
After the defeat of Hattin in 1187, Saladin took the city. In 1191, during the third Crusade, the Frankish reconquered Acre after its siege. The Hospitallers moved back in their buildings. Jerusalem is no longer in the hands of the crusaders. And so the commandery becomes the new headquarters of the order. A new construction campaign took place between the end of 12th century and 13th century with new wings and additional floors.

== Architecture ==
=== The inner courtyard ===
The central courtyard covers an area of about 1,200 m^{2} and is enclosed by a series of arcades. On the east side, a staircase leads to the upper levels. Near the north side lies a well about 4.5 m deep with two shallow pools nearby, while the south side contains another well and a 1.5 m-deep pool.

=== The north wing ===
The north wing runs along the northern wall and consists of ten vaulted chambers, each about ten meters high, dating from the Frankish period. Its exterior wall, 3.5 m thick, reflects the defensive character of the structure. Two rooms were later added to the west. Windows in the south wall overlook a narrow passage and the wall of the pillar room, while the main entrance lies in the south side wall. Beneath the structure runs a vaulted drainage channel, approximately 1 m wide and 1.8 m high, which once connected to the harbor.

=== The west wing ===
The west wing, much altered by later Ottoman construction, preserves fragments of the medieval fabric beneath the 18th–19th-century Kışla (barracks). It originally contained service rooms and storage areas, aligned with the courtyard’s western arcade.

=== The east wing ===
The east wing connects the arcaded courtyard with the area of the former St John’s Church. It likely contained smaller service rooms and stairways leading to the lower levels and church crypts.

=== The south wing ===
The main hall of the south wing houses the refectory, sometimes wrongly described as the “Crypt of the Knights of St John.” Measuring approximately 44 × 22 m, it consists of two naves divided by three massive piers and covered with rib vaults about 10 m high. In the northeast and southeast corners, two corbels were found bearing the fleur-de-lys, the chief feature of the coat of arms of the kings of France. Louis VII adopted this emblem during the Second Crusade (1147–1149), and the example from Acre may relate to his visit in 1148.

=== The Saint-Jean church ===
South of the complex stood the Church of Saint John, the spiritual center of the Hospitaller commandery. Beneath later Ottoman structures remain its vaulted crypts and fragments of Gothic masonry, including parts of the apse and mosaic flooring.

== See also ==
- Pierre de Vieille-Brioude

== Gallery ==
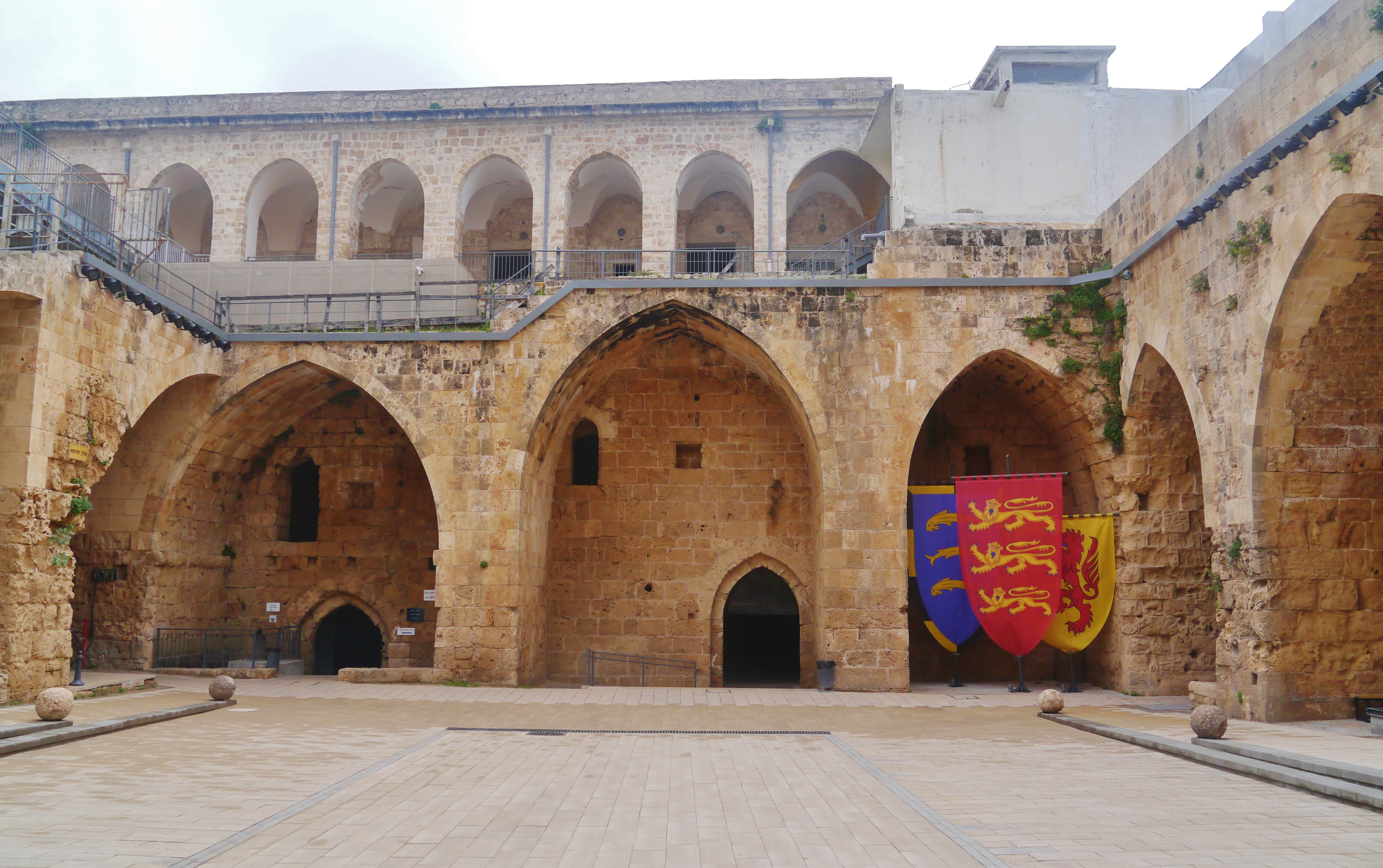
The courtyard.

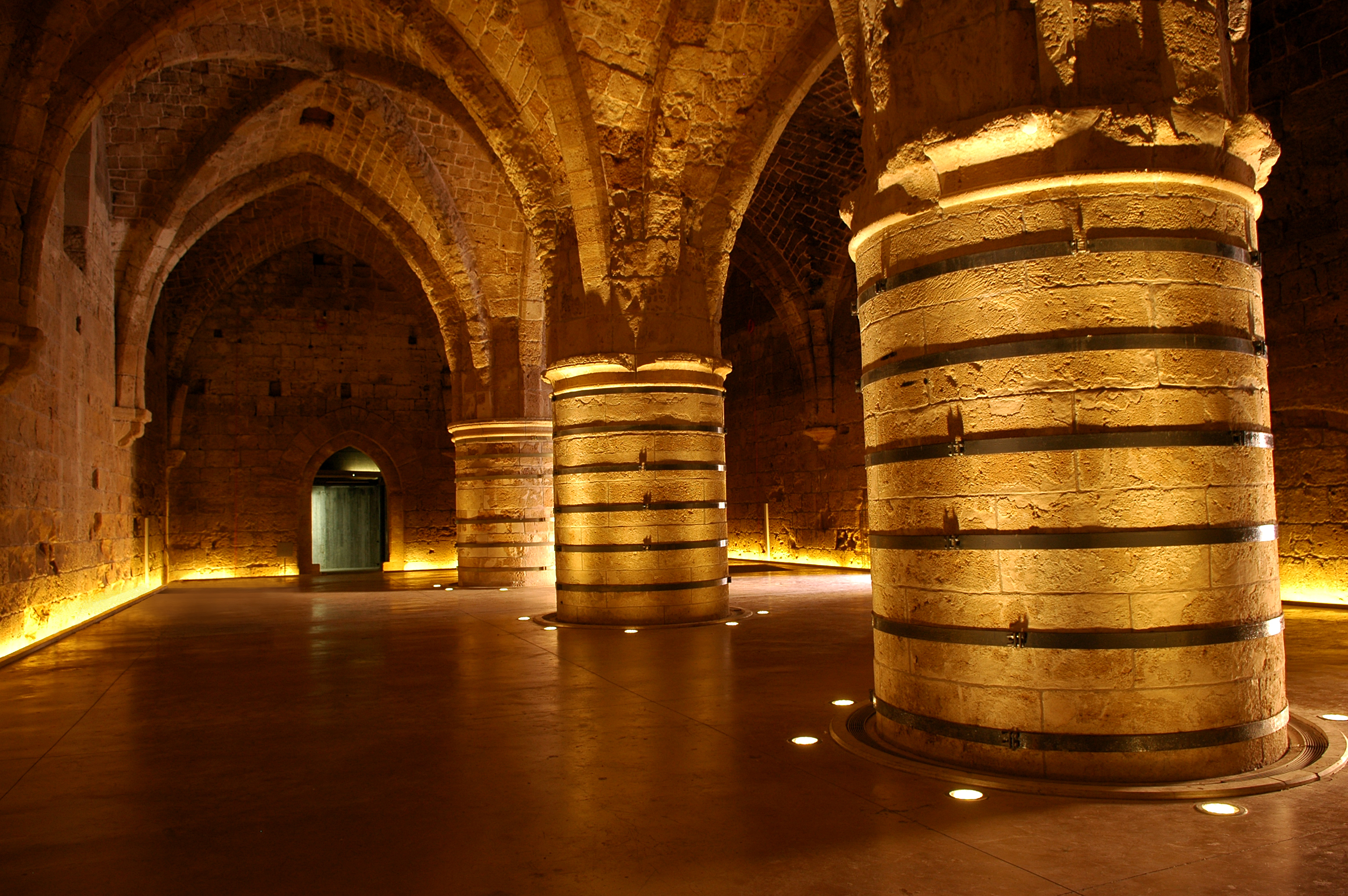
The refectory.

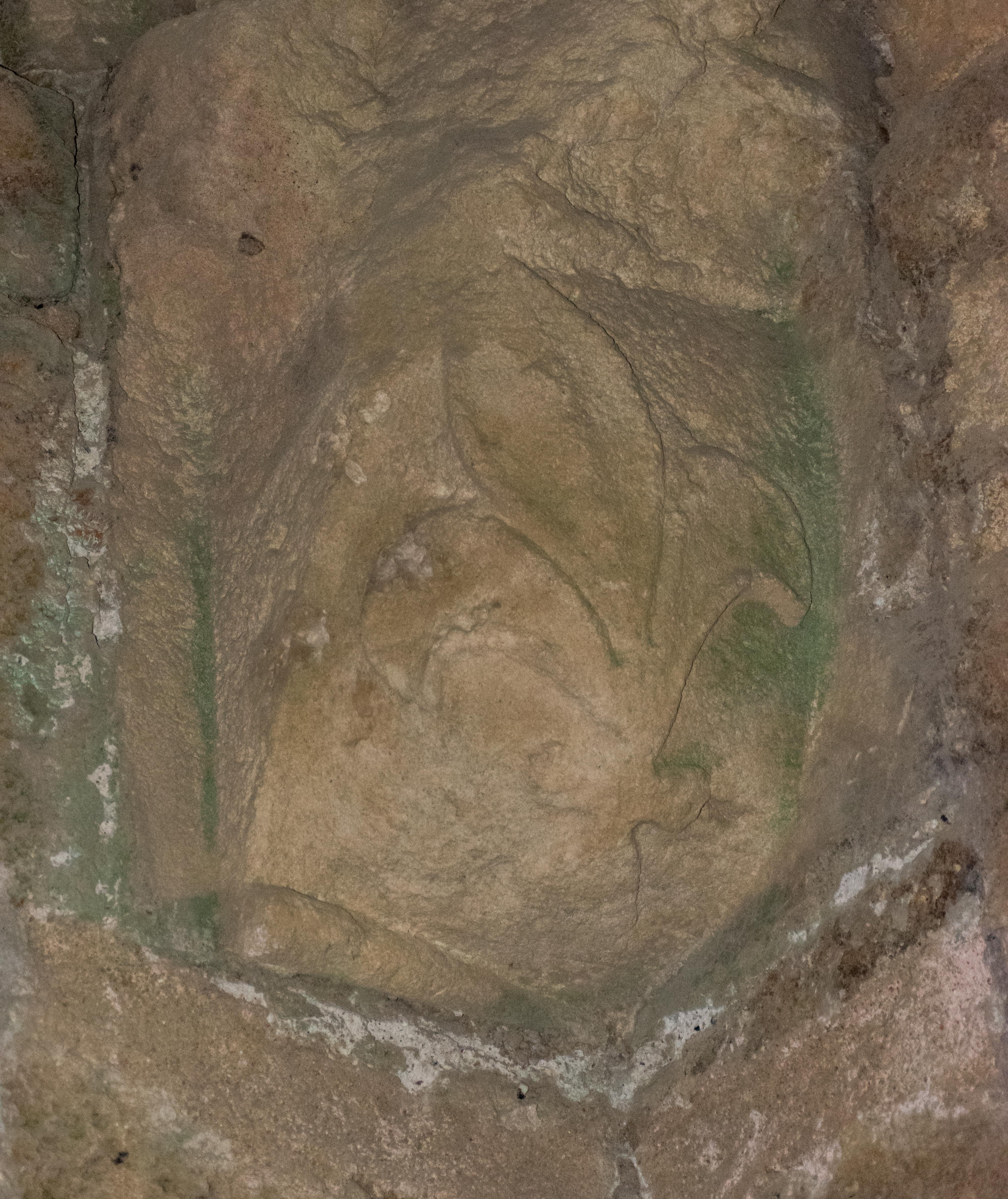
Console with a sculpted fleur-de-lis.

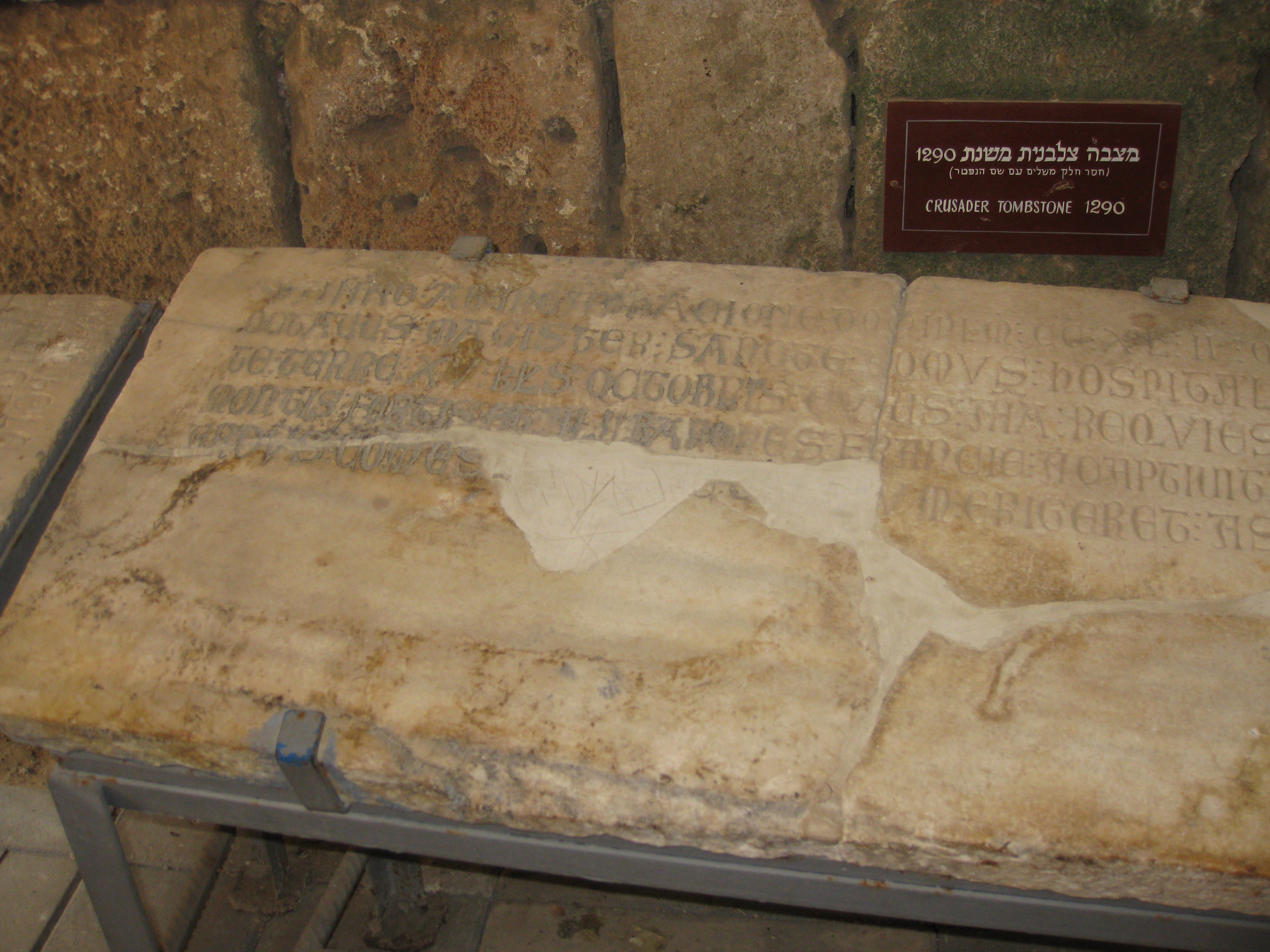
Gravestone of Pierre de Vieille-Brioude.

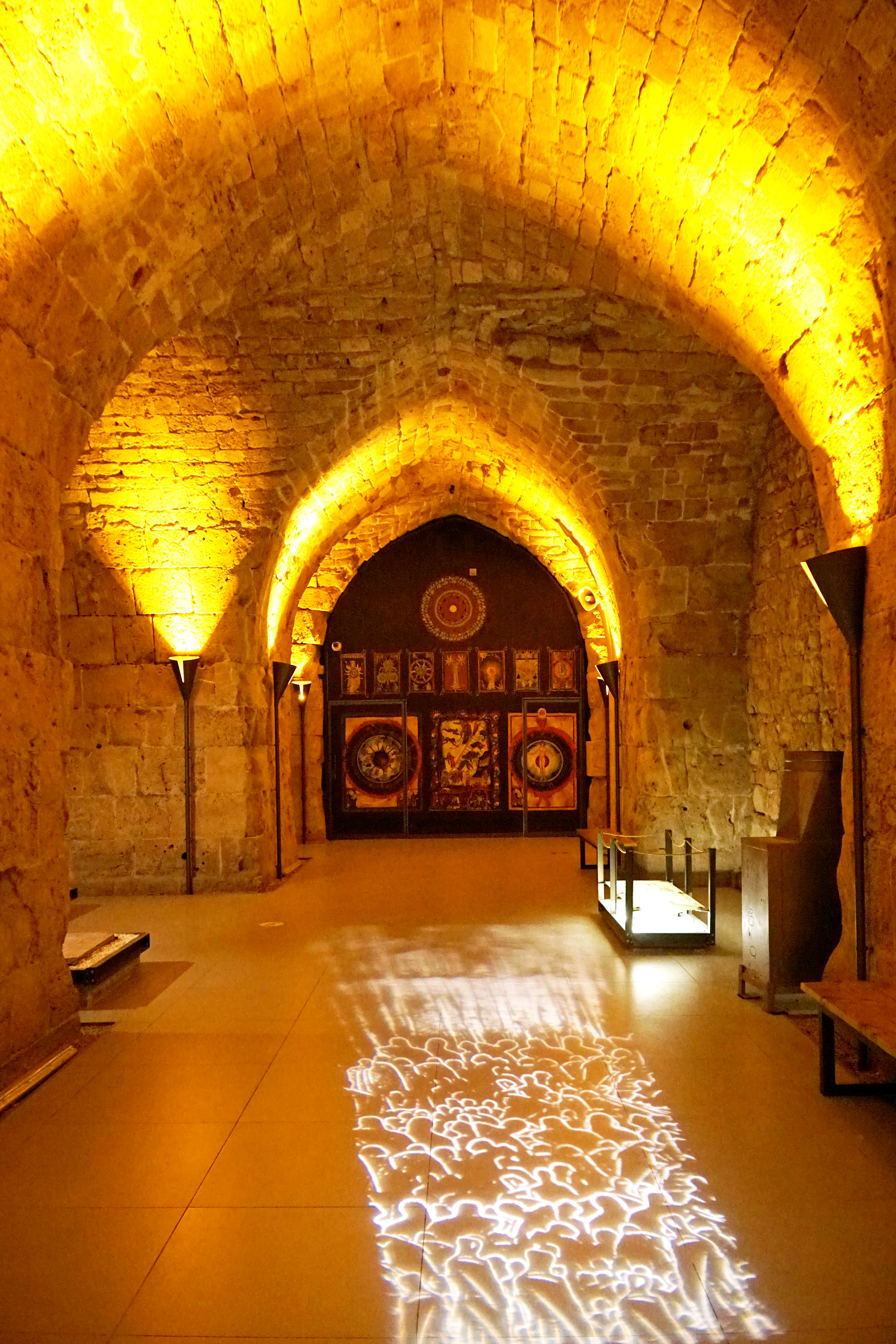
The crypt.

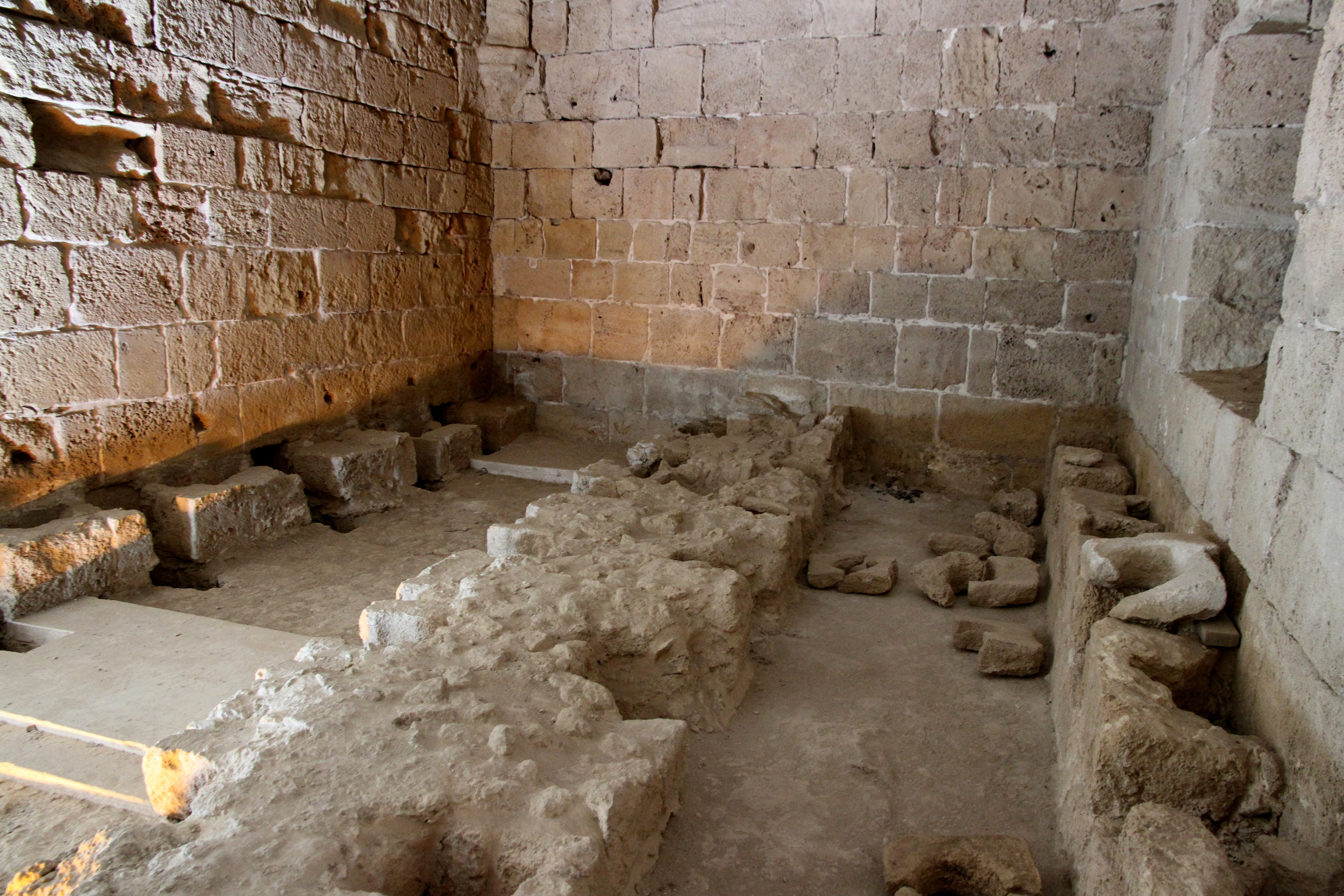
The latrines.

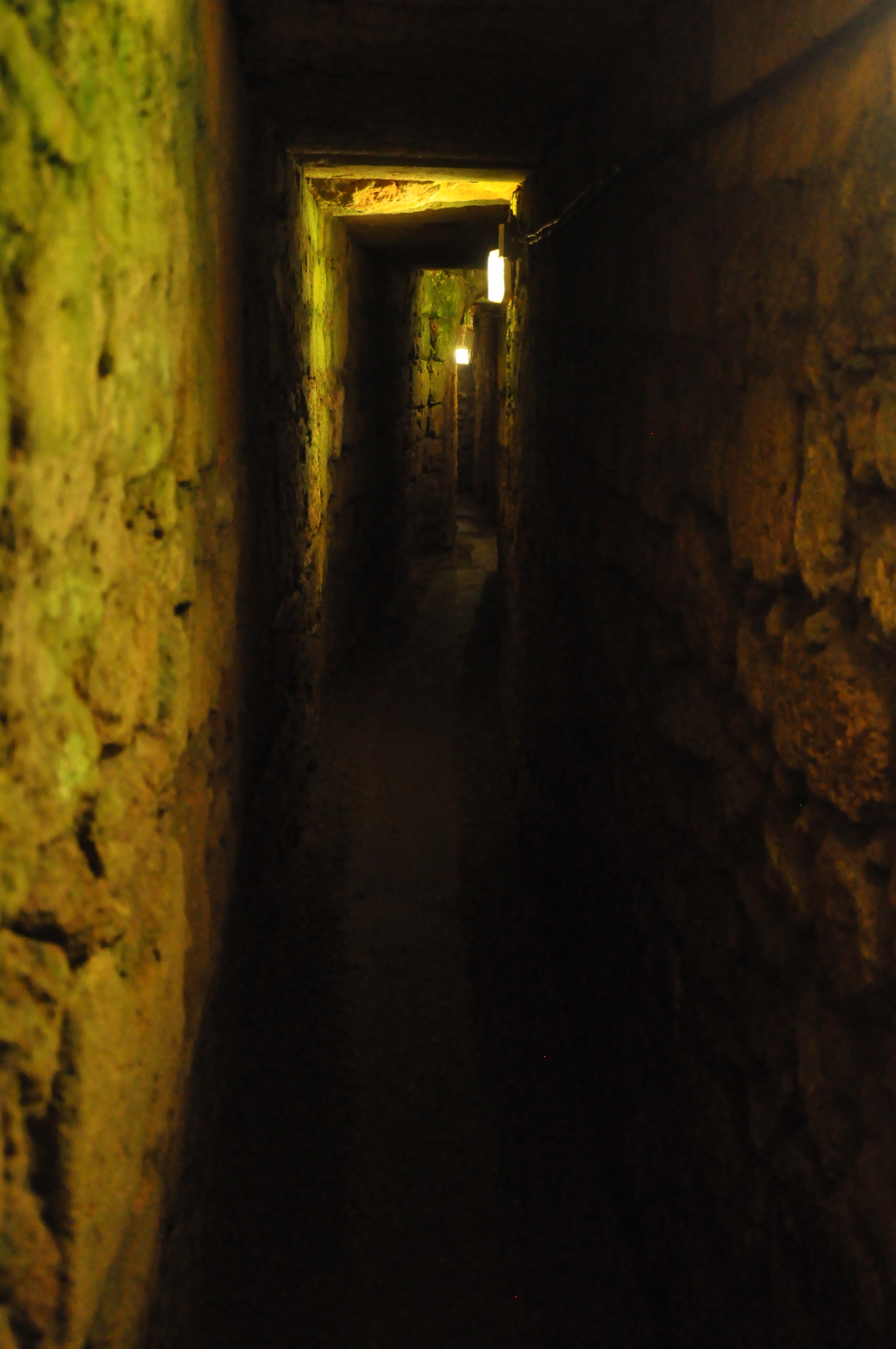
Tunnel under the commandery.

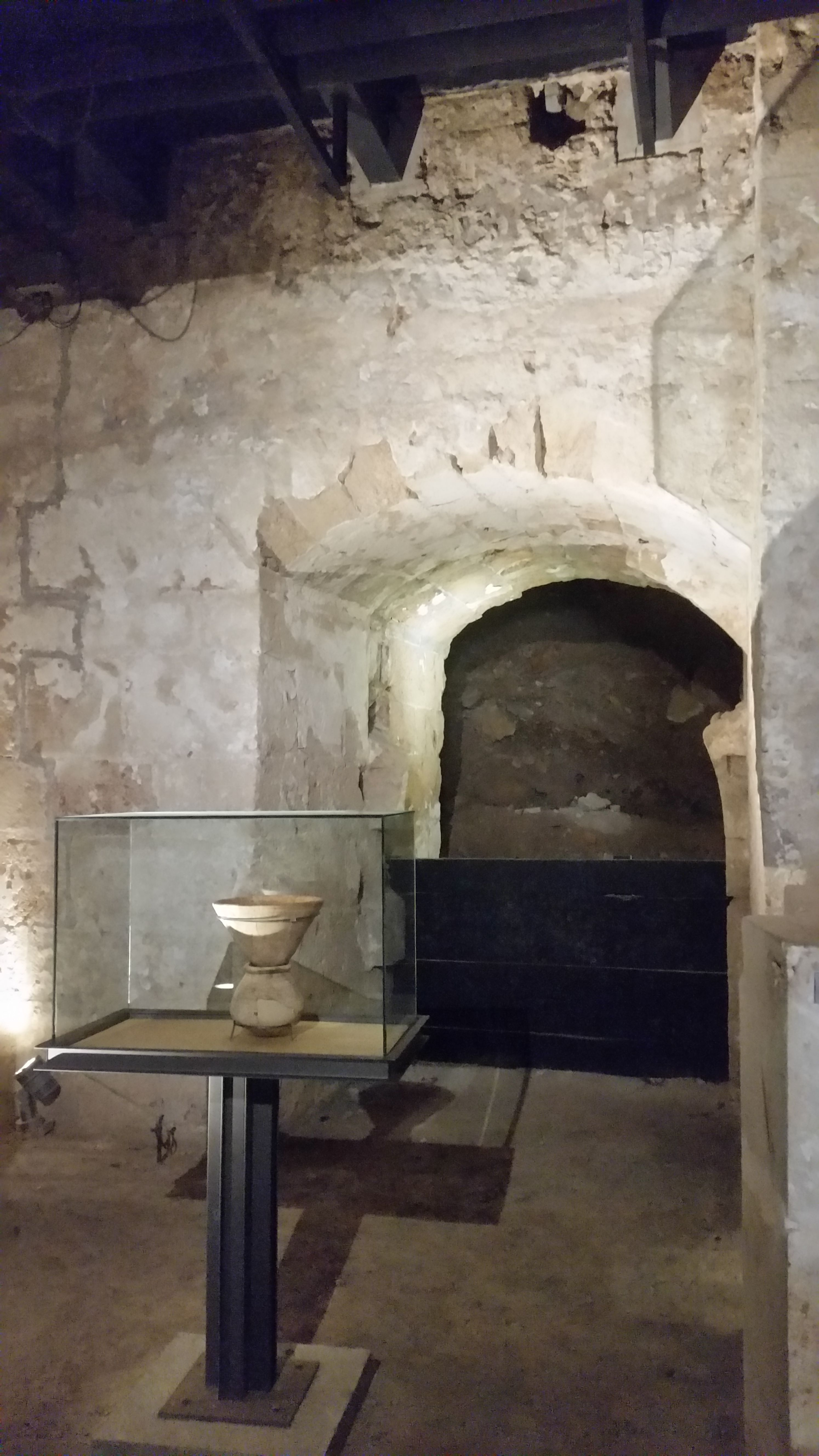
Hospitaller's sugar mould and molasses pot.
