= Church of St John of the Collachium =

Destroyed medieval church in Rhodes, Greece

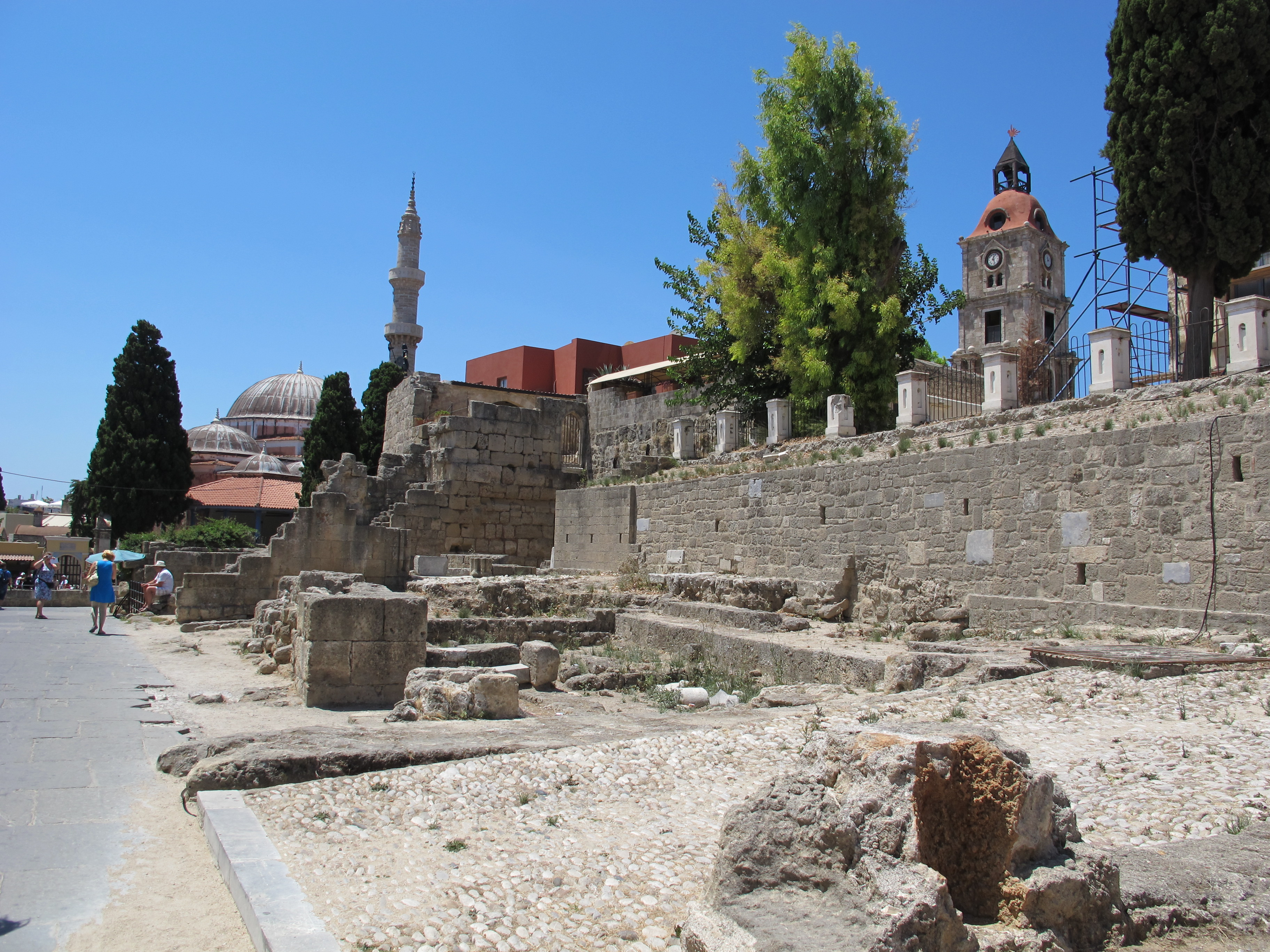
- Ruins of the former church, in 2013

- Location of the former church in Greece
- Location within the town of Rhodes
- 36°26′41″N 28°13′27″E
- Location: Rhodes, South Aegean
- Country: Greece
- Denomination: Roman Catholic (former)
- Previous denomination: Islam (1522–1856)

History
- Status: Church (1349–1522); Mosque (1522–1856)
- Founder: Knights Hospitaller
- Dedication: John the Baptist

Architecture
- Functional status: Destroyed (in partial ruins)
- Architectural type: Basilica
- Style: Gothic
- Years built: c. 1310 – c. 1349
- Groundbreaking: 24 June 1310
- Demolished: 6 November 1856

Specifications
- Length: 48–50 m (157–164 ft)
- Width: 15–18 m (49–59 ft)
- Materials: Granite; timber

Site notes
- Excavation dates: 1932, 1934, 1988, 1995
- Archaeologists: Pietro Lojacono (1932, 1934); Anna-Maria Kasdagli (1995)

The Church of St John of the Collachium was a medieval church built by the Knights Hospitaller in Rhodes, capital of the island of the same name. It was built in the first half of the fourteenth century and dedicated to the order's patron, John the Baptist. It was the conventual church of the Hospitallers, immediately adjacent to the Palace of the Grand Master, and presided over by the order's most senior religious official. It was used for religious services and processions, meetings of the order's chapter general, and for the elections and funerals of its grand masters.

Architecturally, the church was in the Gothic style, 48–50 metres (157–164 ft) long and 15–18 m (49–59 ft) wide. It was expanded in several phases, adding underground areas and a total of eight annexes, including several chapels. At least six Hospitaller grand masters were buried in the church, including Fabrizio del Carretto, whose elaborate funerary slab was placed in its central part. The church became famous for its collection of relics, which included objects associated with John the Baptist, Jesus, the Virgin Mary, and various other saints.

After the Ottoman conquest of Rhodes in 1522, the church became the town's main mosque. The building was damaged by two earthquakes in the nineteenth century, and destroyed on 6 November 1856 by a lightning strike which ignited gunpowder stored in its cellars, killing at least 200 people. In modern times, only small parts of the northern and eastern foundations remain, and the site has been built over with a school. Archaeological investigations of the site took place in 1932 and 1934 under Pietro Lojacono, in 1988, and under Anna-Maria Kasdagli in 1995.

== Architecture ==
=== Construction ===
The Church of St John was built in the collachium ('convent'), an area in the northern part of the town of Rhodes based on the walled Byzantine town and inhabited by the Hospitallers. The collachium was set apart from the burgus, the area of the city resided in by local inhabitants. The church was in the north-west part of the city, adjacent to the Grand Master's palace. It was dedicated to John the Baptist, the patron of the Knights Hospitaller. The site was previously occupied by an older church, which contained burials dating from the second half of the thirteenth century.

Construction of the church began shortly after the capture of the city of Rhodes by the Knights Hospitaller in 1310. (Note: Zoitou 2021, p. 13. For the date of the capture of Rhodes, see Failler 1992, p. 135.) A manuscript reported by the Flemish army officer Bernard Rottiers, who visited the church in 1828, was said to record that Foulques de Villaret, who was Grand Master between 1305 and 1319, laid the foundation stone on 24 June 1310, the Feast of the Nativity of John the Baptist, though the authenticity of this manuscript is now doubted. Construction seems to have finished under Foulques's successor, Hélion de Villeneuve, who was Grand Master until 1346 and whose coat of arms was carved into the church's north wall. Instructions for the staffing and the services of the church were laid down in the statutes of the order's legislative body, the chapter general, on 4 November 1314; a meeting was held in the church in 1318 to appoint a delegation to meet with Pope John XXII, and a woman who died in the same year was interred in a passageway underneath the church. Underground spaces were constructed beneath the main structure, one of which led to the loggia (covered gallery) between the church and the grand master's palace; these may variously have been crypts, storage rooms or chapels.

=== Physical description ===
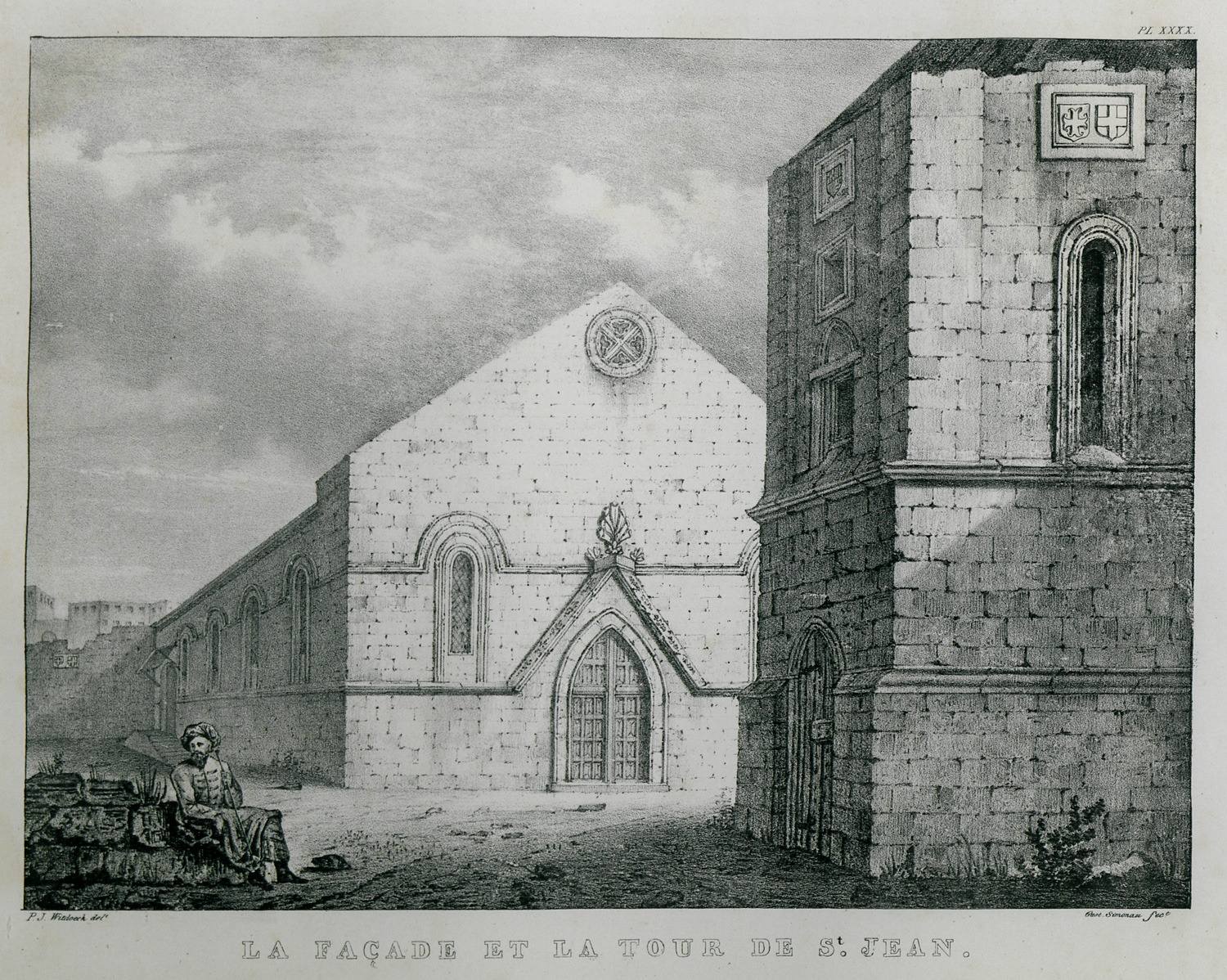
Exterior, lithograph by Pierre-Joseph Witdoeck, 1828

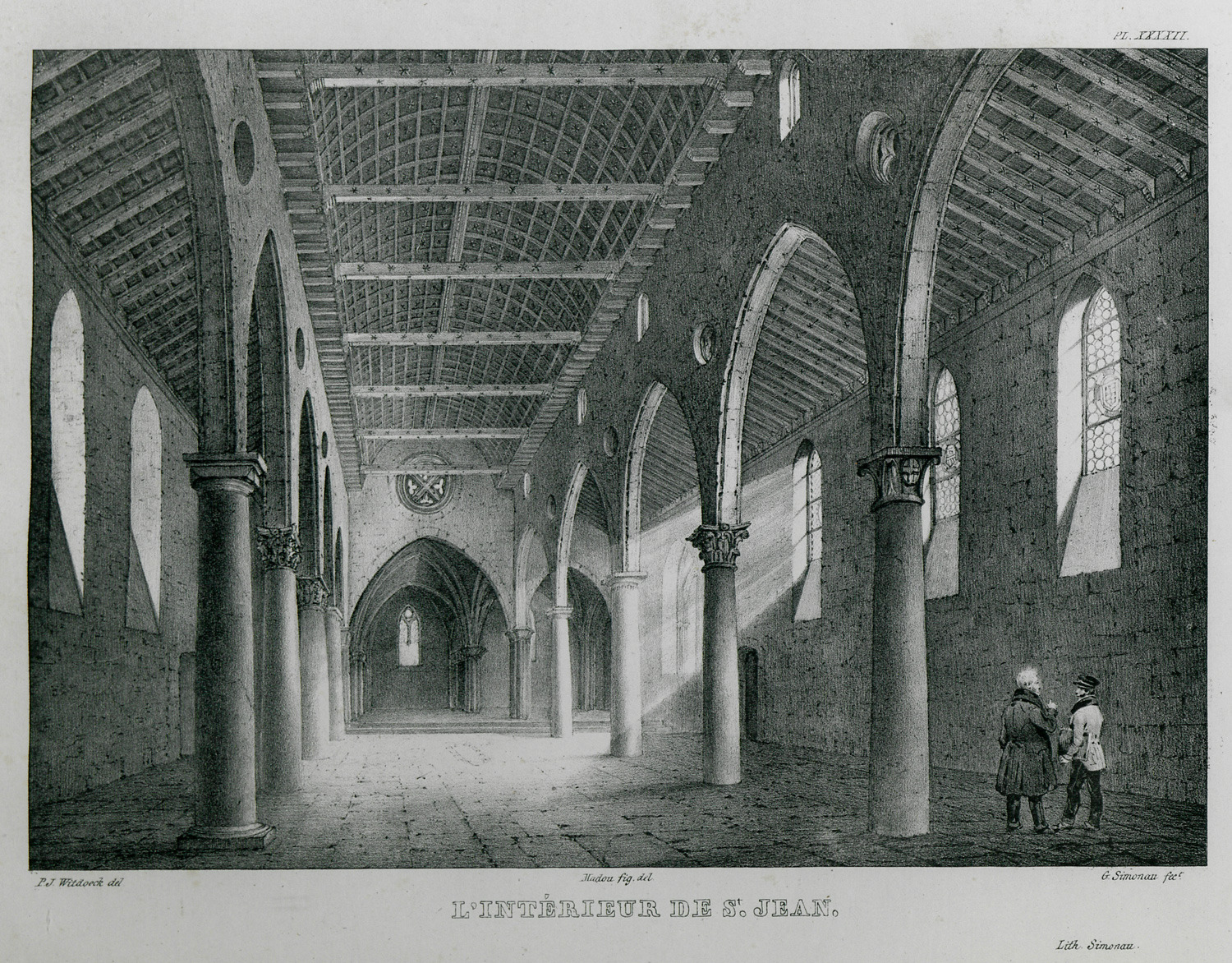
Interior, lithograph by Witdoeck, 1828

The historian Sofia Zoitou has characterised the architecture and contents of the Church of St John as "eloquently articulat[ing] the Knights' political and religious essence". It was built in the Gothic style, 48–50 metres (157–164 ft) long and 15–18 m (49–59 ft) wide. It was constructed as a three-aisled rectangular basilica: its transept was around 25 m (82 ft) long, its central nave was 6.9 m (23 ft) in width, and the south aisle 4.15 m (13.6 ft) wide. The transept and sanctuary were covered with four ribbed vaults: the roof of the aisles was made of timber, while the nave was roofed with a coffered barrel vault. Between the aisles were arcades, with pointed arches and a total of eight granite columns, spolia reused from an ancient building: the columns' capitals were carved in the classical Corinthian and Doric orders, and one of their bases had an inscription in Ancient Greek.

== History ==
The Church of St John was the conventual church of the Hospitallers, and among the largest in the city. Its priest, the Grand Prior of the Convent, was the most senior Hospitaller priest, a member of the order's council, and had responsibility for the knights' religious affairs. The Grand Prior could be a member of any of the order's seven langues ('tongues'), loose ethno-linguistic groupings denoting members' origins in western Europe. (Note: Zoitou 2021, pp. 13, 15. On the langues, see Begg 2020, p. 115.) The church was used for all of the order's religious services, for meetings of the chapter general, and for the elections, funerals and burials of grand masters. Several annual processions on religious feast days, including the anniversary of the Hospitallers' conquest of Malta, (Note: Commemorated on 15 August, the Day of the Assumption of the Virgin.) concluded at the church.

The fourteenth-century pilgrim Nicholas de Martoni described the church as small, but a "great place of piety". During the fifteenth century, priests for the church were summoned to Rhodes by the Hospitallers from Catholic parts of Europe. Between 1435 and 1439, the Spanish traveller Pero Tafur visited Rhodes, and noted that the church was filled with relics, and used both for religious services and for meetings of the Hospitallers. The church's organ was made in Venice and brought to Rhodes in 1476. In 1489, the Hospitaller Grand Master Pierre d'Aubusson was installed as a cardinal in the church.

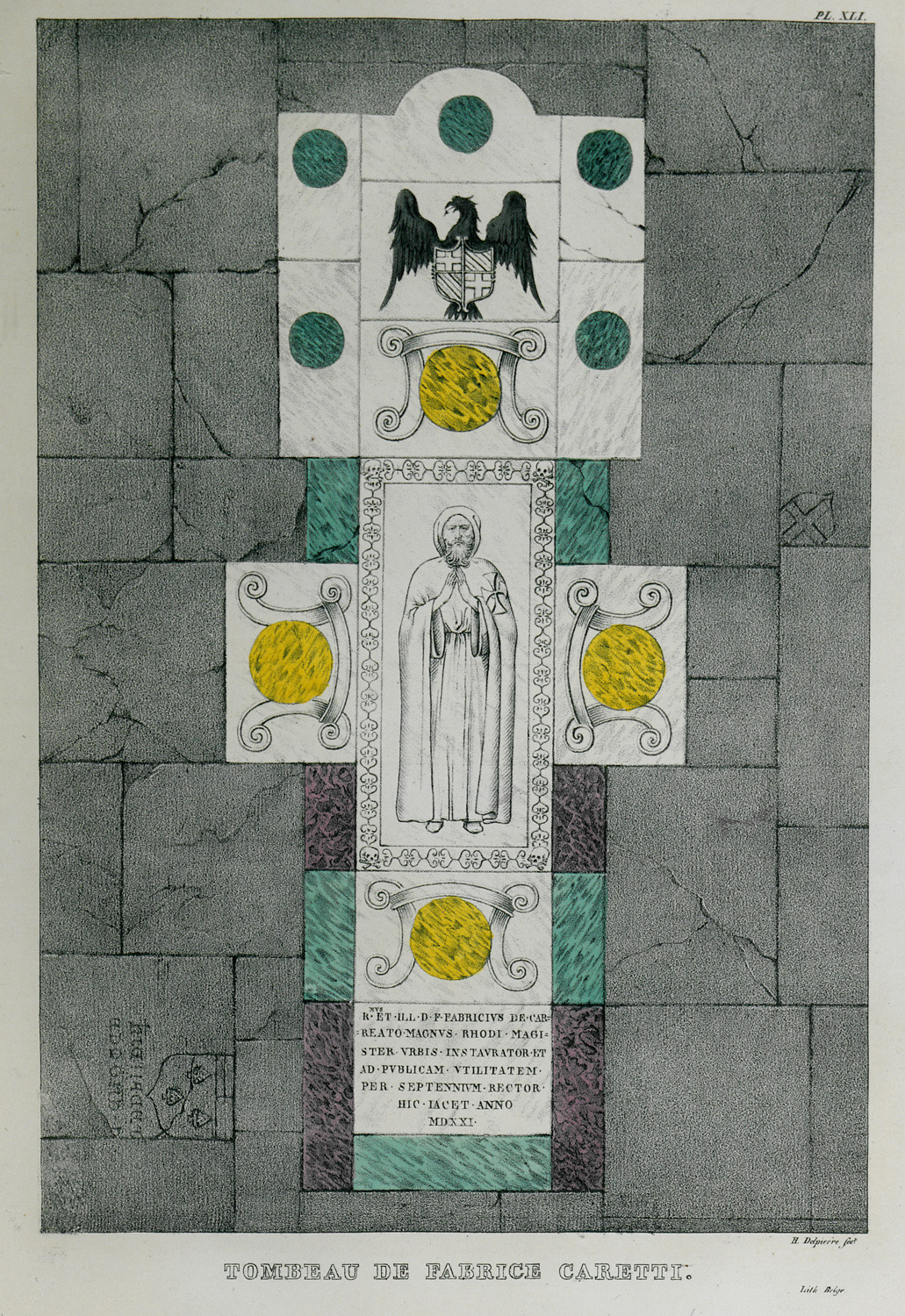
The tomb slab of Fabrizio del Carretto, depicted by Rottiers in 1828

Between the fourteenth and the sixteenth century, the church was mentioned in several guides for western European pilgrims, who would use Rhodes as a stop on journeys to the Holy Land. It was also depicted in miniatures of the same period. It was expanded in several phases, adding a total of eight annexes, over the period of Hospitaller rule on Rhodes. Most of these expansions involved the addition of chapels, though the overall schema and ground plan remained much as it had been in the fourteenth century. By 1479, these additions included a structure which was believed to contain the body of St Euphemia.

Of the thirteen Hospitaller grand masters who died on Rhodes, at least six are believed to have been buried in the church: Fabrizio del Carretto, who died in 1521, was entombed beneath an elaborate slab in its central part; the tomb of Dieudonné de Gozon, the successor of de Villeneuve who died in 1353, was probably near its main altar, while parts of the tombs of Pierre de Corneillan (died 1355), Robert de Juilly (died 1376), Jacques de Milly (died 1461) and Giovanni Battista Orsini (died 1476) were transferred to the Musée d'Orsay in Paris in 1877, following the church's destruction. (Note: Gordon Ellyson Abercrombie also lists Guy de Blanchefort, who died in 1513.) The church's bell tower, which included a clock by 1522, was probably repaired or rebuilt around the turn of the sixteenth century, possibly to repair damage from the failed Ottoman siege of 1480 and the earthquake of 1481.

After the Ottoman conquest of Rhodes in 1522, the church became the town's main mosque, and a mihrab (niche) was added to it. The bell tower was partly destroyed in the Ottoman siege, and replaced with a minaret. Non-Muslims were forbidden to enter the mosque until the nineteenth century. Ludwig Ross, a German archaeologist and former ephor-general of antiquities of Greece, visited in 1843, and noted an ancient Greek inscription, (Note: Following the destruction of the church in 1856, the inscription was recovered; it was presented to Edward, Prince of Wales (the future Edward VII), by the pasha (governor) of Rhodes when he visited the island in 1862.) several defaced tombs of Hospitaller knights, and images of the Apostles of Jesus in several niches. An earthquake in 1851 caused the top part of the belfry to collapse, while a further earthquake in 1856 destroyed the minaret. The British archaeologist Charles Newton visited the site during his consular service on Rhodes in April 1853, and wrote a description of the building: he commented that the wooden roof was painted in blue and decorated with stars, while stained-glass windows with escutcheons of the knights, noticed by Rottiers in 1828, were no longer present. Rottiers also described and illustrated the tomb slab of del Carretto.

== Treasures ==
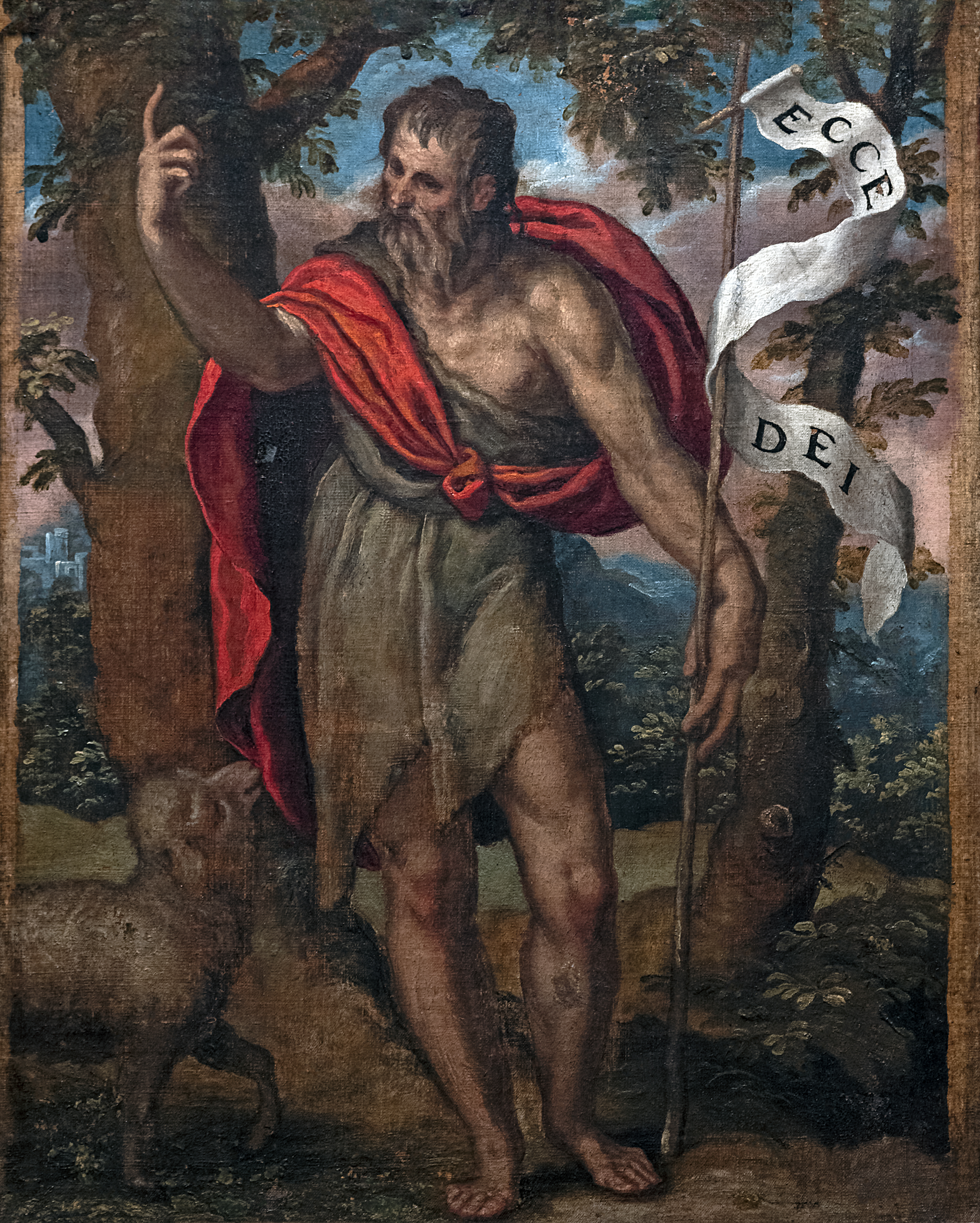
John the Baptist, as depicted by the seventeenth-century painter Paolo Farinati. The pennant shows the words ecce agnus dei ('behold the Lamb of God').

The Church of St John housed the Hospitallers' main collection of relics, which was probably moved there upon the church's construction. This collection included relics taken by the knights in Palestine, during their period in the Levant (until 1291), as well as the relics formerly held by the Knights Templar, which were given to the Hospitallers in 1313 after the Templar order was dissolved in 1312.

The first attested mention of this collection was made by Ludolf von Sudheim, a German priest who visited Rhodes on a journey to the Holy Land between 1336 and 1341. Von Sudheim recorded the presence of a bronze cross, believed to have been made from the bowl used by Jesus to wash the feet of his disciples. From the late fourteenth century, prompted by a loss of revenues caused by the Papal Schism of 1378, the Hospitallers took greater care to expand, curate and promote their collection of relics as a means of generating income from pilgrims visiting Rhodes. The collection became famous: it was described in several pilgrims' accounts, and listed in the Santa parola ('Holy Word'), a litany dating from 1389–1475, read by sailors and outlining the holy sites along the route of their voyage. Pilgrims' accounts recall that the relics were held in the church's sacristy and displayed in silver and gold monstrances.

The church's relics included objects associated with the Virgin Mary and various other saints. These included the right hand of John the Baptist: the hand is attested in the church from 1413, though other sites also claimed to possess the same relic, and a relic purporting to be the same object was ceremonially sent to the Hospitallers by the Ottoman sultan Bayezid II in 1484. The Hospitallers investigated and satisfied themselves of the authenticity of the hand send by Bayezid, and it was housed in a gold reliquary, decorated with pearls and precious stones, donated by d'Aubusson, the grand master. Other relics included a bowl used by Jesus, a large piece of wood believed to be from the True Cross – brought by the Hospitallers from the Levant – and one of the thirty pieces of silver paid to Judas Iscariot to betray Jesus. This coin was reported to be in Rhodes from the mid-fourteenth century; from the late fifteenth century, wax and sometimes metal copies of it were made and given to pilgrims. Pilgrims' descriptions of the coin suggest that it was probably a drachm or didrachm of the Hellenistic period, minted on Rhodes between 360 and 230 BCE.

By the early sixteenth century, other treasures held by the church included gilt statues of the Apostles, situated around the altar; either thirteen or sixteen silver lamps; and a gold statue of the agnus dei, donated by Charles Alleman de Rochechinard during the grand mastership of Emery d'Amboise, between 1503 and 1512. (Note: Zoitou 2021, p. 34. For the dates of d'Amboise's grand mastership, see Abercrombie 2024, p. 295.) The church also held a set of silver-gilt kneeling angels, which was placed on the altar during major events. By 1474, it had a chalcedony basin with a silver-gilt rim, used for the lavabo (ceremonial washing of the priest's hands) during services, a silver or silver-gilt image of the Virgin Mary with the baby Jesus, and another of John the Baptist holding the agnus dei. In the early fifteenth century, it was recorded as holding a garment belonging to the Virgin Mary, and as possessing one of her shoes in 1519. It also held body parts – chiefly arms and heads – said to belong to various saints: these included, by 1350, the arms of St George, St Stephen and St Anthony. Over the course of the fifteenth and early sixteenth century, the collection expanded considerably, encompassing relics from, among others, St Andrew, St Polycarp and St Thomas Becket, as well as a finger of Mary Magdalene.

== Destruction ==
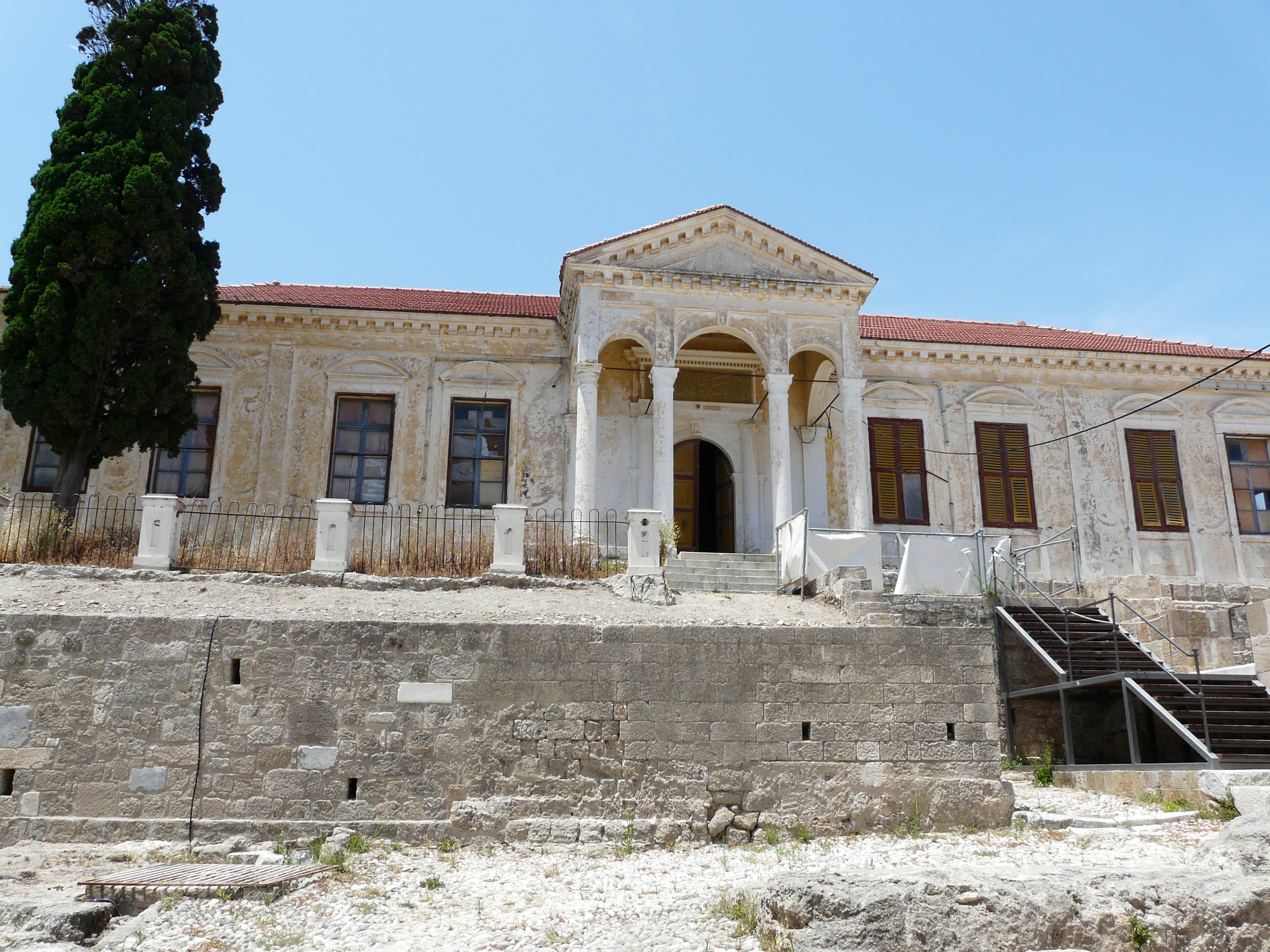
The second school constructed on the site of the Church of St John, c. 1898, with ruins of the church visible in the foreground

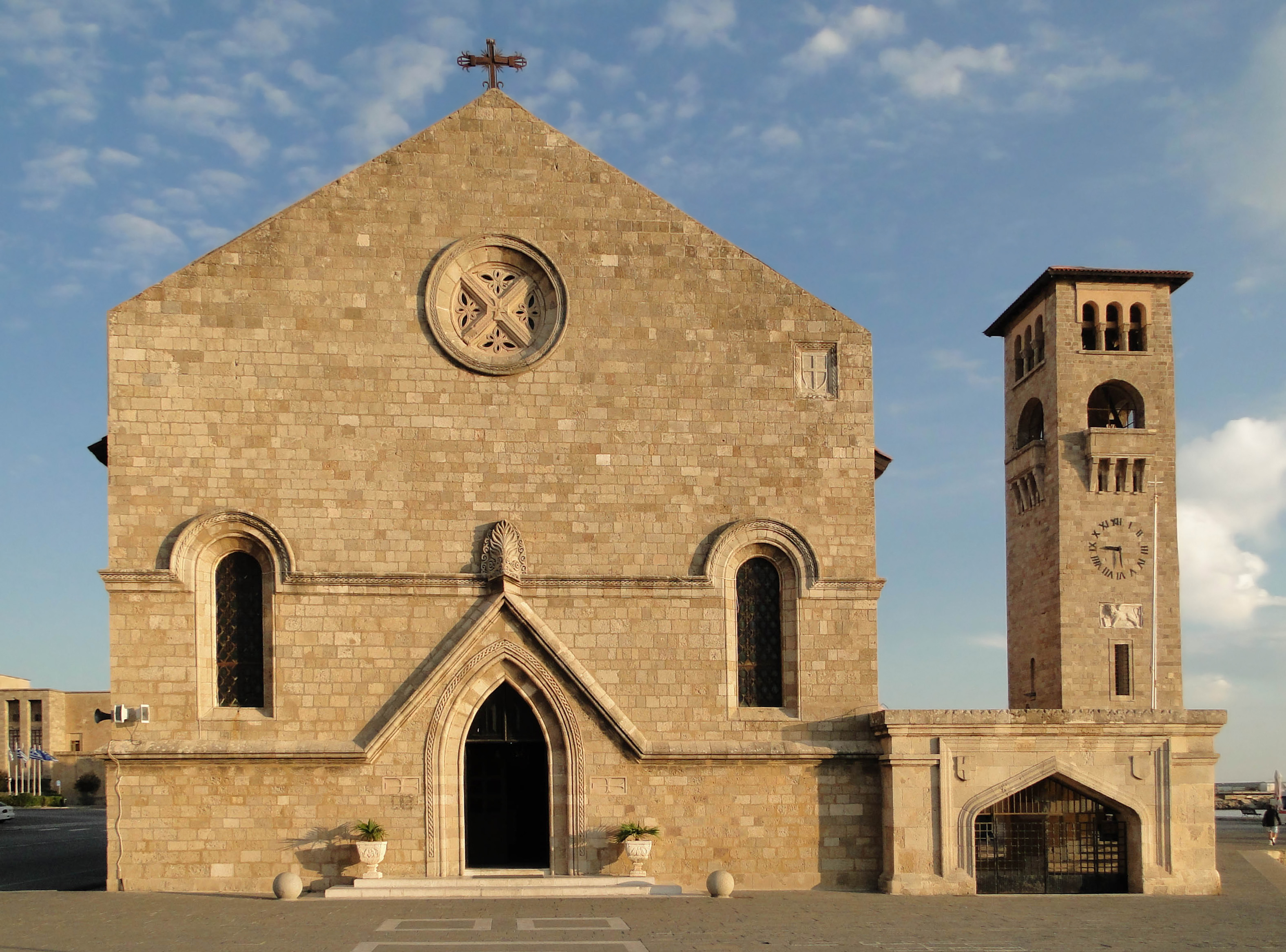
The Church of the Annunciation at Mandraki, constructed in imitation of the Church of St John in the 1920s

The building was destroyed on 6 November 1856 by an explosion after lightning struck gunpowder stored in the cellars of its bell tower. At least 200 people were killed, and the explosion damaged nearby houses as well as the adjacent Palace of the Grand Master. (Note: Chambers's Encyclopaedia, in 1876, gave the total number of destroyed houses as 300 and the death toll as over 1000.)

The amateur archaeologist Alfred Biliotti, who was serving as a consular official for the United Kingdom on Rhodes, conducted an impromptu excavation to rescue survivors. Building materials, particularly marble floor slabs, were salvaged from the site, and the tomb of del Carretto was looted. The site was built over with a school: pieces of the destroyed structure were used in the construction. A second school building, in the neoclassical style, was built to replace the first around 1898.

In modern times, only small parts of the northern and eastern foundations of the church can be seen. The Church of the Annunciation at Mandraki (the main harbour of Rhodes) was built under the Italian architect Florestano Di Fausto between 1924 and 1929, reconstructing what was then believed to be the form of the Church of St John.

== Archaeological study ==
Italy ruled the Dodecanese from 1912 until 1945; in 1932 and 1934, the engineer Pietro Lojacono made small-scale archaeological studies of the church's ruins. Further archaeological work took place in 1988, after heavy rain caused the collapse of a revetting wall, uncovering a tomb underneath the central part of the church. The tomb contained grave goods, including a hoard of 190 coins dated to between 1488 and 1503, but no skeleton was found, leading to the suggestion that it may have been a child's grave. (Note: Children's bones are often less well preserved than those of adults, particularly in acidic soils and for the bones of younger individuals, and smaller bones are more likely to be missed by archaeological investigation.) Further excavations took place in 1995, under Anna-Maria Kasdagli, uncovering the bases of the granite columns in the arcades and demonstrating their status as spolia. These excavations also investigated a tomb considered to be that of Fabrizio del Carretto.

== See also ==
- Catholic Church in Greece
- List of churches in Greece
- List of former mosques in Greece
- Ottoman Rhodes
- St John's Co-Cathedral in Valletta, Malta, the Hospitallers' conventual church between the 16th and 18th centuries

== Sources ==
- Abercrombie, Gordon Ellyson (2024). The Hospitaller Knights of Saint John at Rhodes 1306–1522. Huddersfield: Pen and Sword. ISBN 9781399048040.
- Balard, Michel (2013). "The Urban Landscape of Rhodes as Perceived by Fourteenth- and Fifteenth-Century Travellers". In Arbel, Benjamin (ed.). Intercultural Contacts in the Medieval Mediterranean: Studies in Honour of David Jacoby. Milton Park: Taylor & Francis. pp. 24–34. ISBN 9781135781958.
- Barchard, David (2006). "The Fearless and Self-Reliant Servant: The Life and Career of Sir Alfred Biliotti (1833–1915), an Italian Levantine in British Service" (PDF). Studi Miceni ed Egeo-Anatolici. 48: 5–53. ISSN 1126-6651.
- Baxter, Jane Eva (2022). The Archaeology of Childhood. London: Rowman & Littlefield. ISBN 9781442268517.
- Begg, D. J. Ian (2020). Lost Worlds of Ancient and Modern Greece: Gilbert Bagnani: The Adventures of a Young Italo-Canadian Archaeologist in Greece, 1921–1924. Oxford: Archaeopress. ISBN 9781789694536.
- Buttigieg, Emanuel; Phillips, Simon (2016). Islands and Military Orders, c. 1291– c. 1798. London and New York: Routledge. ISBN 9781317111962.
- Chambers, William; Chambers, Robert (1876). Chambers's Encyclopaedia: A Dictionary of Universal Knowledge for the People. Vol. 8 (Revised ed.). London: W. and R. Chambers. OCLC 890772187.
- Failler, Albert (1992). "L'occupation de Rhodes par les Hospitaliers" [The Occupation of Rhodes by the Hospitallers]. Revue des études byzantines [Review of Byzantine Studies] (in French). 50: 113–135. ISSN 2261-060X.
- Falk, Avner (1996). A Psychoanalytic History of the Jews. Vancouver: Fairleigh Dickinson University Press. ISBN 9780838636602.
- Harwig, Georg (1875). The Aerial World: A Popular Account of the Life and Phenomena of the Atmosphere. New York: D. Appleton. OCLC 2208210 – via Internet Archive.
- Kasdagli, Anna-Maria; Katsioti, Angeliki; Michaelidou, Maria (2007). "Archaeology on Rhodes and the Knights of St John of Jerusalem". In Edbury, Peter; Kalopissi-Verti, Sophia (eds.). Archaeology on Rhodes and the Knights of Saint John of Jerusalem: Archaeology and the Crusades, Proceedings of the Round Table, Nicosia, 1 Feb. 2005. Athens: Pierides Foundation. pp. 35–62. ISBN 978-9963-9071-2-0 – via Academia.edu.
- Kasdagli, Anna-Maria (1995). Ανασκαφικές εργασίες. Ρόδος. Μεσαιωνική πόλη. Οδός Παναιτίου. [Archaeological Works. Rhodes. Medieval City. Panaitiou Street]. Αρχαιολογικόν Δελτίον: Χρονικά [Archaeological Bulletin: Reports] (in Greek). 50: 821–823. ISSN 0570-622X.
- Kasdagli, Anna-Maria (2016). Stone Carving of the Hospitaller Period in Rhodes: Displaced Pieces and Fragments. Oxford: Archaeopress. ISBN 9781784914790.
- Kasdagli, Anna-Maria (2018). Coins in Rhodes: From the Monetary Reform of Anastasius I Until the Ottoman Conquest (498–1522). Oxford: Archaeopress. ISBN 9781784918422.
- Mays, Simon (2002). The Archaeology of Human Bones. London and New York: Routledge. ISBN 1134687931.
- McGuire, Valerie (2020). Italy's Sea: Empire and Nation in the Mediterranean, 1895–1945. University of Liverpool Press. ISBN 9781800346000.
- Newton, Charles Thomas (1865). Travels and Discoveries in the Levant (PDF). Vol. 1. London: Day & Son. OCLC 470755259.
- Papanikolaou, Prodromos (2017). Tο καθολικό του Αγίου Ιωάννη στο Koλλάκιο εκ νέου. Spolia, ιστορικές πληροφορίες και ερμηνευτικά ζητήματα [The Church of St John in the Collachium Anew: Spolia, Historical Information and Interpretative Issues]. In Triantafyllidis, Paulos (ed.). Το αρχαιολογικό έργο στα νησιά του Αιγαίου. Διεθνές επιστημονικό συνέδριο, Ρόδος, 27 Νοεμβρίου–1 Δεκεμβρίου 2013 [Archaeological Work in the Aegean islands. International Scientific Conference, Rhodes, 27 November –1 December, 2013] (in Greek). Vol. 3. Mytilene: Ministry of Culture and Sport. pp. 501–520. ISBN 9789603863199 – via Academia.edu.
- Petsa-Tzounakou, Vassilia (1996). Art and History of Rhodes: Lindos, Kamiros, Ialyssos, Embonas. Florence: Bonechi. ISBN 8880294652.
- Ross, Ludwig (1845). Reisen auf den griechischen Inseln des ägäischen Meeres [Travels on the Greek Islands of the Aegean Sea] (in German). Vol. 3. Stuttgart: J. G. Gotta. OCLC 32053528.
- Sarnowsky, Jürgen (2015). "The Priests in the Military Orders: A Comparative Approach of their Standing and Role". In Carraz, Damien; Josserand, Philippe; Oliveira, Luís Filipe (eds.). Élites et ordres militaires au Moyen Âge: rencontre autour d'Alain Demurger [Elites and Military Orders in the Middle Ages: Conference around Alain Demurger]. Madrid: Casa de Velázquez. pp. 215–224. ISBN 9788415636885.
- Setton, Kenneth Meyer (1978). The Papacy and the Levant, 1204–1571. Vol. 2: The Fourteenth and Fifteenth Centuries. Philadelphia: American Philosophical Society. ISBN 0871691272 – via Internet Archive.
- Setton, Kenneth Meyer (1984). The Papacy and the Levant, 1204–1571. Vol. 3: The Sixteenth Century. Philadelphia: American Philosophical Society. OCLC 1241678661.
- Sire, Henry J. A. (1994). The Knights of Malta. New Haven: Yale University Press. ISBN 0300068859.
- Vasiliev, Alexander (1932). "Pero Tafur: A Spanish Traveler of the Fifteenth Century and His Visit to Constantinople, Trebizond and Italy". Byzantion. 7 (1): 75–122. ISSN 0378-2506. JSTOR 44167894.
- Zoitou, Sofia (2021). Staging Holiness: The Case of Hospitaller Rhodes (ca. 1309–1522). Mediterranean Art Histories. Vol. 3. Leiden: Brill. ISBN 9789004444225.
