= Pierre d'Aubusson =

Grand Master of the Order of Saint John of Jerusalem (1423-1503)

His Eminence Pierre d'Aubusson
- Cardinal-Deacon of Sant'Adriano al Foro
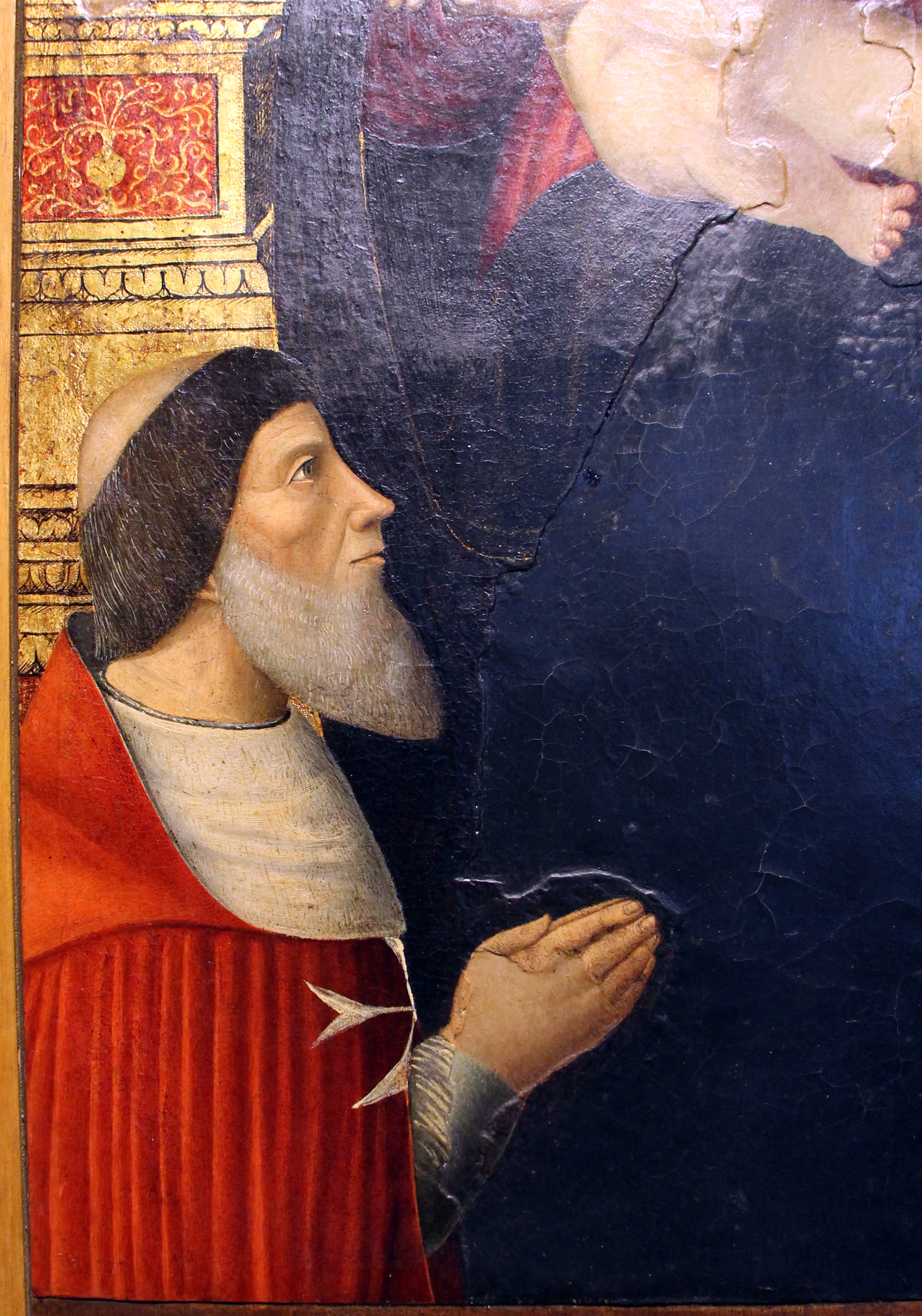
- Corner portion of Our Lady of Victory with Pierre d'Aubusson and Saints John the Baptist and Pantaleone, by Giovanni Barbagelata, 1503
- Church: Catholic Church
- Appointed: 23 March 1489
- Term ended: 3 July 1503
- Predecessor: Giovanni Conti
- Successor: François Guillaume de Castelnau

Orders
- Created cardinal: 9 March 1489 by Pope Innocent VIII
- Rank: Cardinal-Deacon

Personal details
- Born: 1423 Le Monteil-au-Vicomte, France
- Died: 3 July 1503 (aged 79–80) Rhodes, Greece
- Coat of arms: Pierre d'Aubusson's coat of arms

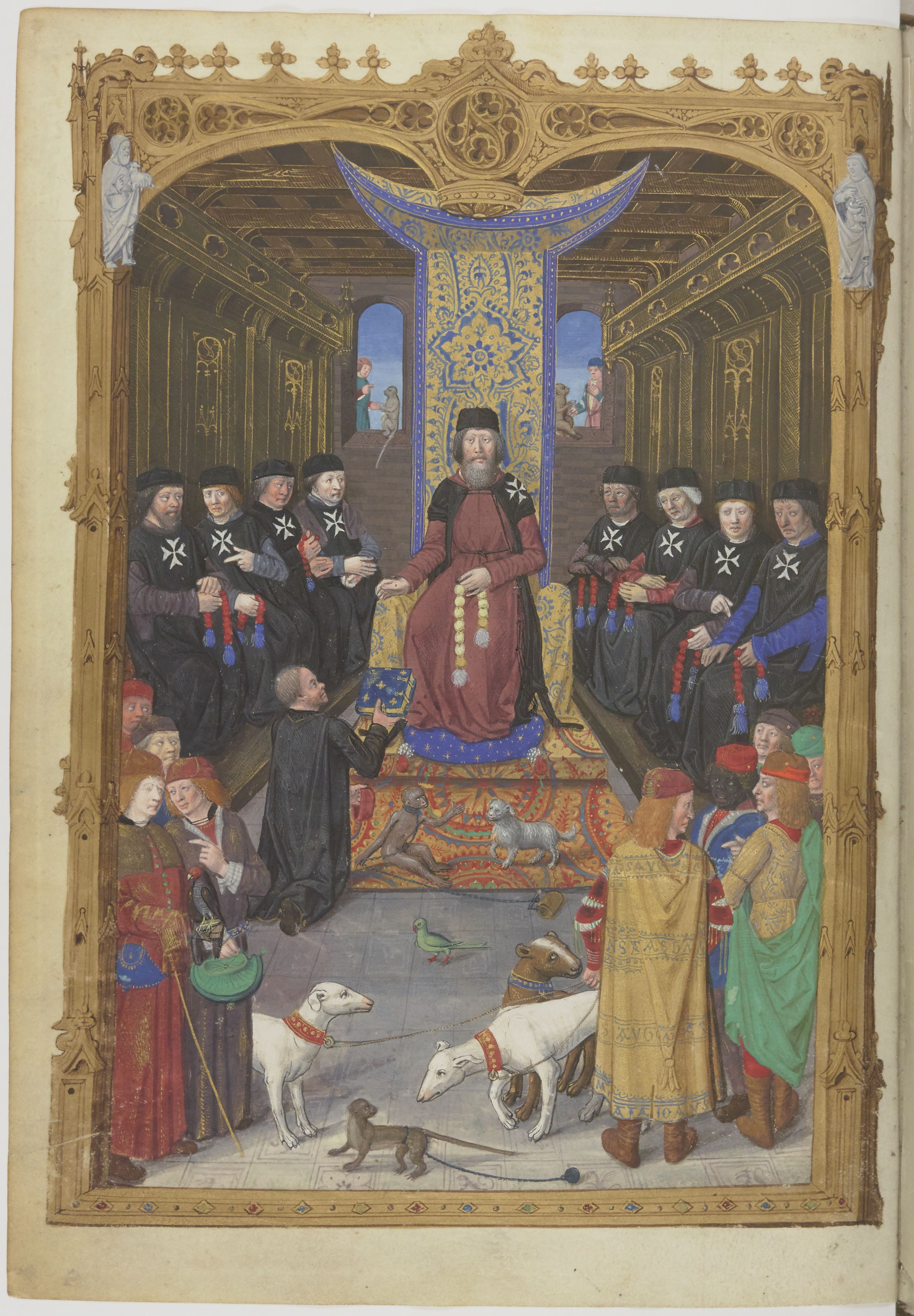
Grand Master Pierre d'Aubusson with senior knights, wearing the "Rhodian cross" on their habits. Dedicatory miniature in Gestorum Rhodie obsidionis commentarii (account of the Siege of Rhodes of 1480), BNF Lat 6067 fol. 3v, dated 1483/4.

Pierre d'Aubusson (1423 – 3 July 1503) was a Grand Master of the Order of Saint John of Jerusalem, and a zealous opponent of the Ottoman Empire.

Pierre probably joined the Knights of Saint John in 1444 or 1445, and then left for Rhodes.

== Early life and education ==
Pierre d'Aubusson was born in the castle of Le Monteil (today: Le Monteil-au-Vicomte, in the French department of Creuse), the fifth son of Jean d'Aubusson. His older brother Antoine had a brilliant career serving Charles VII and Louis XI, and the other three brothers became bishops.

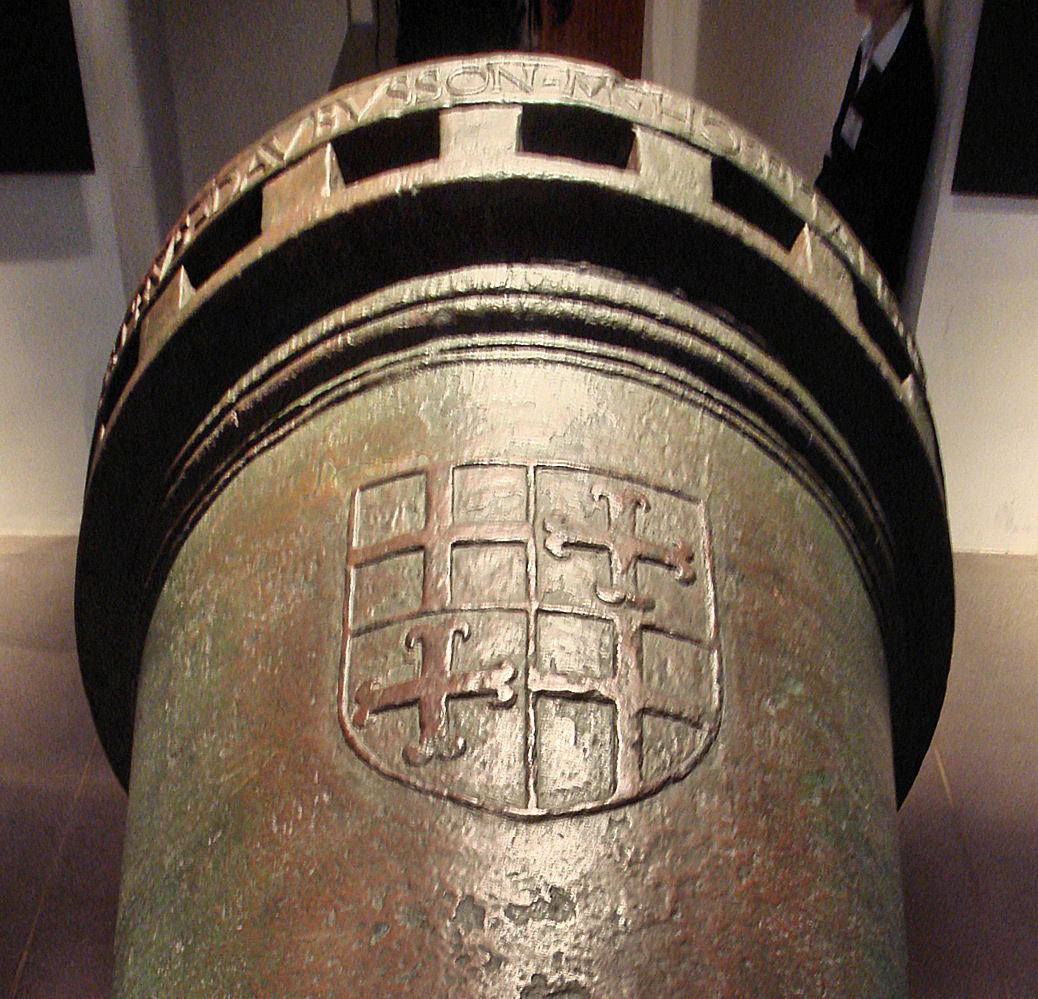
Arms of Pierre d'Aubusson, quartered with those of the Knights of Saint John, on a bombard commissioned by him. The top inscription reads: "F. PETRUS DAUBUSSON M HOSPITALIS IHER"

The alleged story of his youth to 1444, which has appeared in print since the 17th century, is unreliable. It derives from the fertile imagination of R.P. Dominique Bouhours, a Jesuit who published a biography of Pierre d'Aubusson (Paris, Mabre-Cramoisy, 1677) at the behest of Marshall d'Aubusson-La Feuillade.

== Grand Prior ==
Pierre d'Aubusson was elected "Grand Prior" of the "Langue d'Auvergne" in early 1476. In June 1476, he was elected Grand Master of the Order, having been a very close associate of a previous Grand Master, Piero Raimondo Zacosta, and responsible for the repair and modernization of the fortifications of the city of Rhodes, the other castles of the Order on the islands of the Dodecanese, and the Château Saint Pierre (formerly Halicarnasse, today Bodrum, Turkey).

== Siege of Rhodes ==
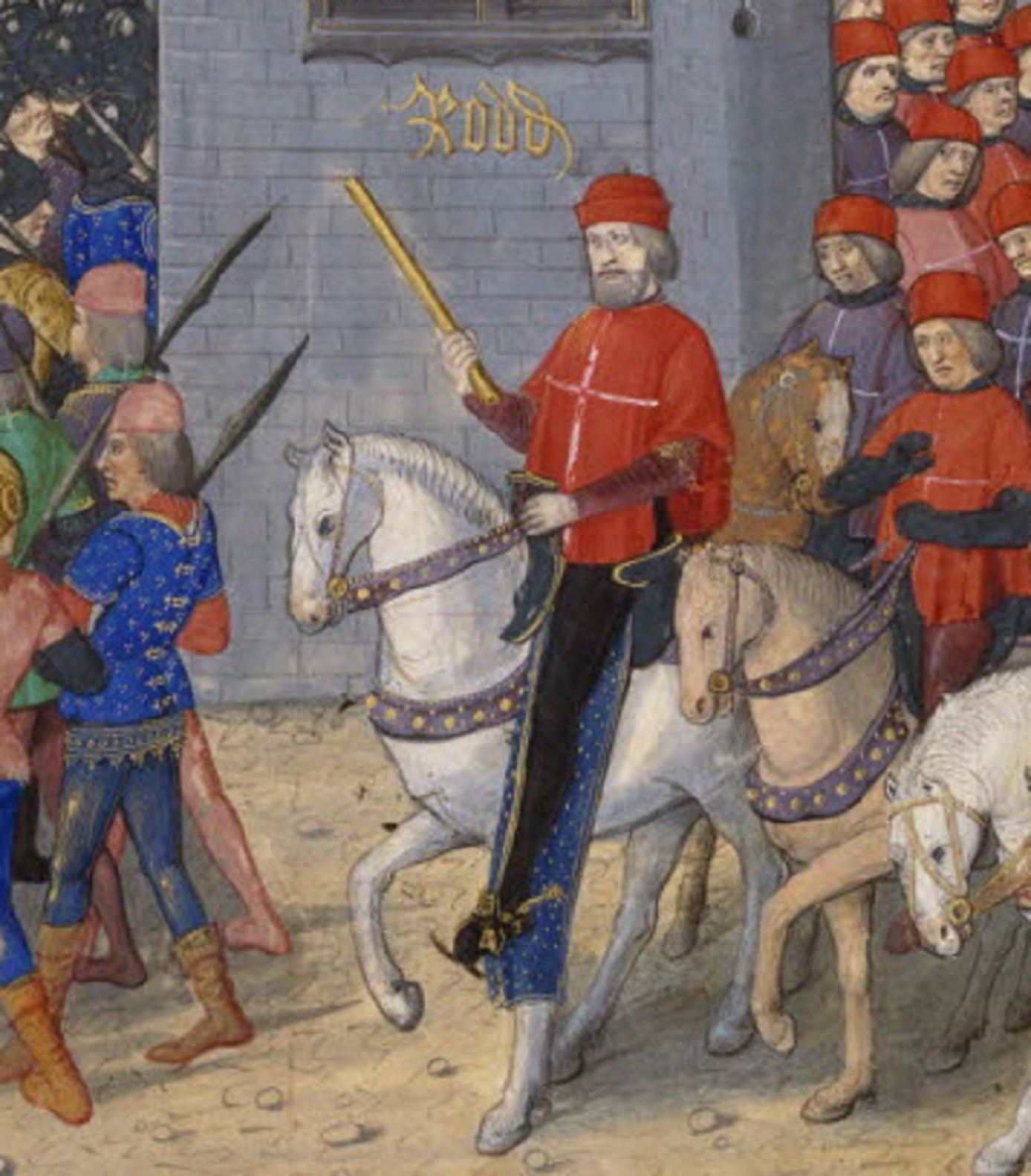
Miniature depicting Pierre d'Aubusson inspecting his soldiers, from the Gestorum Rhodie obsidionis commentarii

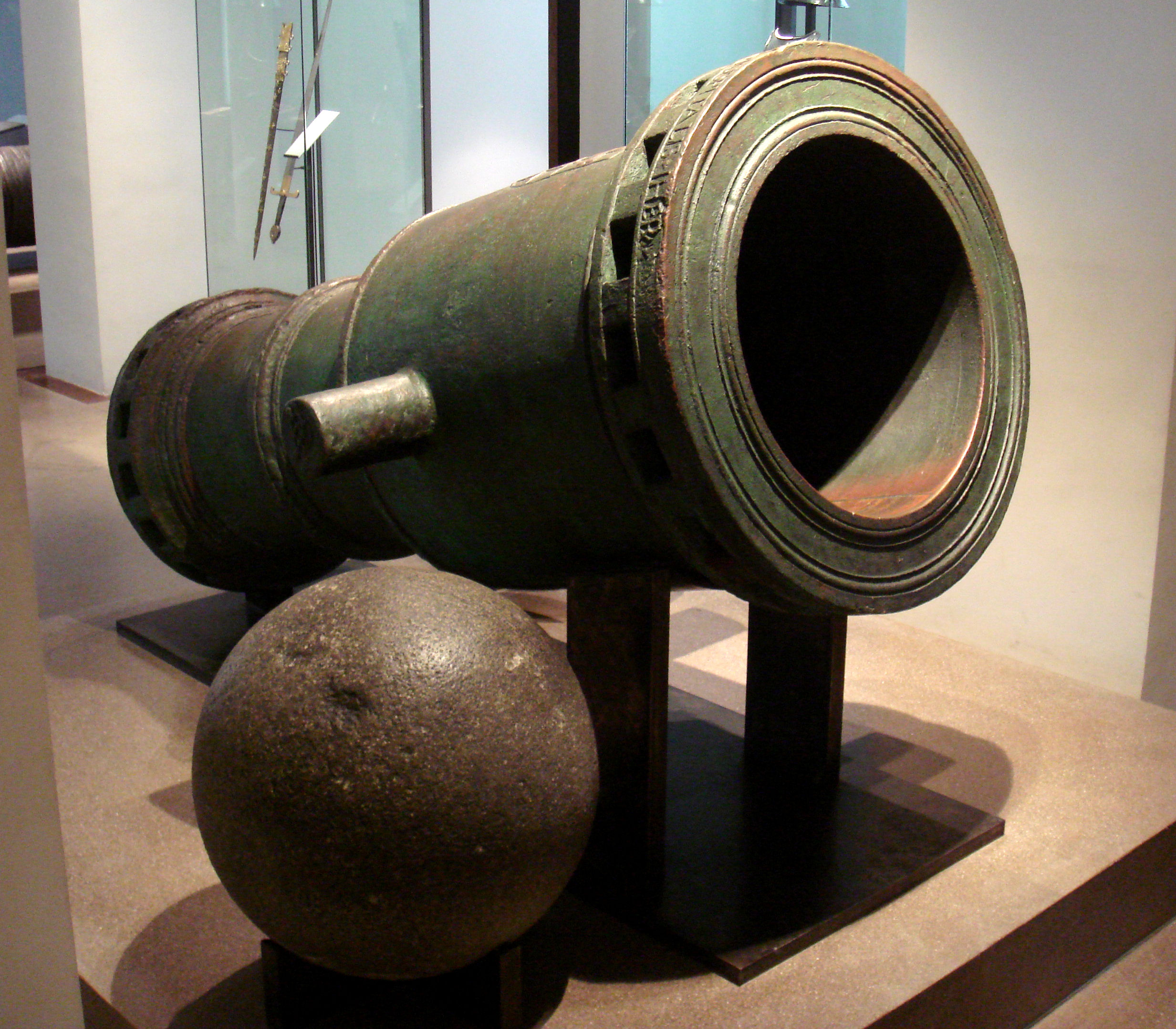
Bombard-Mortar of the Knights of Saint John of Jerusalem, Rhodes, 1480–1500. This is the largest known bombard in history. Founded at the request of Pierre d'Aubusson, the bombard was used for close defence of the walls (100–200 meters). It fired 260 kg granite balls. The bombard weighs 3,325 kg. Musée de l'Armée

Sultan Mehmed II began to threaten Europe. In May 1480 a large Ottoman fleet appeared before Rhodes, carrying an invading army of some 100,000 men under the command of Mesih Pasha (originally a Greek by the name of Michael Palaiologos who had converted to Islam after the conquest of Constantinople by the Turks).

The Knights were reinforced from France by 500 knights and 2000 soldiers under d'Aubusson's brother Antoine. The siege lasted until August. After three unsuccessful attempts against the city, the Turkish force was compelled to withdraw, leaving behind them 9000 dead. The siege, in which d'Aubusson was wounded three times, enhanced his renown throughout Europe.

Sultan Mehmed was furious and would have attacked the island again but for his death in 1481. His succession was disputed between his sons Bayezid and Cem. The latter, after his defeat by Bayezid, sought refuge at Rhodes under a safe-conduct from the Grand Master and the General Convent of the Order.

Rhodes not being considered secure, Cem with his own consent was sent to Bourganeuf in France where he was kept under the guard of Guy de Blanchefort, Pierre d'Aubusson's nephew.

Infuriated by the failure of Sir James Keating, Prior of the Order's Irish house, to send any help in the Siege, d'Aubusson ordered his removal and replacement by Marmaduke Lumley. However, he had underestimated Keating, an exceptionally combative and often violent man. He resisted all efforts to remove him and threw Lumley into prison, where he died. Not until 1491 was Keating expelled by the English Crown, which had grave suspicions about his loyalty.

== Guarding Cem ==
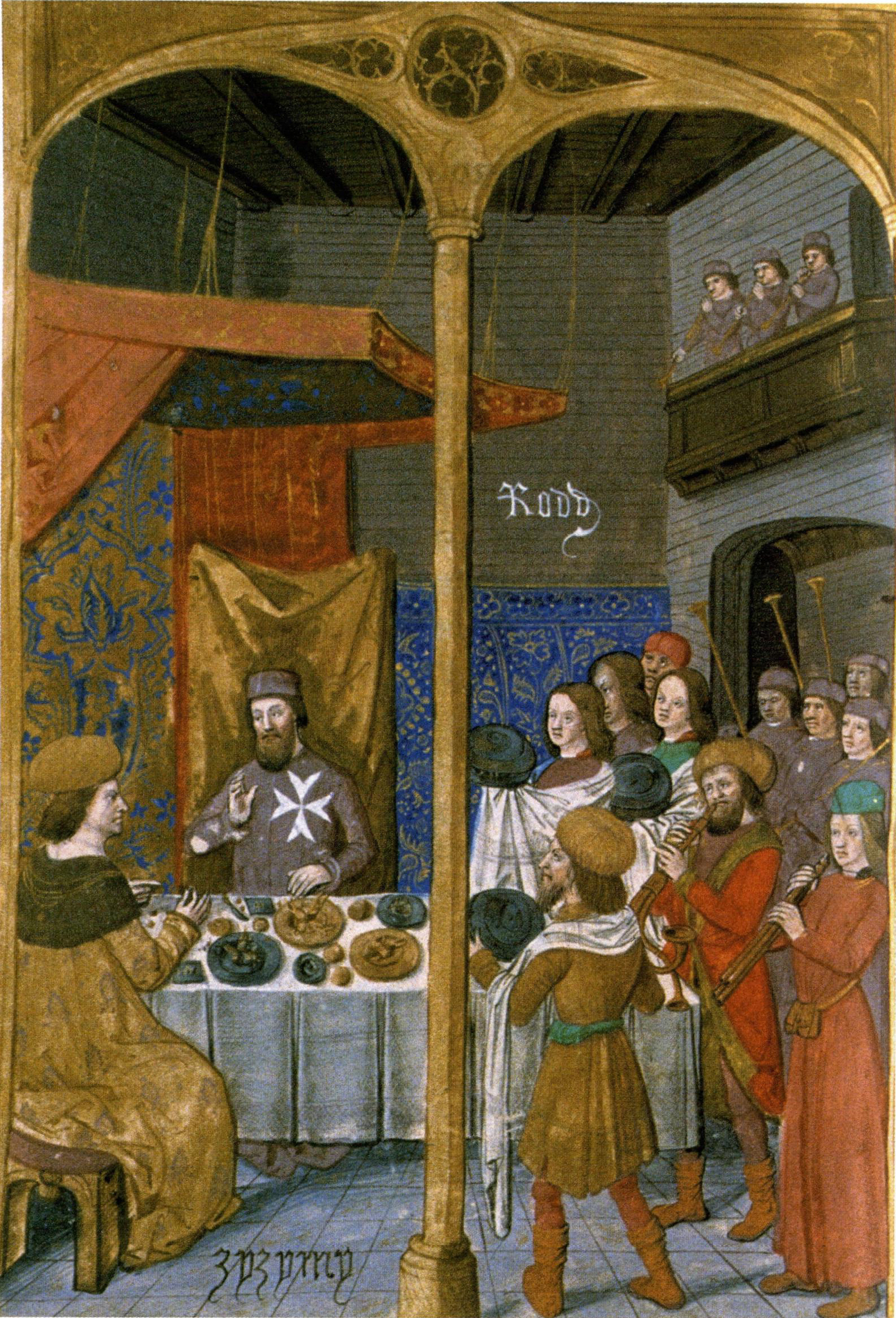
Manuscript depicting Pierre d'Aubusson with Cem, by Maître du cardinal de Bourbon in 1482

D'Aubusson accepted an annuity of 45,000 ducats from Bayezid II, in return for which he undertook to guard Cem in such a way as to prevent him from appealing to the Christian powers to aid him against his brother.

D'Aubusson's reward was a Cardinal's hat (1489) and the power to confer all benefices connected with the order without the sanction of the papacy. In addition, the Order of St. John received the assets of the Order of the Holy Sepulchre, which was merged into the Order of St. John, and a number of Italian commandries of the Knights of St. Lazarus.

== Later life ==
The remaining years of his life d'Aubusson spent attempting to restore discipline and zeal in his Order and to organize a grand crusade against the Turks. The age of the Renaissance, with Rodrigo Borgia on the throne of St. Peter, was, however, not favourable to such an enterprise.

The death of Cem in 1495 had removed the most formidable weapon available against the Sultan. And when in 1501 d'Aubusson led an expedition against Mytilene, dissension among his motley host rendered this enterprise wholly abortive. His last years were embittered by chagrin at his failure, which was hardly compensated by his success in extirpating Judaism in Rhodes, by expelling all adult Jews and forcibly baptizing their children.

== Gallery ==
Portrait depicting the victory of Pierre d'Aubusson at Rhodes, from the Bibliothèque nationale de France

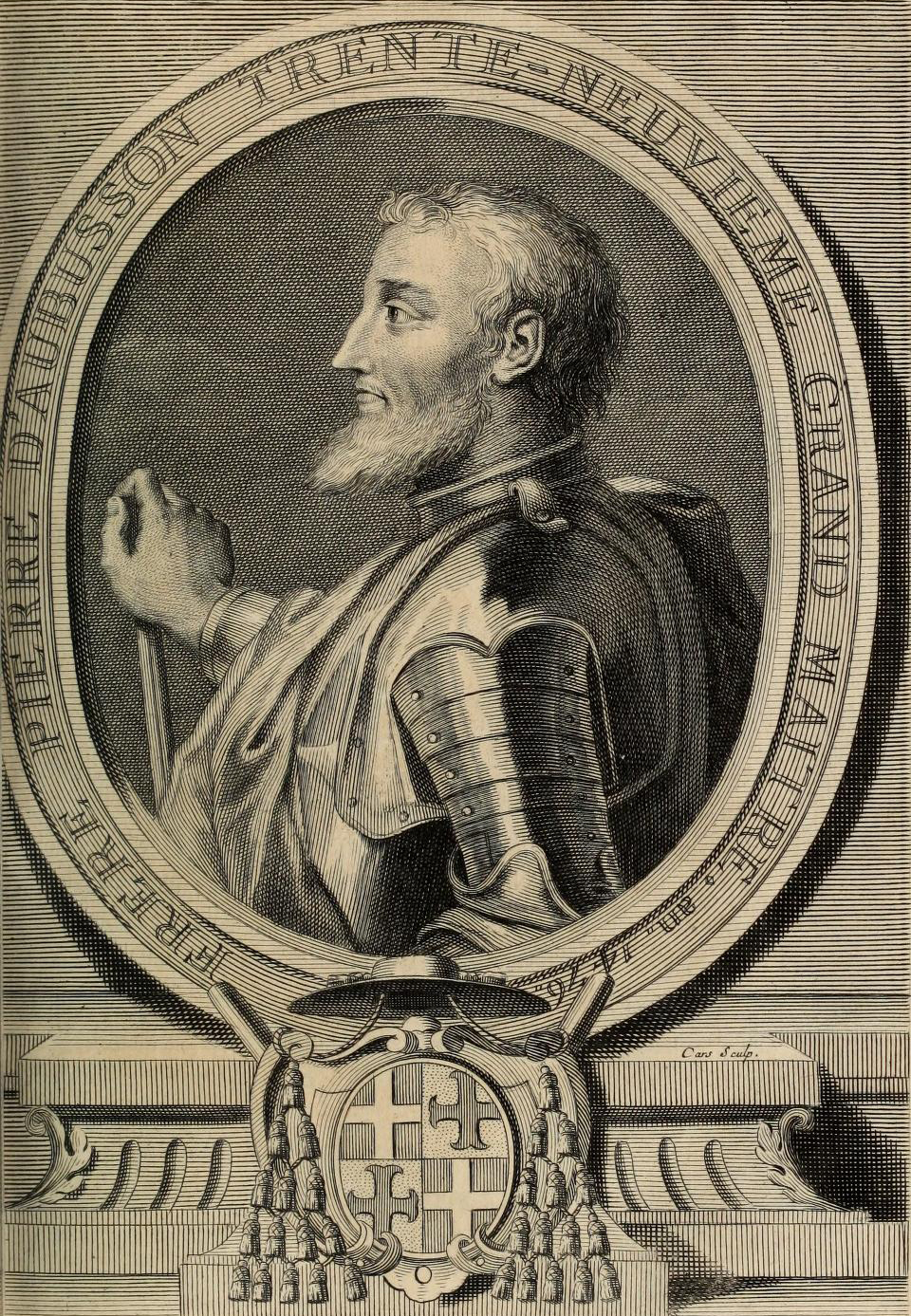
Portrait of Pierre d'Aubusson, from the 1726 "Histoire des Chevaliers Hospitaliers de S. Jean de Jerusalem - appellez depuis les Chevaliers de Rhodes, et aujourd'hui les Chevaliers de Malthe"

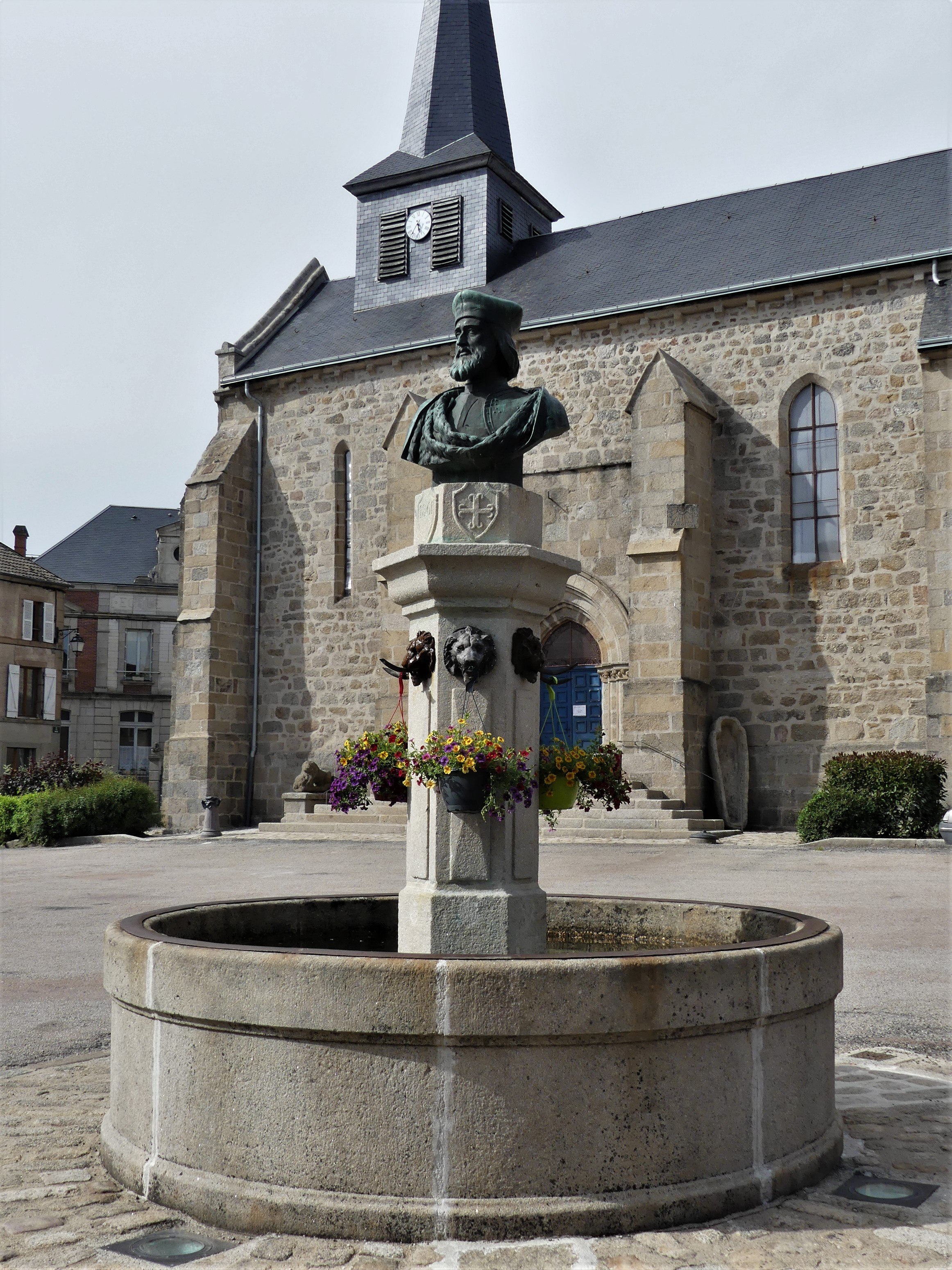
Bust of Pierre d'Aubusson from Vallière, France

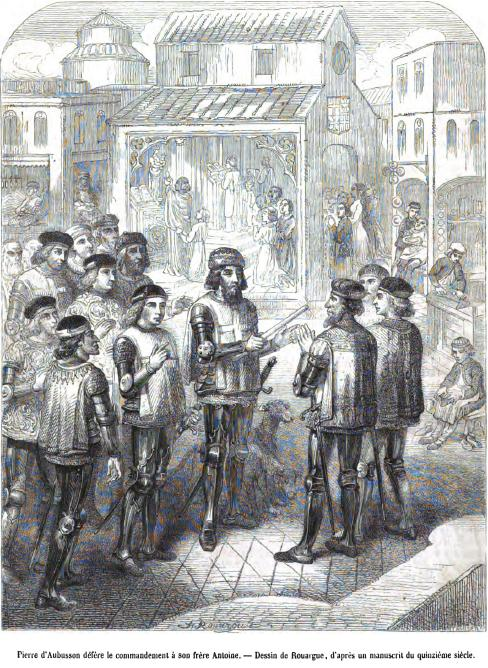
Depiction of Pierre d'Aubusson handing over command to his brother Antoine, by Rouargue, based on a 15th century manuscript

19th century French portrait of Pierre d'Aubusson, from the Boyer collection

19th century French depiction of Pierre d'Aubusson, from the Boyer collection

19th century French depiction of Pierre d'Aubusson, from the Boyer collection

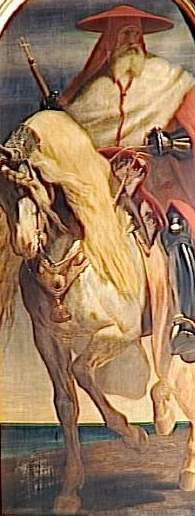
Pierre d'Aubusson on horseback, as painted by Edouard Odier in 1841

== Notes ==
Preceded by Giovanni Battista Orsini	Grand Master of the Knights Hospitaller; 1476–1503	Succeeded by Emery d'Amboise
