= Le Monteil-au-Vicomte =

Commune in Nouvelle-Aquitaine, France

- Commune
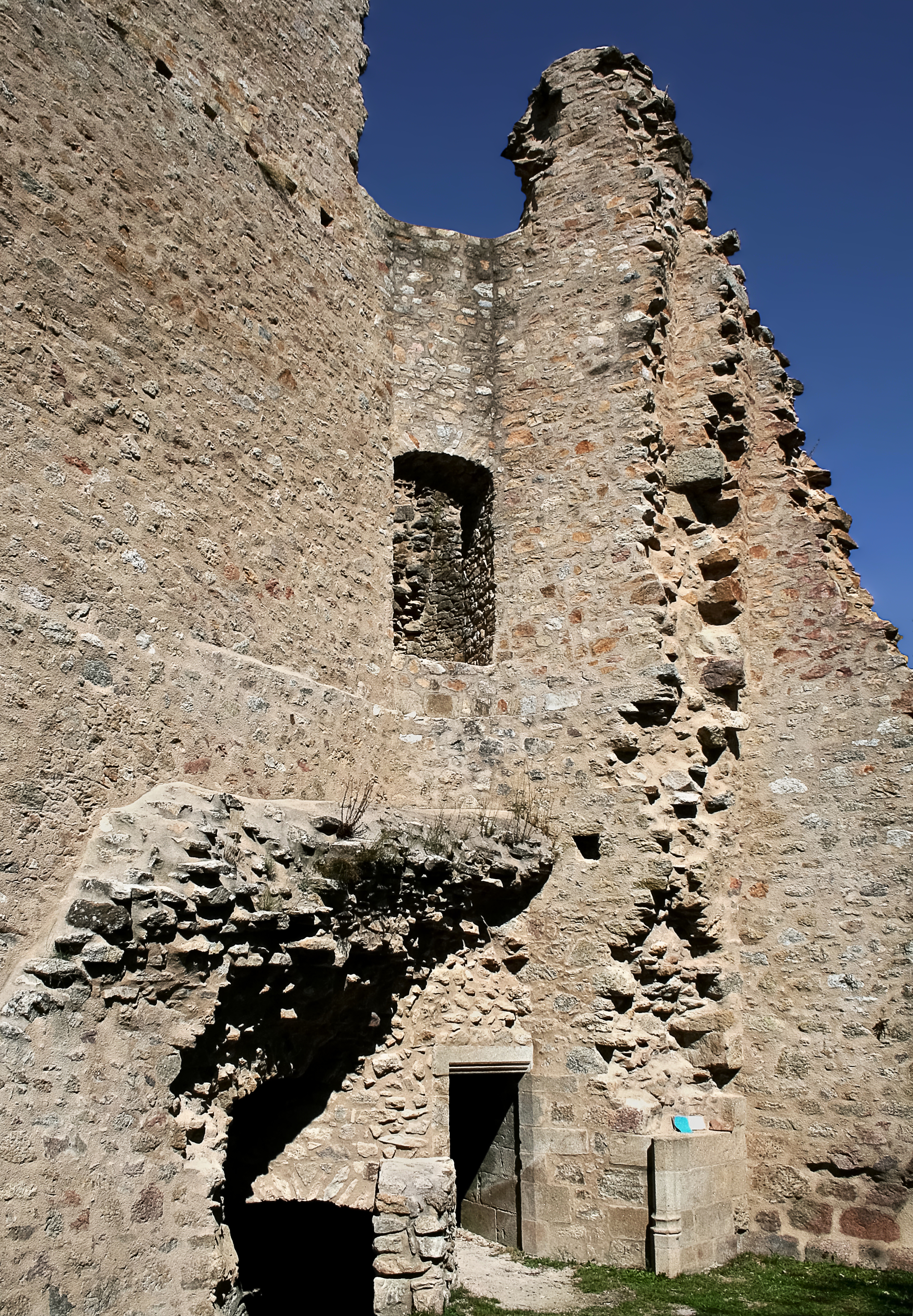
- Ruins of the chateau

- Coat of arms
- Location of Le Monteil-au-Vicomte
- Location within France Location within Nouvelle-Aquitaine
- Coordinates: 45°55′52″N 1°56′16″E
- Country: France
- Region: Nouvelle-Aquitaine
- Department: Creuse
- Arrondissement: Guéret
- Canton: Felletin
- Intercommunality: CC Creuse Sud Ouest

Government
  - Mayor (2020–2026): Christian Meyer
- Area^{1}: 14.4 km^{2} (5.6 sq mi)
- Highest elevation: 683 m (2,241 ft)
- Lowest elevation: 505 m (1,657 ft)
- Population (2023): 215
  - Density: 14.9/km^{2} (38.7/sq mi)
- Time zone: UTC+01:00 (CET)
  - Summer (DST): UTC+02:00 (CEST)
- INSEE/Postal code: 23134 /23460
- ^{1} French Land Register data, which excludes lakes, ponds, glaciers > 1 km^{2} (0.386 sq mi or 247 acres) and river estuaries.

Le Monteil-au-Vicomte (French pronunciation: [lə mɔ̃tɛj o vikɔ̃t]; Occitan: Grand Montelh) is a commune in the Creuse department in the Nouvelle-Aquitaine region in central France.

== Geography ==
An area of lakes, forestry and farming comprising a small village and several hamlets, situated by the banks of the Thaurion river, some 12 miles (19 km) west of Aubusson, at the junction of the D3, D36 and the D37 roads. The commune is within the boundaries of the natural park of the Millevaches (1000 lakes, not cows).

== Population ==
Historical population
| Year | Pop. | ±% p.a. |
|---|---|---|
| 1968 | 289 | — |
| 1975 | 281 | −0.40% |
| 1982 | 287 | +0.30% |
| 1990 | 248 | −1.81% |
| 1999 | 266 | +0.78% |
| 2007 | 225 | −2.07% |
| 2012 | 209 | −1.46% |
| 2017 | 201 | −0.78% |
| 2023 | 215 | +1.13% |
Source: INSEE

== Sights ==
- The thirteenth-century church at Le Monteil.
- The thirteenth-century church at Chatain.
- A ruined castle donjon, dating from the twelfth century.

== Personalities ==
- Pierre d'Aubusson (1423 - 30 June 1503), Grand Master of the order of St. John of Jerusalem (the Knights Hospitaller) was born at the castle.

== See also ==
- Communes of the Creuse department
