= Roger de Pins =

Grandmaster of the Knights Hospitaller (1294–1365)

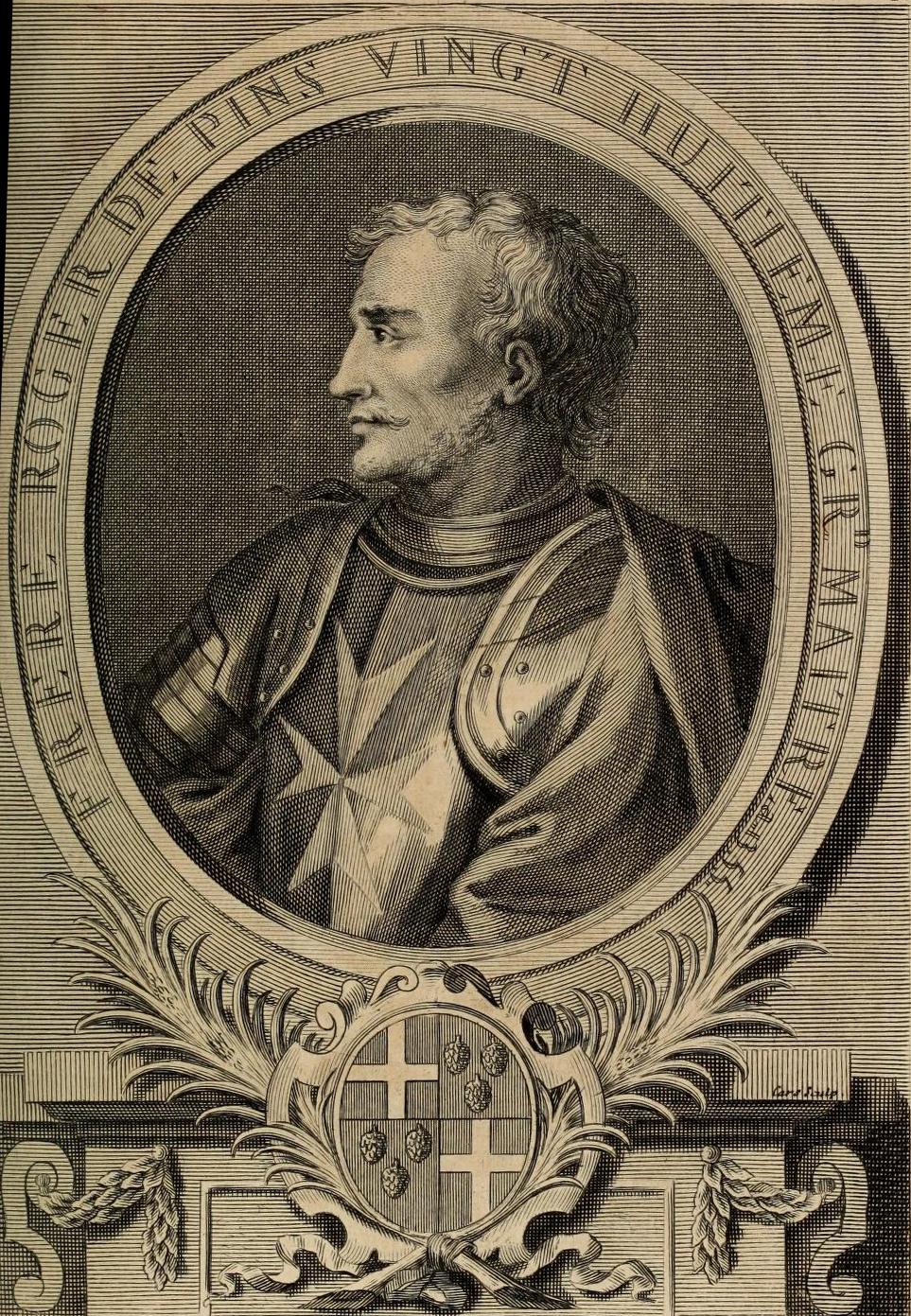

Grand Master of the Order of Saint John
- In office 1355–1365
- Preceded by: Pierre de Corneillan
- Succeeded by: Raymond Berengar

Personal details
- Born: 1294
- Died: 28 May 1365 (aged 70–71)
- Profession: Grandmaster of the Knights of St. John

Military service
- Allegiance: (Sovereign Military Order of Malta) Order of Saint John

Roger de Pins (1294 – 28 May 1365) was the grand master of the Knights Hospitaller from 1355 to 1365.

== Biography ==
Coat of arms of grand master of the Knights Hospitaller Roger de Pins

Little is known about de Pins's early life besides the fact that he came from Provence. Born in 1294, Roger de Pins came from a prominent family in the Knights Hospitaller, which included Odon de Pins, who served as grand master of the order from 1294 to 1296, and Giraud de Pins, who served as the papal appointed leader in Rhodes from 1317 to 1319 when there was conflict around the grandmaster Foulques de Villaret.

He was elected grand master in September of 1355, succeeding Pierre de Corneillan. Soon after his accession, Pope Innocent VI called an assembly in Avignon, in which he imposed reform upon the Knights Hospitaller. The reform, however, also undermined the authority of de Pins and showed papal favor to an opponent of his, Juan Fernández de Heredia.

In 1356, James of Piedmont, titular Prince of Achaea, proposed selling his title as Prince of Achaea to the pope. The pope considered buying it for the Hospitallers, but by the time the Hospitaller delegation arrived in Avignon in 1357, the titular Latin Emperor Robert II had refused to accept the deal, causing it to fall through.

== Legacy ==
Roger de Pins is primarily remembered for his generosity and compassion when he served as grand master of the order. It is said that during his reign Rhodes was hit by plague and famine, and de Pins provided for the people, only keeping what he needed to live.

Preceded by Pierre de Corneillan	Grand Master of the Knights Hospitaller; 1355–1365	Succeeded by Raymond Berengar
