= Fabrizio del Carretto =

Grand Master of the Knights Hospitaller (1455–1521)

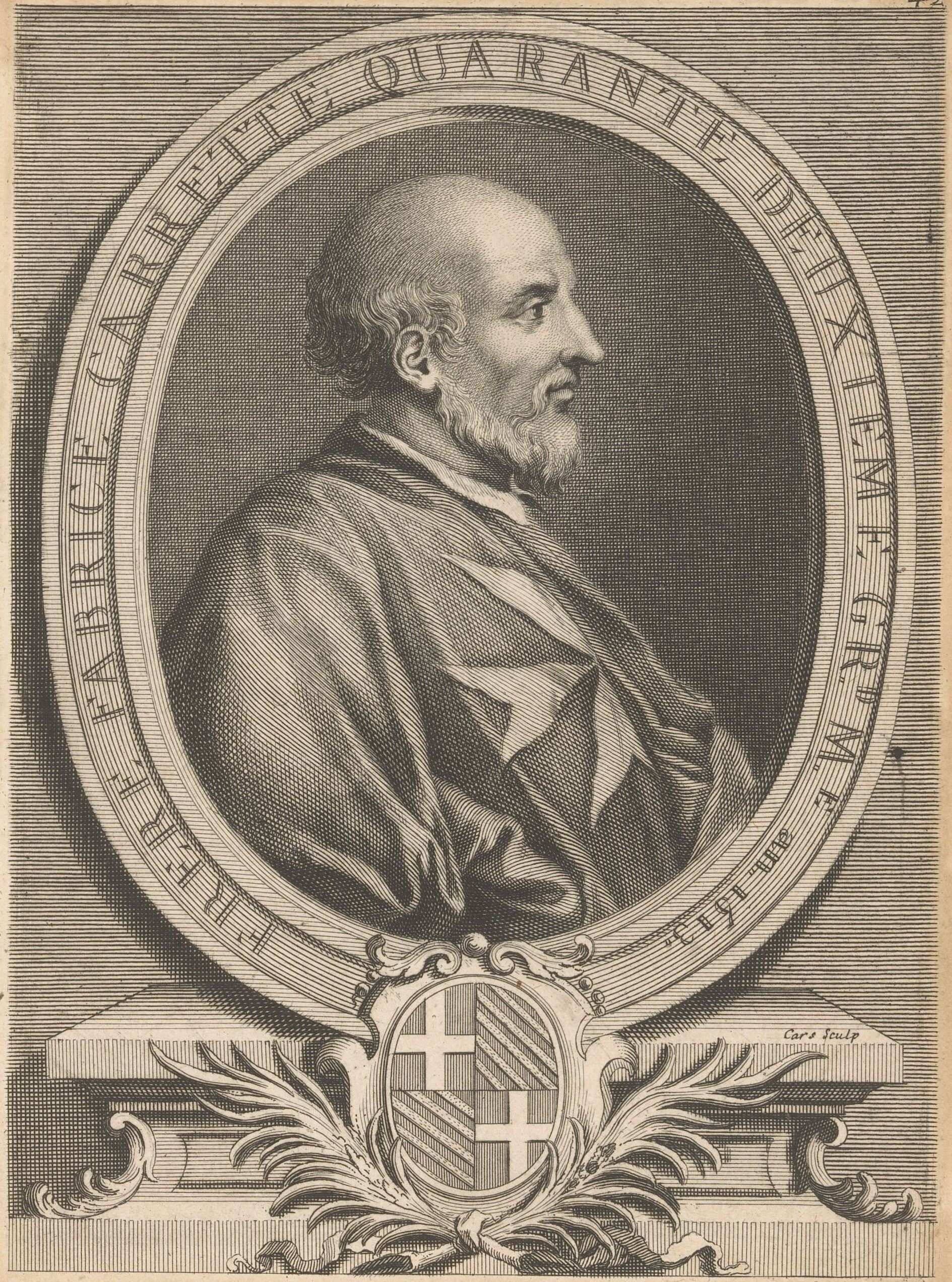

Grand Master of the Knights Hospitaller
- In office 13 December 1513 – 10 January 1521
- Preceded by: Guy de Blanchefort
- Succeeded by: Philippe Villiers de L'Isle-Adam

Personal details
- Born: 1455 Finale Ligure
- Died: 10 January 1521 (aged 65–66) Rhodes

Military service
- Allegiance: (Sovereign Military Order of Malta) Knights Hospitaller

Fabrizio del Carretto (1455 – 10 January 1521) was an Italian nobleman and the 43rd Grand Master of the Knights Hospitaller from 1513 to 1521.

== Biography ==
Carretto was born in Finale Ligure in Liguria in 1455, the fourth child of Giovanni del Carretto, Marquis of Finale, and of his wife, Valentina Adorno, daughter of Barnaba Adorno, Doge of Genoa. His older brother was Cardinal Carlo Domenico del Carretto.

Having entered the Knights Hospitaller at a young age, Carretto spent some years in Rhodes but in 1491 he returned to Italy, where he obtained from Pope Innocent VIII the commandry of Santa Maria of the Temple of the Holy Cross in Milan.

An able organizer, Carretto was repeatedly instructed by the order to set up galleys and ships in Genoa to be used in the defence of Rhodes, and in 1500 he was appointed captain of the galleys. However, in 1502 he settled in Rome because the Grand Master made him Procurator General of the Order to the Holy See. In 1505, he became bailiff of St. Euphemia. In 1509, he became Admiral of the Order and, consequently, head of the Italian Langue. He was entrusted with important tasks by Pope Julius II, whom he accompanied to the Fifth Council of the Lateran in 1512. He then returned to Rhodes, where he conducted two ships in the service of the order.

On 24 November 1513 Grand Master Guy de Blanchefort died near the island of Zakynthos, but the news did not reach Rhodes until 13 December. Two days later, on 15 December, Carretto was elected Grand Master. In the seven years of his government, he strengthened the defences of the city of Rhodes and the other islands of the Dodecanese, providing the fortresses with abundant food supplies and artillery.

Carretto died in Rhodes, after a short illness, on 10 January 1521. He was the last Grand Master of the Knights Hospitaller to die in Rhodes, and was buried in the Church of St John of the Collachium, the order's conventual church. During the reign of his successor Philippe Villiers de L'Isle-Adam, the order lost Rhodes to the Ottoman Empire and later moved to Malta in 1530.

Coat of arms of Fabrizio del Carretto (Salles des Croisades)

== Notes ==
Preceded by Guy de Blanchefort	Grand Master of the Knights Hospitaller; 1513–1521	Succeeded by Philippe Villiers de L'Isle-Adam
