= Emery d'Amboise =

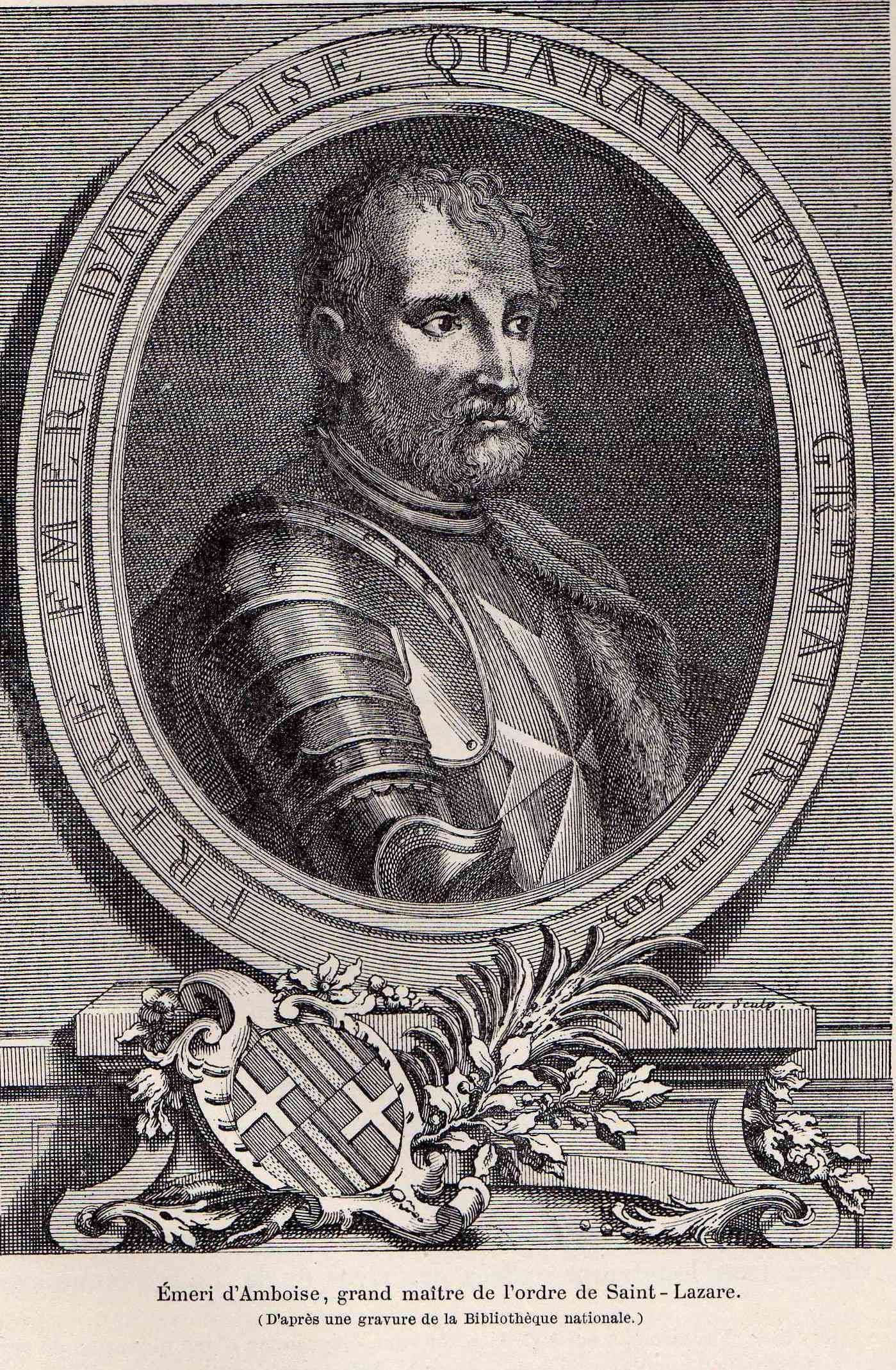

Grand Master of the Knights Hospitaller
- In office 10 July 1503 – 13 November 1512
- Preceded by: Pierre d'Aubusson
- Succeeded by: Guy de Blanchefort

Personal details
- Born: 1434 Chaumont-sur-Loire, France
- Died: 13 November 1512 (aged 77–78) Rhodes

Military service
- Allegiance: (Sovereign Military Order of Malta) Knights Hospitaller

Emery d'Amboise (1434 – 13 November 1512) was Grand Master of the Knights Hospitaller from 1503 to 1512. He was the 41st Grand Master. He succeeded to Pierre d'Aubusson.

== Early life ==
Emery d'Amboise was born in 1434 in the castle of Chaumont-sur-Loire, a stronghold of the powerful family of Amboise. He was the third son of Pierre d'Amboise (1408–1473), chamberlain of Charles VII and Louis XII and Anne of Bueil (1405–1458), daughter of Jean IV Bueil. His younger brother, George, was the future Cardinal d'Amboise, prime minister of Louis XII.

== Gallery ==
Coat of arms of Emery d'Amboise

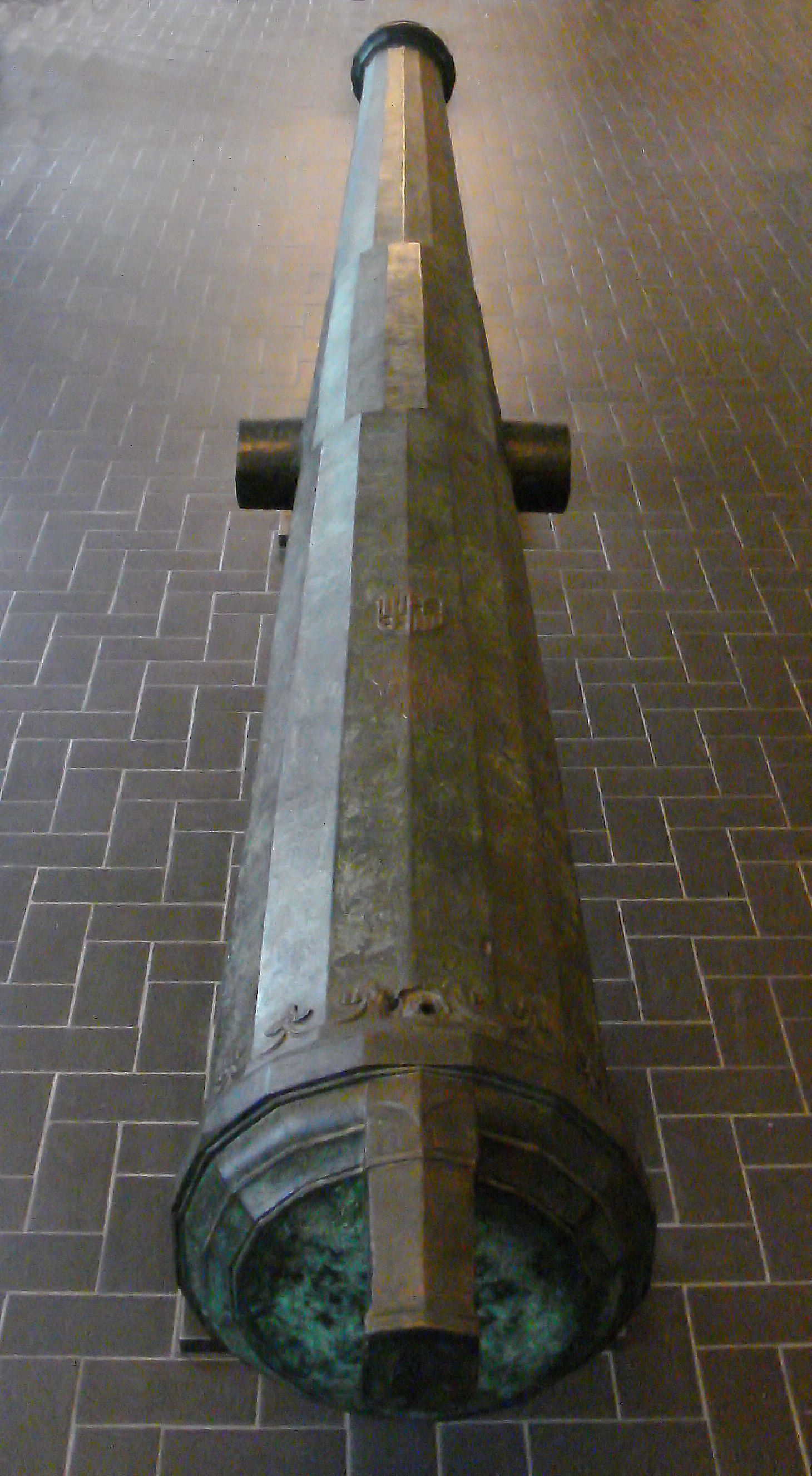
Grand culverin of the Knights Hospitallers, 1500–1510, Rhodes. French work, caliber: 165 mm, length: 540 cm, weight: 3343 kg, ammunition: 15 kg iron ball. Arms of Emery d'Amboise. Given by Abdülaziz to Napoleon III in 1862

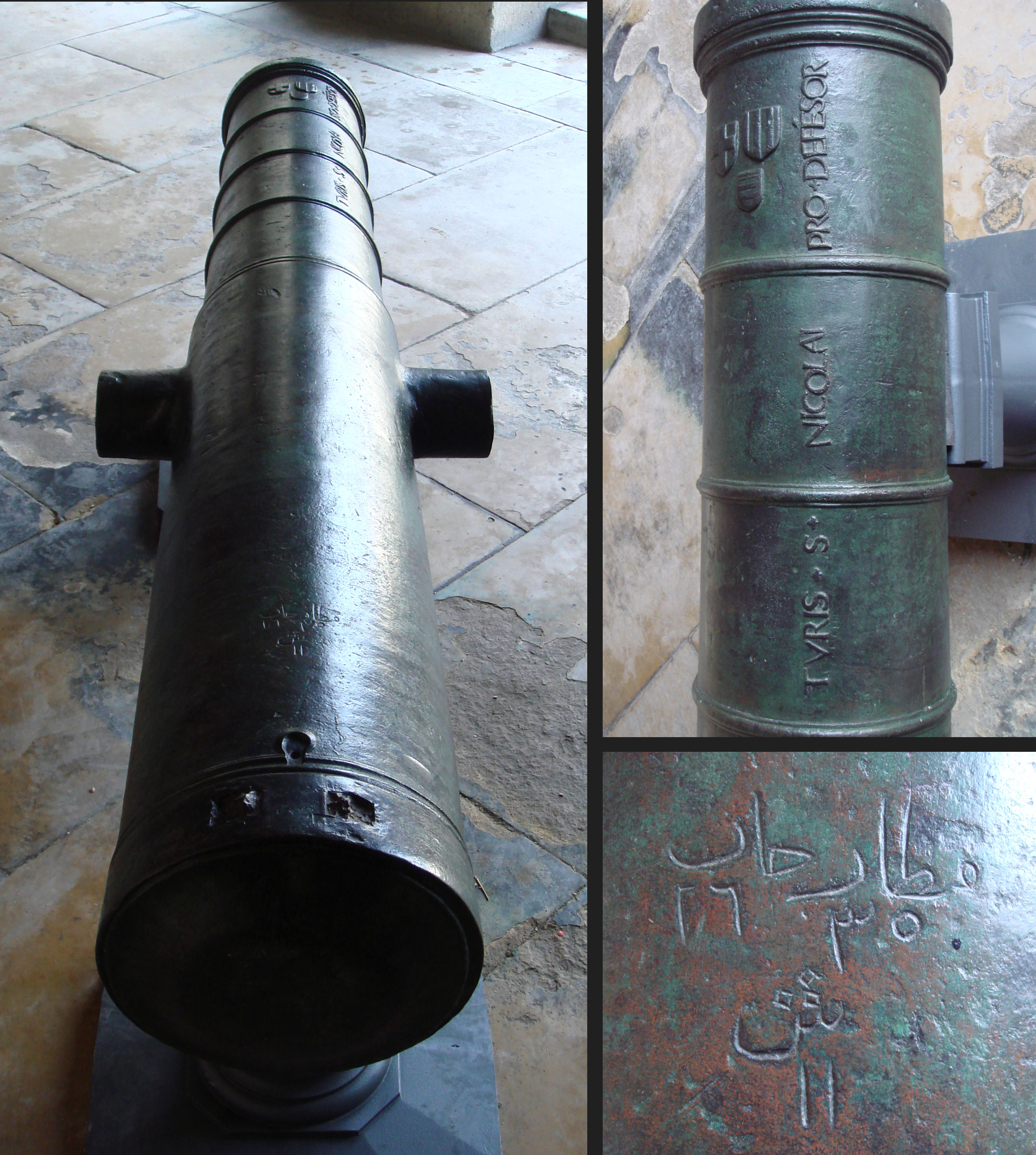
Cannon of the Hospitallers at Saint-Nicholas Tower (Tour Saint-Nicolas), 1510, Rhodes. Arms of Emery d'Amboise, with Arabic inscription. Latin inscription TURIS + S + NICOLAI + PRO + DEFESOR, "For the defense of Saint-Nicholas Tower". Caliber: 230 mm length: 255 cm weight:1427 kg.

== Notes ==
Preceded by Pierre d'Aubusson	Grand Master of the Knights Hospitaller; 1503–1512	Succeeded by Guy de Blanchefort
