= Pierre de Corneillan =

Grand Master of the Knights Hospitaller

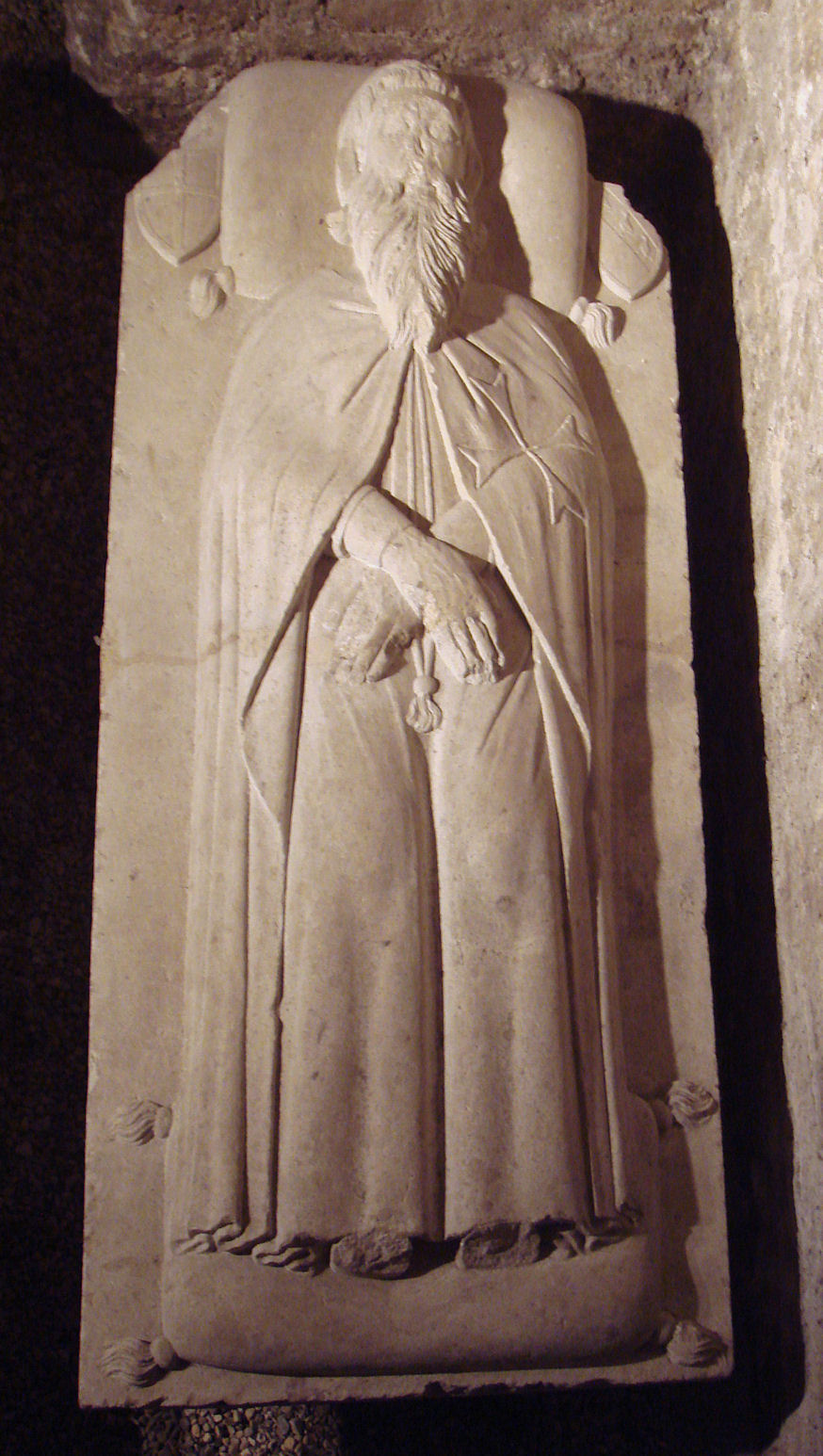
Tombstone of Pierre de Corneillan, Musée de Cluny, Paris.

Pierre de Corneillan (died 24 August 1355) was the Grand Prior of Saint-Gilles and the 4th Grand Master of the Order of St. John of Jerusalem in Rhodes, serving from1353 to 1355. His Blazon was: "Gules on a bend argent three Cornish choughs sable".

De Corneillan spent most of his brief rule (18 months) successfully resisting Pope Innocent VI's plans to relocate the Order’s seat from Rhodes to a location closer to Palestine and the Mamluk territories. His marble sarcophagus is preserved in the main hall of the Archaeological Museum of Rhodes.

Preceded by Dieudonné de Gozon	Grand Master of the Knights Hospitaller; 1353–1355	Succeeded by Roger de Pins
