= Giovanni Battista Orsini =

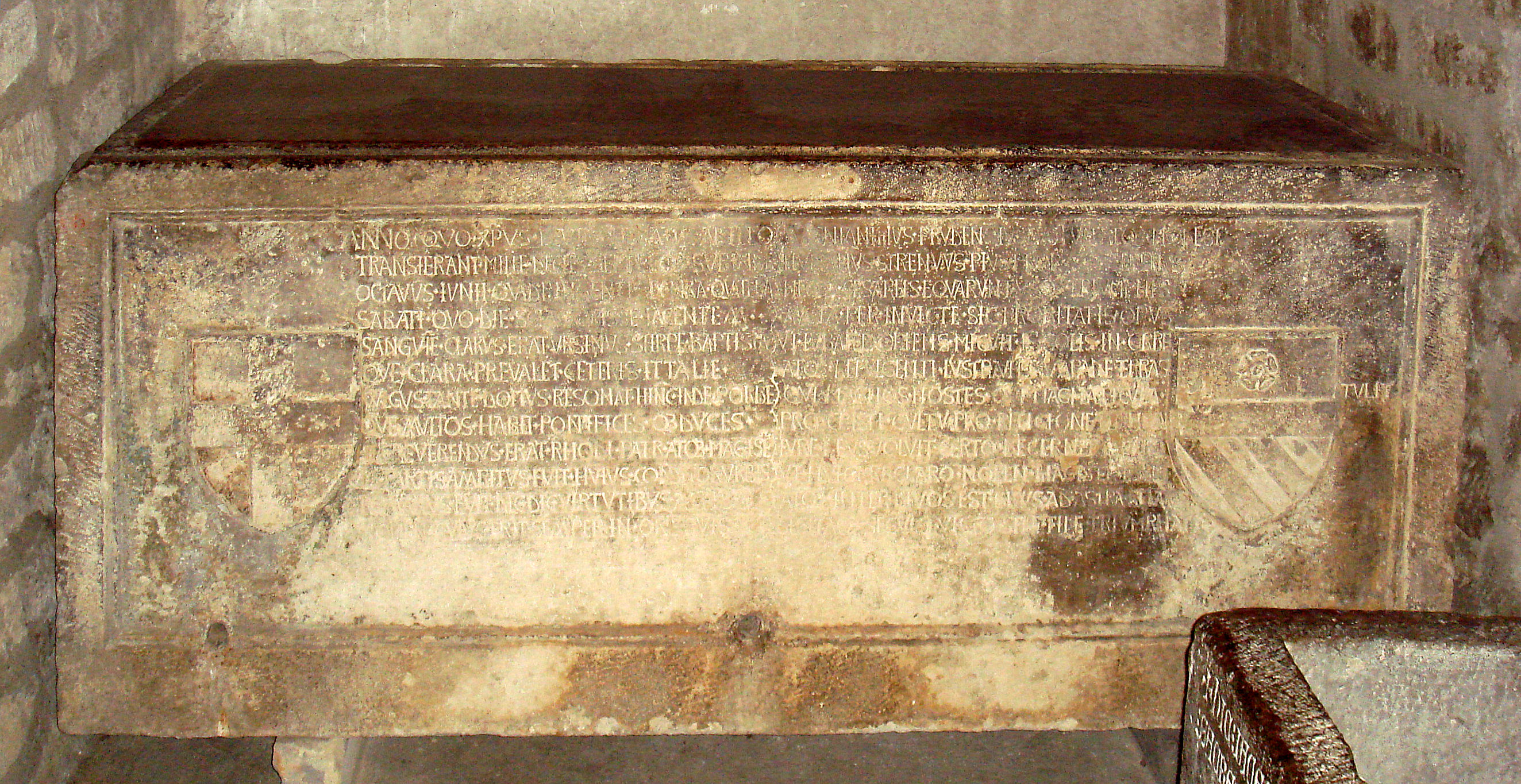
Tomb of Jean-Baptiste des Ursins, Rhodes. Musée de Cluny.

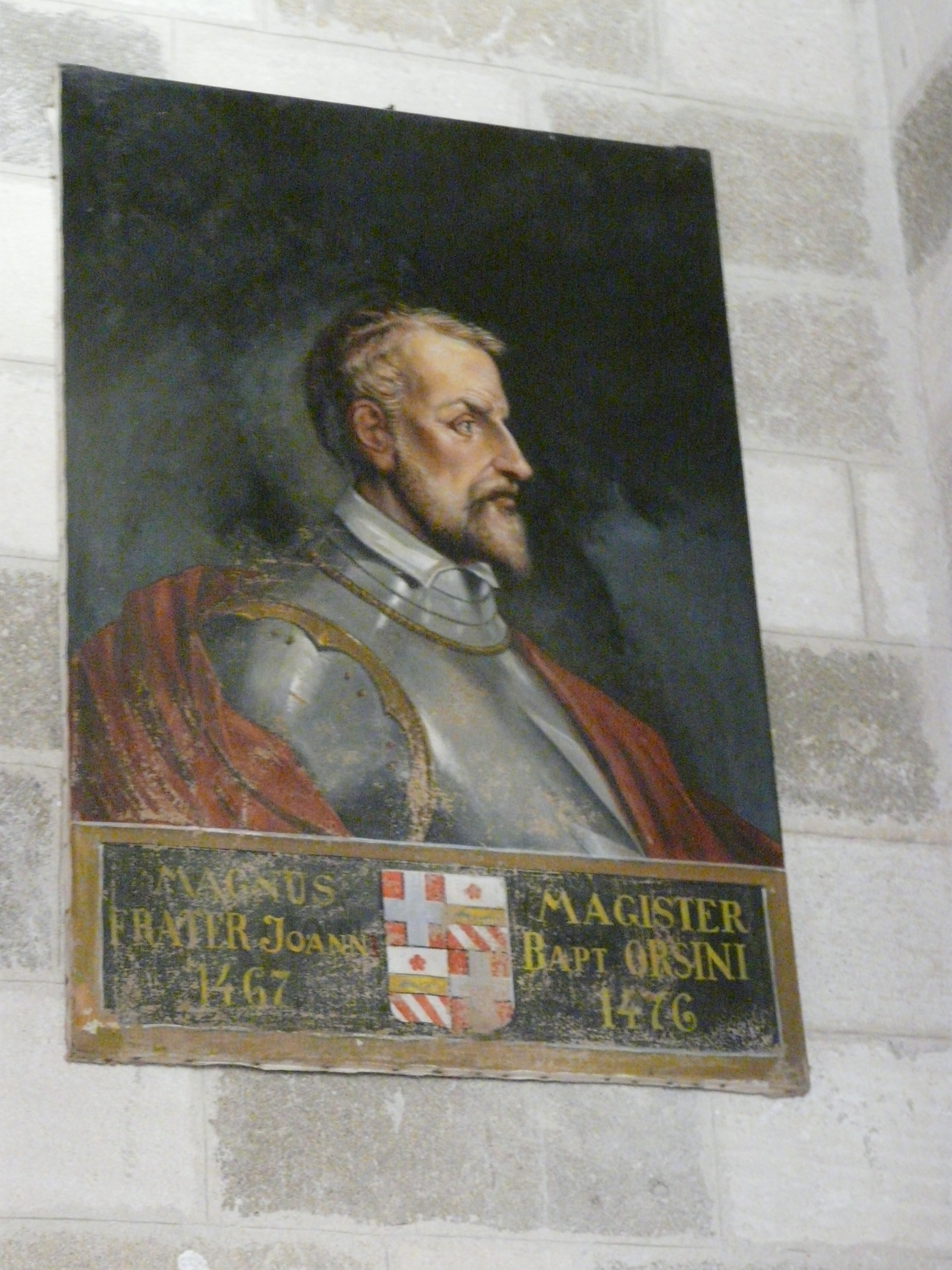
Image of the young 39th Grand Master of the Order of the Knights Hospitalier, 1467 - 1476, Giovanni Battista Orsini, (circa 1450 - 1503), Abbot of the Benedictine Monastery of San Salvadore Maggiore, diocese of Arezzo, since August 1477, Cardinal deacon since November 1483, participant in the conclaves of 1484 to elect Pope Innocent VIII and 1492 to elect Pope Alexander VI, but his properties were confiscated by such Pope, the father of Cesare Borgia, in January 1503, dying in prison, probably poisoned according to some pamphlets, on 22 February 1503

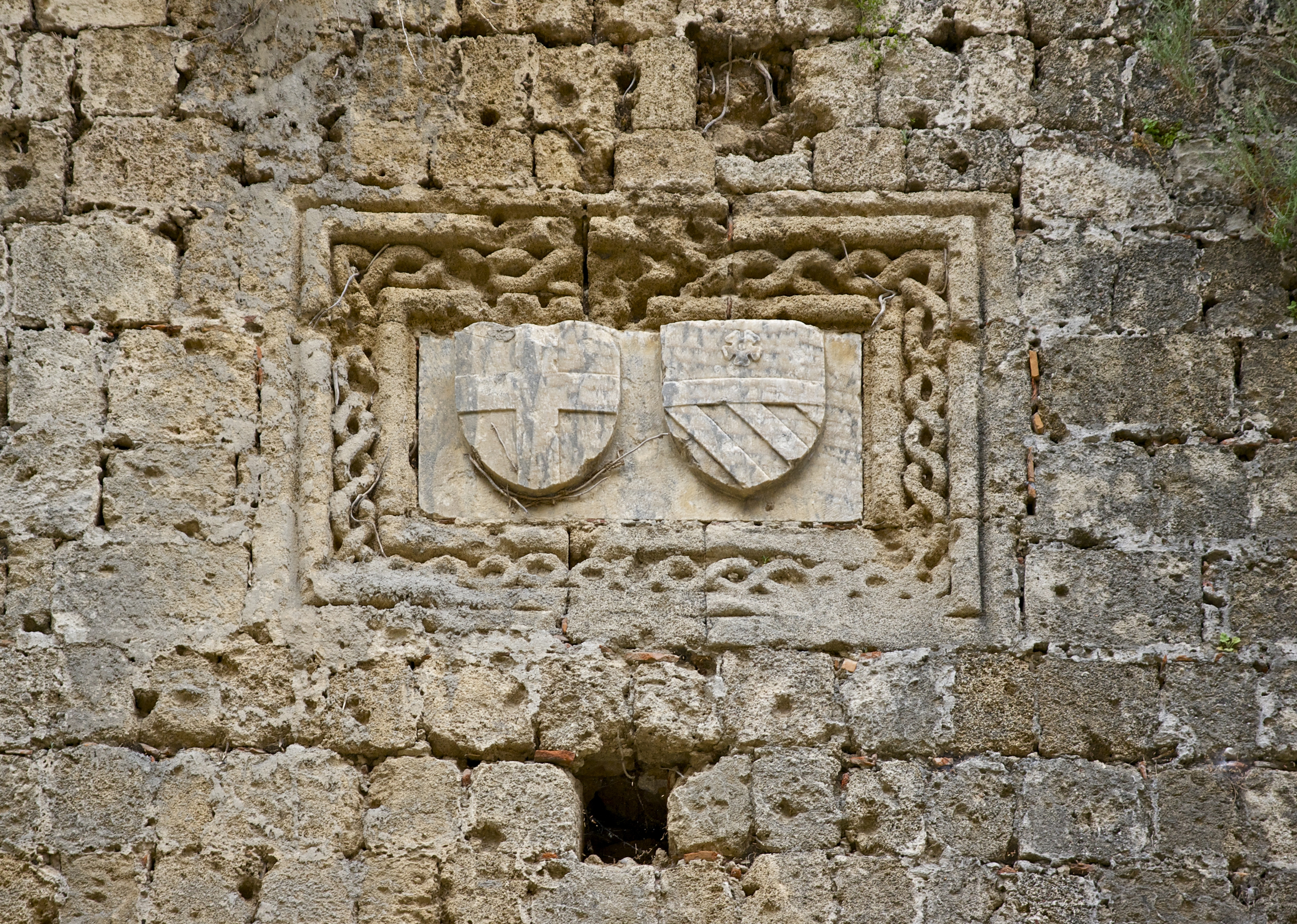
Coat of Arms of J.B. des Ursins, Grand-Master, on the walls of the castle at Rhodes, Greece.

Giovanni Battista Orsini, or Jean-Baptiste des Ursins, was the 39th Grand Master of the Order of the Knights Hospitaller from 1467 to 1476.

Preceded by Piero Raimondo Zacosta	Grand Master of the Knights Hospitaller; 1467–1476	Succeeded by Pierre d'Aubusson
