= Piero Raimondo Zacosta =

Grand Master of the Knights Hospitaller

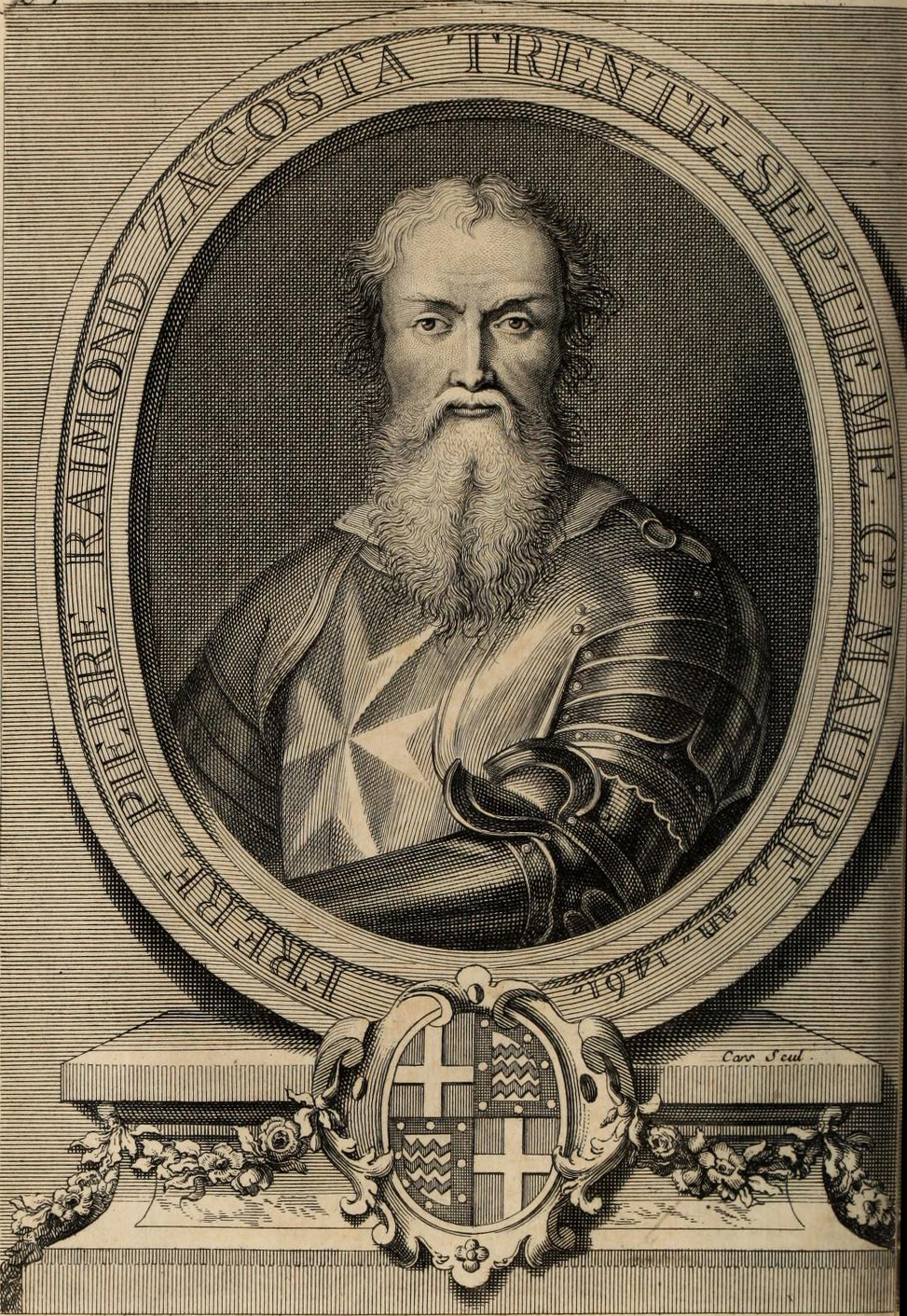
Piero Raimondo Zacosta 1461 to 1467

Piero Raimondo Zacosta (Catalan: Pere Ramon Sacosta; 1404 – 21 February 1467) was a Spanish knight of Aragon who served as the 38th Grand Master of the Order of the Knights Hospitaller, from 1461 - 1467.

Preceded by Jacques de Milly	Grand Master of the Knights Hospitaller; 1461–1467	Succeeded by Giovanni Battista Orsini
