= Dieudonné de Gozon =

Grand Master of the Knights of Rhodes from 1346 to 1353

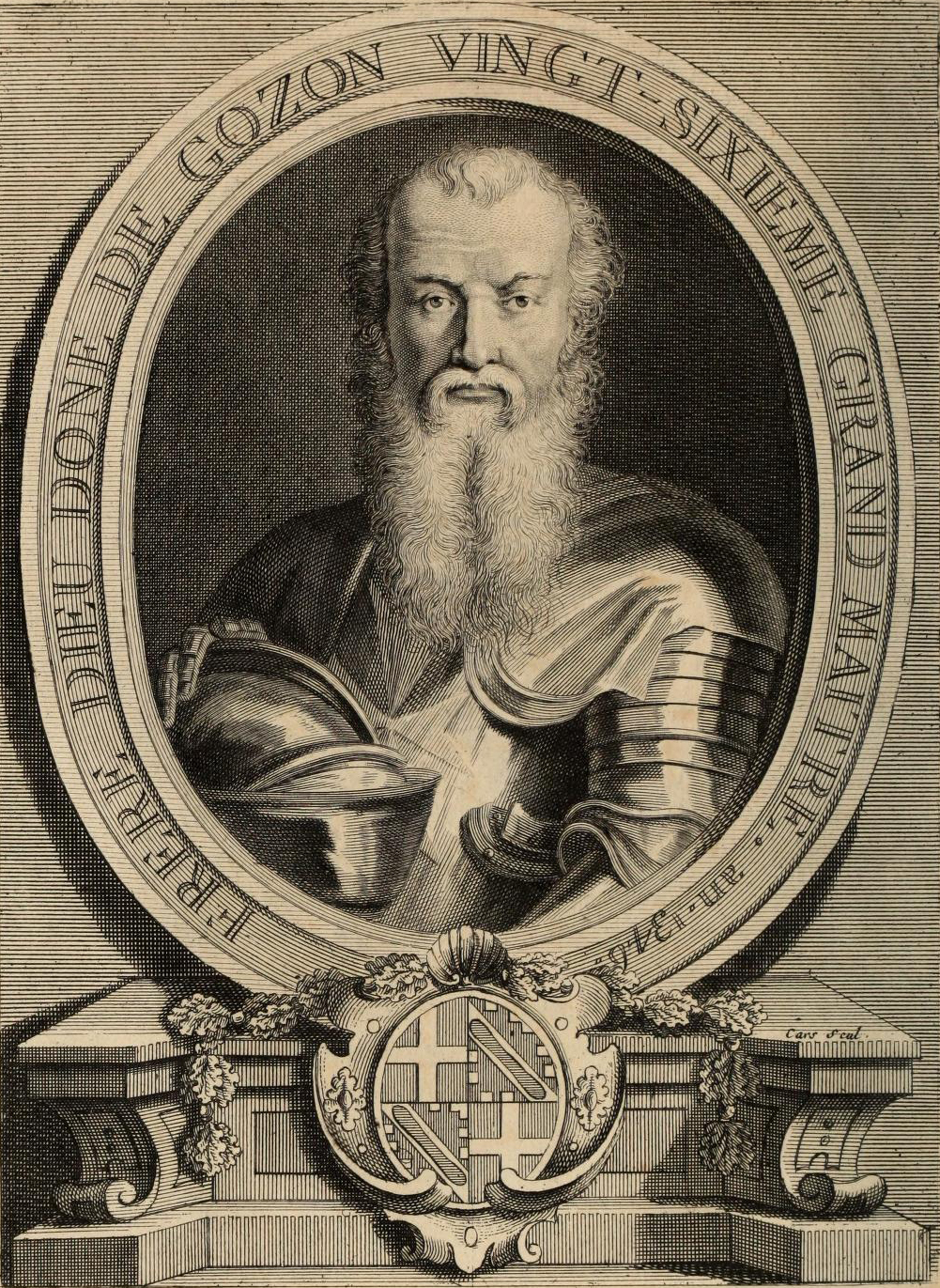
Early 18th century engraving of Dieudonné de Gozon by Jean-François Cars

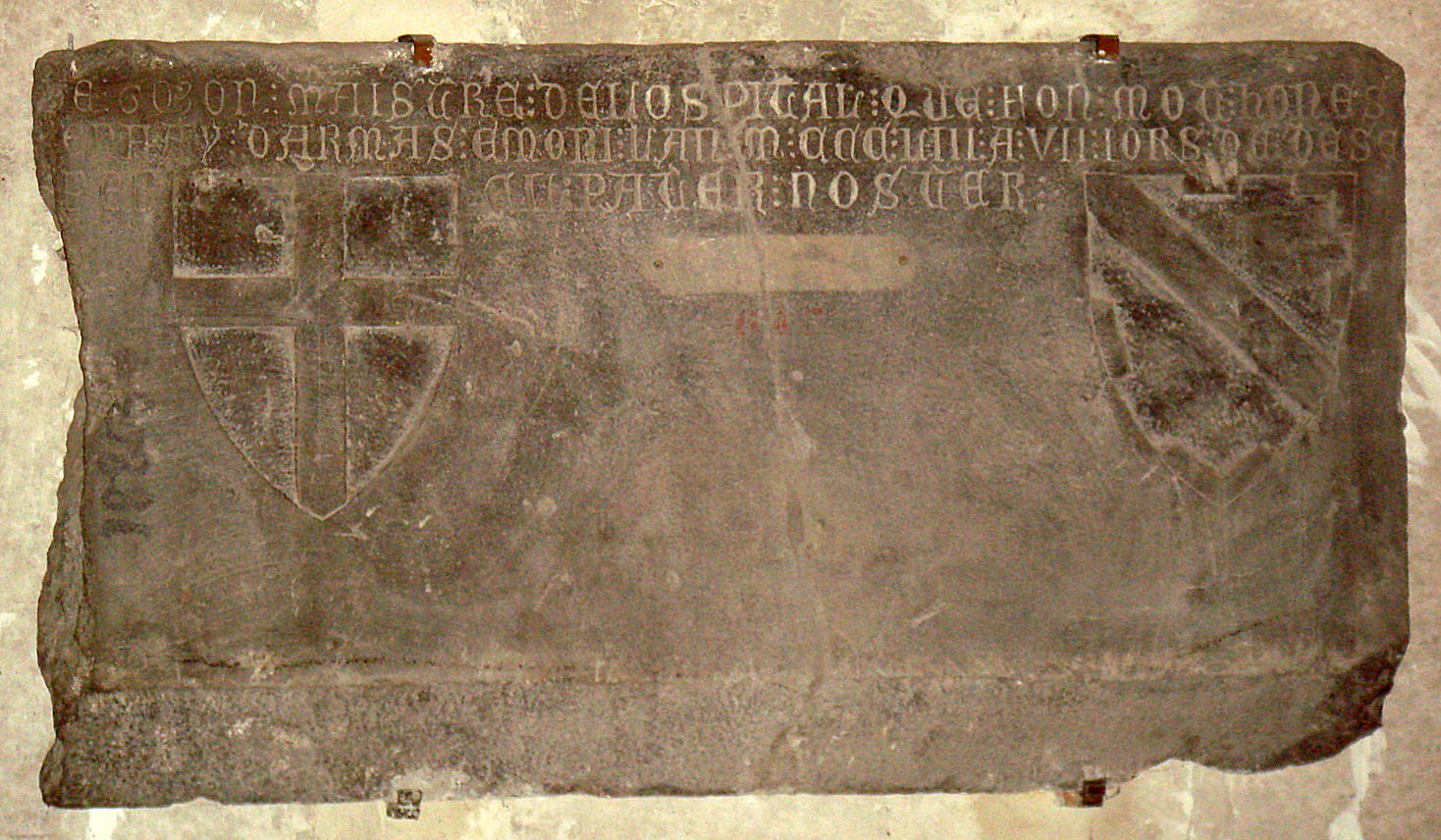
Tombstone of Dieudonné de Gozon, Rhodes. Musée de Cluny.

Dieudonné de Gozon was the Grand Master of the Knights of Rhodes from 1346 to 1353. He was born to a noble family in Languedoc, France. He carried the nickname Extinctor Draconis, which means "The Dragon Slayer" in Latin.

In 1347 and 1348, Gozon led his order in a march to aid King Constantine V of Armenia, who was threatened by the army of the Sultan of Egypt.

== The Dragon of Rhodes ==
A story tells of a dragon in the island of Rhodes, Greece, hiding in the local swamp and killing the cattle of the local farmers. Despite the orders of the previous Grand Master not to disturb the beast, Gozon slew the dragon and hung the head on one of the seven gates of the medieval town of Rhodes. The head was on display until around 1837, when it was disposed of by workers responsible for repairing the castle.

The Museum of the Order of St. John, in a 2015 article, states that there is no mention by any author of such a trophy on display before a 17th-century travelogue, which was written centuries after the head was supposedly hung on a gate at Rhodes. Historian Frederick William Hasluck suggests that Gozon's participation in a then-common Rogation festival, in which a facsimile of a dragon was "slain" to represent defeat of a symbolic "Spirit of Evil," may have evolved over time into a story where Gozon slew an actual, living dragon.

However The title Extinctor Draconis gained widespread, official European recognition when the Italian historian Giacomo Bosio published his monumental, official history of the Knights of St. John in 1594.

Bosio treated the legend as absolute historical fact. He went so far as to claim that the words Extinctor Draconis were visibly engraved on Gozon’s tombstone in Rhodes. Because Bosio's volumes became the definitive reference text for the Order's history across Europe, this 1594 publication permanently cemented the nickname.

Preceded by Helion de Villeneuve	Grand Master of the Knights Hospitaller; 1346–1353	Succeeded by Pierre de Corneillan
