= Guy de Blanchefort =

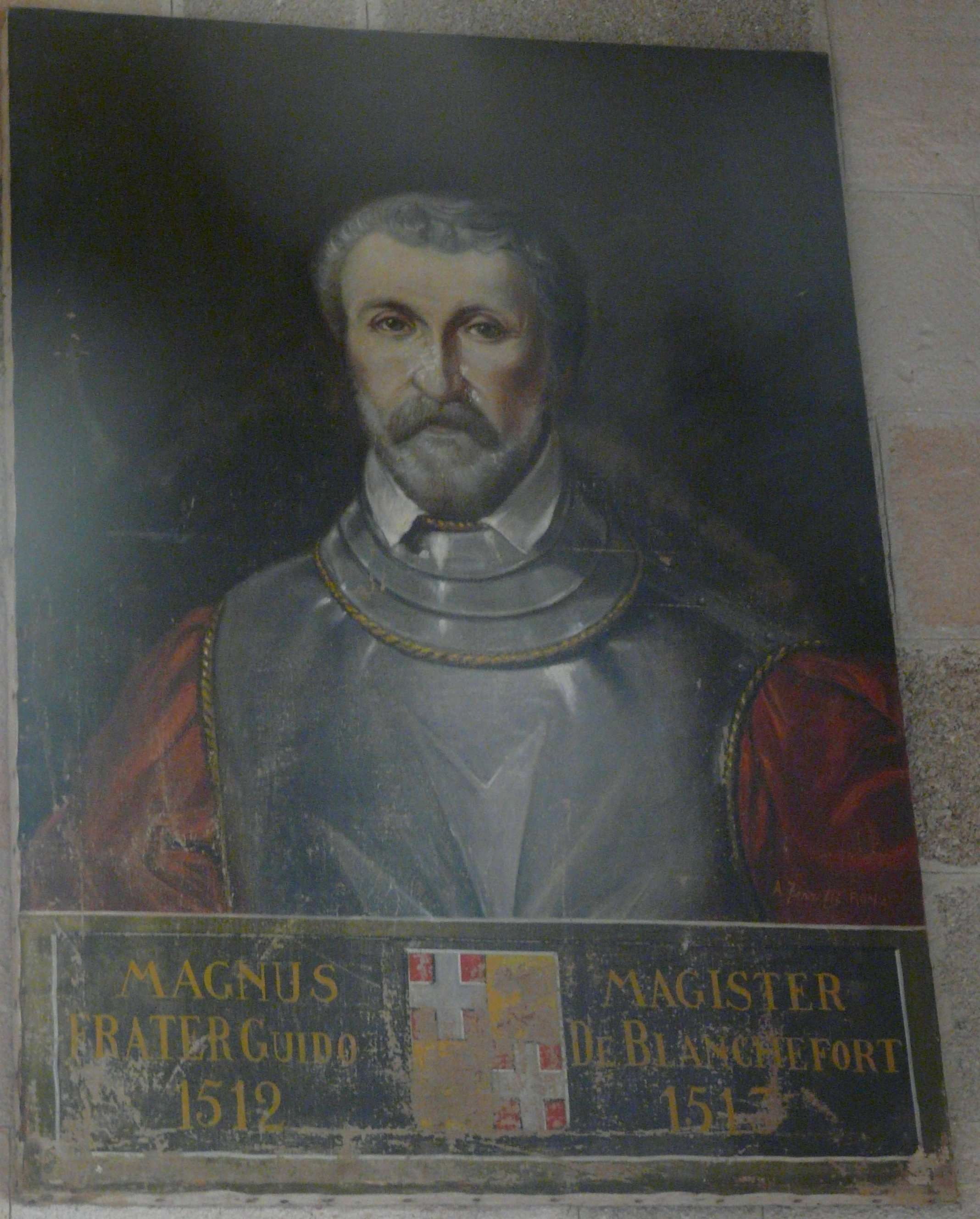

Grand Master of the Knights Hospitaller
- In office 1512–1513
- Preceded by: Emery d'Amboise
- Succeeded by: Fabrizio del Carretto

Personal details
- Born: 1446 Moutier-Malcard
- Died: 24 November 1513 (aged 66–67) Mediterranean Sea

Military service
- Allegiance: (Sovereign Military Order of Malta) Knights Hospitaller

Guy de Blanchefort (1446–1513) was the 42nd Grand Master of the Knights Hospitaller from 1512 to 1513.

When Grandmaster Emery d'Amboise died in 1512, Guy de Blanchefort was elected the new Grand Master. Guy was in Nice, and he sailed to Rhodes when he heard the news. He died during the journey and never made it to Rhodes. When news of his death reached Rhodes, Fabrizio del Carretto was elected the new Grand Master.

Preceded by Emery d'Amboise	Grand Master of the Knights Hospitaller; 1512–1513	Succeeded by Fabrizio del Carretto
