= Fortifications of Rhodes =

Historical fortifications of Greek city

Coordinates: 36.44385254463199°N 28.229161022192063°E

- Rhodes, Greece
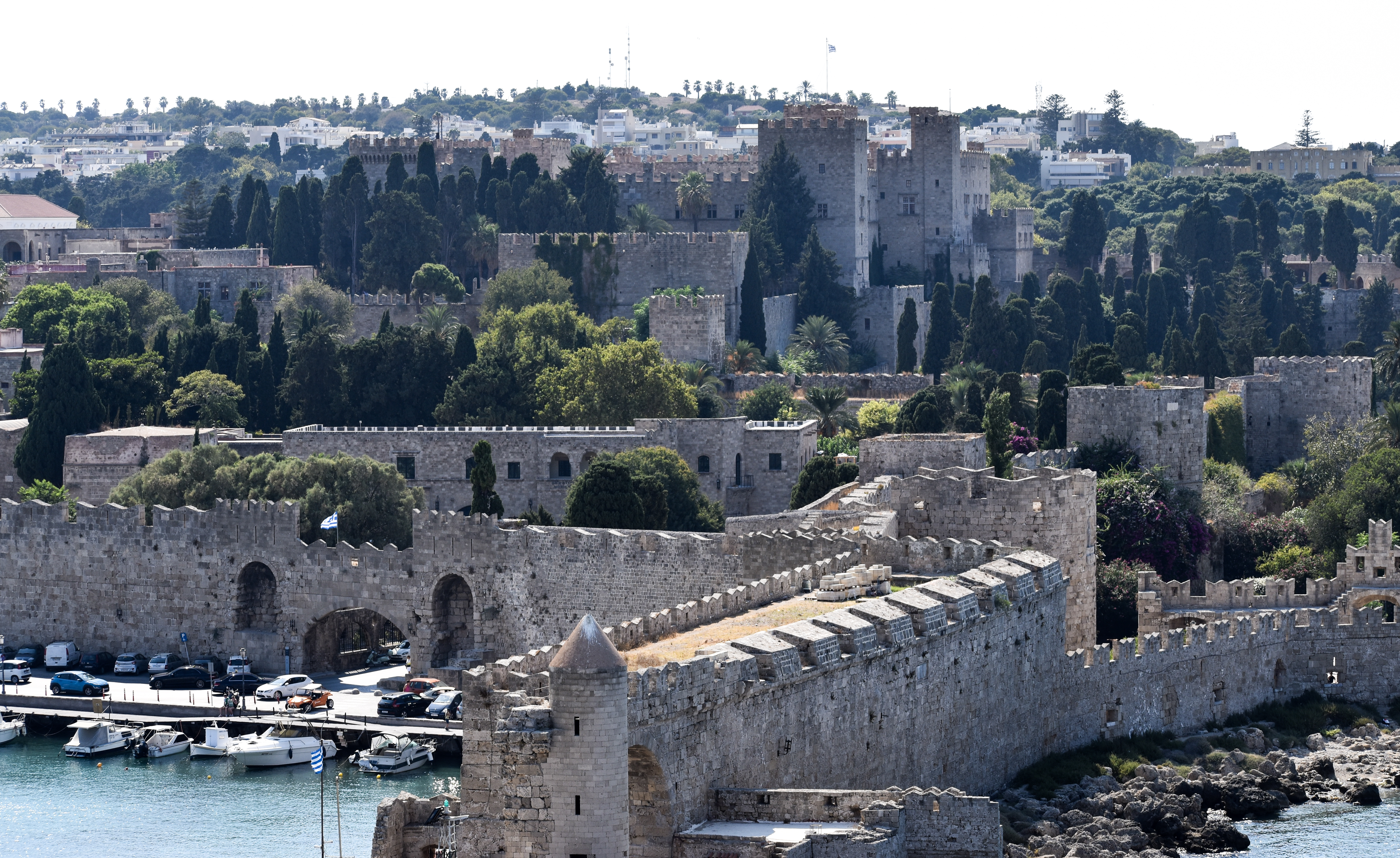
- View of the fortifications of Rhodes from the east

Site information
- Type: City wall
- Condition: Mostly intact

Location
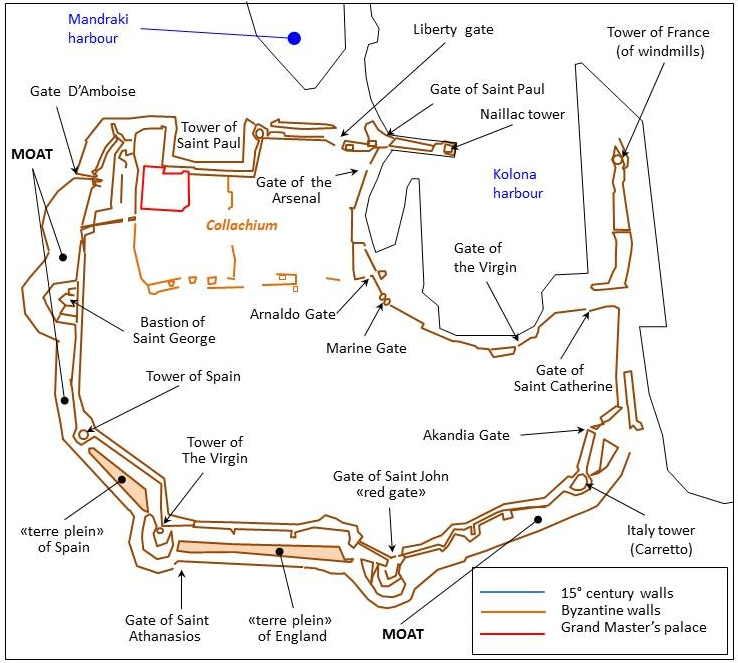
- Map of the fortifications of Rhodes

Site history
- Built: Antiquity–16th century
- Built by: Byzantine Empire; Knights Hospitaller
- In use: Antiquity–1522
- Battles/wars: Siege of Rhodes (1444); Siege of Rhodes (1480); Siege of Rhodes (1522)
- Events: 1481 Rhodes earthquake

UNESCO World Heritage Site
- Type: Cultural
- Criteria: ii, iv, v
- Designated: 1988 (12th session)
- Part of: Medieval old town of Rhodes
- Reference no.: 493
- Region: Europe and North America

The fortifications of the town of Rhodes are shaped like a defensive crescent around the medieval town and consist mostly of a fortification composed of a huge wall made of an embankment encased in stone, equipped with scarp, bastions, moat, counterscarp and glacis. The portion of fortifications facing the harbour is instead composed of a crenellated wall. On the moles, towers and defensive forts are found.

They were built by the Knights Hospitaller of Saint John by enhancing the existing Byzantine walls starting from 1309, the year in which they took possession of the island after a three-year struggle.

Like most of the defensive walls, they were built with a technique called rubble masonry which allows for a great mass capable of withstanding gunshots with smooth external stone faces to prevent climbing.

The defence of different portions of fortifications was assigned to different Langue (tongues) of Knights. The North face was under the rule of the Grand Master, then moving West and South the posts were held by the Langue of France and Alvernia, the Langue of Spain (Spanish and Portuguese), the Langue of Germany (English and German), and the Langue of Italy. Bastions and terrepleins still hold the name of the langue involved (e.g. Bastion of Italy, terreplein of Spain).

== History ==
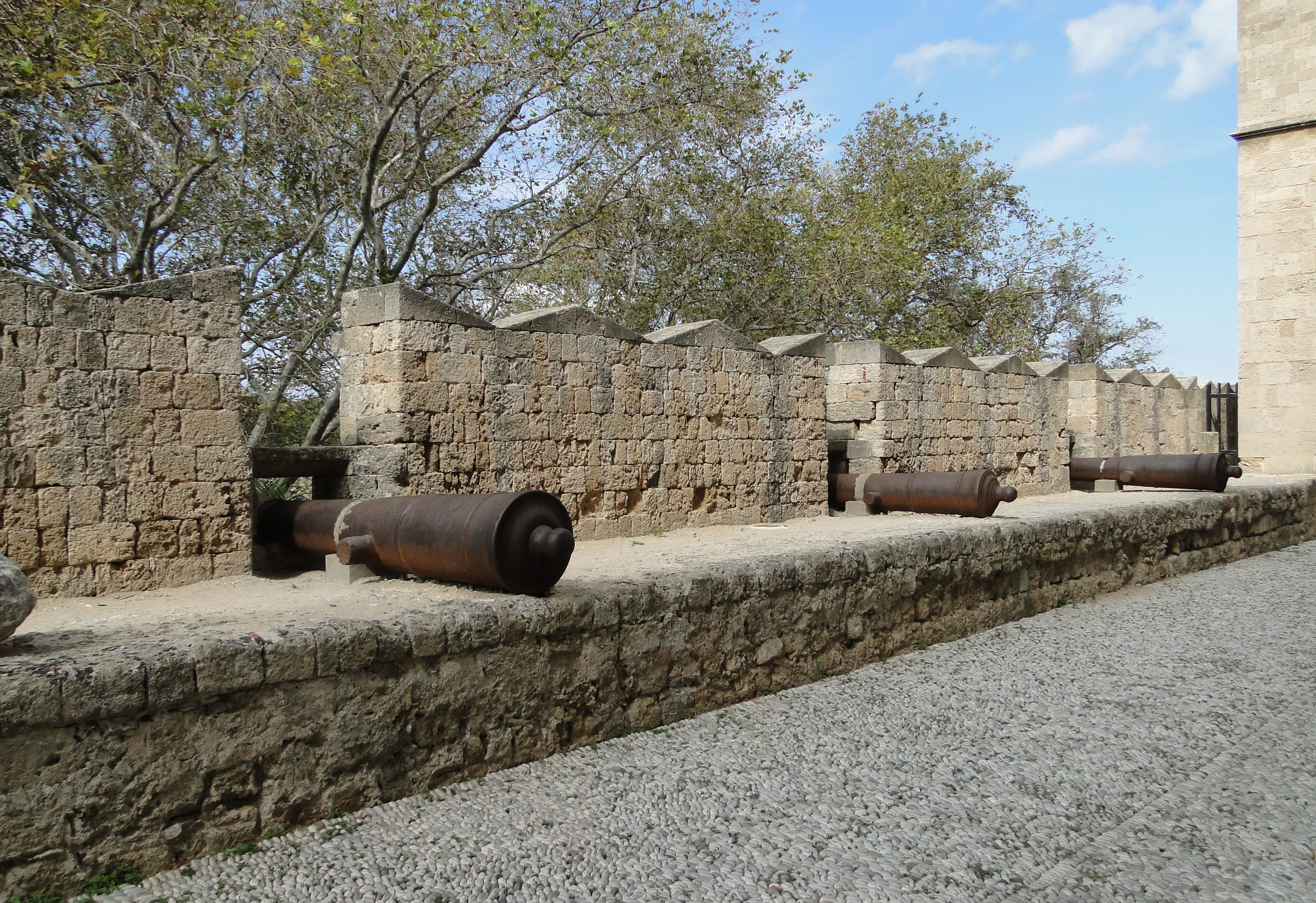
The cannons protecting the Palace of the Grand Master

Due to its geographical position as a gate to the Aegean Sea, Rhodes has always had a vantage position on the trade routes between the West and the East and has been an important stop thanks to its well protected harbours. During the Hellenistic period in the late 4th century BC, the town of Rhodes was already enclosed in defensive walls which allowed to withstand the siege of Demetrius Poliorketes king of Macedonia, in 305 BC. The famous Colossus of Rhodes was built to thank gods for the victory against Demetrius.
Philo of Byzantium author of the treatise "Paraskeuastica" on defensive works, stayed in Rhodes in the 3rd century BC and expressed his admiration for its walls. The earthquake of 226 BC severely damaged the fortifications, but they were soon rebuilt. The Byzantines built a fortress on the highest part of the town.

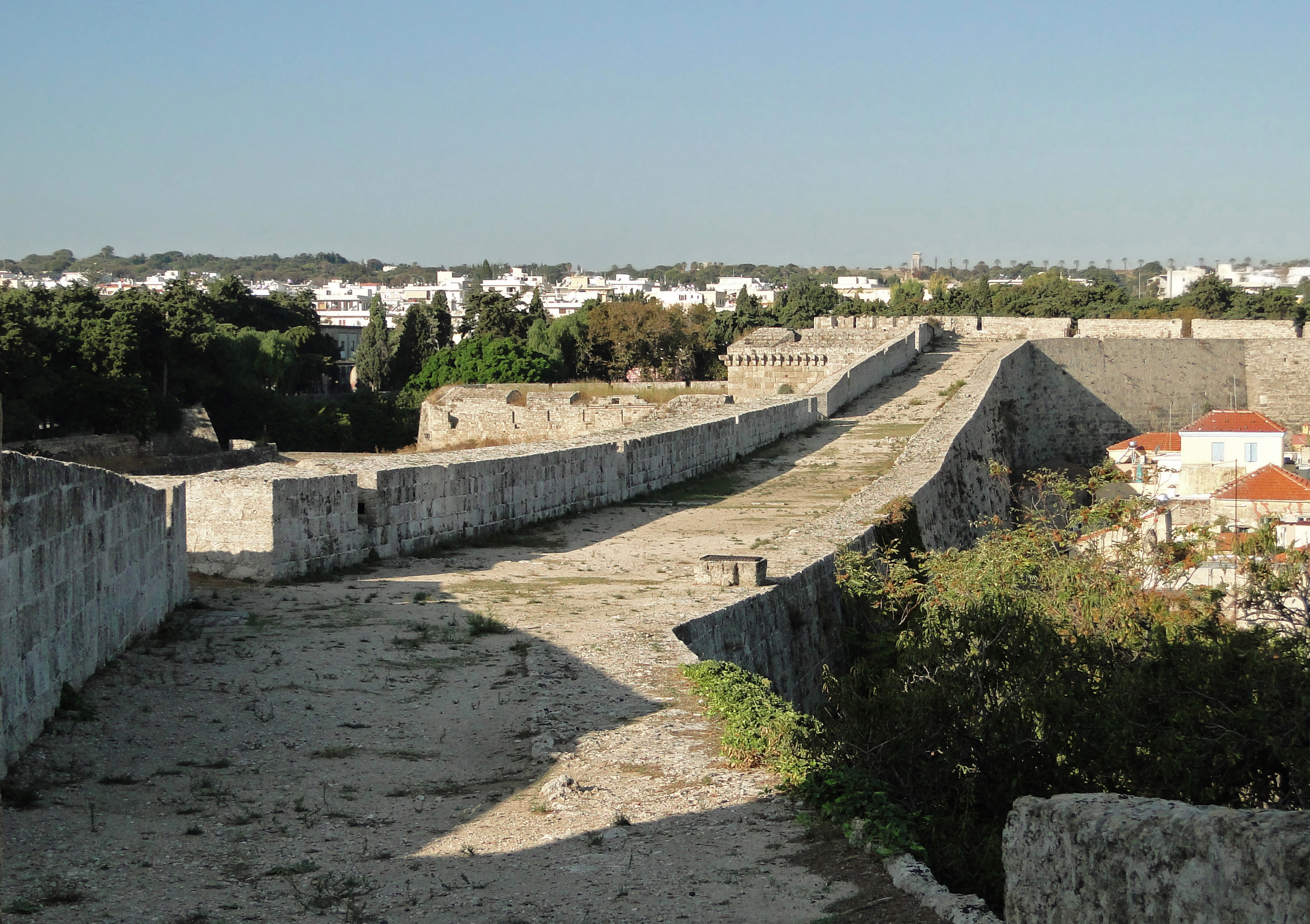
Chemin de ronde on the southern walls

When the Knights Hospitaller conquered the island, the town was still wealthy but in decline. Rhodes underwent an economical growth thanks to the richness that the knights brought in from the Holy Land and to the inheritance of the Templars' assets given to the Hospitallers after the Templar Order was suppressed in 1312 by decree of the king of France Philip IV. The richness of the island attracted the Ottomans from the nearby coast (Turkey is just 18 km away and can be easily seen from Rhodes). The knights started continuous works on the fortifications, both to include the new villages in the South of the historical Byzantine town and to update the fortification to the new military defensive techniques after the artillery started to be used currently as a siege means.

The Knights of Saint John had had a long experience in building fortresses and fortifications during the almost three centuries of their stay in the Holy Land, nevertheless the reference model for the construction of the fortification were the Theodosian walls of Constantinople which, during the centuries, had shown a great capacity to withstand sieges.

The expansion of the walls was undertaken by Grand Master Antonio Fluvian de Riviere who allowed the (medieval) town of Rhodes to reach the current area of about 42 hectares (104 acres). The wall curtain was finished between 1457 and 1465. The Byzantine fortifications were demolished leaving just a portion of those of the old fort known at the time of Knights as Collachium (Greek: Κολλάκιον).

In 1444 the Mameluke sultan of Egypt tried without success to conquer the town sieging it for 40 days.

In 1480 Rhodes was besieged by the troops of Mehmed II but the powerful army of the conqueror of Constantinople manned with 100,000 troops and 170 ships was repelled by the courage of the Knights and the strong fortifications, notwithstanding the outnumbering assailants. In 1481 a destructive earthquake struck the island causing severe damages to the houses and the fortification and about 30,000 casualties. A new Ottoman siege could not be withstood, so the Knights made available their great financial resources and in a very short time the most important palaces of the town and the fortifications were rebuilt. In the following years Grand Masters Pierre d'Aubusson, Emery d'Amboise, Fabrizio del Carretto and Philippe Villiers de l’Isle Adam ordered the fortifications to be rebuilt to withstand the cannons. For the purpose they called to Rhodes the best Italian military architects. Among them Matteo Gioeni, Basilio della Scuola, Gerolamo Bartolucci and Gabriele Tadino da Martinengo. The latter two were present in Rhodes during the final siege in 1522.

The Bastion of Italy (or Post of Italy) in which the Ottomans had opened a breach in 1480 was rebuilt with a powerful chemin de ronde for the reverse fire of cannons on the nearby spans of wall. This bastion was named "Bastion Del Carretto" after the Grand Master. The gate of Saint John was closed and a pentagonal bastion with the same name was built on the western side of the walls to guard Gate d'Amboise. After The Ottoman conquered Rhodes in 1522 they did not demolish the walls but repaired them and kept them under maintenance during the four centuries of their rule.

The fortifications of Rhodes were frozen at 1522 so that Rhodes is one of the few European walled towns that still shows the transition between the classical medieval fortification and the modern ones. The fortifications that still today make a belt around the medieval town, so that it is a separate neighbour from the new town, were restored during the Italian administration of the island and are, at present (2011), being studied, restored and maintained.

After their expulsion from Rhodes, the Hospitallers moved to the central Mediterranean island of Malta in 1530. They settled in the town of Birgu, and the first fortifications they built within the city were in a similar style to the fortifications of Rhodes.

== The gates of the old town of Rhodes ==
There are 11 gates to access the old city. Some of them are ancient, some are modern. The ancient gate of Saint George was closed by the Grand Master d'Aubusson after the siege of 1480 and transformed into a bastion. Starting from the Palace of the Grand Master that is from North-West towards the South they are:

=== Gate d’Amboise ===
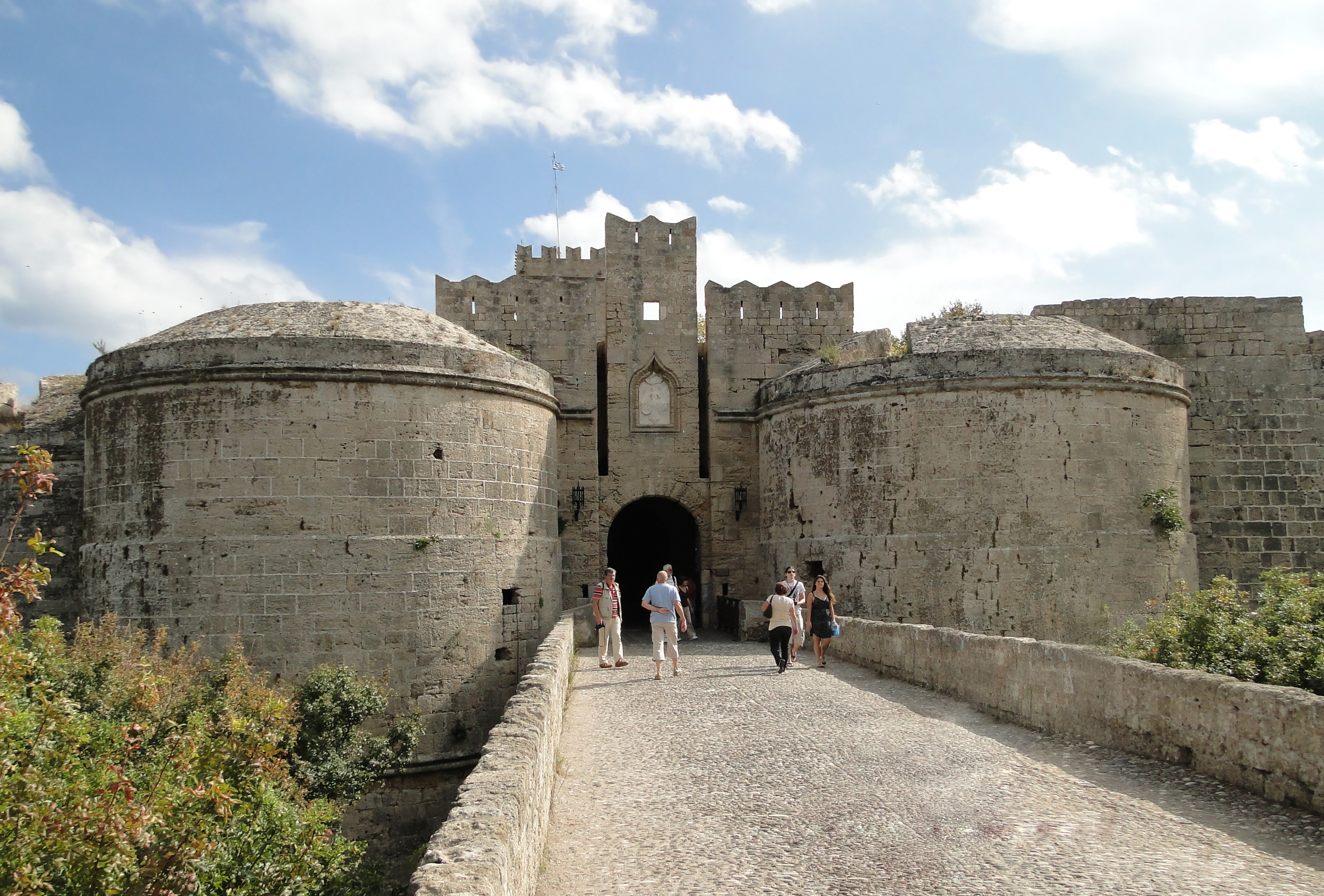
Gate d’Amboise

The d’Amboise Gate (Greek: Πύλη ντ’Αμπουάζ) is a grand gate just below the Palace of the Grand Master. It has a triple defensive belt with chemins de ronde, two round towers and covered entrance. Remains of the ancient studded wood doors are still visible. The Saint George bastion, pentagonal in shape, covered with its cannons the access through the gate.

=== Gate of Saint Athanasios ===
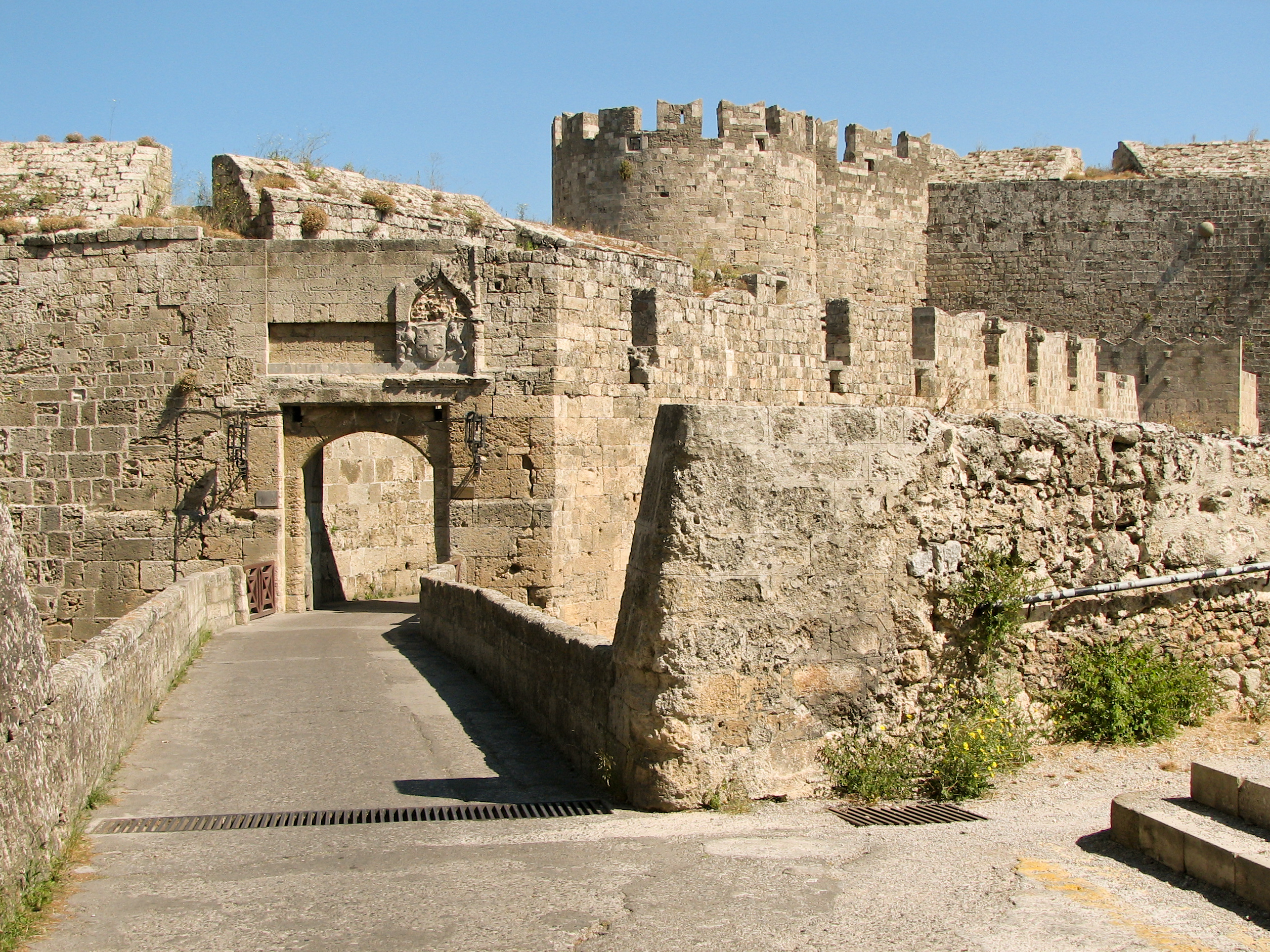
Gate of Saint Athanasiou

The Gate of St Athanasios (Πύλη Αγίου Αθανασίου) was built between 1441 and 1442. It is also known to locals as Saint Francis Gate since the church of Saint Francis of Assisi, built by the Italians, is just outside the gate. The round tower of Saint Mary that controlled the entrance to the gate was built in 1441 by the Grand Master Jean de Lastic

According to the Turkish tradition the troops of the conqueror Suleiman the Magnificent entered Rhodes through this gate. The gate was closed by the sultan who wished to avoid that any other conqueror could pass after him. Probably the door was closed by the Hospitallers for security reasons. It was re-opened by the Italians in 1922 during the 400th anniversary of the conquest of Rhodes by the Ottomans.

=== Gate of Saint John ===
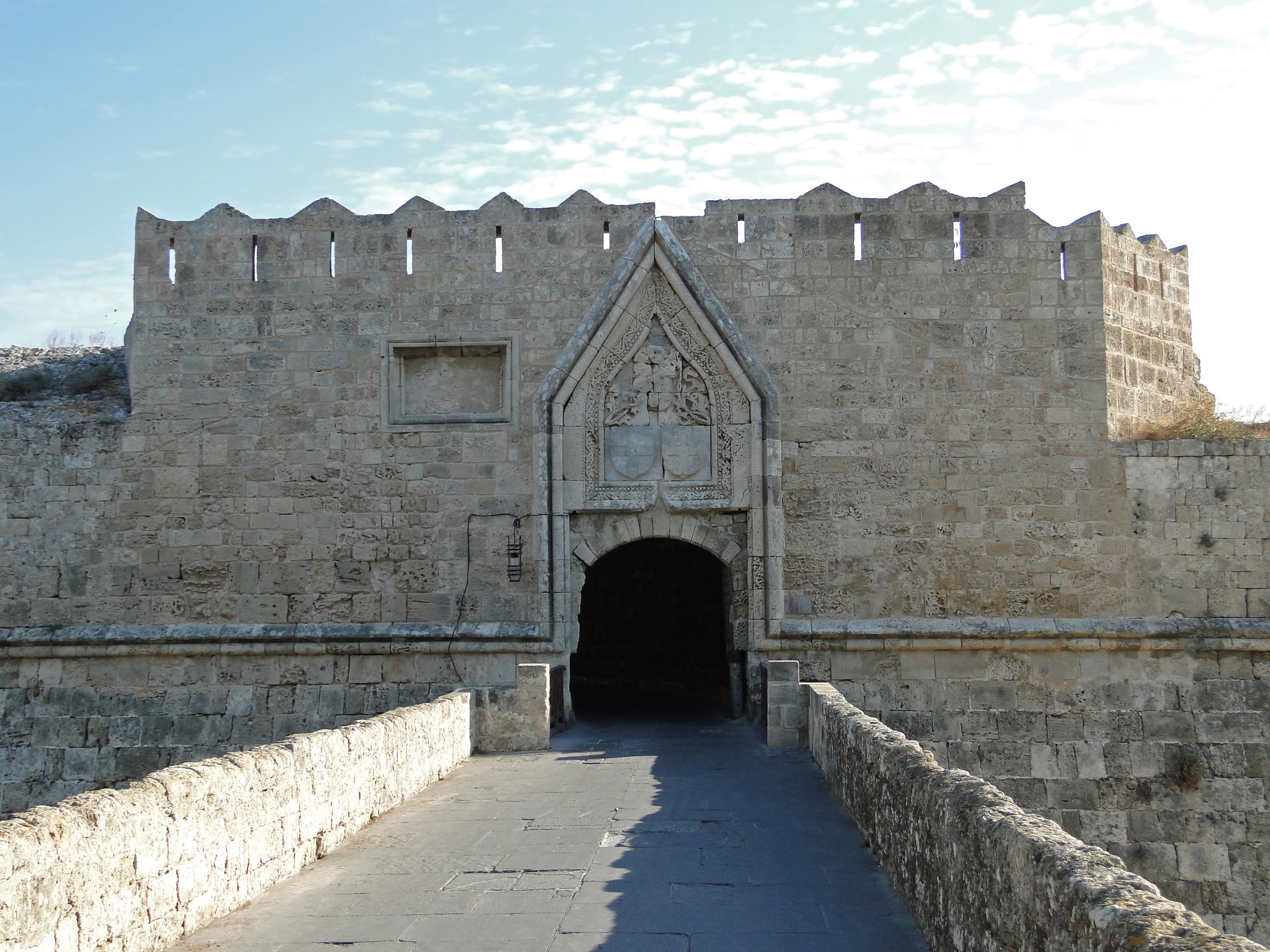
Gate of Saint John

The Gate of St John (Πύλη Αγίου Ιωάννου) is commonly known as Koshkinou or Porta Kokkini (Πόρτα Κόκκινη, "red door"). According to the tradition during the siege of 1522 there were so many fallen men in front of this gate that the stones were dyed red. The external fortification of the Gate of Saint John was built by the Grand Master d'Aubusson to protect the previous fortifications built by Grand Masters Fluvian, Jacques de Milly and Pedro Raimundo Zacosta.

In 1912 Italian troops entered the town through this gate. A frame which is currently empty, hosted a commemorative stone.

=== Acandia Gate ===
The Acandia Gate (Πύλη Ακαντιάς) was opened by the Italian administration in 1935 in the segment of fortifications to the North-East of the Del Carretto bastion to connect the commercial harbour with the South-East zone of the town beyond the medieval town. For the occasion a new street was outlined (via Del Carretto, nowadays Alhadeff Street) to connect Acandia Gate with the Gate of the Virgin.

=== Gate of Saint Catherine ===
The Gate of St Catherine (Πύλη της Αγίας Αικατερίνης) is also known as the Windmills Gate, since it allowed to reach the grain mills on the harbour mole from the commercial part of the town.

=== Gate of the Virgin ===
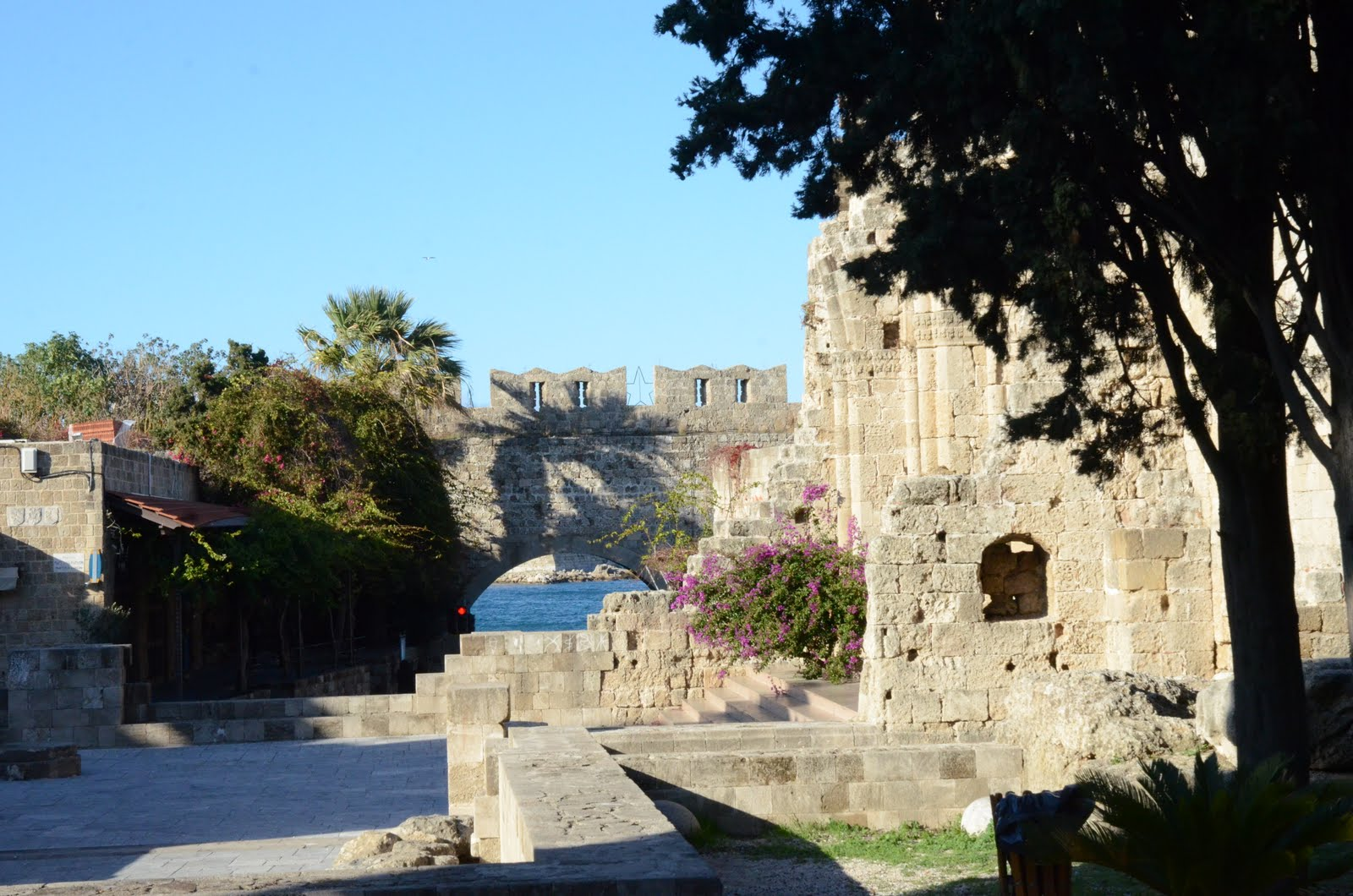
The Gate of the Virgin seen from the church of the Virgin of the Burgh

The Gate of the Virgin (Πύλη Παναγίας) is a modern gate, envisaged in the town master plan by the Italian administration to allow vehicle traffic, but opened only in 1955 by the Greek administration. Its name comes from the nearby church of the Virgin of the Burgh (or Virgin of Chora, meaning "main town"), The name "Burgh" comes from the bourgeois (as opposed to Knights) who inhabited this part of the town.

=== Marine Gate ===
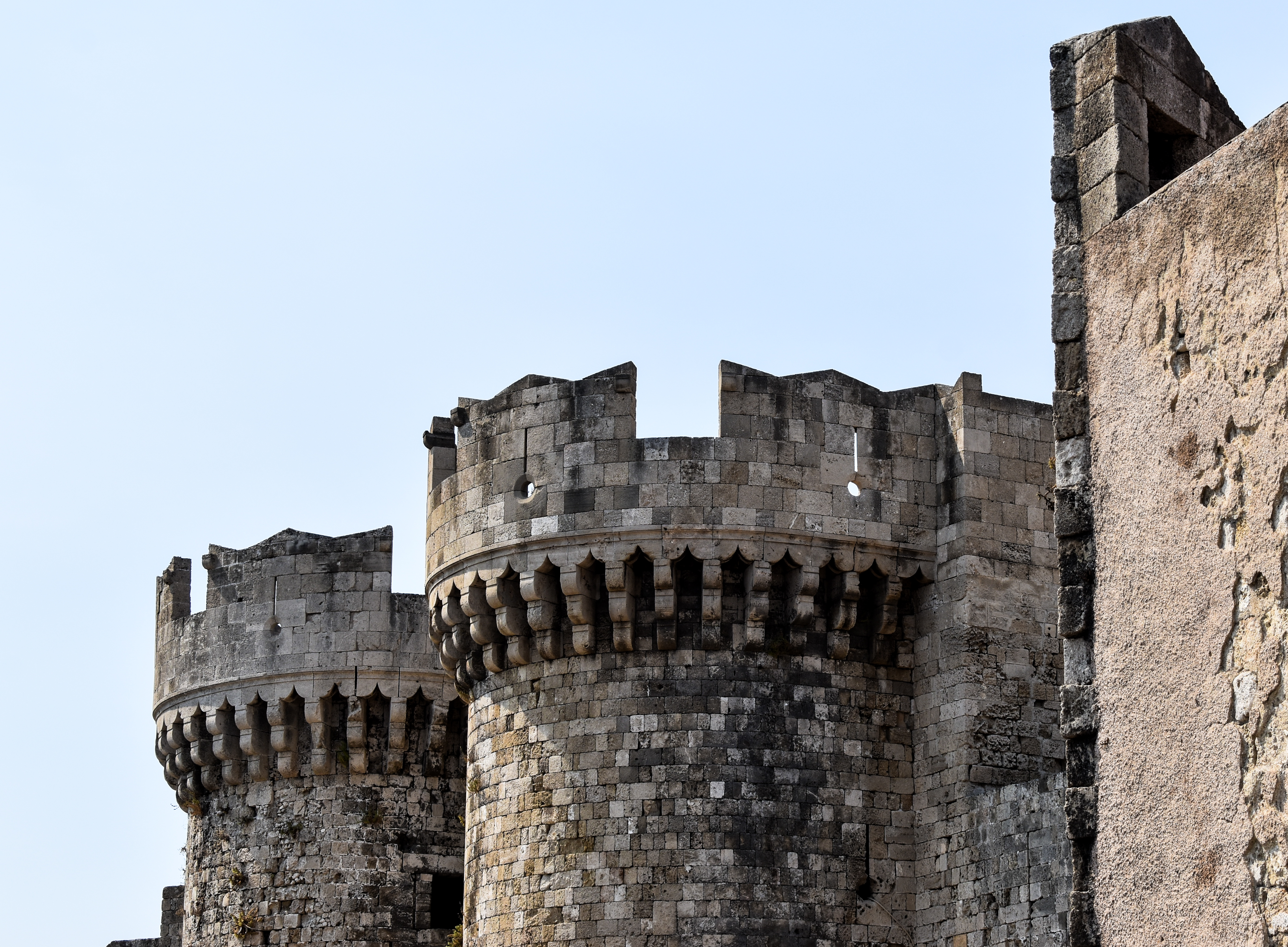
Battlements of the Marine Gate

The Marine or Sea Gate (Πύλη Θαλασσινή) was the main entrance to the town from the harbour. Its defensive towers have a representative task more than defence in facts due to the reduced space between the waterfront and the walls no army could have ever attempted an attack from this side of the fortifications. During World War II the Allied bombings destroyed the upper part of the North tower. In 1951 the gate was restored by the Greek administration together with the Gate of Saint Paul.

=== Arnaldo Gate ===
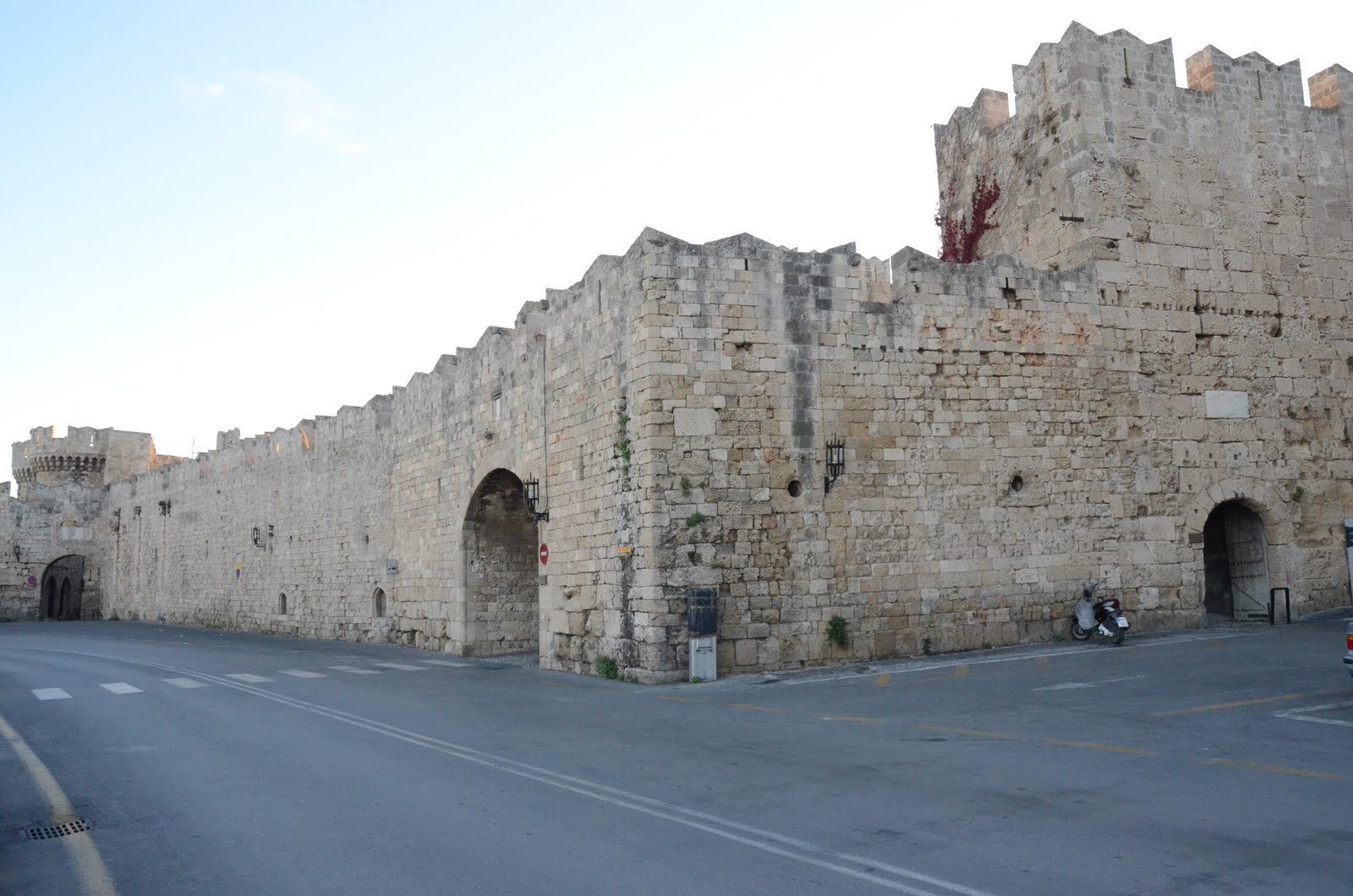
Arnaldo Gate

The Arnaldo Gate (Πύλη Αρνάλδου) is a small gate that gives access to the New Hospital of Saint John, which hosts currently the Archaeological Museum of Rhodes.

=== Gate of the Arsenal ===
The Gate (in Greek: Πύλη Ταρσανά) was built during the 14th century by the Grand Master Juan Fernandez de Heredia whose coat of arms stands on top of the gate. In 1908 the Ottoman administration demolished the side towers to widen the access road to the Kolona harbour. Today thanks to the direct connection with the Liberty gate it allows a fast flow of vehicles between the Kolona harbour and the new town.

=== Gate of Saint Paul ===
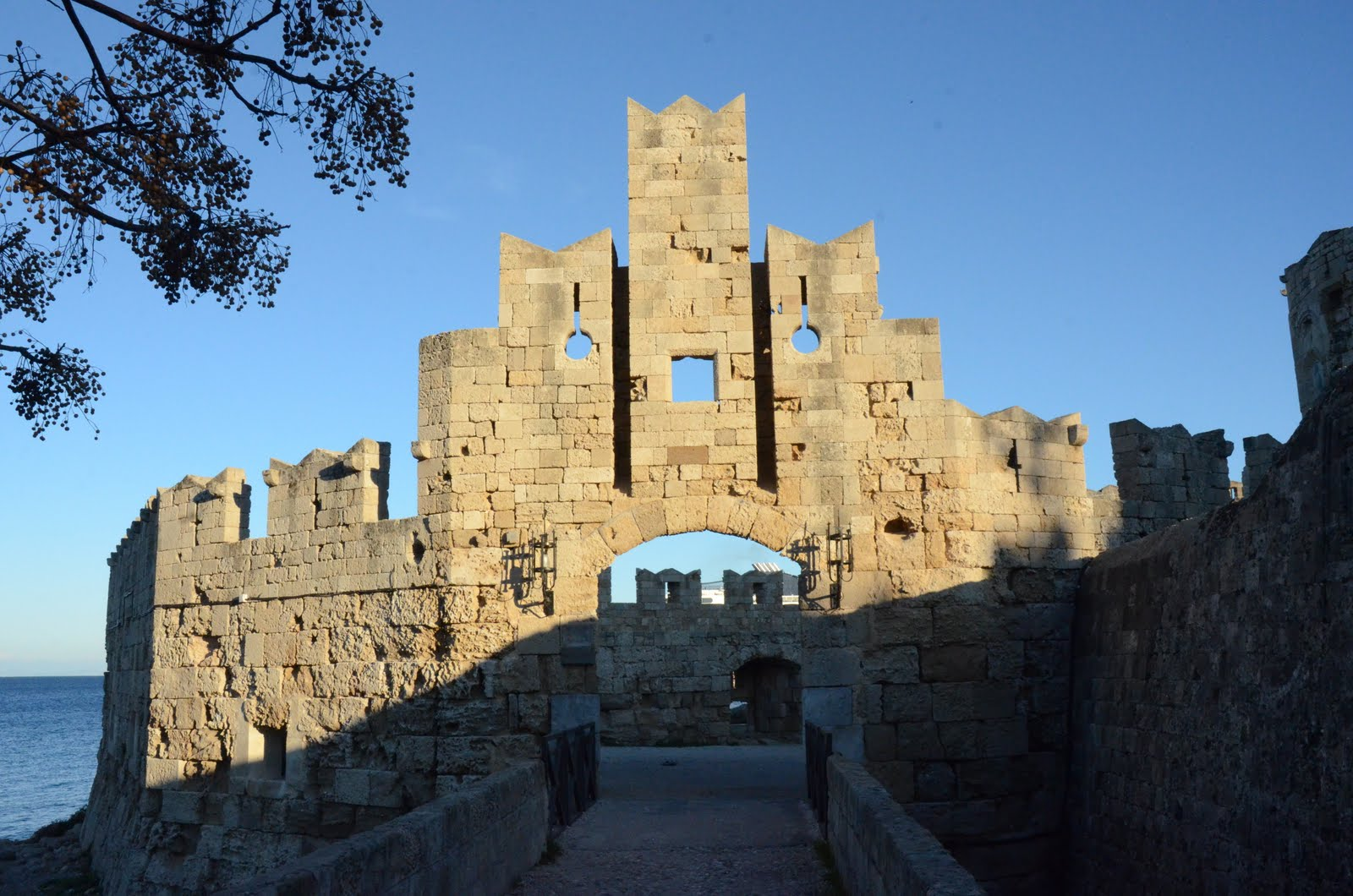
Gate of Saint Paul

The Gate (in Greek: Πύλη Αγίου Παύλου) was built in the second half of the 15th century to allow the access to the fortified city and the Kolona harbour. The Gate of Saint Paul was almost completely demolished during World War II and was rebuilt together with Marine Gate in 1951.

=== Liberty Gate ===
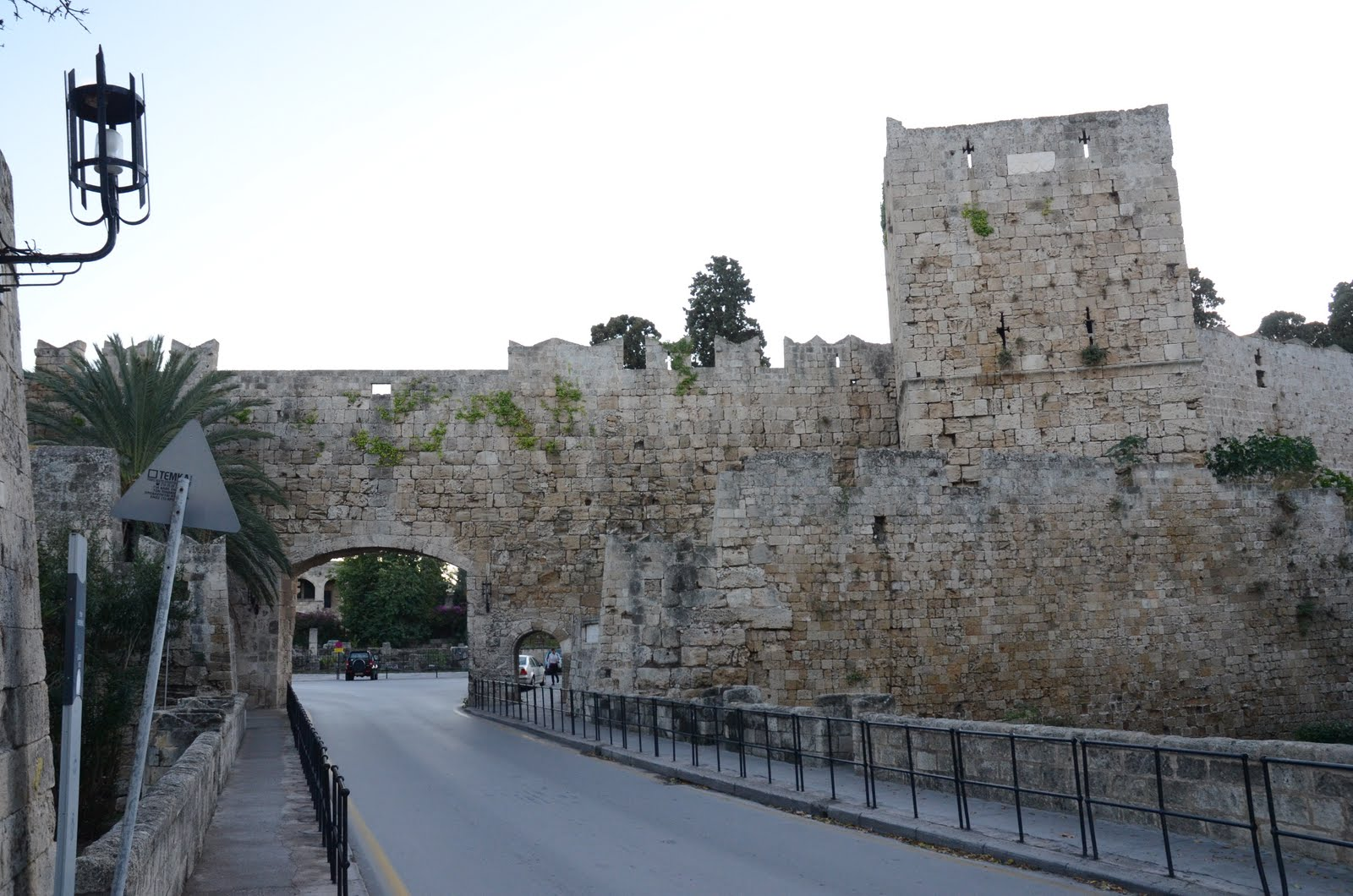
Liberty Gate

The Liberty Gate (Πύλη Ελευθερίας) was opened by the Italians in 1924, who portrayed themselves as liberators from Ottoman rule. It is the main access to the Kolona harbour and allows the connection between the Kolona and Mandraki harbours. Although it is a modern gate it was built respecting the architectural style of the medieval gates. The road that crosses it continues through the Arsenal gate.

== Bastions and towers ==
=== Bastion of Saint George ===
It has a pentagonal shape and represents one of the examples of a gate transformed into a bastion through subsequent modifications that took place until the final siege of 1522. With the addition of the powerful terreplein of Spain the Bastion of Saint Georges is the model of the successive modern forts. It final transformation was designed by the Italian architect Basilio della Scuola and carries coat of arms of the latest Grand master in Rhodes Philippe Villiers de l’Isle Adam.

=== Bastion of Italy ===
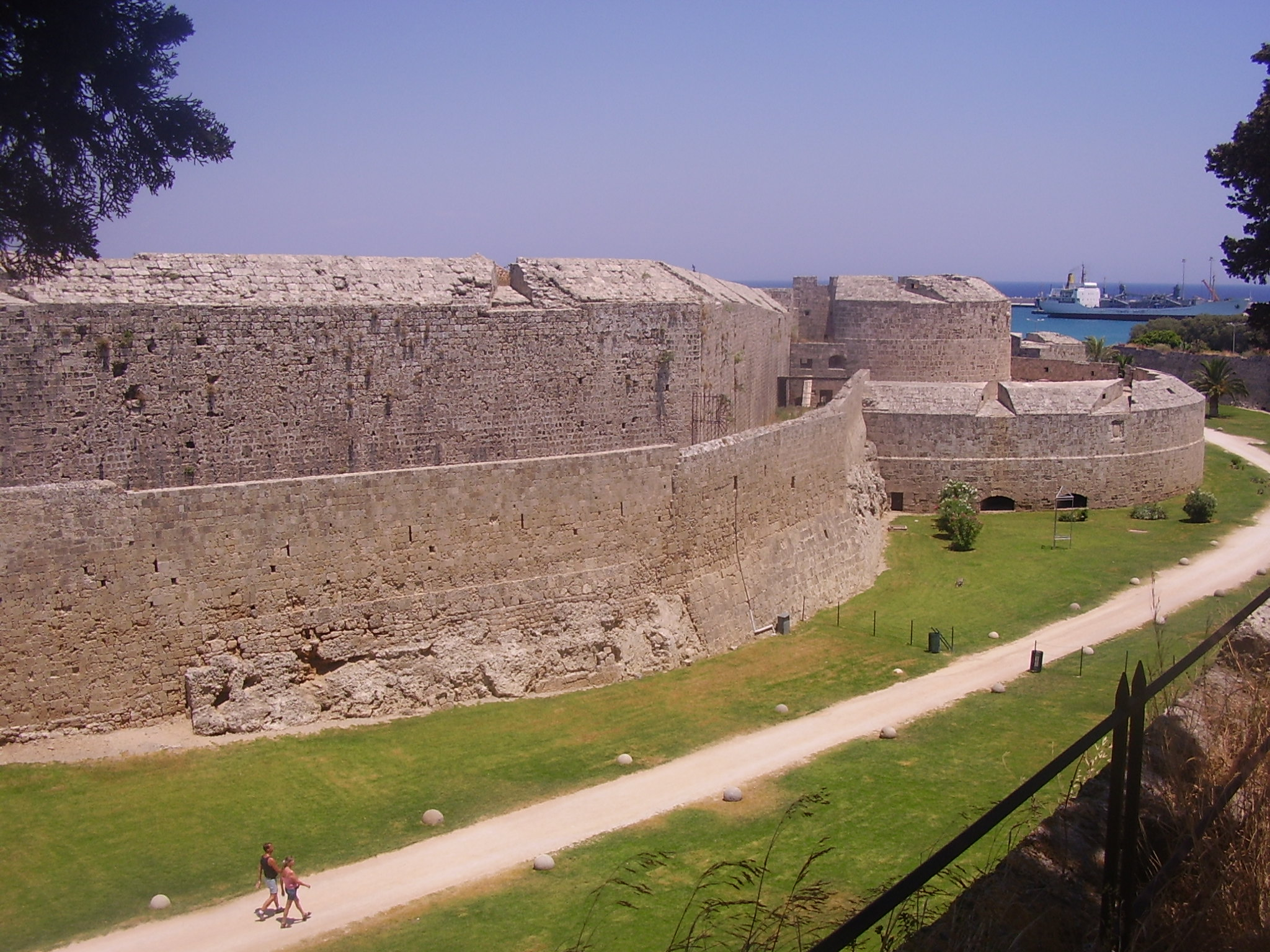
Del Carretto Bastion and the angled wall

Post of Italy or Del Carretto Bastion. This is the place where the troops of Mehmed II breached the walls and were then repelled by the knights during the siege of 1481. Grand Master Fabrizio del Carretto had it armoured with a chemin de ronde to hold cannon emplacements.

=== Naillac Tower ===
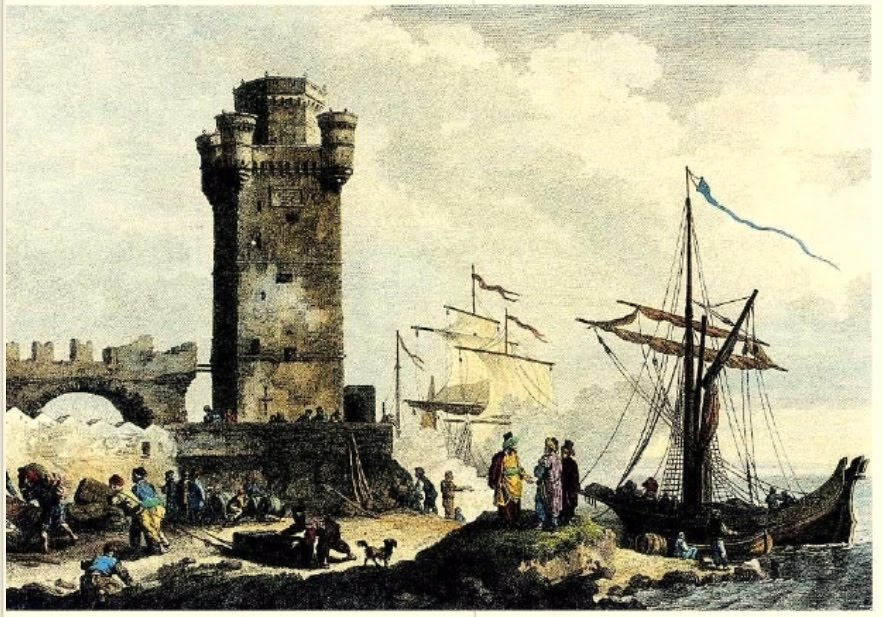
Naillac tower (from a drawing of late 1700)

It was built between 1396 and 1421 by the Grand Master Philibert de Naillac before the development of the cannons on the mole east of the Gate of Saint Paul that closes the commercial harbour. It had a square shape like many other medieval towers and was 46 m (145 ft.) high. It was the terminal of the wall belt facing the harbour and was used as a watch tower. It was severely damaged during earthquakes of the 19th century and was demolished by the Ottoman administration.

=== Windmills Tower ===
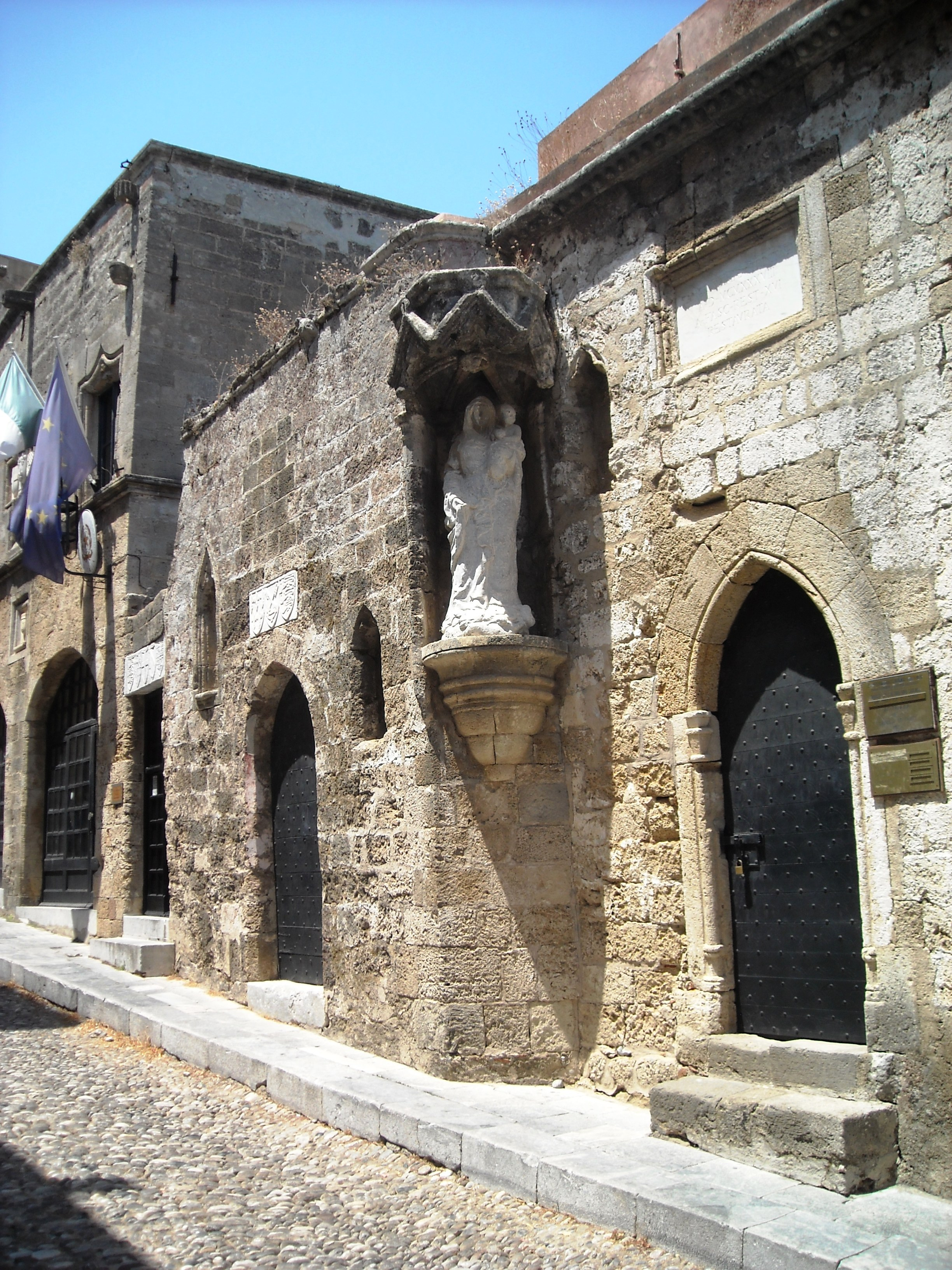
Albergo di Francia, French Knights' quarters

It is known as Tower of France or Tower of the Angel. It was one of the two towers protecting the Commercial harbour ("emporium" in Greek Εμπόριον). It was built on the natural mole East of the harbour by the Grand Master d'Aubusson who had the coat of arms of France placed on the tower (hence one of its names). On the mole there were originally 13 windmills. Today only one is left.

=== Tower and Fort of Saint Nicholas ===
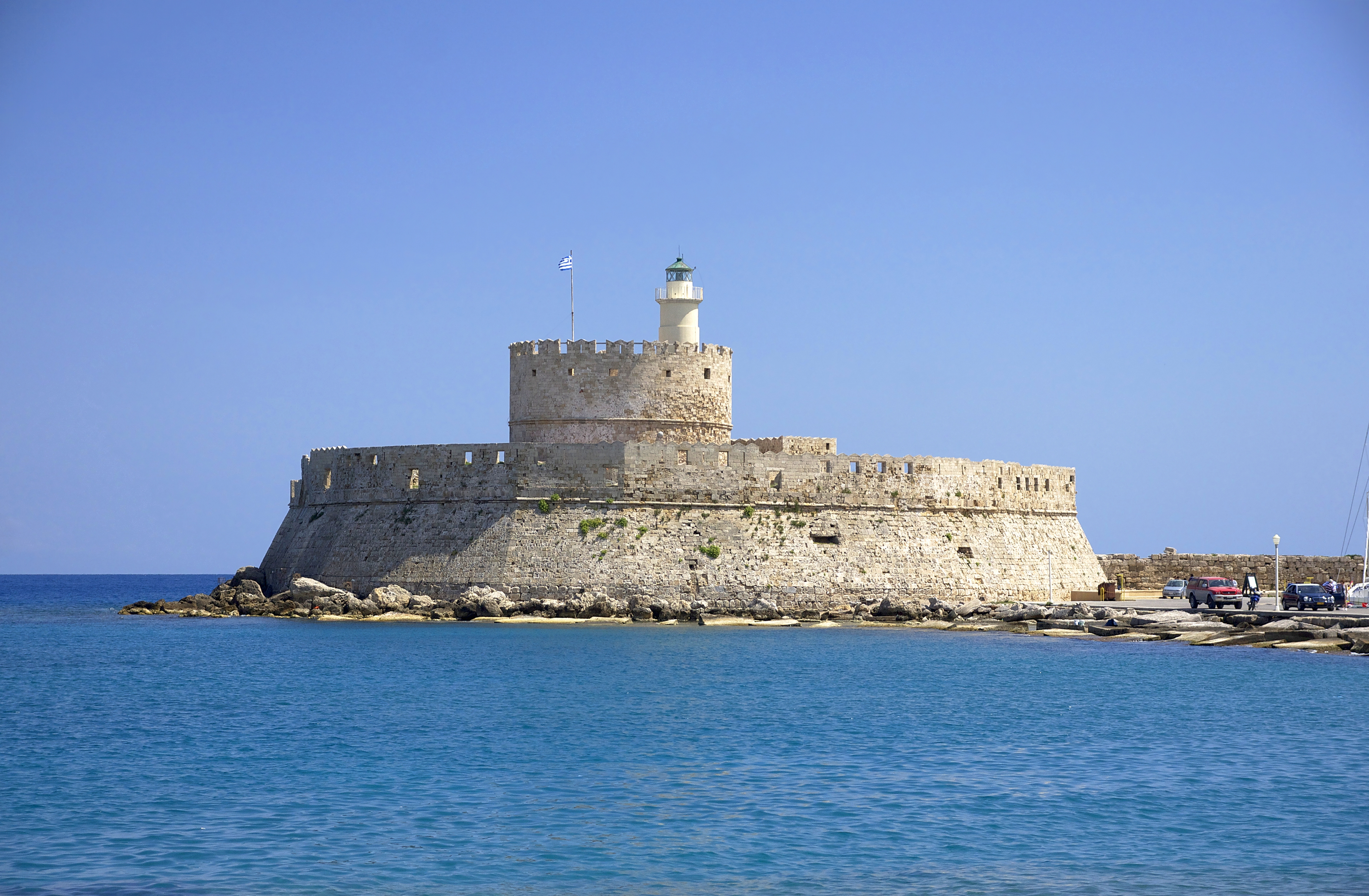
The Fort of Saint Nicholas that guards the Mandraki harbour

The Mandraki (in Greek Μανδράκι) was the military harbour and was guarded by a tower built between 1464 and 1467 by the Grand Master Zacosta at the end of the natural mole. After the siege of Rhodes in 1480 the Grand Master d'Aubusson added a bastion around the tower transforming it into a guard fortress on the sea.

=== Terreplein of Spain ===
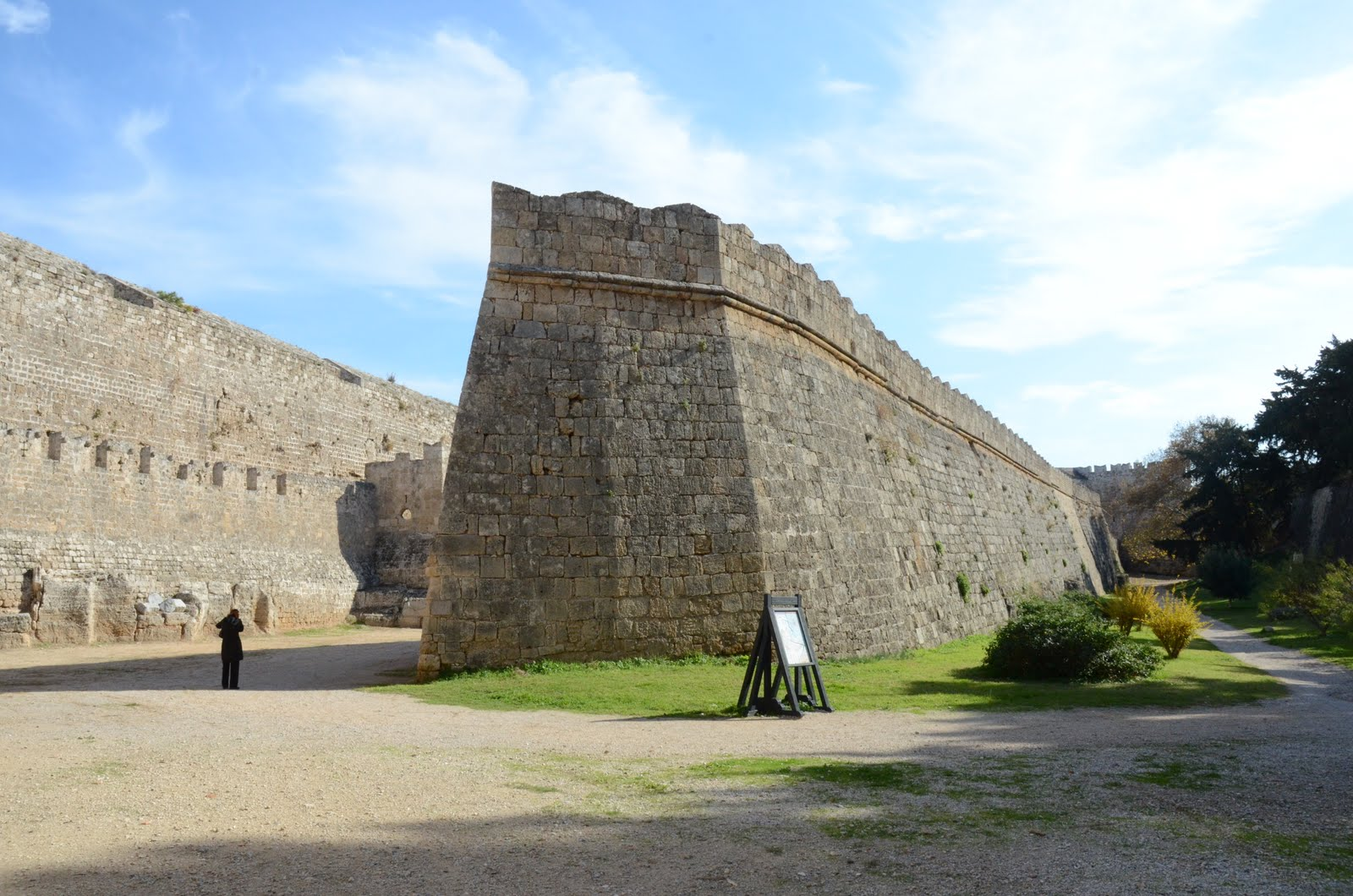
Terreplein of Spain

This terreplein (embankment) was built in the middle of the moat together the other two after the siege of 1480. It prevented cannon from having a clear shot at the walls and if assailants had entered the moat, the moat could have been reached through underground passages that could have quickly been blown up in case of withdrawal. In 1522 the Ottoman tried to undermine the terrepleins by tunnelling under the moat.

The terreplein of Spain is placed in the South West portion of the walls on the side of the Gate of Saint Athanasiou and was guarded by the knights of the langue of Spain.

=== Terreplein of England ===
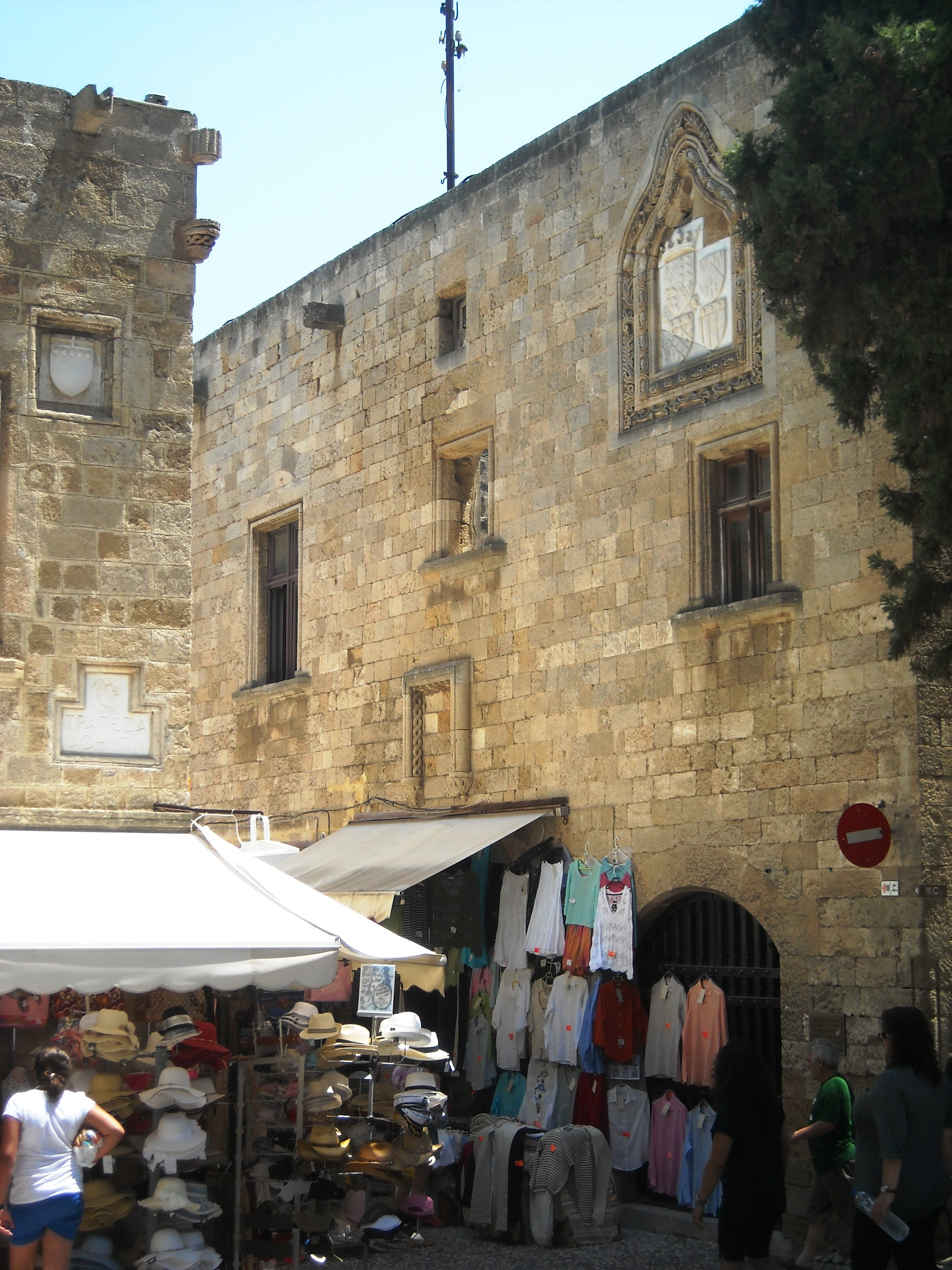
Albergo d'Inghilterra, English Knights' quarters

Placed in the South side of the walls between the Gate of Saint Athanasiou and the Gate of Sain John was guarded by the knights of the langue of England

=== Terreplein of Italy ===
The terreplein of Italy was placed in the south East portion of the wall just north of the Bastion of Italy and guarded by the knights of the langue of Italy. It was partially demolished and split into three portions by the Italian administration to open the Acandia Gate.

== The medieval town of Rhodes ==
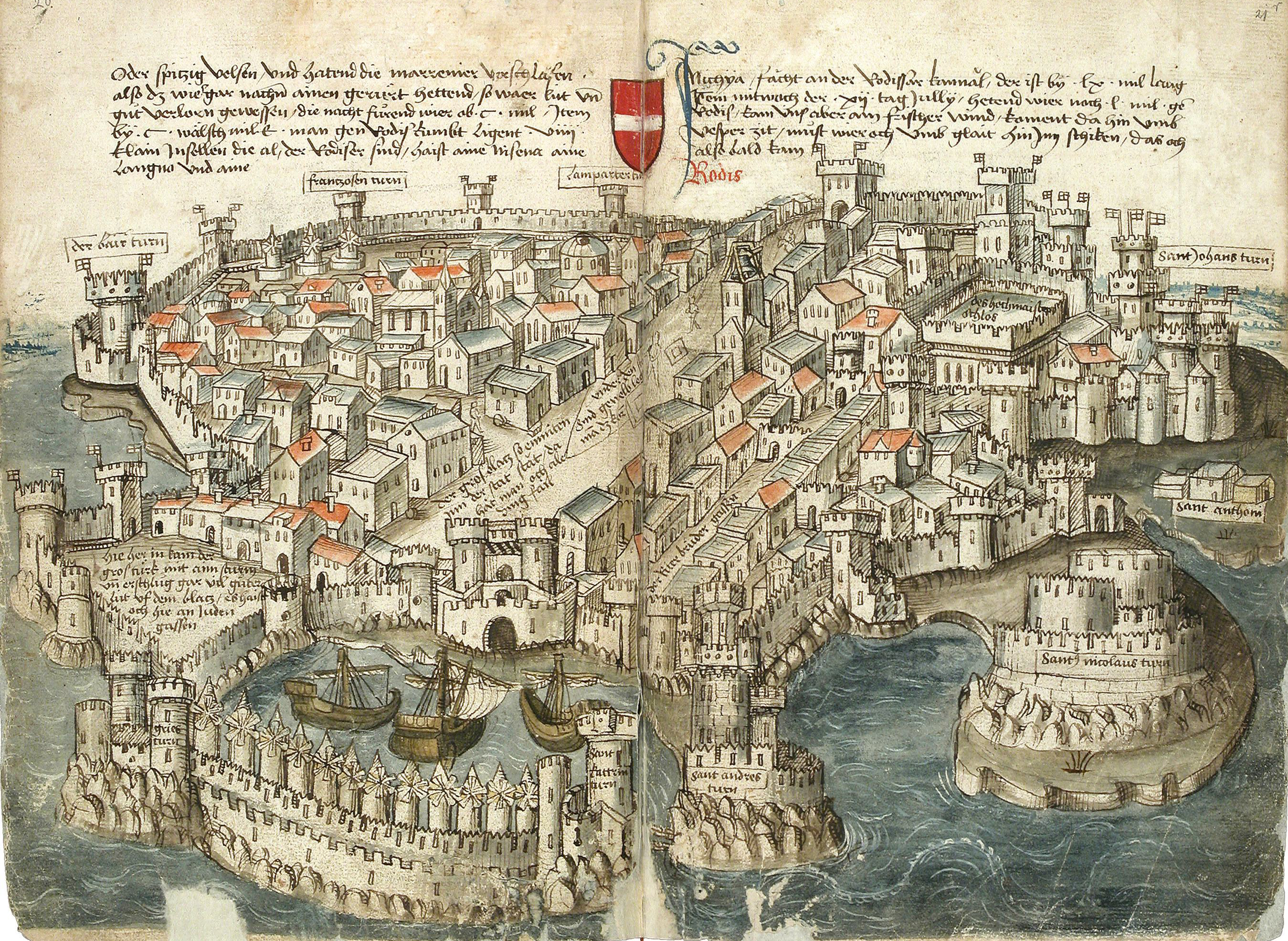
Rhodes city, around 1490

Contained within the Fortifications of Rhodes is the largest active medieval town in Europe, with over 6,000 inhabitants. The medieval town, as well as being part of the UNESCO world heritage site, is also a major tourism attraction. The medieval town (Παλαιά Πόλη) contains a number of sites, including the clock-tower, Socrates Square, the Jewish Square, the old Haman, Suleiman Mosque Socrates Street, the Street of the Knights, and the Palace of the Grand Master of the Knights of Rhodes.

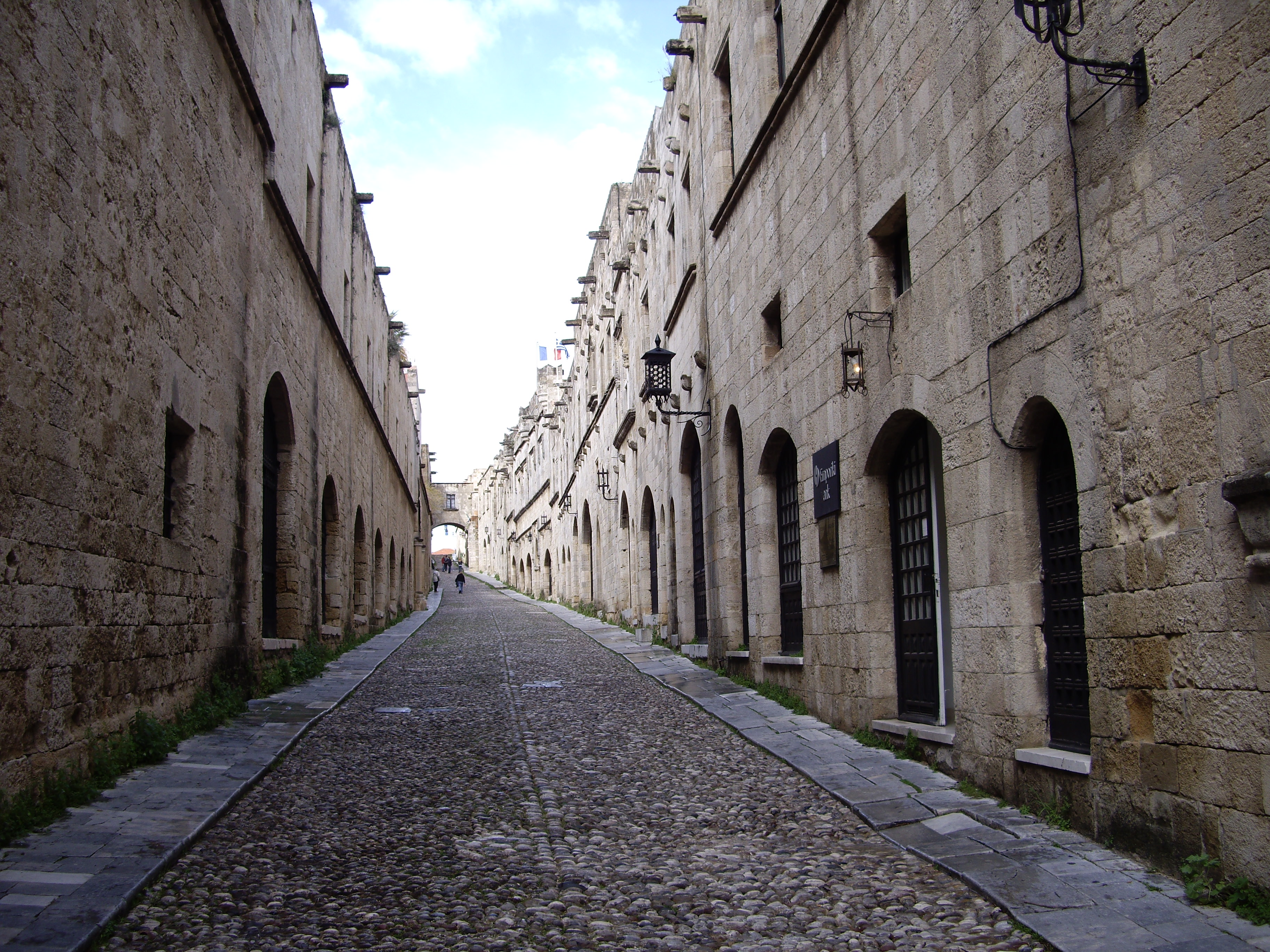
The Avenue of the Knights

The medieval town contains a number of different architectural styles, due to its history. The town mostly developed under the Knights of St John, which accounts for its predominantly Gothic architecture. However, after the second siege of Rhodes the medieval town was also developed in the Ottoman era. New buildings were constructed including: mosques, public baths and mansions for the new patrons. The architectural significance of Rhodes, is summarised by UNESCO when it states: "with its Frankish and Ottoman buildings the old town of Rhodes is an important ensemble of traditional human settlement, characterized by successive and complex phenomena of acculturation. Contact with the traditions of the Dodecanese changed the forms of Gothic architecture, and building after 1523 combined vernacular forms resulting from the meeting of two worlds with decorative elements of Ottoman origin. All the built-up elements dating before 1912 have become vulnerable because of the evolution in living conditions and they must be protected as much as the great religious, civil and military monuments, the churches, monasteries, mosques, baths, palaces, forts, gates and ramparts."

The medieval town of Rhodes, has been the set of a number of movies, including The Guns of Navarone.

== See also ==
- Fortifications of Malta

== Bibliography ==
- David Nicolle "Knights of Jerusalem: the crusading order of Hospitallers 1100-1565" – Osprey Publishing, 2008
- Gino Manicone "Rodi sposa del sole", Casamari, La Monastica, 1992.
- Ministry of Culture – Works supervision committee for the monuments of the medieval town of Rhodes "Medieval Town of Rhodes - Restoration Works (1985–2000) - Part One" Rhodes, 2001
- Ministry of Culture – Works supervision committee for the monuments of the medieval town of Rhodes "Medieval Town of Rhodes - Restoration Works (1985–2000) - Part Two" Rhodes, 2001
