= Jean de Lastic =

Grand Master of the Knight Hospitaller

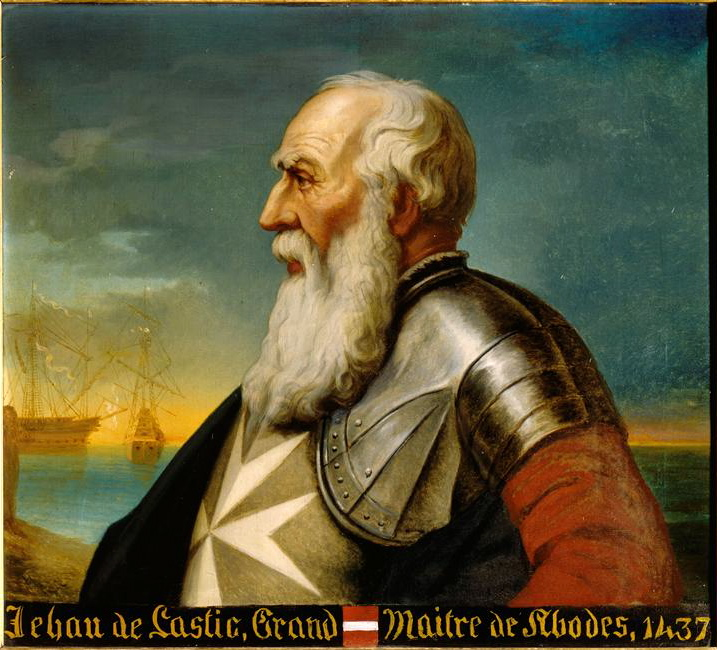
Jean de Lastic, 1437–1454

Jean de Lastic was Grand Master of the Order of the Knights Hospitaller from 1437 until his death in 1454. Counted as the 35th Grand Master of the order (or the 36th if the partially recognized Riccardo Caracciolo is included), he was the first to actually use the title "Grand Master" (Grandis Magister). During his rule, in 1440 and 1444, Mamluk fleets attacking Rhodes were successfully repelled. During this time, the order was at the zenith of its power, and played a significant military role in the defense of the Mediterranean against Turkish encroachment. His rule still saw the Fall of Constantinople of 1453, initiating a century of Ottoman naval dominance over the eastern Mediterranean. Under his successor, Jacques de Milly, the order was also divided by internal dispute.

Preceded by Anton Flavian de Ripa	Grand Master of the Knights Hospitaller; 1437–1454	Succeeded by Jacques de Milly
