= Siege of Rhodes (1444) =

Egyptian Mamluk siege of Rhodes

- A 1450 map of the eastern Mediterranean.
Date	10 August – 18 September 1444
Location	Rhodes
Result	Knights Hospitaller victory

Belligerents
Mamluk Sultanate	Knights Hospitaller

Commanders and leaders
Aynal Gecut	Jean de Lastic

Strength
85 ships	

The siege of Rhodes was a military engagement involving the Knights Hospitaller and Mamluk Sultanate. The Mamluk fleet landed on the island of Rhodes on 10 August 1444, besieging its citadel. Clashes took place on the western walls of the city and at the Mandraki harbor. On 18 September 1444, the Mamluks departed from the island and lifted the siege.

== Background ==
The Order of the Hospital (Knights Hospitaller) was founded in Jerusalem in 1070. It became one of the most important military orders. In 1291, the Fall of Acre forced the Order to move its base from the Holy Lands to Limassol in Cyprus. Cyprus offered limited economic opportunities, making the Order dependent on donations from Western Europe and involved them in quarrels with King Henry II of Cyprus, while the loss of Acre and the Holy Land led to widespread questioning on the purpose of the monastic orders, and proposals to confiscate their possessions. Foulques de Villaret was elected as Grand Master of the Knights Hospitaller in 1305, immediately beginning preparation for the conquest of Rhodes, which would ensure him a liberty of action that he could not have as long as the Order remained on Cyprus, and would provide a new base for war against the Turks.

Although the island was a Byzantine possession, the Empire seemed to be unable to fully protect its territorial integrity. Foulques de Villaret entered into a contract with a Genoese mercenary Vignolo de' Vignoli who agreed to assist the Hospitallers in return for privileges on the newly conquered island. On 23 June, Villaret and Vignolo sailed from Limassol, with two war galleys and four other vessels, carrying a force of 35 Knights, six Levantine horsemen, and 500 foot soldiers. To them were added some Genoese ships. Once the initial assault on the city of Rhodes failed, the Hospitallers focused on the island's countryside which they managed to conquer within a month. The defenders of the citadel offered staunch resistance repelling numerous attacks, until its eventual fall on 15 August 1310.

The Hospitallers then moved their convent and hospital from Cyprus to Rhodes, and resettled the island. Their hold on the island was solidified through the enforcement of a papal ban on trade between Christian states and Mamluk Egypt. Genoese and Venetian trading routes were cut in the process, whilst Karpathos and Leros were added to the order's domain. The Hospitallers scored victories against Muslim rivals at Amorgos and Chios in 1312 and 1319 respectively. In 1320, the order's navy thwarted a Turkish invasion of the island by halting the advance of the Turkish 80 vessel fleet.

In the winter of 1443, Grand Master Jean de Lastic sent a letter to the King of Aragon Alfonso V of Aragon lamenting the hardships faced by the order and requesting that its members residing on his possessions return to Rhodes to protect it. Alfonso acted as a patron of the Order, closely collaborating with the two previous Masters who were both of Catalan origin. The Duke of Burgundy Philip the Good and Pope Eugene IV were among those who provided the Hospitallers with auxiliary ships and supplies on their way back to Rhodes. In the meantime, a Mamluk fleet had already set sail towards the same destination.

== Siege ==
In August 1444, a Mamluk force under Aynal Gecut landed at the Hospitaller held island of Kastellorizo, razing its castle before departing for Rhodes. On 10 August, the Mamluk fleet consisting of 85 ships appeared in the channel between Rhodes and Asia Minor. The Mamluks landed at the north–western edge of the island, north of Trianta. Facing no resistance they captured positions adjacent to the Rhodes citadel, and began firing arrows at the city's defenders who responded in kind. The following day, the Mamluks focused their attention on the western side of the castle, especially the poorly defended gate of Agios Antonios, bombarding it with their artillery. A second Mamluk column raided the Mandraki port to the east of the castle, destroying numerous ships and causing heavy casualties to their crews. Once the gate was secured the Grand Master ordered a foray into Mandraki. French and Catalan members of the order pushed the Mamluks out of the harbor, slaying many and forcing others to flee. Hostilities were halted for a period of time as the two forces reorganized. On 10 September, the Hospitallers attacked the Santa Maria outpost south–west of the Agios Antonios gate. Heavy fighting ensued and the Mamluks eventually withdrew taking their dead and wounded with them. On 13 September, the Mamluks packed their tents and lifted the siege contrary to the orders of their sultan, leaving for the location of their initial landing. Jean de Lastic proposed conducting an assault on the Mamluks in order to disrupt their withdrawal, however his military council rejected the plan. On 18 September, the Mamluks finished embarking on their ships and headed to the direction of Asia Minor.

== Aftermath ==
Despite the success of the Hospitallers in the 1480 siege of the island, Rhodes became increasingly isolated from other Christian states. It was ultimately conquered by the Ottoman Empire in 1522, forcing the Order to once again relocate their headquarters to Malta.
