= Anton Flavian de Ripa =

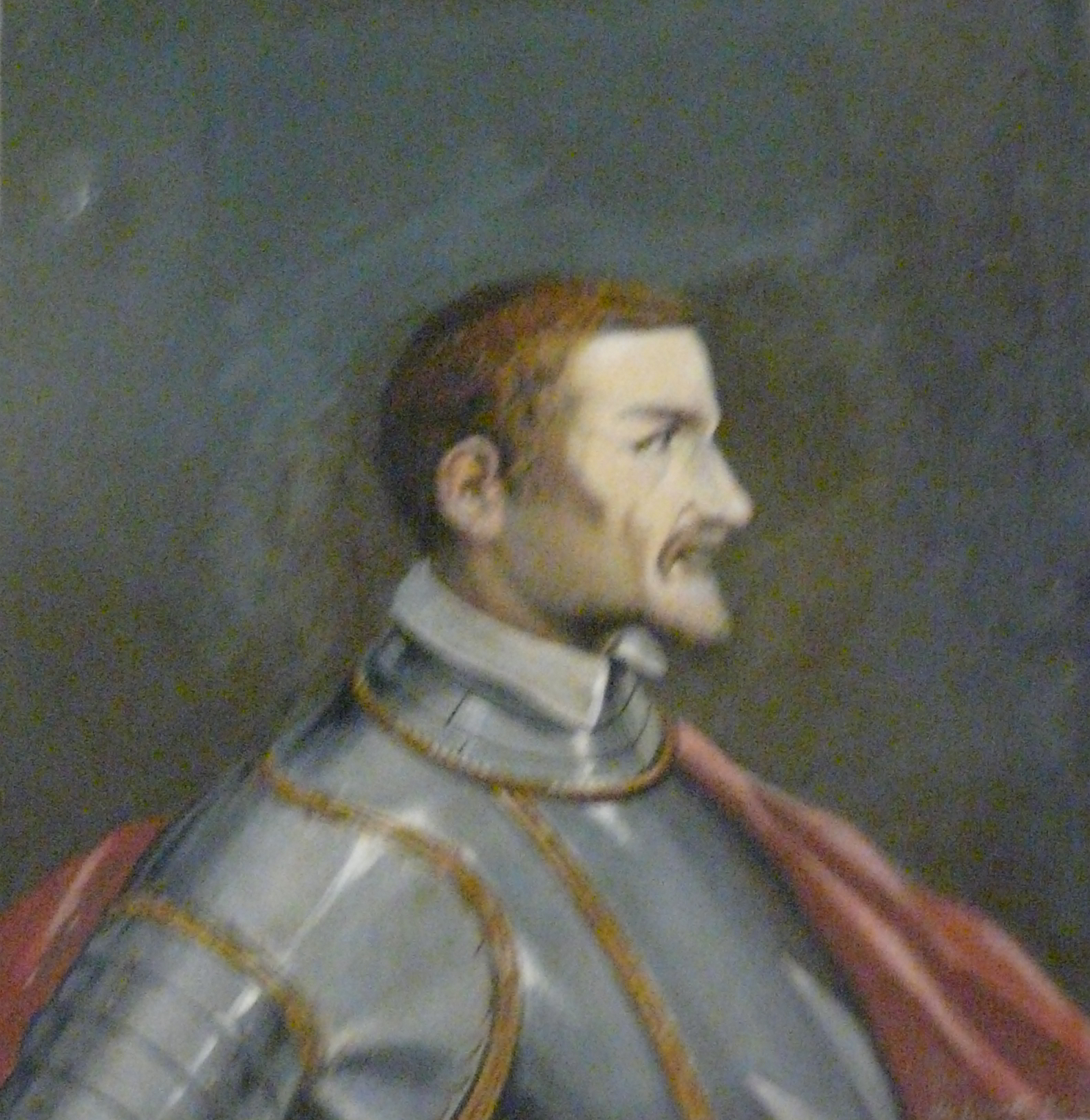
Imaginary portrait of Anton Flavian de Ripa in the Palace of the Grand Master of the Knights of Rhodes

Anton Fluvian de Ripa was the 35th Grand Master of the Knights Hospitaller from 1421 until his death in Rhodes in 1437.

== Honours ==
Arms of Anton Flavian

Preceded by Philibert de Naillac	Grand Master of the Knights Hospitaller; 1421–1437	Succeeded by Jean de Lastic
