= Robert de Juilly =

Grand Master of the Knights Hospitaller

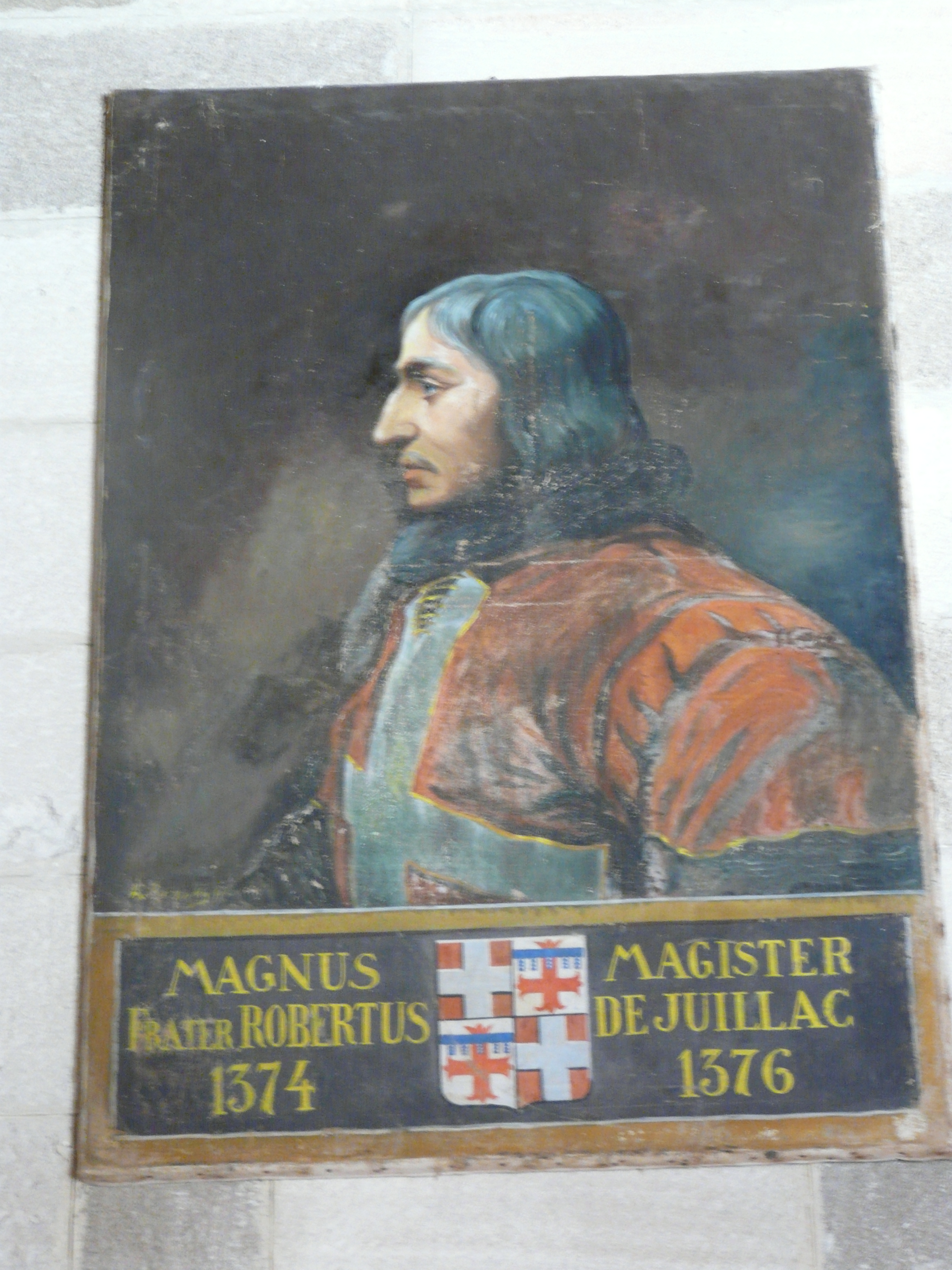
- Robert de Juliac
- Died: 29 July 1377
- Other names: Robert de Juliac
- Occupation: Grand Master
- Office: Grand Master of the Knights Hospitaller
- Predecessor: Raymond Berenger
- Successor: Juan Fernández de Heredia

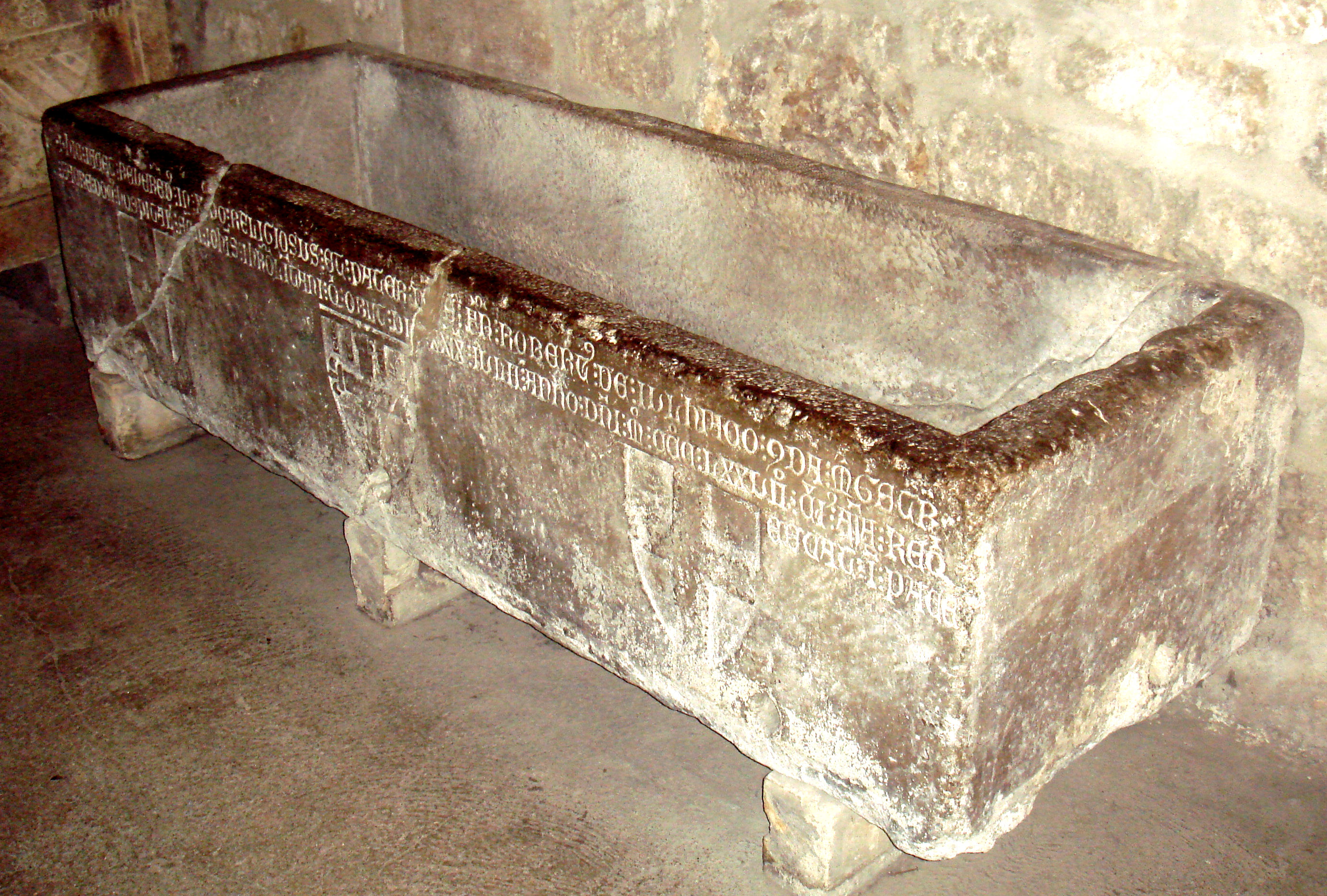
Tomb of Robert de Juliac, Rhodes. Musée de Cluny.

Robert de Juilly or Robert de Juliac (died 29 July 1377) was the Grand Master of the Knights Hospitaller from 1374 to his death. He was succeeded by Juan Fernández de Heredia.

Preceded by Raymond Berenger	Grand Master of the Knights Hospitaller; 1374–1377	Succeeded by Juan Fernández de Heredia
