= Raymond Berengar (Grand Master of the Knights Hospitaller) =

Aragonese knight

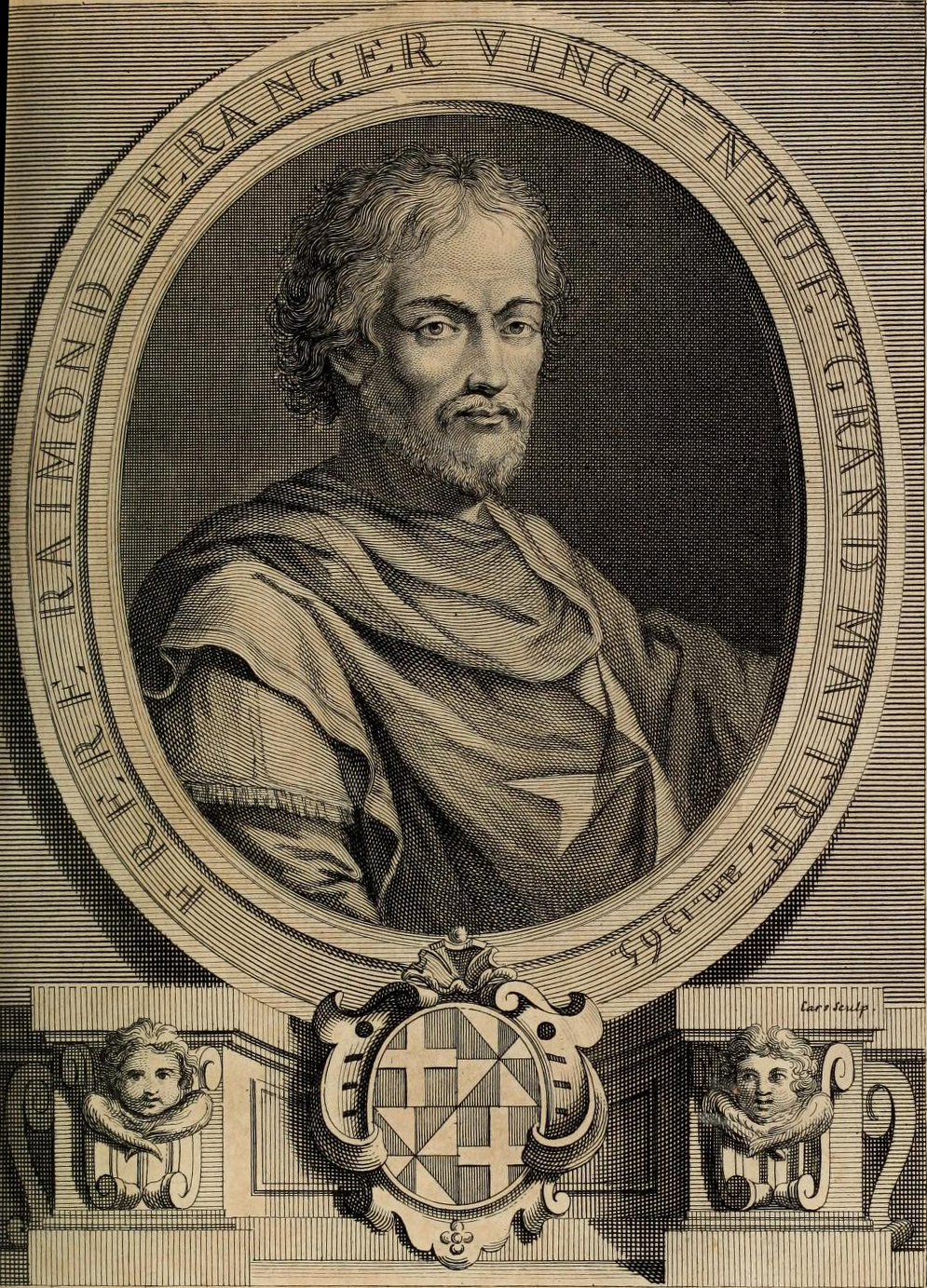
Raymond Berengar

Raymond Berengar (died 1374) was a knight from the Dauphiné region of France and the 30th Grand Master of the Knights Hospitaller from 1365 to 1374 while the Order was based in Rhodes. He was succeeded by Robert de Juilly.

Preceded by Roger de Pins	Grand Master of the Knights Hospitaller; 1365–1374	Succeeded by Robert de Juilly
