= Jacques de Milly =

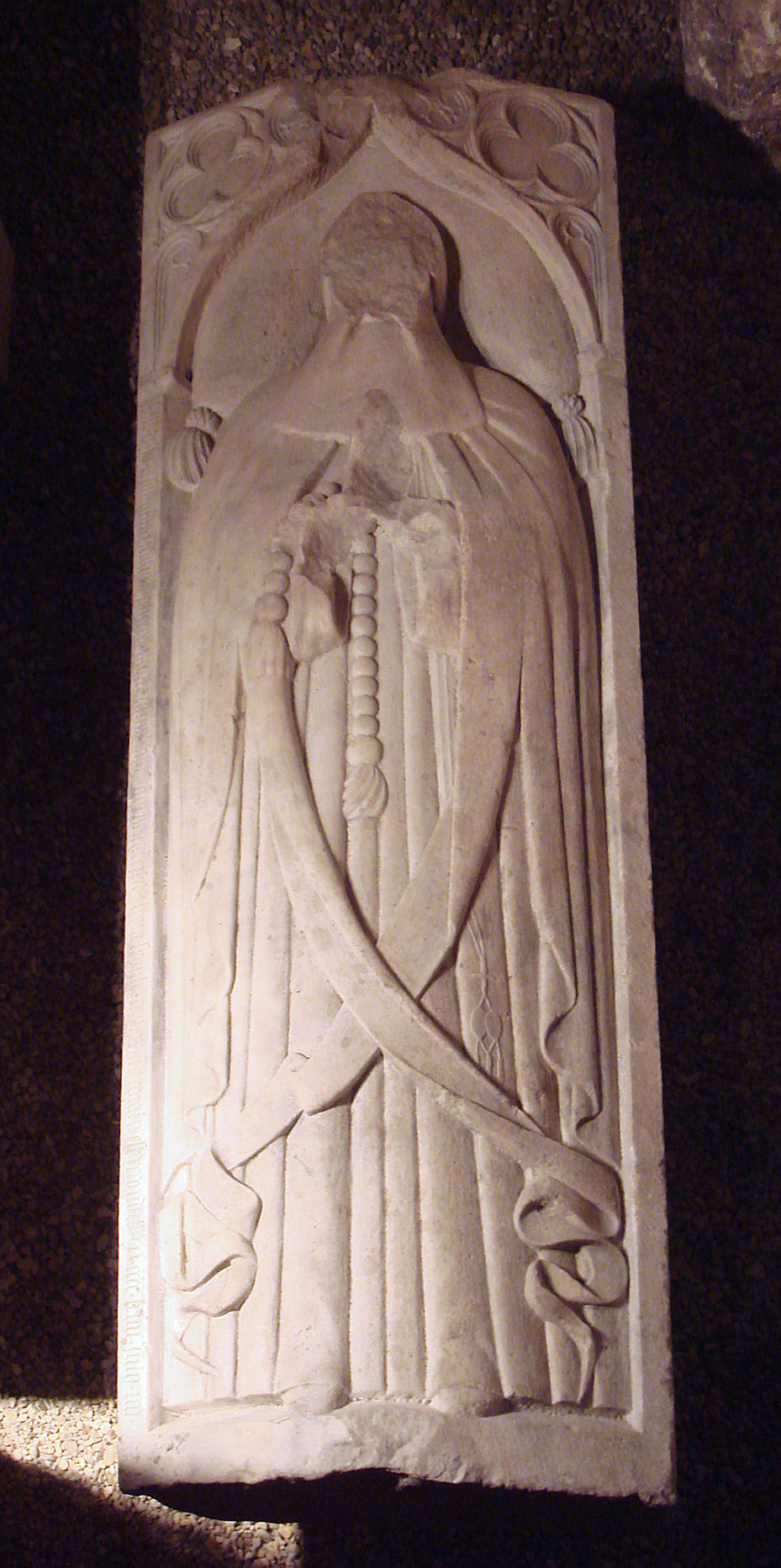
Tombstone of Jacques de Milly, 37th Grand-Master of the Order of the Hospitallers, 1461. Musée de Cluny, Paris.

Jacques de Milly was the 37th Grand Master of the Order of the Knights Hospitaller from 1454 until 1461, when he died.

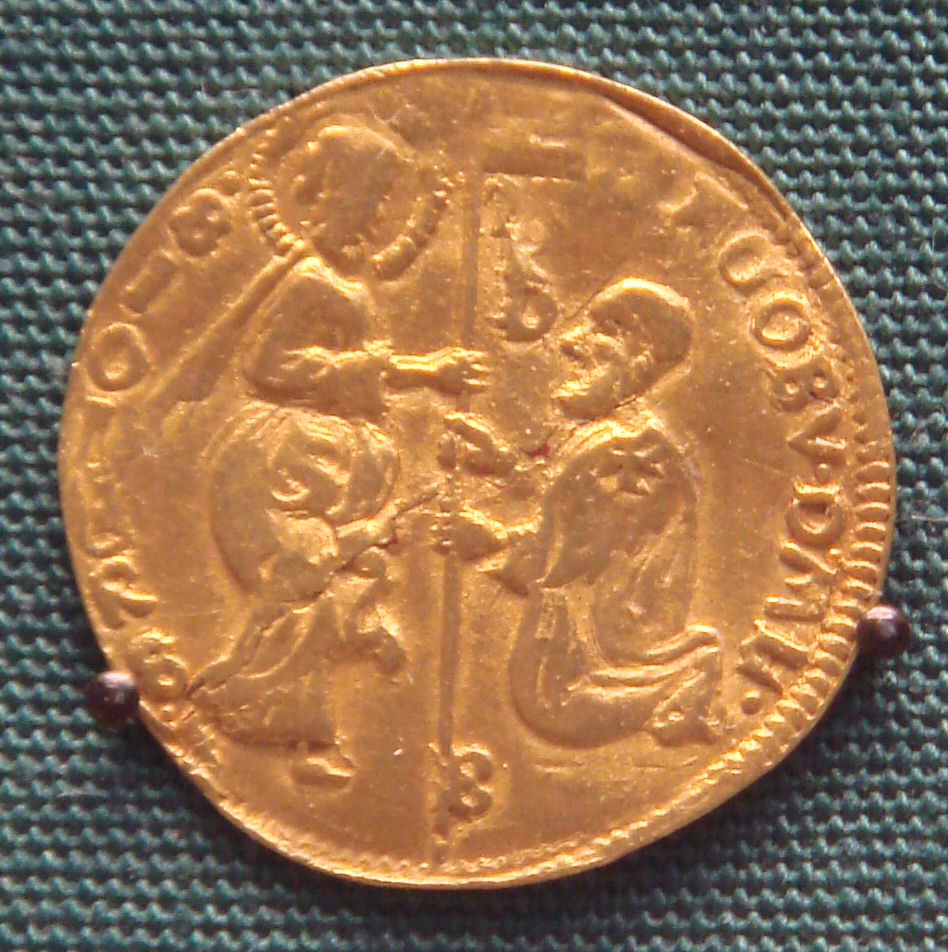
Gold coin of Jacques de Milly, Master of the Knights of Rhodes, 1454–1461. British Museum.

Preceded by Jean de Lastic	Grand Master of the Knights Hospitaller; 1454–1461	Succeeded by Piero Raimondo Zacosta
