= Philibert de Naillac =

Grand Master of the Knights Hospitaller

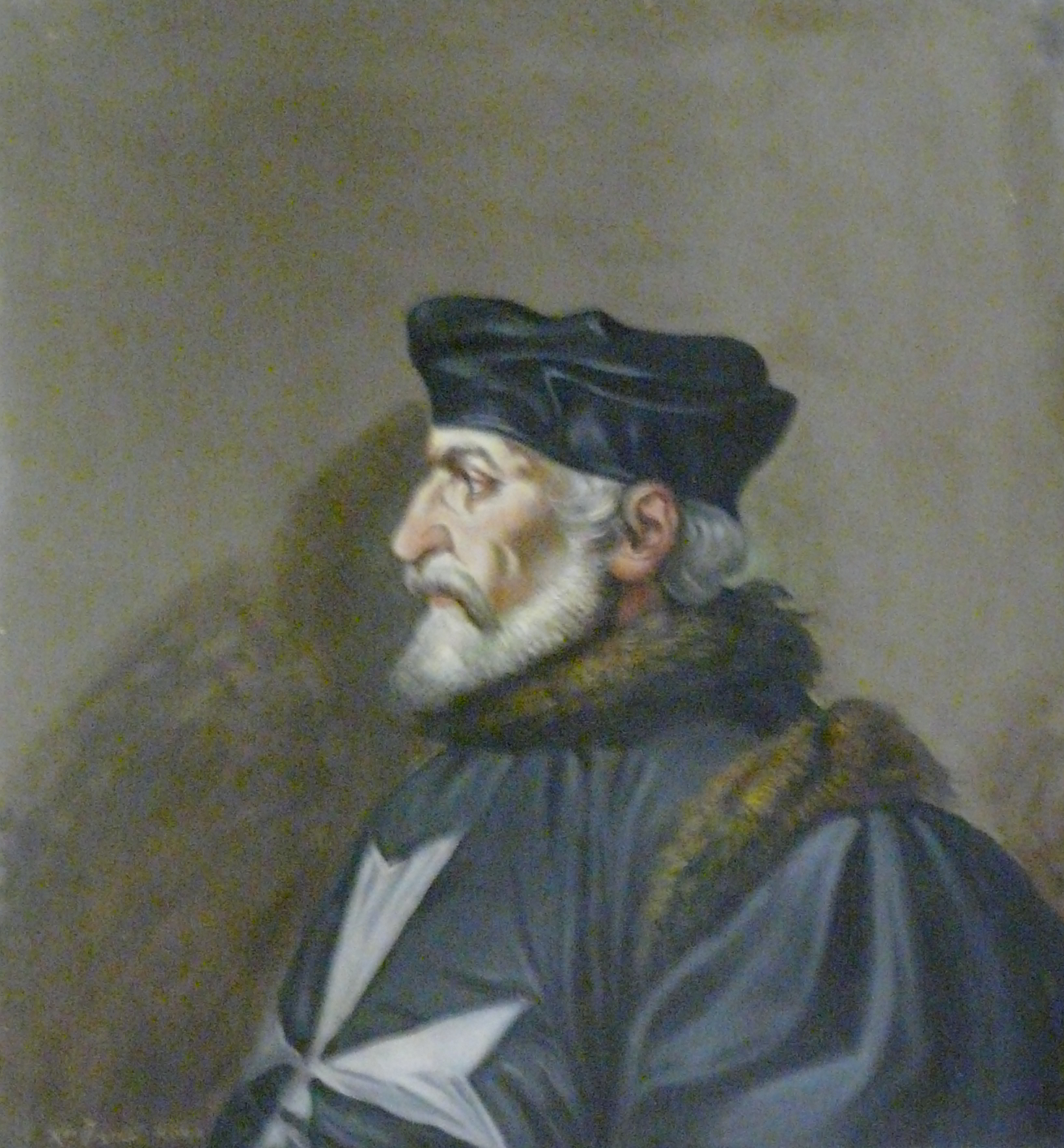
Imaginary portrait of Philibert de Naillac in the Palace of the Grand Master of the Knights of Rhodes

Philibert de Naillac (c. 1340 – 1421) was grand master of the Knights Hospitaller from 1396 until his death in Rhodes in 1421. Prior to his election he was grand-prior of Aquitaine.

== Life ==
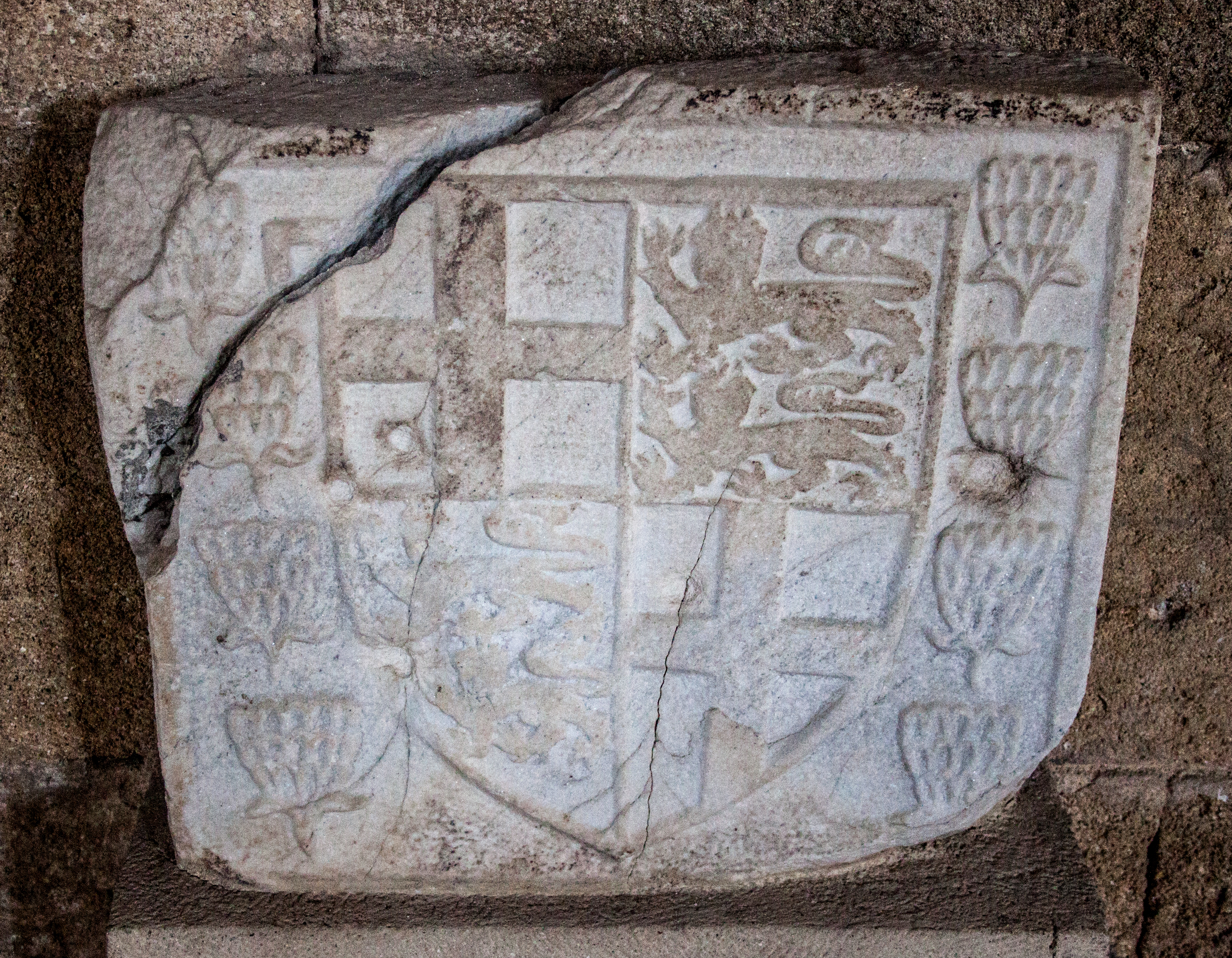
Coat of arms of Philibert de Naillac

Philibert de Naillac was born about 1340 of a noble family. But little is known of his personal history. He became master of the Order of the Knights of St. John of Jerusalem in 1376, and engaged in the Crusades, and was greatly distinguished by his valour and skill in warfare. He was prominently engaged in the battle of Nicopolis, and served the Christian interests by his treaties with the Saracens. Thus he concluded a treaty with the Sultan of Egypt, which gave the Christians permission to enclose the Holy Sepulchre at Jerusalem with a wall; to maintain six knights of the Order of St. John within the city, free from all tribute, who should be permitted to carry on the hospitable duties of their profession in favour of all pilgrims led thither by devotion; that Christian slaves might be redeemed, either by purchase or by exchange with a Saracen; and that convents might be maintained in Jerusalem and in the other principal cities of the Holy Land. In 1415 internal dissension threatened the very existence of the Order of St. John. Naillac's wise counsels prevented all disgraceful proceedings; and when he died, in 1421, "he left the fraternity, at whose head he had been placed for so many years, at union with itself, at peace with its neighbours, and in a most flourishing state of prosperity."

== See also ==
- List of grandmasters of the Knights Hospitaller

== Sources ==
Attribution:

- Wokjian, J. H. (1876). "Naillac, Philibert De". In McClintock, John; Strong, James (eds.). Cyclopædia of Biblical, Theological and Ecclesiastical Literature. Vol. 6. New York, NY: Harper & Brothers. p. 833.

Preceded by Juan Fernández de Heredia	Grand Master of the Knights Hospitaller; 1396–1421	Succeeded by Anton Flavian de Ripa
