= Riccardo Caracciolo =

Italian nobleman (c. 1350 - 1395)

Riccardo Caracciolo (died 18 May 1395) was an Italian nobleman from the Kingdom of Naples, who was a rival Grand Master of the Knights Hospitaller.

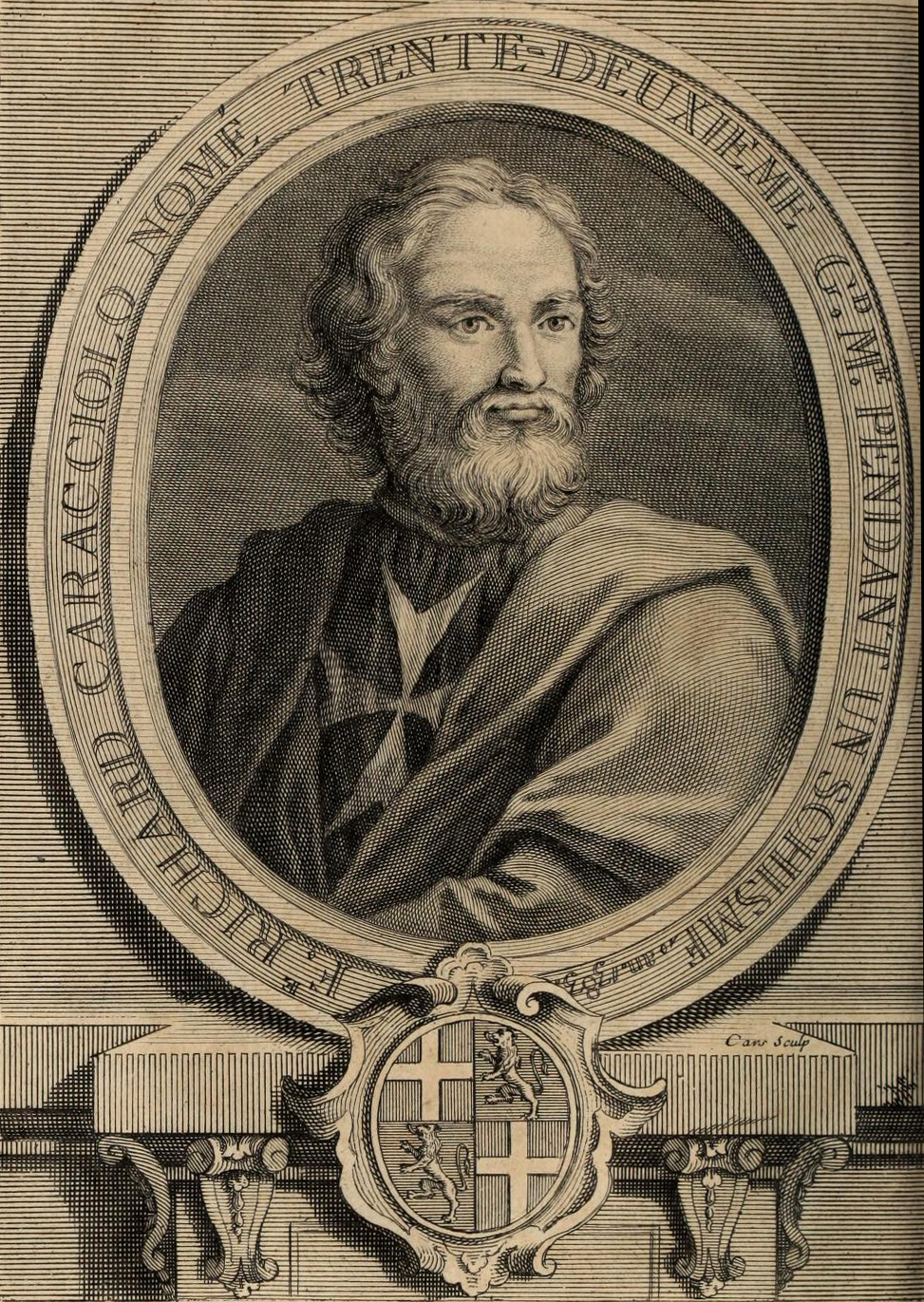
The portrait of Riccardo Caracciolo

== Biography ==
Caracciolo was born most likely in Naples, in the first half of the 14th century. He was perhaps a descendant of Niccolò Caracciolo, a chamberlain and marshal of King Robert I of Naples.

Caracciolo entered the Order of the Knights Hospitaller at a young age. In 1378 he was appointed as prior of Capua. In 1382, pope Urban VI deposed the order's Grand Master, Juan Fernández de Heredia, who had sided for Antipope Clement VII and, in the April 1383, replaced him with Caracciolo. The latter was supported by the priories of Rome, Messina, Barletta, Pisa and Capua, as well as the prior of Bohemia. They were followed by the knights of England and Ireland in 1384, and later also Hungary and part of Germany. However, the main base of the order, in Rhodes, remained faithful to Heredia.

Caracciolo spent his period as master mostly at the papal court, also after Urban died, being replaced by Boniface IX. In 1391 he was chosen as mediator between the warring Republic of Venice and Gian Galeazzo Visconti, Duke of Milan; he later performed the same tasks with other Italian rival communes and lords.

He died in Rome in 1395, and was buried in Santa Maria del Priorato.
