= Pierre de Vieille-Brioude =

French nobleman (c. 1200–1242)

18th Grand Masters of the Knights Hospitaller
- In office 1240–1242
- Preceded by: Bertrand de Comps
- Succeeded by: Guillaume de Chateauneuf

Personal details
- Died: 1242 Margat Castle

Pierre de Vieille-Brioude (or Vieille-Bride; c. 1200 – after 1242) was a French nobleman from Auvergne who was the eighteenth Grand Master of the Knights Hospitaller between 1240 and 1242, succeeding Bertrand de Comps. He was succeeded by Guillaume de Chateauneuf.

== Career ==
The first mention of Pierre de Vieille-Brioude as brother dates from February 1216. He became Grand Commander (Grand Précepteur de l'Hospital) between 18 July 1237 and April 1239. He succeeded Bertrand de Comps as Grand Master of the Order between the end of 1239 and 1240.

== Battle of Gaza ==
In 1239, during the Barons' Crusade, de Vieille-Brioude accompanied Theobald I of Navarre who left France with 1,000 to 1,500 French knights for the Holy Land. He had had his hand forced by his traveling companions against the advice of de Vieille-Brioude, representing the Hospitaller and the Knights Templar and Teutonic Knights, to march on Gaza to fight the sultan of Damascus, al-Salih Ismail. At the Battle of Gaza on 13 November 1239, he suffered such a bloody defeat that de Vieille-Brioude and the Templar Grand Master Armand de Lavoie had, with great difficulty, dissuaded Theobald from attacking the next day at the risk of turning a defeat into a rout. He fell back to Jaffa and Ascalon.

But in the summer of 1240, de Vieille-Brioude gave consideration to the proposal of al-Salih Ismail who wanted to reconquer Damascus. He offered the Franks the restitution of Safed, Beaufort Castle, the territories between Sidon and Tiberias, and those below the Jordan. Contrary to Bertrand de Comps' opinion, but with the agreement of the Templars, he took possession of these places. He had allied himself with his remaining forces, in the absence of the Hospitallers and a large number of Crusaders, with al-Salih Ismail, who was to be defeated in his reconquest of Damascus. Theobald then fell back to Ascalon, implementing new fortifications, and leaving the Holy Land in September 1240.

== Conflict of the Templars and Hospitallers ==
Shortly after the departure of Theobald, an English host arrived at Acre on 11 October 1240 led by Richard of Cornwall. He completed the fortifications of Ascalon in March 1241 when the treaty with the Ayyubids was presented for Richard's ratification. Richard, on the advice of de Vieille-Brioude, Hugh of Burgundy and Walter of Jaffa, ratified the treaty on 23 April 1241 and returned to England on May 3.

Richard did not have great esteem for "the two twin brothers" as he called the Templars and the Hospitallers, who charged with defending the Holy Land, competing for their wealth instead of putting it at the service of the salvation of the kingdom. They were oblivious to the pope's orders, and were always ready to fight against each other. The conflict began as soon as Richard departed, with the Templars, refusing the truce initiated by Richard, attacked the Hospitallers and the Teutonic Order, who had accepted it. Armand de Lavoie besieged them at Acre, cutting off their food, and to prevent them from burying their dead outside their convent. This occurred in the absence of de Vieille-Brioude who was fighting in Margat against an-Nasir Yusuf of Aleppo.

== Gravestone ==
His gravestone was found in the crypt of the Hospitaller commandery of Saint-Jean-d'Acre :

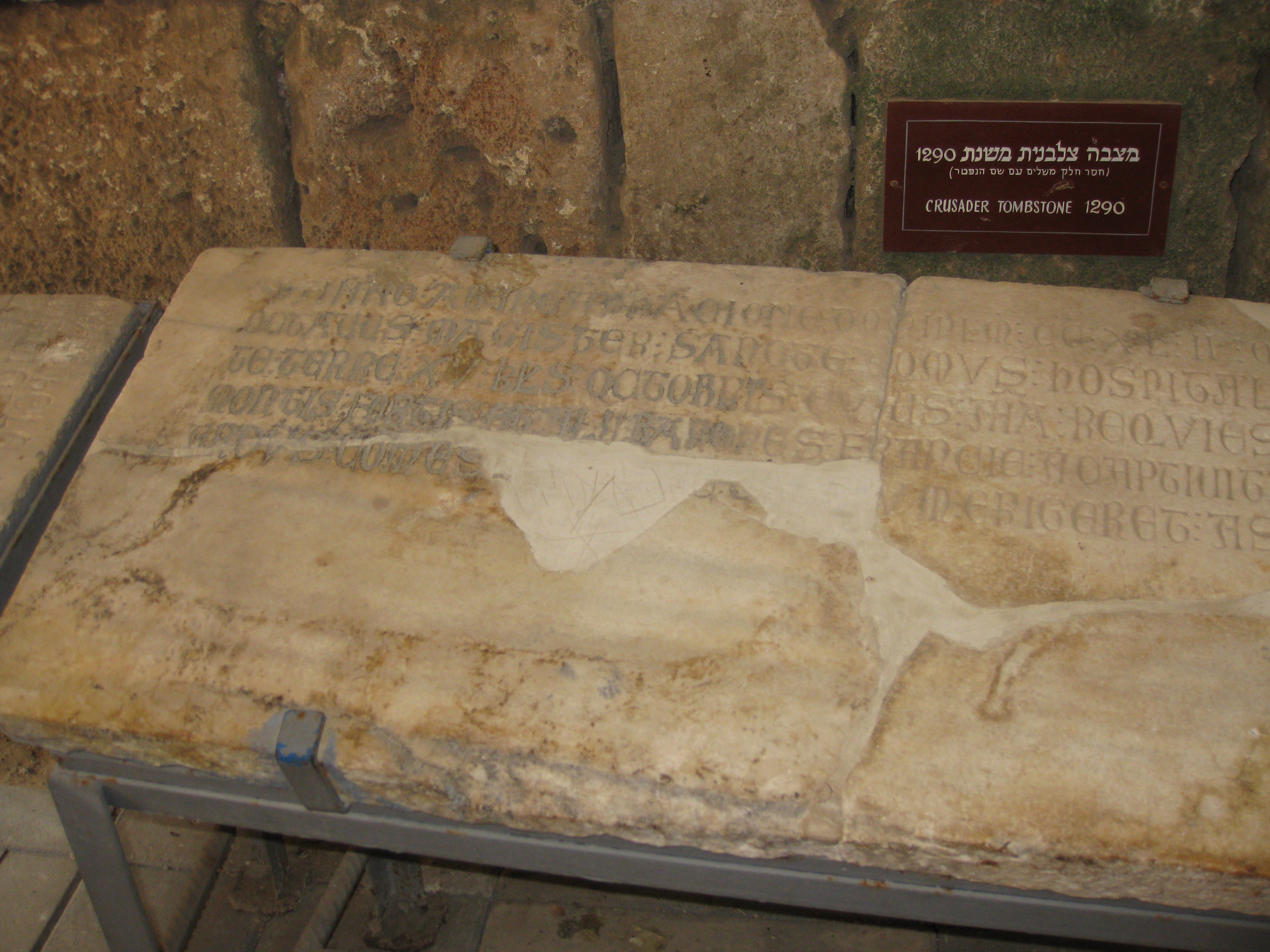

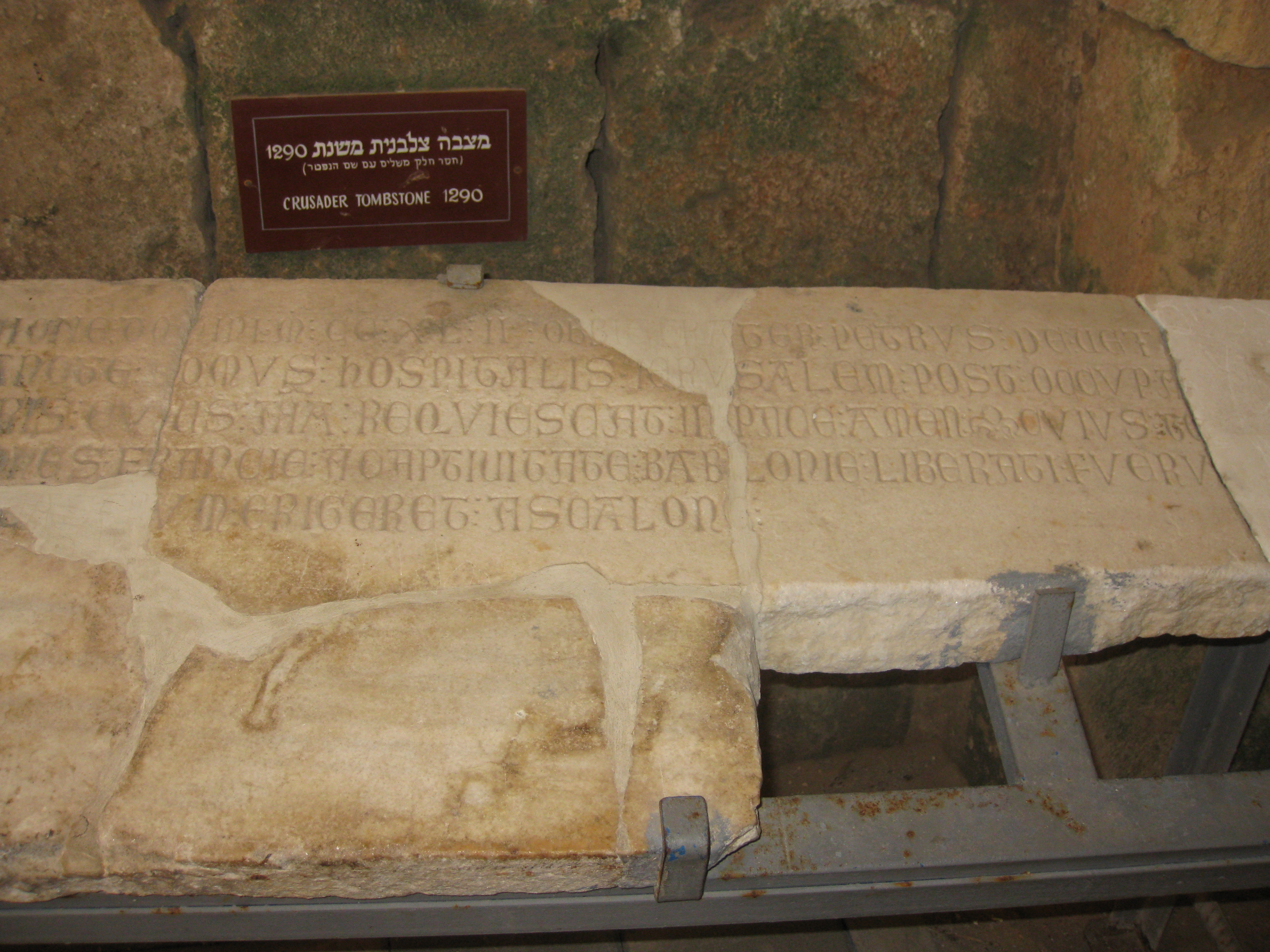

=== Epitaph ===
☩ ANNO ⠇AB ⠇INCARNACIONE ⠇DOMINI ⠇M ⠇CC ⠇XL ⠇II ⠇OBIIT ⠇FRATER ⠇PETRUS ⠇DE ⠇VETERI ⠇BRIVATO ⠇
OCTAVUS ⠇MAGISTER ⠇SANCTE ⠇DOMUS ⠇HOSPITALIS ⠇IERUSALEM ⠇POST ⠇OCCUPATIONEM ⠇SANC
TE ⠇TERRE ⠇XV ⠇KLS ⠇OCTOBRIS ⠇CUIUS ⠇AIA ⠇REQUIESCAT ⠇IN ⠇PACE ⠇AMEN ⠇⚜ CUIUS ⠇TEMPORE ⠇COMES ⠇
MONTIS ⠇FORTIS ⠇ET ⠇ALII ⠇BARONES ⠇FRANCIE ⠇A CAPTIVITATE ⠇BABILONIE ⠇LIBERATI ⠇FUERUNT ⠇DUM ⠇RICH
ARDUS ⠇COMES ⠇CORNUBIE ⠇CASTRUM ⠇ERIGERET ⠇ASCALONE ⠇

☩ The year 1242 of the incarnation of the Lord passed away brother Pierre de Vieille-Brioude, eighth master of the Holy House of the Jerusalem Hospital since the occupation of the Holy Land, the XV of the calends of October (September 17). That his soul rests in peace. Amen. ⚜ At that time, Amaury VI de Montfort and other barons of France were freed from captivity in Cairo and Richard of Cornwall built the fortress of Ascalon.

== See also ==
- Cartulaire général de l'Ordre des Hospitaliers
- List of Knights Hospitaller sites
- Langue (Knights Hospitaller)
- Flags of the Knights Hospitaller

== Bibliography ==
- Bronstein, Judith (2005). The Hospitallers and the Holy Land: Financing the Latin East, 1187-1274. Boydell Press. ISBN 9781843831310.
- Delaville Le Roulx, Joseph (1904). Les Hospitaliers en Terre Sainte et à Chypre (1100-1310). E. Leroux, Paris.
- Demurger, Alain (2013). Les Hospitaliers, De Jérusalem à Rhodes 1050-1317. Tallandier, Paris. ISBN 979-1021000605.
- Flavigny, Bertrand Galimard (2006). Histoire de l'ordre de Malte. Perrin, Paris. ISBN 978-2262021153.
- Harot, Eugène (1911). Essai d'armorial des grands maîtres de l'Ordre de Saint-Jean de Jérusalem. Collegio araldico.
- Josserand, Philippe (2009). Prier et combattre, Dictionnaire européen des ordres militaires au Moyen Âge. Fayard, Paris. ISBN 978-2213627205.
- Lock, Peter (2006). The Routledge Companion to the Crusades. Routledge. doi:10.4324/9780203389638. ISBN 0-415-39312-4.
- Murray, Alan V. (2006). The Crusades—An Encyclopedia. ABC-CLIO. ISBN 978-1-57607-862-4. Archived from the original on 2023-03-26.
- Nicholson, Helen J. (2001). The Knights Hospitaller. Boydell & Brewer. ISBN 978-1843830382.
- Runciman, Steven (1954). A History of the Crusades, Volume Three: The Kingdom of Acre and the Later Crusades. Cambridge University Press. ISBN 9780521347723.
- Setton, Kenneth M. (1969). A History of the Crusades. University of Wisconsin Press.
- Tyerman, Christopher (2006). God's War: A New History of the Crusades. Belknap Press. ISBN 978-0-674-02387-1.
- Vann, Theresa M. (2006). Order of the Hospital. The Crusades––An Encyclopedia, pp. 598–605.

Preceded by Bertrand de Comps	Grand Master of the Knights Hospitaller; 1240–1242	Succeeded by Guillaume de Chateauneuf
