= Guérin Lebrun =

Guérin Lebrun (died 1236 at Acre) was the sixteenth Grand Master of the Knights Hospitaller, serving between 1231 and 1236. He succeeded Bertrand de Thessy in 1230 or 1231. As he was Prior of France, he was likely from France and is generally referred to by the single name of Guérin. He was succeeded by Bertrand de Comps.

== Biography ==
Guérin was a Chevalier of the Order and Prior of France through 1230 when he was appointed as Grand Master. The date of his elevation is unknown but at least as early as 1 May 1231. The last mention of his predecessor, Bertrand de Thessy, dates from 13 May 1230. His magisterium ended between his last official act in May 1236 and 20 September 1236, the first act of his successor Bertrand de Comps. Guérin judicially avoided the dispute between the Ibelins, the regents of Henry I of Cyprus, and Holy Roman Emperor Frederick II.

In 1219, during the Fifth Crusade, a group of Antiochene noblemen had risen up against Raymond-Roupen, then ruler of the Principality of Antioch, who had lost the support of Leo of Armenia. Raymond-Roupen sought refuge in the citadel, controlled by the Hospitaller, but he was forced to leave Antioch. He entrusted the citadel to the Hospitallers. Bohemond IV of Antioch quickly seized the principality. The Hospitallers abandoned the citadel without resistance.

Before long, Bohemond IV granted Jabala, still to be conquered, to the Knights Templar although the town had been previously promised to the Hospitallers. Papal legate Pelagius Galvani brokered an agreement between the military orders, dividing the town between them. However, Bohemond IV remained hostile to the Hospitallers. After he confiscated their property in Antioch, Pelagius excommunicated him.

At the Hospitallers' request, Gregory IX repeated the excommunication of Bohemond in March 1230. He authorized Gerald of Lausanne, Patriarch of Jerusalem, to lift the ban if Bohemond agreed to make peace with the Hospitallers. With the mediation of Gerald and the Ibelins, Bohemond and the Hospitallers made a treaty which was signed on 26 October 1231. Bohemond confirmed the Hospitallers' right to hold Jabala and a nearby fortress and granted them money fiefs in both Tripoli and Antioch. The knights renounced the privileges that Raymond-Roupen had granted to them. Before long, Gerald of Lausanne lifted the excommunication and sent the treaty to Rome to be confirmed by the Holy See.

John of Ibelin, the Old Lord of Beirut and leader of Frederick's opponents in the kingdoms of Jerusalem and Cyprus, tried to convince Bohemond IV to support their cause. John sent his son, Balian III of Beirut, to Tripoli to negotiate with Bohemond, but the elderly prince remained neutral in the conflict. On 10 April 1233, the pope lifted the excommunication of Bohemond IV, who died shortly after, just weeks before the pope's confirmation of his treaty with the Hospitallers came to Tripoli. He was regarded as a great jurist by his contemporaries.

In 1233, the Hospitallers under Guérin took a leading part in the successful attack on the principality of Hama, ruled by al-Malek al-Modaffer, emir of Konya (and great-grandson of Saladin's brother Nur ad-Din Shahanshah and son-in-law of the sultan al-Kamil) The motive of this conflict was no more than the refusal of the emir to pay them the tribute due and seems to point to an increasing secularization of the Order's spirit. The army gathered at the foot of Krak des Chevaliers, in the plain of the Beqaa Valley. It included Hospitallers, a force of Knights Templar under Armand de Périgord, knights of the kingdom under Pierre d'Avalon, Cypriot knights under John of Ibelin, and Antiochene knights under Henry of Antioch. They pillaged Montferrand and its surroundings, returning without incident.

In 1236, pope Gregory IX threatened both the Hospitallers and the Templars with excommunication, to prevent their forming an alliance with the Assassins, and in 1238 issued a bull in which he inveighed against the scandalous lives and relaxed discipline of the Hospitallers. Guérin's last known action was in May 1236 and his successor Bertrand de Comps is dated as early as 20 September 1236.

== See also ==
- Cartulaire général de l'Ordre des Hospitaliers
- List of Knights Hospitaller sites
- Langue (Knights Hospitaller)
- Flags of the Knights Hospitaller

== Bibliography ==
- Abulafia, David (1992). Frederick II: A Medieval Emperor. Oxford University Press. ISBN 019508040-8.
- Bronstein, Judith (2005). The Hospitallers and the Holy Land: Financing the Latin East, 1187-1274. Boydell Press. ISBN 9781843831310.
- Delaville Le Roulx, Joseph (1904). Les Hospitaliers en Terre Sainte et à Chypre (1100-1310). E. Leroux, Paris.
- Demurger, Alain (2013). Les Hospitaliers, De Jérusalem à Rhodes 1050-1317. Tallandier, Paris. ISBN 979-1021000605.
- Flavigny, Bertrand Galimard (2006). Histoire de l'ordre de Malte. Perrin, Paris. ISBN 978-2262021153.
- Hardwicke, Mary Nickerson (1969). The Crusader States, 1192–1243 (PDF). A History of the Crusades (Setton), Volume II.
- Harot, Eugène (1911). Essai d'armorial des grands maîtres de l'Ordre de Saint-Jean de Jérusalem. Collegio araldico.
- Josserand, Philippe (2009). Prier et combattre, Dictionnaire européen des ordres militaires au Moyen Âge. Fayard, Paris. ISBN 978-2213627205.
- Lock, Peter (2006). The Routledge Companion to the Crusades. Routledge. doi:10.4324/9780203389638. ISBN 0-415-39312-4.
- Murray, Alan V. (2006). The Crusades—An Encyclopedia. ABC-CLIO. ISBN 978-1-57607-862-4.
- Nicholson, Helen J. (2001). The Knights Hospitaller. Boydell & Brewer. ISBN 978-1843830382.
- Runciman, Steven (1954). A History of the Crusades, Volume Three: The Kingdom of Acre and the Later Crusades. Cambridge University Press. ISBN 978-0521347723.
- Setton, Kenneth M. (1969). A History of the Crusades. Six Volumes. University of Wisconsin Press.
- Tyerman, Christopher (2006). God's War: A New History of the Crusades. Belknap Press. ISBN 978-0-674-02387-1.
- Vann, Theresa M. (2006). Order of the Hospital. The Crusades––An Encyclopedia, pp. 598–605.

Catholic Church titles
Preceded by Bertrand de Thessy	Grand Master of the Knights Hospitaller; 1231–1236	Succeeded by Bertrand de Comps
