= Garin of Montaigu =

Fourteenth Grand Master of the Knights Hospitaller

Garin of Montaigu (French: Guérin, French pronunciation: [ɡeʁɛ̃]; died 1228) was a nobleman from Auvergne, who became the fourteenth grand master of the Knights Hospitaller, serving from 1207–1228. He succeeded the Grand Master Geoffroy le Rat after his death in 1206, and was succeeded by Bertrand de Thessy.

== Biography ==
Garin of Montaigu was elected grand master in the summer of 1207, between 22 May and 1 October. He was Marshal of the Order and participated in the Fifth Crusade. He died a natural death during the reconstruction of the wall of Sidon between 11 November 1227 and 1 March 1228. He was described as "the figure of one of the greatest masters of whom the Hospital has reason to be proud ".

Tradition would have it that he was a native of Auvergne and that he was the brother of Peter of Montaigu, grand master of the Knights Templar from 1219 to 1232, and of Eustorge of Montaigu, archbishop of Nicosia. Unfortunately, the nobiliaries of Auvergne do not establish to which of the Montaigu families Garin can be linked.

== Principality of Antioch ==
Like his two predecessors, Garin found himself involved in the affairs of the Principality of Antioch through the War of the Antiochene Succession created by the opening of the will of Bohémond III of Antioch. This had indicated as his successor his grandson Raymond-Roupen. Bohémond IV of Antioch, second son of Bohémond III and Count of Tripoli, did not accept this will. Leo I of Armenia, as the maternal great-uncle, took the side of Raymond-Roupen. However, without waiting for the death of his father, Bohémond IV had taken possession of the principality. The Knights Templar had aligned themselves with the bourgeoisie of Antioch and the alliance of az-Zahir Ghazi, the Ayyubid sultan of Aleppo, while the Hospitallers sided with Raymond-Roupen and the king of Armenia. The conduct of the Count of Tripoli was severely judged by the Pope who sent his legates without any change. On 5 May 1205, the Holy See sent three new arbitrators without any further success.

When Garin took over the Hospitallers, nothing had changed. Leo I of Armenia had made himself master of Antioch and had re-established his grand-nephew there. But it was of short duration, and as the Count of Tripoli remained master of the city. Leo I supported his claims by confiscating the Templars' property in Cilicia, ruining Antioch's trade by raids, and even risking excommunication in 1210–1213. An agreement was reached between the king and the Templars, and the excommunication was revoked. On 14 February 1216, the treason of the seneschal of Antioch, Acharias, which put Antioch in the hands of Leo I and of his nephew Raymond-Roupen. The guard of the castle of Antioch is entrusted to the commander of Selefkeh, Feraud de Barras. The leader of the Antiochene nobility William Farabel in 1219, allowed the return of Bohémond IV and the escape of Raymon-Roupen, who later died in 1222.

The Count of Tripoli undertook to take revenge on the Hospitallers: he took back the castle of Antioch from them and their possession of the County of Tripoli was undermined. Pope Honorius III interceded in their favor in 1225 and 1226, and his successor Gregory IX excommunicated Bohémond IV in 1230. He authorized Gerald of Lausanne, Latin Patriarch of Jerusalem, to lift the ban if Bohémond agreed to make peace with the Hospitallers. With the mediation of Gerald and the Ibelins, Bohemond and the Hospitallers made a treaty which was signed on 26 October 1231. Bohémond confirmed the Hospitallers' right to hold Jabala and a nearby fortress and granted them money fiefs in both Tripoli and Antioch. The Hospitaller renounced the privileges that Raymond-Roupen had granted to them. Before long, Gerald of Lausanne lifted the excommunication and sent the treaty to Rome to be confirmed by the Holy See.

== Acquisition of territory ==
=== In the Holy Land ===
Throughout this long conflict, the support of the Hospitallers was unwavering and they were rewarded for their loyalty with territorial advantages. Garin received from Raymond-Roupen Gibelacar on 22 May 1207, the castle of Château de la Vieille in September 1210 and an annuity of 200 bezants on the casal of Gédéide in December 1216. In 1210, Selefkeh, Chastel Neuf and Çamardı were given to the Hospitallers who together with Karaman, created a region to the north of Cilicia, where the Hospitallers would able to defend against the Seljuk Sultanate of Rûm. Constantine of Baberon, tutor of Isabella of Armenia, daughter of Leo I, proposed to buy back the commandery of Selefkeh at a high price in order to force Isabella to marry her to his son Héthoum I of Armenia. On learning of this, the commander, the squire Bertrand, preferred to abandon the place. But the abandonment of Selefkeh had no consequences for the rest of the possessions of the order in Cilicia.

In the County of Jaffa, Garin received the lands of Geschale and a sum of 100 bezants, in the County of Edessa, half of the Chastel Rouge, in the county of Tripoli an annuity of 1,000 bezants and another of 2,000 bezants based on the Place of the Cloths in Gibelet, the house of Raymond IV of Tripoli in Laodicea, the castles of Berzaal, of Baqueer, of Quasse, of Bethorafig, of Gabronie and of Maarban. In Cyprus, he obtained from Hugh I of Cyprus an important donation of lands and castles with extensive privileges.

=== In the West ===
The donations of Andrew II of Hungary were driven by the devotion of the Hospitallers. Wichard of Karslberg gave them his land of Engelsdorf in Carinthia in February 1214; Poppo of Wertheim gave Morbach, confirmed in 1218 by his family; they received from Ulrich of Stubenberg on July 18, 1218 the towns of Hatzendorf and Kroisbach in Styria; from Vulvin of Stubenberg, Söchau and Aspach in June 1221; from Count Hugues II of Montfort, the church of Feldkirch, a chapel in the valley of Sainte-Marie and confirmation of goods in Cluse, Brégence and Rinegg in September 1218; from Count Baudouin of Bentheim goods in Esterwege in 1223.

In 1208, the duke of Burgundy Eudes III made a series of donations in memory of his stay in the Holy Land in 1190; Milon de Saint-Florentin gave them land at Villiers-Vineux on June 26, 1220; the count Henri I of Rodez the city of Canet, Frontignan, the Bastide-Pradines, Canabières and Bouloc, on October 18, 1221; the viscount of Béarn Guillaume-Raymond de Moncade the castle of Macied on February 17, 1224; Archambaud IV the house of Buys on June 1225.

== The Fifth Crusade ==
The first wave of troops of the Fifth Crusade, due to the efforts of pope Innocent III, arrived at Acre in the late summer of 1217. Leopold VI of Austria, Hugh I of Cyprus, and Andrew II of Hungary, were brought to Cyprus by Garin at the request of the pope. The king of Jerusalem, John of Brienne, gathered them all together in the presence of the three grand masters of the military orders for a council of war and to determine the course of action to be taken. They attacked the fortress of Mount Tabor, which had to be abandoned, and laid siege to Sidon, which they half-finished. These were the only two actions taken from November to December 1217. The Crusaders returned to Acre and the king of Hungary, giving in to discouragement, returned to Hungary in January 1218.

The arrival of new pilgrims from Friesland and the north of Germany revived the Crusade. Before the winter of 1218, with the help of the Hospitallers, they re-established the fortifications of Caesarea and, with the Templars, the Château Pèlerin. But this was not enough to keep everyone busy, and an expedition to Egypt was decided. The Crusaders, the Latin patriarch of Jerusalem, the prelates of the Holy Land, and the grand masters, were all under the orders of the king of Jerusalem. They embarked at Acre in May to present themselves before Damietta, which they invested in June 1218. During a skirmish against the sultan's camp at Fariskur on 22 August 1219, the Marshal of the Hospitaller, Aymar de Lairon, fell with thirty two of his companions. The city of Damietta was taken in November 1219 and finally the castle of Damietta in January 1220. Placed in a critical position, they negotiated with the Muslims on 30 August 1221 the evacuation of Damietta and the return to Acre. Thus the Fifth Crusade ended in failure.

Andrew II of Hungary was generous to the Hospitallers. He gave the revenues of the tollgate of Bobeth in Sopron, a piece of land between Drave and Csurgó, an annual rent of 500 silver marcs on the saltworks of Szalacs plus another 100 marcs of rent for the Krak des Chevaliers and another 100 marcs for Margat.

== Journeys to the West ==
Emperor Frederick II sent four ships to Acre for King John, Raoul of Merencourt, the Latin patriarch of Jerusalem, the legate Pelagius Galvano and the grand masters of the military orders to confer with him on his promise to go on Crusade. (The Templars were represented by the Grand Preceptor Guillaume Cadel.) They embarked for Brindisi in September 1222 and met with the pope in Rome in January 1223. They had an interview with Frederick II in Ferentino from 17 February to 26 March 1223, where Frederick committed to leave for the Holy Land in 1225. King John and Garin continued their journey to France and England to ask for their help, unfortunately without any effect. Then the two separated, Garin went to Bordeaux on April 15, 1224, to Paris in June, to Orange probably on August 10, to Palermo on December 25 and probably returned to the headquarters of the Order via Armenia since he was in Tarsus in June 1225.

== Later years ==
Garin intervened in Armenia to help the Christian population against Suleiman of Iconium. He helped raise the siege of Acre by the Sultan of Damascus. He distinguished himself at the capture of Damietta during the Fifth Crusade, and subsequently toured European countries seeking support. On his return to Palestine, he found turmoil; he tried vainly to reconcile the Hospitallers with the Templars. In 1228, he persuaded pope Gregory IX to break the truce holding between Christian and Muslim powers, but refused to serve in the army commanded by Frederick II, who was excommunicated. Garin died in Palestine in 1228 and was succeeded by Bertrand de Thessy.

== See also ==
- Cartulaire général de l'Ordre des Hospitaliers
- List of Knights Hospitaller sites
- Langue (Knights Hospitaller)
- Flags of the Knights Hospitaller

== Bibliography ==
- Barber, Malcolm (2012). The New Knighthood. A History of the Order of the Temple. Cambridge University Press. ISBN 978-1107604735.
- Bronstein, Judith (2005). The Hospitallers and the Holy Land: Financing the Latin East, 1187-1274. Boydell Press. ISBN 9781843831310.
- Delaville Le Roulx, Joseph (1904). Les Hospitaliers en Terre Sainte et à Chypre (1100-1310). E. Leroux, Paris.
- Demurger, Alain (2013). Les Hospitaliers, De Jérusalem à Rhodes 1050-1317. Tallandier, Paris. ISBN 979-1021000605.
- Flavigny, Bertrand Galimard (2006). Histoire de l'ordre de Malte. Perrin, Paris. ISBN 978-2262021153.
- Harot, Eugène (1911). Essai d'armorial des grands maîtres de l'Ordre de Saint-Jean de Jérusalem. Collegio araldico.
- Josserand, Philippe (2009). Prier et combattre, Dictionnaire européen des ordres militaires au Moyen Âge. Fayard, Paris. ISBN 978-2213627205.
- Lock, Peter (2006). The Routledge Companion to the Crusades. Routledge. doi:10.4324/9780203389638. ISBN 0-415-39312-4.
- Murray, Alan V. (2006). The Crusades—An Encyclopedia. ABC-CLIO. ISBN 978-1-57607-862-4.
- Nicholson, Helen J. (2001). The Knights Hospitaller. Boydell & Brewer. ISBN 978-1843830382.
- Runciman, Steven (1954). A History of the Crusades, Volume Three: The Kingdom of Acre and the Later Crusades. Cambridge University Press. ISBN 9780521347723.
- Setton, Kenneth M. (1969). A History of the Crusades. University of Wisconsin Press.
- Tyerman, Christopher (2006). God's War: A New History of the Crusades. Belknap Press. ISBN 978-0-674-02387-1.
- Vann, Theresa M. (2006). Order of the Hospital. The Crusades––An Encyclopedia, pp. 598–605.

Preceded by Geoffroy le Rat	Grand Master of the Knights Hospitaller; 1207–1228	Succeeded by Bertrand de Thessy
