= Bertrand de Comps =

Bertrand de Comps (died 1239 or 1240) was the seventeenth Grand Master of the Knights Hospitaller from 1236 until his death after 1239. He succeeded Guérin Lebrun as Grand Master, and was succeeded by Pierre de Vieille-Brioude.

== Biography ==
De Comps appears for the first time in the archives of the order as a simple brother and dates from February 1216 in the Holy Land. He still appears as prior of Saint-Gilles from 8 December 1231 to 17 April 1234. He had to take office in 1230 or 1231, since his predecessor, G. des Ormes, was still prior of Saint-Gilles in 1229. Between April 1234 and the summer of 1236, there is no documentation concerning him, but he was perhaps directly from the priory to the magisterium.

He was elected between May and September 1236, and was to hold his post of Grand Master at least until April 1239, when he was last mentioned, perhaps later, since the first mention of his successor Pierre de Vieille-Brioude dates from 1240.

== Under his magisterium ==
Peace, assured until 1237, is not very clear as to the maneuvers of the Hospitallers. They seem at least twice to have thought of negotiating an alliance with the enemies of the Franks of the Holy Land, the Ayyubids. Pope Gregory IX accused them of wanting to come to an understanding with the Assassins against Bohemond V of Antioch with whom they were in open hostilities. He reproached them for paying tribute in exchange for their protection.

Gregory IX formulated the threat of excommunication towards the Hospitallers and the Templars on 29 April 1236. On 13 March 1238, he formulated a new accusation against the Hospitallers, accusing them of a scandalous life and lax discipline. He accused them of supporting John III Doukas Vatatzes, son-in-law of Théodore Lascaris, proclaimed emperor of Nicaea, by threatening the faltering domination of the emperors of Constantinople.

== See also ==
- Cartulaire général de l'Ordre des Hospitaliers
- List of Knights Hospitaller sites
- Langue (Knights Hospitaller)
- Flags of the Knights Hospitaller

== Bibliography ==
- Bronstein, Judith (2005). The Hospitallers and the Holy Land: Financing the Latin East, 1187-1274. Boydell Press. ISBN 9781843831310.
- Delaville Le Roulx, Joseph (1904). Les Hospitaliers en Terre Sainte et à Chypre (1100-1310). E. Leroux, Paris.
- Demurger, Alain (2013). Les Hospitaliers, De Jérusalem à Rhodes 1050-1317. Tallandier, Paris. ISBN 979-1021000605.
- Flavigny, Bertrand Galimard (2006). Histoire de l'ordre de Malte. Perrin, Paris. ISBN 978-2262021153.
- Hardwicke, Mary Nickerson (1969). The Crusader States, 1192–1243 (PDF). A History of the Crusades (Setton), Volume II. Archived from the original (PDF) on 2024-03-28.
- Harot, Eugène (1911). Essai d'armorial des grands maîtres de l'Ordre de Saint-Jean de Jérusalem. Collegio araldico.
- Josserand, Philippe (2009). Prier et combattre, Dictionnaire européen des ordres militaires au Moyen Âge. Fayard, Paris. ISBN 978-2213627205.
- Murray, Alan V. (2006). The Crusades—An Encyclopedia. ABC-CLIO. ISBN 978-1-57607-862-4. Archived from the original on 2023-03-26.
- Nicholson, Helen J. (2001). The Knights Hospitaller. Boydell & Brewer. ISBN 978-1843830382.
- Runciman, Steven (1954). A History of the Crusades, Volume Three: The Kingdom of Acre and the Later Crusades. Cambridge University Press. ISBN 978-0521347723.
- Setton, Kenneth M. (1969). A History of the Crusades. Six Volumes. University of Wisconsin Press.
- Vann, Theresa M. (2006). Order of the Hospital. The Crusades––An Encyclopedia, pp. 598–605.

Preceded by Guérin Lebrun	Grand Master of the Knights Hospitaller; 1236–1240	Succeeded by Pierre de Vieille-Brioude
