= Geoffroy le Rat =

Grand Master of the Knights Hospitaller

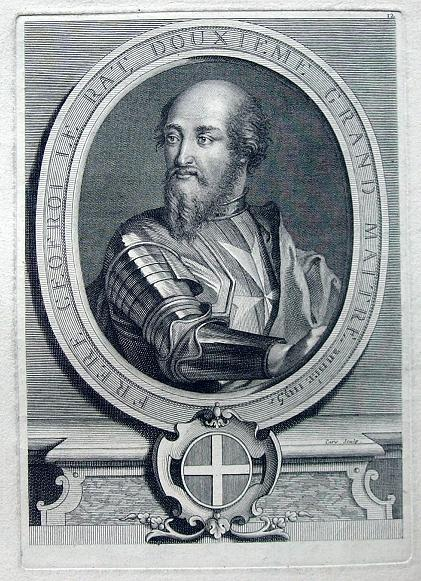
Copper engraving portrait of Geoffroy le Rat by Laurent Cars circa. 1725

Geoffroy le Rat (died 1207) was the thirteenth grand master of the Knights Hospitaller, serving between 1206–1207. He succeeded the Grand Master Fernando Afonso after his resignation in 1206, and was succeeded by Guérin de Montaigu.

== Biography ==
Geoffroy le Rat did not occupy the position of Grand Master until mid–1206 and the beginning of the second half of 1207. He was of French origin, attached to a family of Touraine.

He had been a commander in the Principality of Antioch and lord of the Krak des Chevaliers before being elected as master.

As the Fourth Crusade was diverted to Constantinople, the Hospitallers did not have a military role at the beginning of the thirteenth century.

== See also ==
- Cartulaire général de l'Ordre des Hospitaliers
- List of Knights Hospitaller sites
- Langue (Knights Hospitaller)
- Flags of the Knights Hospitaller

== Bibliography ==
- Delaville Le Roulx, Joseph (1904). Les Hospitaliers en Terre Sainte et à Chypre (1100-1310). E. Leroux, Paris.
- Demurger, Alain (2013). Les Hospitaliers, De Jérusalem à Rhodes 1050-1317. Tallandier, Paris. ISBN 979-1021000605.
- Flavigny, Bertrand Galimard (2006). Histoire de l'ordre de Malte. Perrin, Paris. ISBN 978-2262021153.
- Harot, Eugène (1911). Essai d'armorial des grands maîtres de l'Ordre de Saint-Jean de Jérusalem. Collegio araldico.
- Josserand, Philippe (2009). Prier et combattre, Dictionnaire européen des ordres militaires au Moyen Âge. Fayard, Paris. ISBN 978-2213627205.
- Lock, Peter (2006). The Routledge Companion to the Crusades. Routledge. doi:10.4324/9780203389638. ISBN 0-415-39312-4.
- Murray, Alan V. (2006). The Crusades—An Encyclopedia. ABC-CLIO. ISBN 978-1-57607-862-4.
- Nicholson, Helen J. (2001). The Knights Hospitaller. Boydell & Brewer. ISBN 978-1843830382.
- Runciman, Steven (1954). A History of the Crusades, Volume Three: The Kingdom of Acre and the Later Crusades. Cambridge University Press. ISBN 9780521347723.
- Setton, Kenneth M. (1969). A History of the Crusades. University of Wisconsin Press.
- Tyerman, Christopher (2006). God's War: A New History of the Crusades. Belknap Press. ISBN 978-0-674-02387-1.
- Vann, Theresa M. (2006). Order of the Hospital. The Crusades––An Encyclopedia, pp. 598–605.

| Preceded by Fernando Afonso of Portugal | Grand Master of the Knights Hospitaller; 1206–1207 | Succeeded by Guérin de Montaigu |
