= Hospitaller Rhodes =

Sovereign territorial entity of the Knights Hospitaller from 1310 to 1522

Hospitaller Rhodes Ordo Hospitalis Sancti Ioannis in Rhodo (Latin)
- 1310–1522
- Flag Coat of arms

- Rhodes and other possessions of the Knights Hospitallers of St. John.
- Capital: Rhodes
- Common languages: Latin (official); Greek (spoken by the population); Also spoken: Italian, Catalan, French.
- Religion: Roman Catholicism
- Government: Elective monarchy
- Grand Master
  - 1310–1319: Foulques de Villaret (first)
  - 1521–1522: Philippe Villiers de L'Isle-Adam (last)
- Historical era: Late Middle Ages
  - Hospitaller conquest of Rhodes: August 15, 1310
  - Ottoman conquest: December 22, 1522
Preceded by	Succeeded by
Byzantine Rhodes (Palaiologos dynasty); Mentese Beylik	Ottoman Rhodes
- Today part of: Greece

The history of Rhodes under the Order of Saint John lasted from 1310 until 1522. The island of Rhodes was a sovereign territorial entity of the Knights Hospitaller who settled on the island from Kingdom of Jerusalem and from Cyprus, where they did not exercise temporal power. The first Grand Master was the Frenchman Foulques de Villaret (1305–1319).

== History ==
After the extinction of the Kingdom of Jerusalem with the fall of Acre in 1291, the order sought refuge in the Kingdom of Cyprus. Finding themselves becoming enmeshed in Cypriot politics, their Master, Guillaume de Villaret, created a plan of acquiring their own temporal domain, selecting Rhodes to be their new home, part of the Byzantine Empire.

Due to repeated disagreements with the king of Cyprus Henry II, which left the privileges of the Knights Hospitaller unaltered, Foulques de Villaret made the decision to transfer the Order to the nearby island of Rhodes which was under the formal authority of the Byzantine emperor Andronikos II Palaiologos. He then went to Avignon and Paris to ask for help and consent from Pope Clement V and King Philip IV of France. The pontiff approved the project and, without revealing the end of the mission, ordered the sending of new crusaders and in September 1308 a fleet of Genoese and Neapolitan ships set sail from Brindisi. The emperor had rejected the homage proposal made by Villaret and sent reinforcements to defend the island. The Knights repulsed them. On 15 August 1310, after over four years of campaigning, the city of Rhodes surrendered to the knights. They also gained control of a number of neighbouring islands and the Anatolian port of Halicarnassus and the island of Kastellorizo.

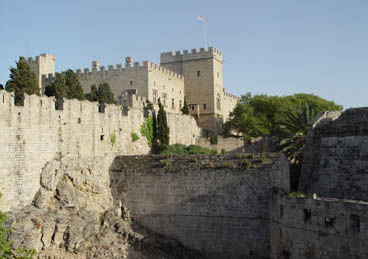
The Knights' castle at Rhodes

At Rhodes, the resident knights of each langue were headed by a baili. The English Grand Prior at the time was Philip De Thame, who acquired the estates allocated to the English langue from 1330 to 1358. In 1334, the Knights of Rhodes defeated Andronikos III Palaiologos and his Turkish auxiliaries. In the 14th century, there were several other battles in which they fought.

In 1374, the Knights took over the defence of Smyrna, conquered by a crusade in 1344. They held it until it was besieged and taken by Timur in 1402.

On Rhodes the Hospitallers were forced to become a more militarised force, fighting especially with the Barbary pirates. They withstood two invasions in the 15th century, one by the Mamluk Sultan of Egypt Sayf ad-Din Jaqmaq in 1444 and another by the Ottoman Sultan Mehmed the Conqueror in 1480 who, after capturing Constantinople and defeating the Byzantine Empire in 1453, made the Knights a priority target.

In 1402, they created a stronghold on the peninsula of Halicarnassus (present Bodrum). They used pieces of the partially destroyed Mausoleum at Halicarnassus, one of the Seven Wonders of the Ancient World, to strengthen their rampart, the Petronium.

In 1522, an entirely new sort of force arrived: 400 ships under the command of Sultan Suleiman the Magnificent delivered 100,000 men to the island (200,000 in other sources). Against this force the Knights, under Grand Master Philippe Villiers de L'Isle-Adam, had about 7,000 men-at-arms and their fortifications. The siege lasted six months, at the end of which the surviving defeated Hospitallers were allowed to withdraw to Sicily. Despite the defeat, both Christians and Muslims seem to have regarded the conduct of Philippe Villiers de L'Isle-Adam as extremely valiant, and the Grand Master was proclaimed a Defender of the Faith by Pope Adrian VI.

== Gallery ==
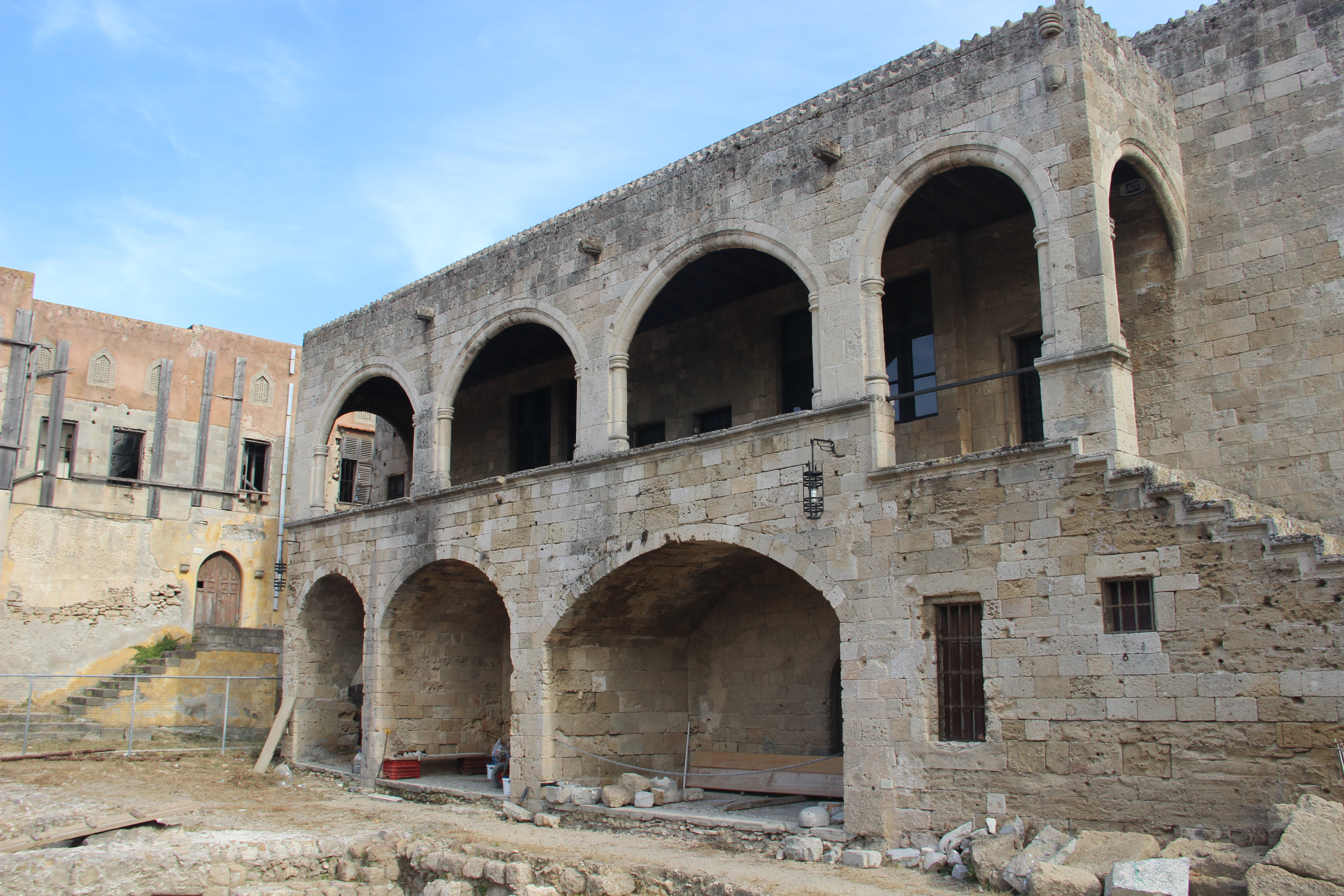
Inn of Auvergne

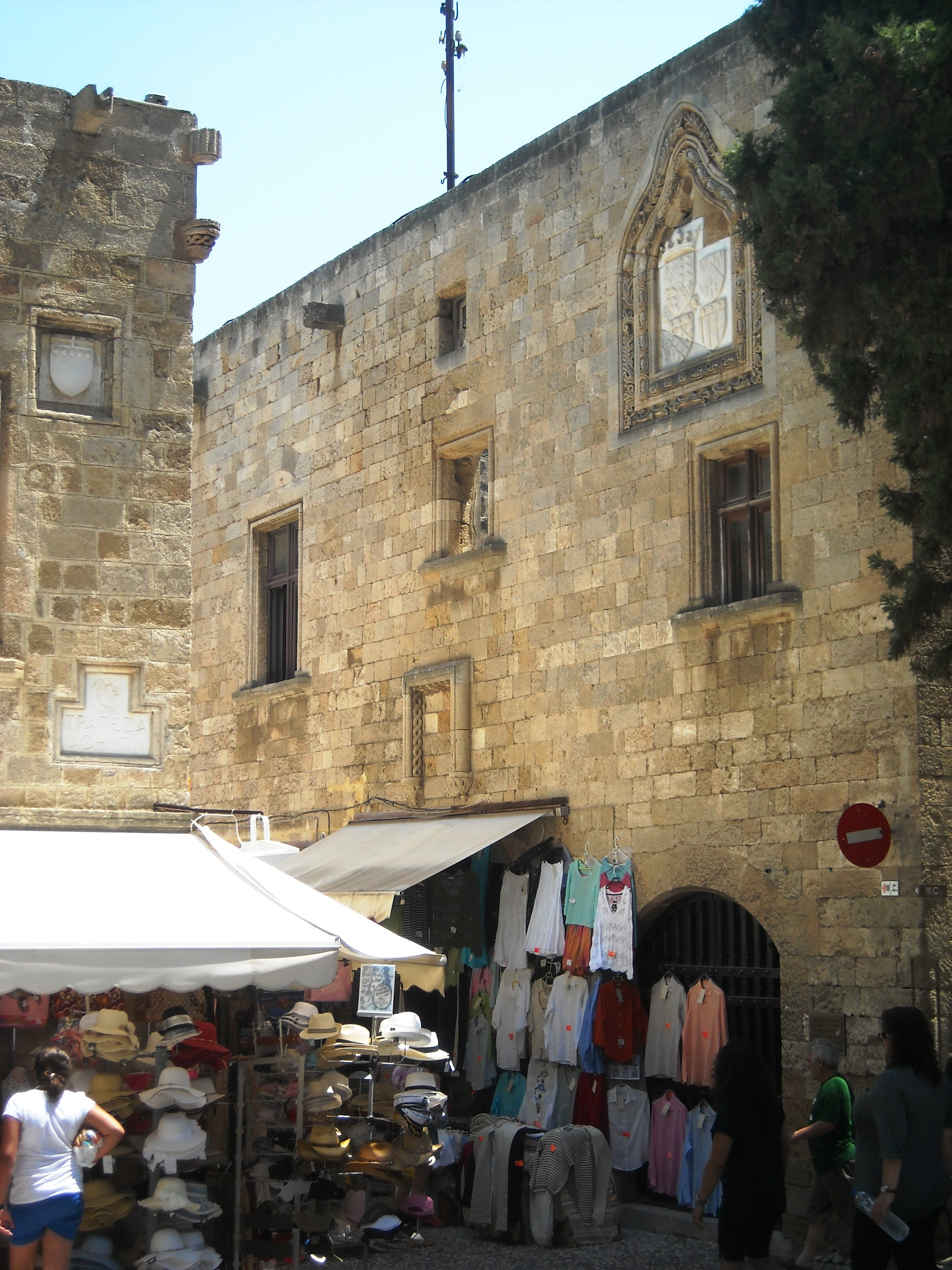
Inn of England

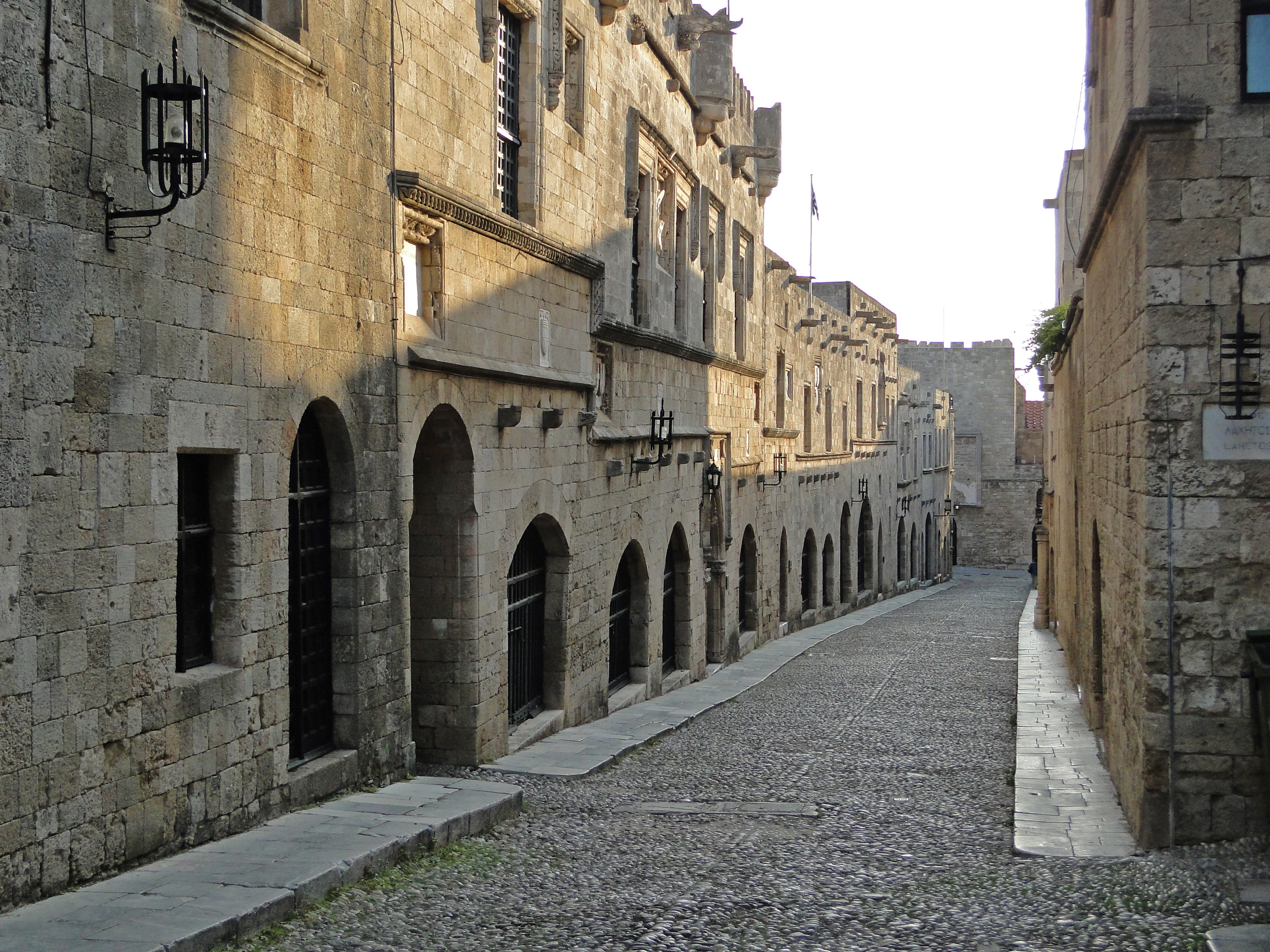
Inn of France on the Street of the Knights

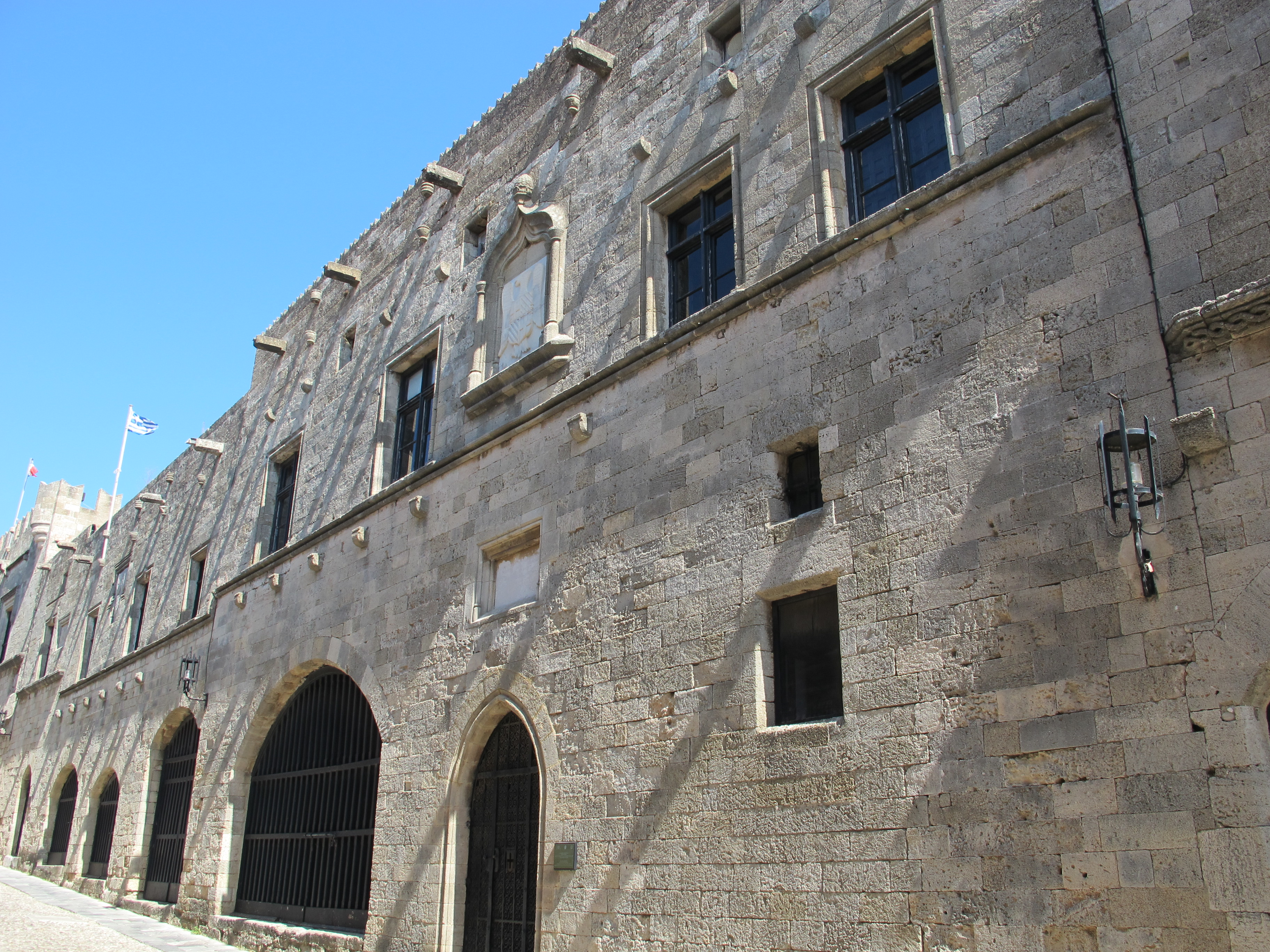
Inn of Italy

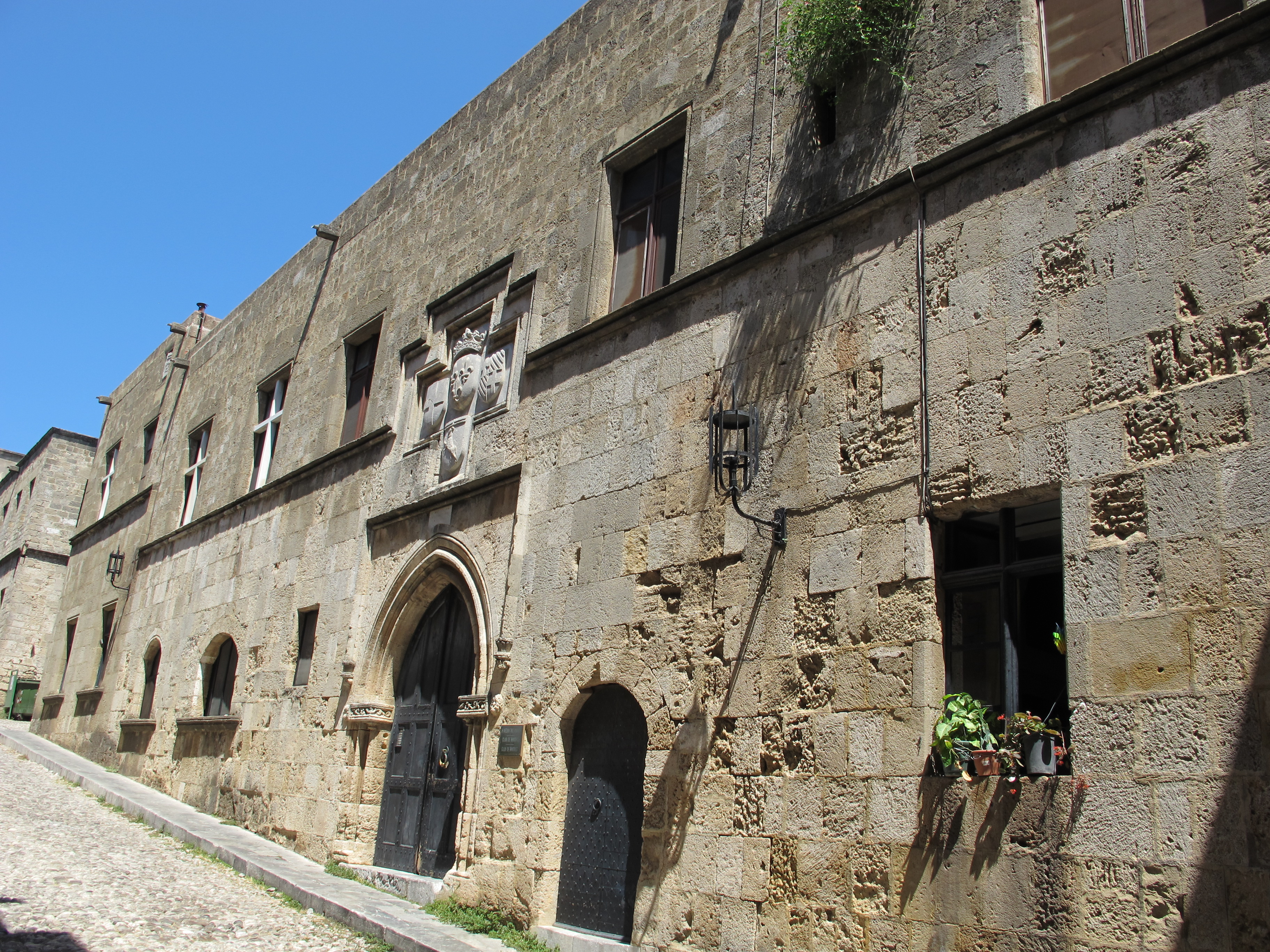
Inn of Provence

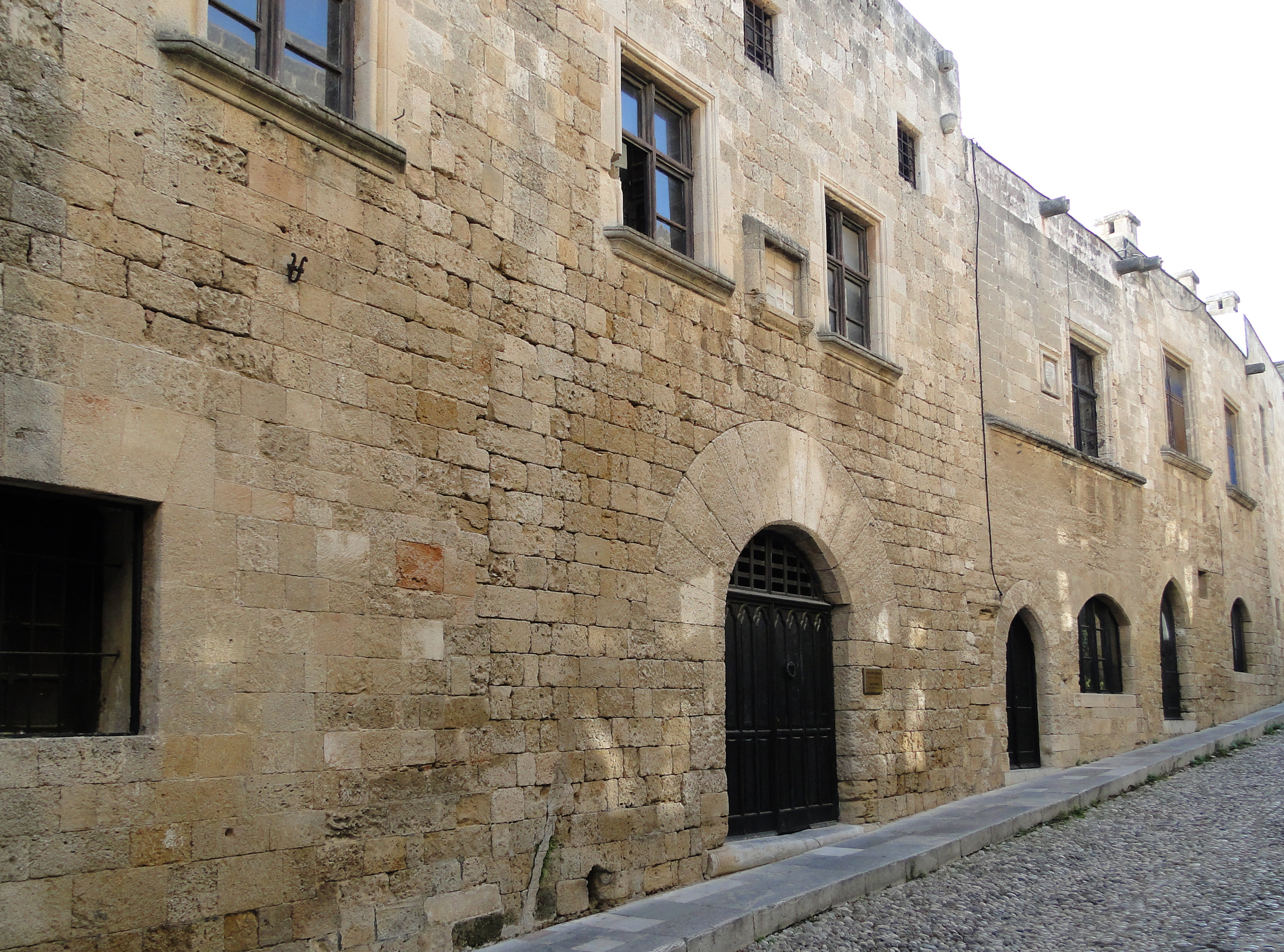
Inn of Spain

== See also ==
- Hospitaller Malta
- List of Knights Hospitaller sites

== Bibliography ==
- Alessio Varisco Fides et Caritas. Il Beato Gherardo de' Saxo e i 900 anni dell'Ordine di San Giovanni di Gerusalemme di Rodi e di Malta (con catalogo delle decorazioni e gradi del Sovrano Militare Ordine di Malta e dell'Ordine pro Merito Melitensi civile e militare), Arcidosso, Effigi, 2013
- Franco Baglioni, I cavalieri di Rodi, SEI, Torino 1954.
- Eric Brockman, The Two Sieges of Rhodes: The Knights of St John at War 1480-1522, Barnes & Noble 1995.
- Giulio Jacopi, Lo Spedale dei Cavalieri e il Museo Archeologico di Rodi, La Libreria dello Stato, Roma 1932.
- Elias Kollias, I Cavalieri di Rodi. Il palazzo e la città, Ekdotike Athenon S.A., Atene 1991.
- Luttrell, Anthony (1975). "The Hospitallers at Rhodes, 1306–1421". In Setton, Kenneth M.; Hazard, Harry W. (eds.). A History of the Crusades, Volume III: The Fourteenth and Fifteenth Centuries. Vol. 3. Madison and London: University of Wisconsin Press. pp. 278–313. ISBN 0-299-06670-3.
- Luttrell, Anthony (1988). "The Hospitallers of Rhodes Confront the Turks, 1306–1421". In Gallagher, P. F. (ed.). Christians, Jews, and Other Worlds: Patterns of Conflict and Accommodation. New York and London: University Press of America. pp. 80–116.
- Anthony Lutrell, The town of Rhodes 1306-1356, Rodi 2003.
- Vassilia Petzsa-Tzounakou, Rodi la città dei Cavalieri, Bonechi, Firenze 1996.
- Jean-Christian Poutiers, Rhodes et ses chevaliers, ESTC, Araya 1989.
- Stephen C Spiteri, Fortresses of the Knights, Book Distributors Ltd, 2001
- Carlo Trionfi, Il segno degli eroi. Storia dell'assedio di Rodi, Ceschina, Milano 1933.
- Paulette Tsimbouki, Rodi l'isola dei fiori, Leonti, Pireo 1963.
