= List of grand masters of the Knights Hospitaller =

Coat of arms of the Order of Saint John. The personal coat of arms of the grand master would be shown alongside the order's coat of arms in 14th to 15th centuries. Beginning in the mid-15th century, the grand master would quarter the order's coat of arms with his own.

This is a list of grand masters of the Knights Hospitaller, including its continuation as the Sovereign Military Order of Malta after 1798. It also includes unrecognized "anti-grand masters" and lieutenants or stewards during vacancies.

In lists of the heads of the Order, the title "grand master" is often applied retrospectively to the early heads of the Order. The medieval heads of the Order used the title of custos (guardian) of the hospital. The title magister (master) is used on coins minted in Rhodes, beginning with Foulques de Villaret. The first to use the title grandis magister (grand master) was Jean de Lastic (reigned 1437–1454). Later grand masters in Rhodes used magnus magister (grand master).

In 1607 Holy Roman Emperor Rudolf II created the grand master a prince of the Holy Roman Empire (Reichsfürst). This grant was renewed by Emperor Ferdinand II on July 16, 1620. On March 20, 1607, Pope Paul V granted the grand master the style of His Eminence and precedence at the Court of Rome immediately after the cardinals.

In 1880 the title of Fürst (prince) was recognised in Austria by the Emperor Franz Joseph I.

On February 2, 1929, the title of principe (prince) and the style of Altezza Eminentissima (Most Eminent Highness) were recognised in Italy by King Victor Emmanuel III.

The style currently used by the grand master is:

English: Most Eminent Highness,
Italian: Altezza Eminentissima,
French: Altesse Eminentissime,
German: Hoheit und Eminenz,
Spanish: Alteza Eminentísima.

Numbered lists of the heads of the Order were published beginning in the early 17th century, with updated editions appearing throughout the 18th century. The numbering of masters and grand masters published in the 1719 Statutes of the Order lists Blessed Gerard as founder without number, Raymond du Puy as 1st Master, and Ramón Perellós (the incumbent as of 1719) as 63rd grand master. The numbering currently used by the Sovereign Military Order of Malta lists Blessed Gerard as 1st master, Raymond du Puy as 2nd master, Ramón Perellós y Rocafull as 64th grand master, and Giacomo Dalla Torre del Tempio di Sanguinetto as 80th grand master.

== Knights Hospitaller (1099–1310) ==
No.	Title	Name	Tenure	Notes
1	Founder and Rector	Gerardo Sasso	1099/1113–1118/20	Order established in 1099 and given papal recognition by Pope Paschal II in his bull Pie postulatio voluntatis in 1113.
2	Guardian	Raymond du Puy	1118/20–1158/60	Succeeded Gerardo Sasso after Pierre de Barcelona and Boyant Roger served in ad interim capacity. Began the use of the Hospitallers as a military force in the Holy Land and codified rules of conduct for the Order. Introduced the Order's Great Seal.
3	Guardian	Auger de Balben	1158/60–1162/63	
4	Guardian	Arnaud de Comps	c. 1162–1163	Historicity uncertain. Arnaud de Comps is today considered by some as a master who never existed, his name having appeared in the chronological lists placed at the top of the statutes, but his rank is still maintained in the lists of the grand masters.
5	Guardian	Gilbert of Assailly	1163–1169	Supported Amalric of Jerusalem in the Crusader invasions of Egypt.
6	Guardian	Gastone de Murols	c. 1170–1172	
7	Guardian	Jobert of Syria	c. 1172–1177	Acted as regent for king Amalric of Jerusalem in 1172. In 1174, opposed Miles of Plancy in favour of Raymond III of Tripoli.
8	Guardian	Roger de Moulins	1177–1187	Killed at the Battle of Cresson. Commander William Borrel was appointed grand master ad interim, and he was killed at the Battle of Hattin, 3 months later.
9	Provisor	Armengol de Aspa	1187–1190	Grand master ad interim during the loss of Jerusalem in 1187, headquarters moved to Acre. Included in the canonical list of grand masters compiled in the early modern period. After the capture of Acre and the consolidation of the order, Armengol abdicated, and Garnier de Nablus elected as grand master.
10	Guardian	Garnier de Nablus	1190–1192	Supported Richard I of England in the Third Crusade.
11	Guardian	Geoffroy de Donjon	1193–1202	After his death, succeeded by Pierre de Mirmande as grand master ad interim.
12	Guardian	Afonso de Portugal	1202–1206	Resigned in 1206.
13	Guardian	Geoffroy le Rat	1206–1207	First structured the Order by nationality, or langues.
14	Guardian	Guérin de Montaigu	1207–1228	Fifth Crusade.
15	Guardian	Bertrand de Thessy	1228–1231	Sixth Crusade.
16	Guardian	Guérin Lebrun	1231–1236	Conflict with Bohemond IV of Antioch.
17	Guardian	Bertrand de Comps	1236–1240	Barons' Crusade. Headquarters moved to Jerusalem.
18	Guardian	Pierre de Vieille-Brioude	1240–1242	Battle of Gaza. Conflict with the Templars.
19	Guardian	Guillaume de Chateauneuf	1242–1258	Fall of Jerusalem in 1244. Headquarters moved to Acre, Krak des Chevaliers, and Margat. Captured at La Forbie in 1244. Jean de Ronay served as grand master ad interim, dying in 1250 at Mansurah. De Chateauneuf was released by the Ayyubids on 17 October 1250.
20	Guardian	Hugues de Revel	1258–1277	Loss of Krak des Chevaliers in 1271.
21	Guardian	Nicolas Lorgne	1277–1285	Loss of Margat in 1285. Upon his death, Grand Commander Jacques de Taxi served as grand master ad interim until his successor Jean de Villiers arrived in the Holy Land.
22	Guardian	Jean de Villiers	1285–1294	Siege of Acre.
23	Guardian	Odon de Pins	1294–1296	Headquarters moved to Limisso, Cyprus.
24	Guardian	Guillaume de Villaret	1296–1305	
25	Guardian	Foulques de Villaret	1305–1310	Nephew of Guillaume de Villaret. Headquarters moved to Rhodes in 1310.

== Knights of Rhodes (1310–1530) ==
No.	Title	Picture	Name	Tenure	Notes
25	Master		Foulques de Villaret	1310–1319	Headquarters moved from Cyprus in 1310. Resigned at request of Pope John XXII in 1319. Died in 1327.
	Anti-Master		Maurice de Pagnac	1317–1319	
26	Master		Hélion de Villeneuve	1319–1346	
27	Master		Dieudonné de Gozon	1346–1353	
28	Master		Pierre de Corneillan	1353–1355	
29	Master		Roger de Pins	1355–1365	
30	Master		Raymond Berengar	1365–1374	
31	Master		Robert de Juilly (de Juliac)	1374–1376	
32	Master		Juan Fernández de Heredia	1376–1396	Appointed by Pope Gregory XI. Later supported Antipope Clement VII. Deposed by Pope Urban VI in 1382. Continued as Anti-Master at Rhodes until his death.
33	Master		Riccardo Caracciolo	1383–1395	Appointed by Pope Urban VI in 1382.
34	Master		Philibert de Naillac	1396–1421	
35	Master		Anton Flavian de Ripa	1421–1437	
36	Grand Master		Jean de Lastic	1437–1454	Siege of Rhodes (1444). First use of the title "Grand Master" (Grandis Magister).
37	Grand Master		Jacques de Milly	1454–1461	
38	Grand Master		Piero Raimondo Zacosta	1461–1467	
39	Grand Master		Giovanni Battista Orsini	1467–1476	
40	Grand Master		Pierre d'Aubusson	1476–1503	Siege of Rhodes (1480)
41	Grand Master		Emery d'Amboise	1503–1512	
42	Grand Master		Guy de Blanchefort	1512–1513	
43	Grand Master		Fabrizio del Carretto	1513–1521	
44	Grand Master		Philippe Villiers de L'Isle‑Adam	1521–1530	Siege of Rhodes (1522). Headquarters moved to Malta in 1530.

== Knights of Malta (1530–1799) ==
No.	Title	Picture	Name	Tenure	Notes
44	Grand Master		Philippe Villiers de L'Isle-Adam	1530–1534	Headquarters moved from Rhodes in 1530.
45	Grand Master		Piero de Ponte	1534–1535	
46	Grand Master		Didier de Saint-Jaille	1535–1536	
47	Grand Master		Juan de Homedes	1536–1553	Malta was attacked by an Ottoman fleet in 1551. The attack was repelled, but the Ottomans captured the island of Gozo, and later also the Order's stronghold in Tripoli. De Homedes began a program to improve the fortifications at Malta.
48	Grand Master		Claude de la Sengle	1553–1557	Continued the improvement of fortifications, expanding Fort Saint Michael into a major bastion and completing Fort Saint Elmo.
49	Grand Master		Jean Parisot de Valette	1557–1568	Most illustrious leader of the Order, commanding the resistance against the Ottomans at the Great Siege of Malta in 1565. Commissioned the construction of a new capital, Valletta.
50	Grand Master		Pierre de Monte	1568–1572	Continued the construction of the new capital, Valletta. Strengthened the Order's fleet and participated in the Battle of Lepanto of 7 October 1571.
51	Grand Master		Jean de la Cassière	1572–1581	Crisis in the wake of the Protestant Reformation. Expulsion of the Order's Bailiwick of Brandenburg in 1581.
	Lieutenant		Mathurin Romegas	1577–1581	
	Anti-Grand Master		Mathurin Romegas	1581	
52	Grand Master		Hugues Loubenx de Verdalle	1581–1595	
53	Grand Master		Martín Garzés	1595–1601	
54	Prince and Grand Master		Alof de Wignacourt	1601–1622	Constructed the Wignacourt towers and the Wignacourt Aqueduct. Repelled the last serious Ottoman attempt at capturing Malta in 1614.
55	Prince and Grand Master		Luís Mendes de Vasconcellos	1622–1623	
56	Prince and Grand Master		Antoine de Paule	1623–1636	
57	Prince and Grand Master		Giovanni Paolo Lascaris	1636–1657	Hospitaller colonization of the Americas.
58	Prince and Grand Master		Martin de Redin	1657–1660	
59	Prince and Grand Master		Annet de Clermont-Gessant	1660	Died on 2 June 1660, less than four months after his election.
60	Prince and Grand Master		Rafael Cotoner	1660–1663	Commissioned the Italian Baroque artist Mattia Preti to start painting St John's Co-Cathedral in Valletta.
61	Prince and Grand Master		Nicolás Cotoner	1663–1680	Siege of Candia. Mattia Preti's work at St John's Co-Cathedral completed.
62	Prince and Grand Master		Gregorio Carafa	1680–1690	Renovation of Auberge d'Italie in the Baroque style. Improvement of Fort Saint Angelo and Fort Saint Elmo. Ottoman attacks were still expected, but there were no longer any notable engagements.
63	Prince and Grand Master		Adrien de Wignacourt	1690–1697	Instituted a widows pension for the widows of those fallen in the Ottoman wars.
64	Prince and Grand Master		Ramon Perellós	1697–1720	Organised the Consulato del Mare (Consulate of the Sea). Established relations with imperial Russia. Fought corruption within the Order. Engagement against Ottoman pirates.
65	Prince and Grand Master		Marc'Antonio Zondadari	1720–1722	
66	Prince and Grand Master		António Manoel de Vilhena	1722–1736	Restored the city Mdina, constructed Fort Manoel, and significantly improved the fortifications of Malta in general. Built Casa Leoni and Palazzo Parisio, and renovated Verdala Palace. Manoel Theatre (1731). Conducted peace negotiations with the Ottomans, without result. Declared neutrality in the War of the Polish Succession.
67	Prince and Grand Master		Ramón Despuig	1736–1741	Improved the fortifications of Mdina, modernised legislation, and renovated the Co-Cathedral of St. John. Naval engagements with Ottoman Algeria.
68	Prince and Grand Master		Manuel Pinto da Fonseca	1741–1773	Expelled the Jesuits from Malta. Proclaimed the sovereignty of the Order on Malta in 1753 and started a dispute with the Kingdom of Sicily under King Charles V. Normal relations were resumed the next year, with the Order retaining de facto control over Malta as a sovereign state.
69	Prince and Grand Master		Francisco Ximénez de Tejada	1773–1775	Rising of the Priests (1775). Bankruptcy of the Order.
70	Prince and Grand Master		Emmanuel de Rohan-Polduc	1775–1797	Instituted the Anglo-Bavarian langue and the Russian Grand Priory.
71	Prince and Grand Master		Ferdinand von Hompesch zu Bolheim	1797–1799	First German elected to the office. Abdicated on 6 July 1799 following the French invasion of Malta.

== Sovereign Military Order of Malta (since 1798) ==
Prince and Grand Master of Sovereign Military Order of Malta
- Coat of arms

- Flag of the Grand Master

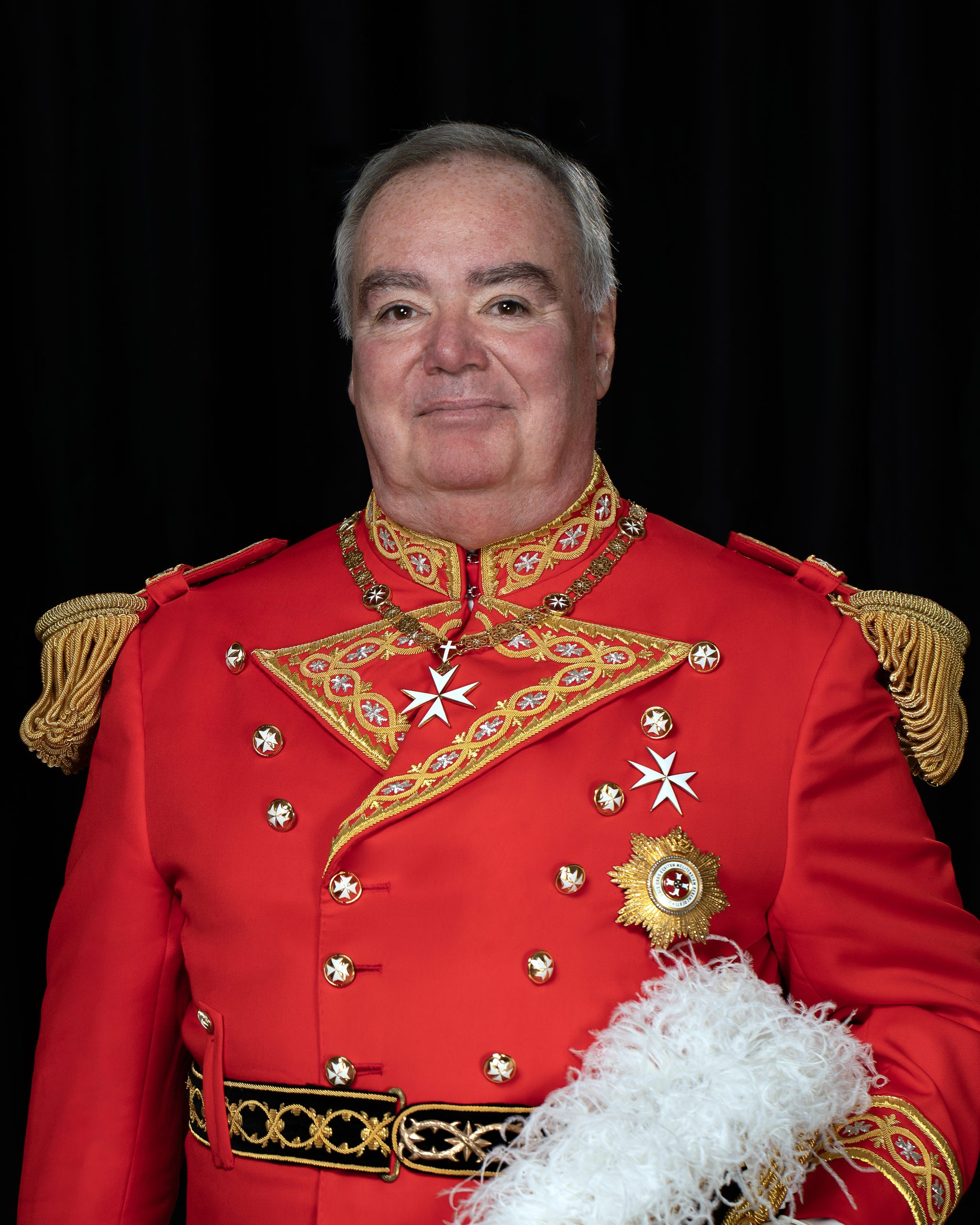
- Incumbent; John T. Dunlap; Prince and Grand Master since 13 June 2022
- Style: His Most Eminent Highness
- Member of: Sovereign Council of the Order of Malta
- Appointer: Council Complete of State
- Term length: Ten years
- Constituting instrument: Constitutional Charter and Code
- Formation: 1099
- First holder: Blessed Gerard

No.	Title	Picture	Name	Tenure	Notes
72	Grand Master de facto		Pavel I Petrovich	1798–1801	Elected by the Priory of St. Petersburg in September 1798 (before the abdication of von Hompesch). Election not confirmed by Pope Pius VII.
	Lieutenant de facto		Nikolai Saltykov	1801–1803	De facto Lieutenant in Saint Petersburg.
73	Prince and Grand Master		Giovanni Battista Tommasi	1803–1805	Appointed by Pope Pius VII. Headquarters in Messina and Catania.
	Lieutenant		Innico Maria Guevara-Suardo	1805–1814	Headquarters in Catania.
	Lieutenant		Andrea Di Giovanni y Centellés	1814–1821	Headquarters in Catania.
	Lieutenant		Antoine Busca	1821–1834	Headquarters in Ferrara.
	Lieutenant		Carlo Candida	1834–1845	Headquarters moved to Palazzo Malta, Rome.
	Lieutenant		Filippo di Colloredo-Mels	1845–1864	
	Lieutenant		Alessandro Borgia	1865–1871	
	Lieutenant		Giovanni Battista Ceschi a Santa Croce	1871–1879	
74	Prince and Grand Master		Giovanni Battista Ceschi a Santa Croce	1879–1905	Restoration of the office of Grand Master after a 75-year interregnum. Confirmed by Pope Leo XIII.
75	Prince and Grand Master		Galeas von Thun und Hohenstein	1905–1931	
76	Prince and Grand Master		Ludovico Chigi Albani della Rovere	1931–1951	
	Lieutenant		Antonio Hercolani Fava Simonetti	1951–1955	
	Lieutenant		Ernesto Paternò Castello di Carcaci	1955–1962	Constitutional Charter approved by Apostolic Letter of Pope John XXIII, 24 June 1961.
77	Prince and Grand Master		Angelo de Mojana di Cologna	1962–1988	
	Lieutenant ad interim		Jean Charles Pallavicini	1988	
78	Prince and Grand Master		Andrew Bertie	1988–2008	Constitutional Charter and Code revised by the Extraordinary Chapter General 28–30 April 1997.
	Lieutenant ad interim		Giacomo dalla Torre del Tempio di Sanguinetto	2008	
79	Prince and Grand Master		Matthew Festing	2008–2017	First Grand Master elected under the new constitution of 1997. Resigned in 2017.
	Lieutenant ad interim		Ludwig Hoffmann-Rumerstein	2017	
	Lieutenant of the Grand Master		Giacomo dalla Torre del Tempio di Sanguinetto	2017–2018	
80	Prince and Grand Master		Giacomo dalla Torre del Tempio di Sanguinetto	2018–2020	
	Lieutenant ad interim		Ruy Villas-Boas	2020	
	Lieutenant of the Grand Master		Marco Luzzago	2020–2022	
	Lieutenant ad interim		Ruy Villas-Boas	2022	
	Lieutenant of the Grand Master		John Timothy Dunlap	2022–2023	
81	Prince and Grand Master		John Timothy Dunlap	2023–present	First Grand Master following the 2022 revision of the Order's constitution.

== See also ==
- Grand master (order)
- Order of Saint John (Bailiwick of Brandenburg)#Herrenmeister
- Grand Masters and Lieutenancies of the Order of the Holy Sepulchre
- Grand Master of the Teutonic Order
- Grand Master of the Order of Saint Lazarus
- List of grand masters of the Knights Templar
- List of heads of state of Malta
