= Jean Charles Pallavicini =

Lieutenant of the Sovereign Military Order of Malta

János Károly or Giancarlo Pallavicini (16 May 1911 in Új-Arad, then Kingdom of Hungary – 22 September 1999 in Rome, Italy) was a member of the Sovereign Military Order of Malta. He served as Lieutenant of the Order in 1988, during the interregnum between the Grand Masterships of Angelo de Mojana di Cologna and Andrew Bertie.

Pallavicini was admitted to the Order as a Knight of Honour and Obedience on 13 May 1953. On 22 June 1963, he was promoted to the rank of Knight of Obedience, a title later redesignated as Knight of Honour and Devotion in Obedience.
