= Joseph Delaville Le Roulx =

French historian (1855–1911)

Delaville Le Roulx's coat of arms.

Joseph-Marie-Antoine Delaville Le Roulx (15 August 1855 – 4 November 1911) was a French historian whose speciality was the Knights Hospitaller (Order of the Knights of St. John of Jerusalem). He was a knight of the Sovereign Military Order of Malta.

== Biography ==
Joseph Delaville Le Roulx was the great-great-grandson of French shipowner, merchant and politician Joseph Delaville Le Roulx (1747–1803) and studied at the Lycée Condorcet. He entered the École des Chartes in 1874 and graduated in January 1878, third in a class of ten, three of whom were members of the Institut de France. Born into a family originally from Touraine, he wrote his undergraduate thesis entitled l'Administration de Tours sous le gouvernement des élus (1356–1462) (The Administration of Tours under the Government of the Elected). He had a degree in law and a Doctorate in Letters from the Sorbonne. He attended the conferences of the École des Hautes-Études where he presented a study on the Viscounty of Turenne.

In 1878, Delaville Le Roulx left France to settle on the island of Malta to study the archives of the Order of Saint John of Jerusalem. From his research, he wrote a book on Les archives et le trésor de l'Ordre de Saint-Jean-de-Jérusalem à Malte (The Archives and Treasure of the Order of St. John of Jerusalem in Malta), published in 1883. He did not limit himself to the study of these archives alone, but extended his field of research to all the archives available on the Order publishing Cartulaire général de l'Ordre des Hospitaliers de Saint-Jean de Jérusalem (General Cartulary of the Order of the Hospitallers of St. John of Jerusalem) from its installation in Jerusalem until its departure for the island of Cyprus, covering the period 1100–1310). Between 1894 and 1905, he published four volumes of this cartulary, bringing together nearly 5,000 items found in the libraries and archives of Europe. In 1934, E. J. King translated into English portions of the Cartulaire that included rules, statutes, or customs of the order while leaving out any charters or documents that did not contain information pertaining to these topics.

During this period, he published two volumes on La France en Orient au XIV^{e} siècle which he presented as a thesis for his doctorate in letters, published in 1886. He presented a Latin thesis on the origin of the Hospitaller order, De prima origine Hospitalariorum Hierosolymitanorum, published in 1885. He also wrote 18 dissertations on the Order of St. John of Jerusalem, published in 1910 under the title Mélanges sur l'Ordre de saint-Jean-Jérusalem.

In the course of his research, he discovered documents on an order that was little known at the time, the short-lived Order of Montjoye, founded around 1180 by a Spanish count, which developed in the Iberian Peninsula before merging with the Order of the Temple and the Order of Calatrava.

He was received as a member of the French School of Rome in 1878, renewed in 1879 and 1880, and was president of the Société archéologique de Touraine from 1889 to 1892 and of the Société de l'histoire de France. In 1904, he published a history of the Hospitallers in the Holy Land and Cyprus called Les Hospitaliers en Terre sainte et à Chypre (1100–1319). He died just as he was finishing the next volume on the Hospitallers in Rhodes.

== Selected works ==
The works of Delaville Le Roulx include the following.

- Les Hospitaliers à Rhodes, 1310–1421 (1874).
- Documents concernant les Templiers extraits des archives de Malte (1882).
- Les archives la bibliothèque et le trésor de l'Ordre de Saint-Jean de Jérusalem à Malte (1883). The archives the library and treasury of the Order of the Knights of St. John of Jerusalem in Malta.
- La France en Orient au xive siècle: expéditions du maréchal Boucicaut. (1885). An account of the travels of French marshal Jean II Le Maingre (1366–1421), known as Boucicaut, a knight renown for his martial skills and chivalry. He was the leader of the 1399 crusade aimed at relieving Constantinople from its 1394-1402 blockade at the hands of the Turks.
- Cartulaire général de l'Ordre des Hospitaliers, 4 volumes (1894-1904). Collection edited by le Roulx that consists of various charters and documents of the Order of the Knights of St. John of Jerusalem which are numbered and organized chronologically from 1100 to 1310.
- Les Hospitaliers en Terre sainte et à Chypre (1100–1319) (1904).
- Les Hospitaliers à Rhodes jusqu'à la mort de Philibert de Naillac (1310–1421) (1913).

== Bibliography ==
- Claverie, Pierre-Vincent (2005). L'ordre du Temple en Terre Sainte et à Chypre au XIIIe siècle. Nicosia: Centre de Recherche Scientifique. ISBN 9789963080946.
- Delaville Le Roulx, Joseph (1895). Inventaire des pièces de Terre-Sainte de l'ordre de l'Hôpital. Revue de l'Orient Latin, Tome III.
- Delaville Le Roulx, Joseph (1904). Les Hospitaliers en Terre Sainte et à Chypre (1100-1310). E. Leroux, Paris.
- Demurger, Alain (2013). Les Hospitaliers, De Jérusalem à Rhodes 1050-1317. Tallandier, Paris. ISBN 979-1021000605.
- Flavigny, Bertrand Galimard (2006). Histoire de l'ordre de Malte. Perrin, Paris. ISBN 978-2262021153.
- Josserand, Philippe (2009). Prier et combattre, Dictionnaire européen des ordres militaires au Moyen Âge. Fayard, Paris. ISBN 978-2213627205.
- Lock, Peter (2006). The Routledge Companion to the Crusades. Routledge. doi:10.4324/9780203389638. ISBN 0-415-39312-4.
- Murray, Alan V. (2006). The Crusades—An Encyclopedia. ABC-CLIO. ISBN 978-1-57607-862-4.
- Nicholson, Helen J. (2001). The Knights Hospitaller. Boydell & Brewer. ISBN 978-1843830382.
- Riley-Smith, Jonathan (2012). The Knights Hospitaller in the Levant, c. 1070-1309. Palgrave Macmillan. ISBN 978-0-230-29083-9.
- Vann, Theresa M. (2006). Order of the Hospital. The Crusades––An Encyclopedia, pp. 598–605.
