= Flag and coat of arms of the Sovereign Military Order of Malta =

Flag of the Knights Hospitaller and Jerusalem

Sovereign Military Hospitaller Order of Saint John of Jerusalem, of Rhodes and of Malta
- State Flag
- Proportion: 2:3
- Adopted: 1259; 767 years ago
- Design: A red field with the white Latin cross extending to the edges of the flag
- Flag of the Order's Works
- Design: A red field with a white Maltese cross in the center
- Grand Master's flag
- Design: Red with a white Maltese cross surrounded by the collar of the order and surmounted by a crown

The flag and coat of arms of the Sovereign Military Order of Malta, or the Jerusalem flag, display a white cross on a red field (blazon gules a cross argent), ultimately derived from the design worn by the Knights Hospitaller during the Crusades.

The flag represents the Sovereign Military Order of Malta as a sovereign institution. The state flag bears a Latin cross that extends to the edges of the flag. The flag of the Order's works represents its humanitarian and medical activities, and bears a white Maltese cross on a red field. Both flags together represent the Sovereign Military Order of Malta. Its constitution states: "The flag of the Order bears either the white Latin cross on a red field or the white eight-pointed cross (cross of Malta) on a red field."

== History ==
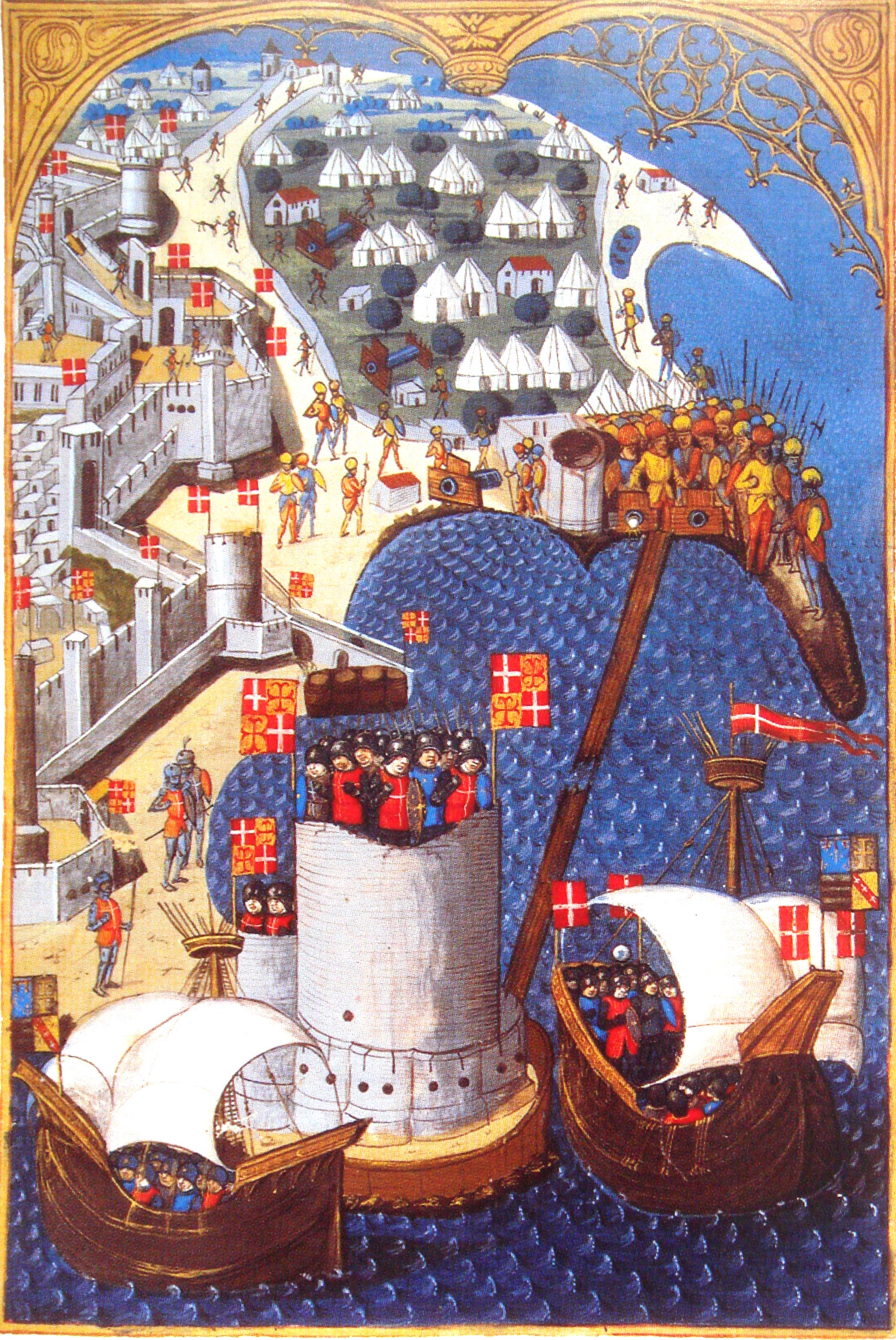
Banners of the order at the Siege of Rhodes (1480), shown as gules a cross argent, and as counter-quarterly gules a cross argent and or a cross ancrée gules (c. 1483).

The arms of the Knights Hospitaller were granted in 1130 by Pope Innocent II, for differentiation from the Templars who displayed the reversed colours. The "eight-pointed cross" is also said to originate in the 12th century, under Raymond du Puy (this was at first a cross fourchée or cross ancrée, and developed into the fully articulated Maltese cross only around or after 1500).

A papal bull of Alexander IV in 1259 decreed the white cross design to be displayed on the mantling of the Knights of Malta. After that, the emblem was adopted as a general symbol for the Order. In the time after the Hospitallers moved to Cyprus in 1291, the banner of a white cross in a red field was flown by naval ships under the command of Knights of St John.

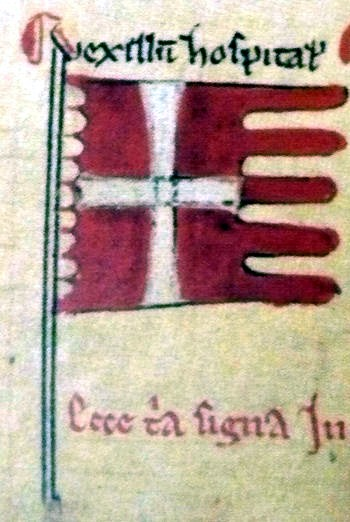
Banner of the Hospitallers (vexillum hospitalorum) as depicted in the Chronica Maiora by Matthew Paris, c. 1250.

Coat of arms of the Knights Hospitaller (circa 1259).

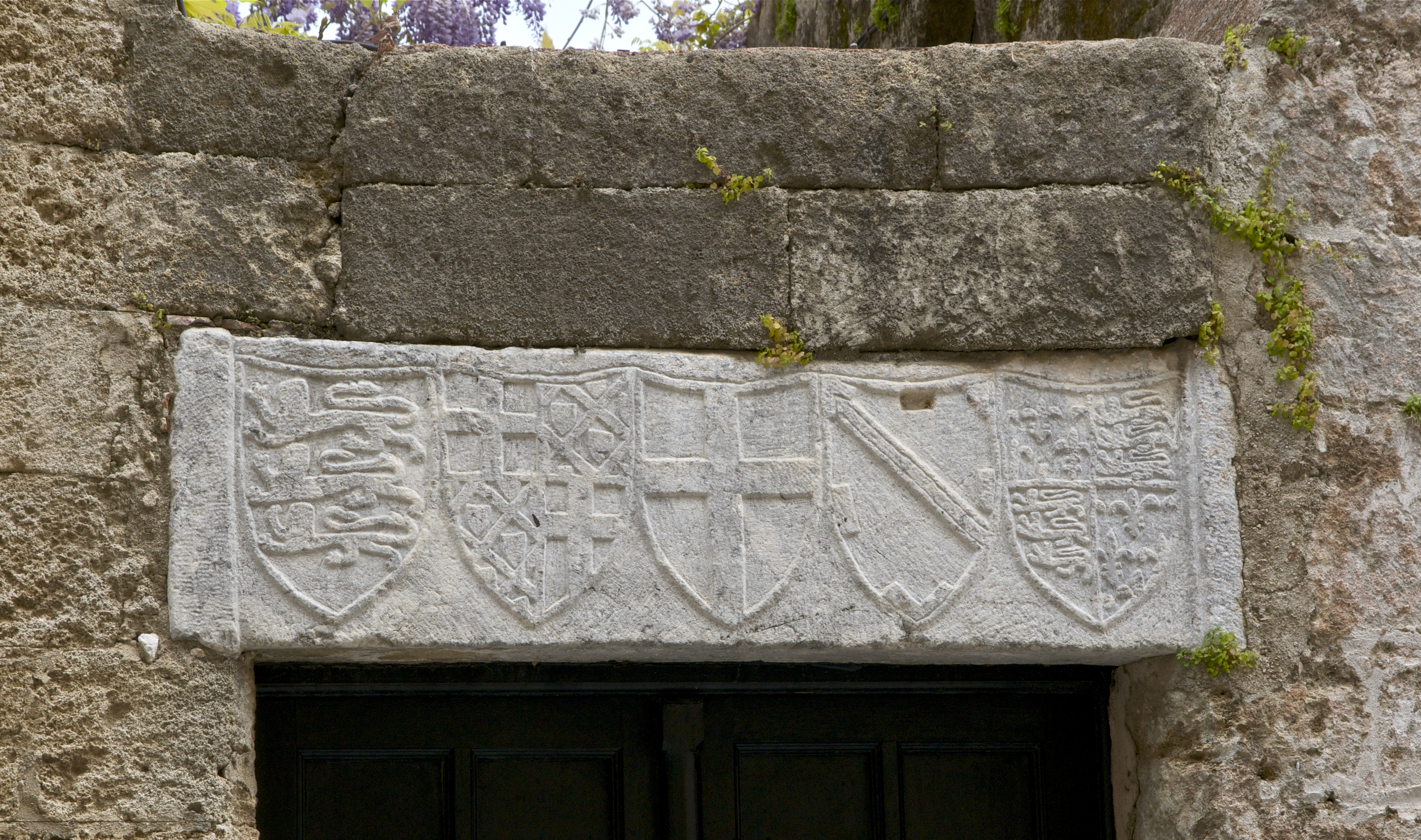
A lintel on the Street of the Knights of Rhodes, featuring the coat of arms of the Knights of Rhodes (in the center), flanked by the coats of arms of Grand Masters Hélion de Villeneuve (r. 1319–1346) and Dieudonné de Gozon (r. 1346–1353), again flanked by the coats of arms of England and of king Edward III of England, c. 1350.

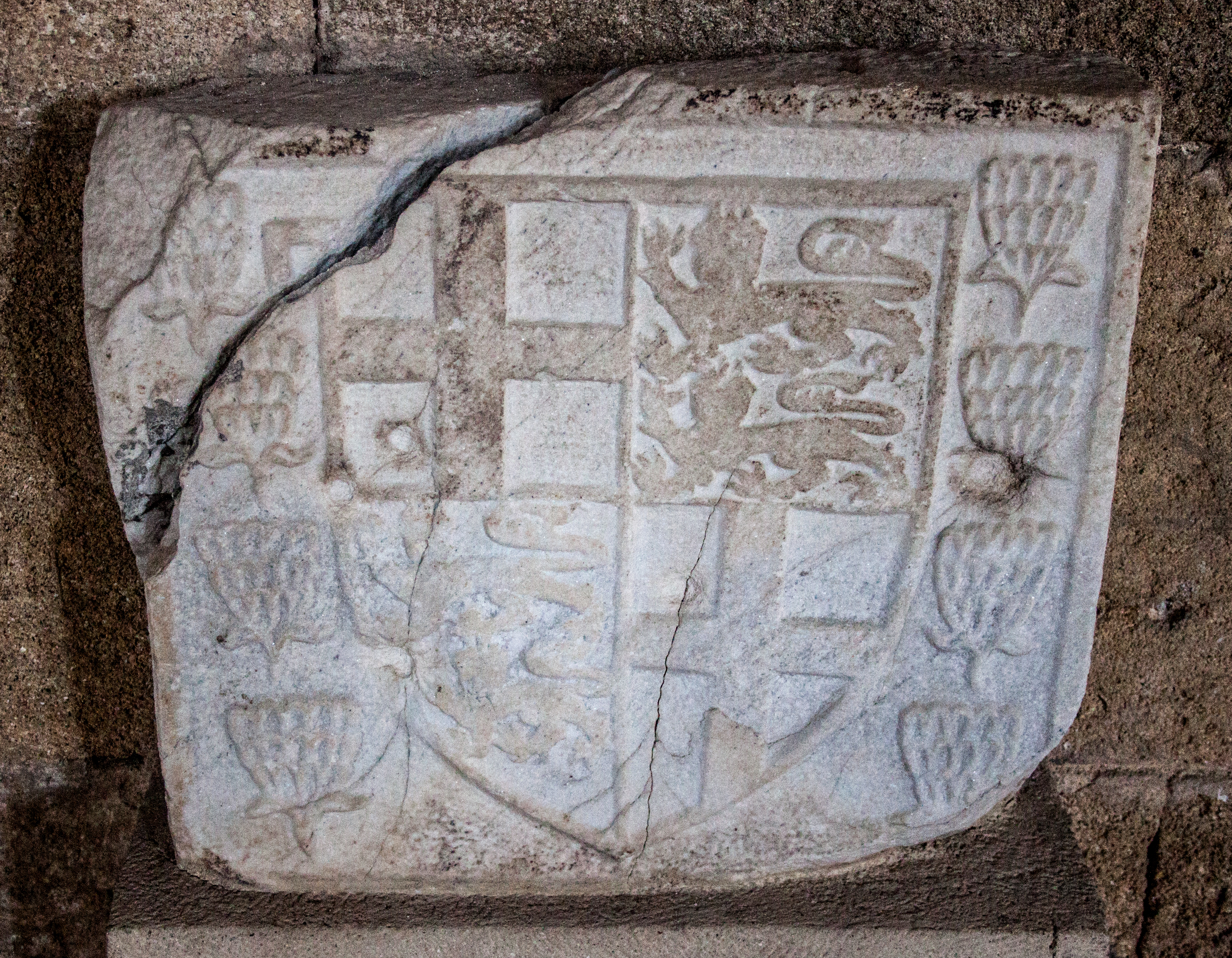
Coat of arms of Philibert de Naillac as Grand Master (r. 1396–1421), from his tower in the harbour of Rhodes (early 15th century).

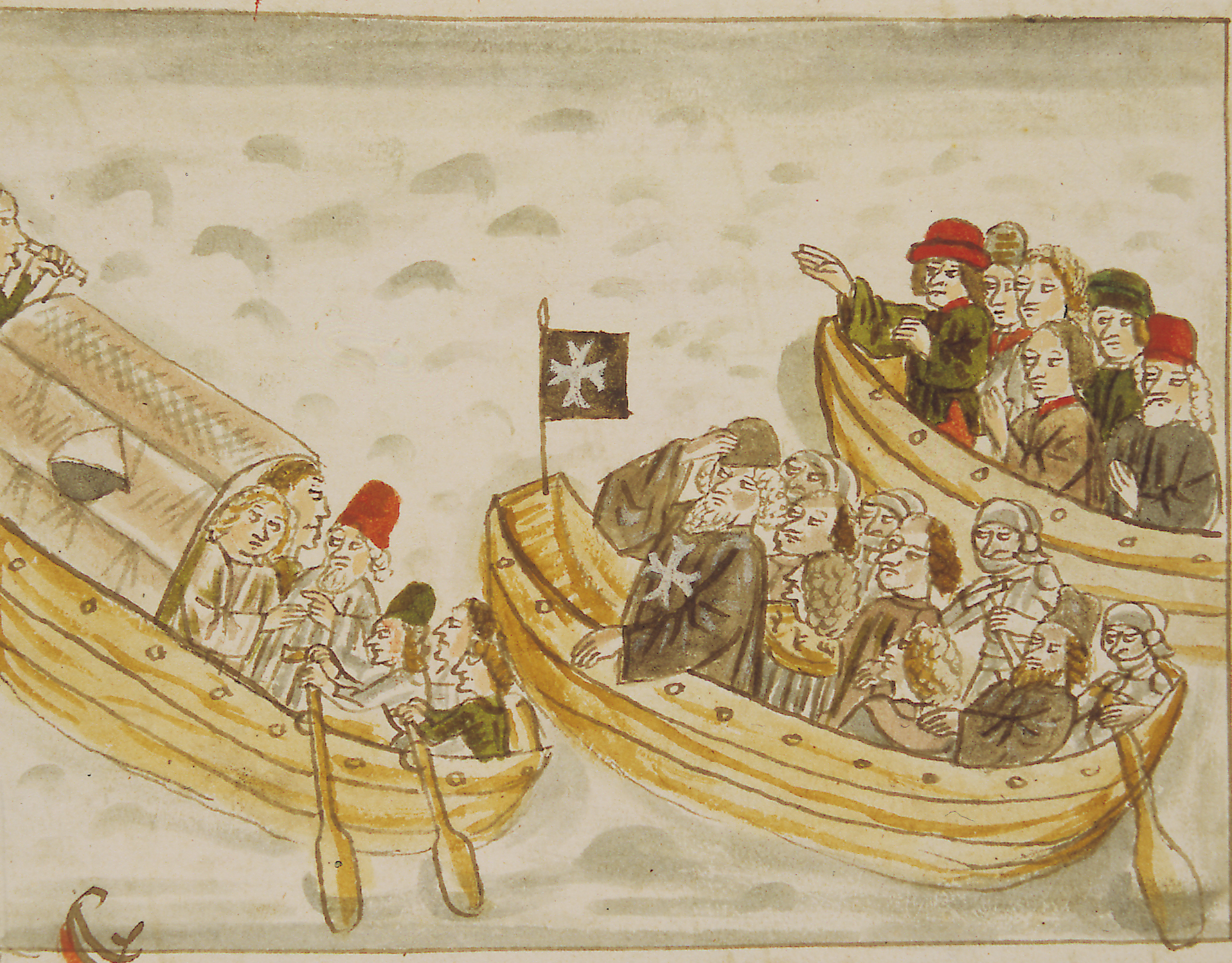
Johann Loesel, grand prior of the langue of Germany, displaying a flag with an eight-pointed cross on a black field in his role as mediator in the Old Zürich War in February 1446 (illustration of Gerold Edlibach's chronicle, c. 1500)

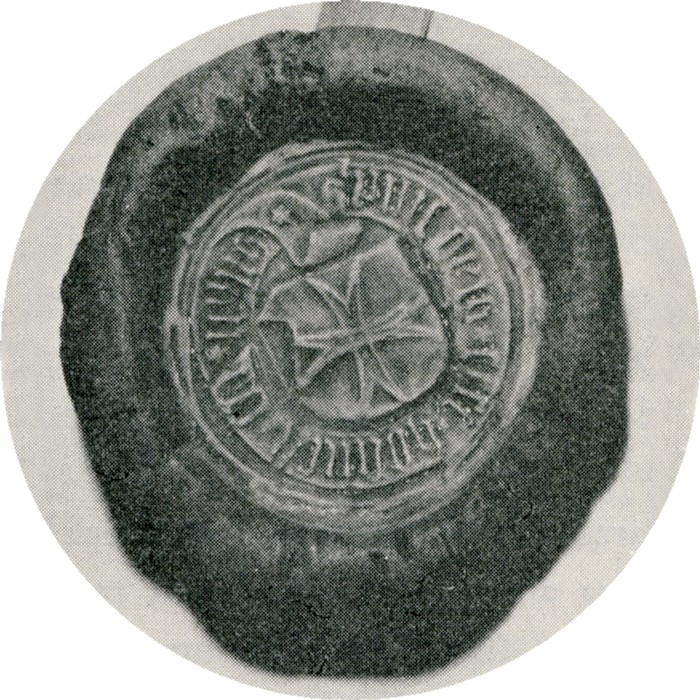
The eight-pointed cross (cross fourchée) on the seal of the provost of St John's church, Stockholm, dated 1526.

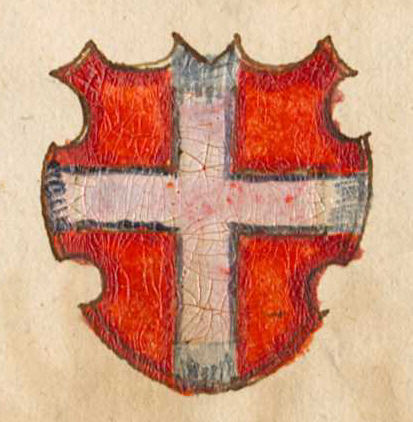
Coat of arms of Grand Master Philip Riedesel zu Camberg, dated 1594.

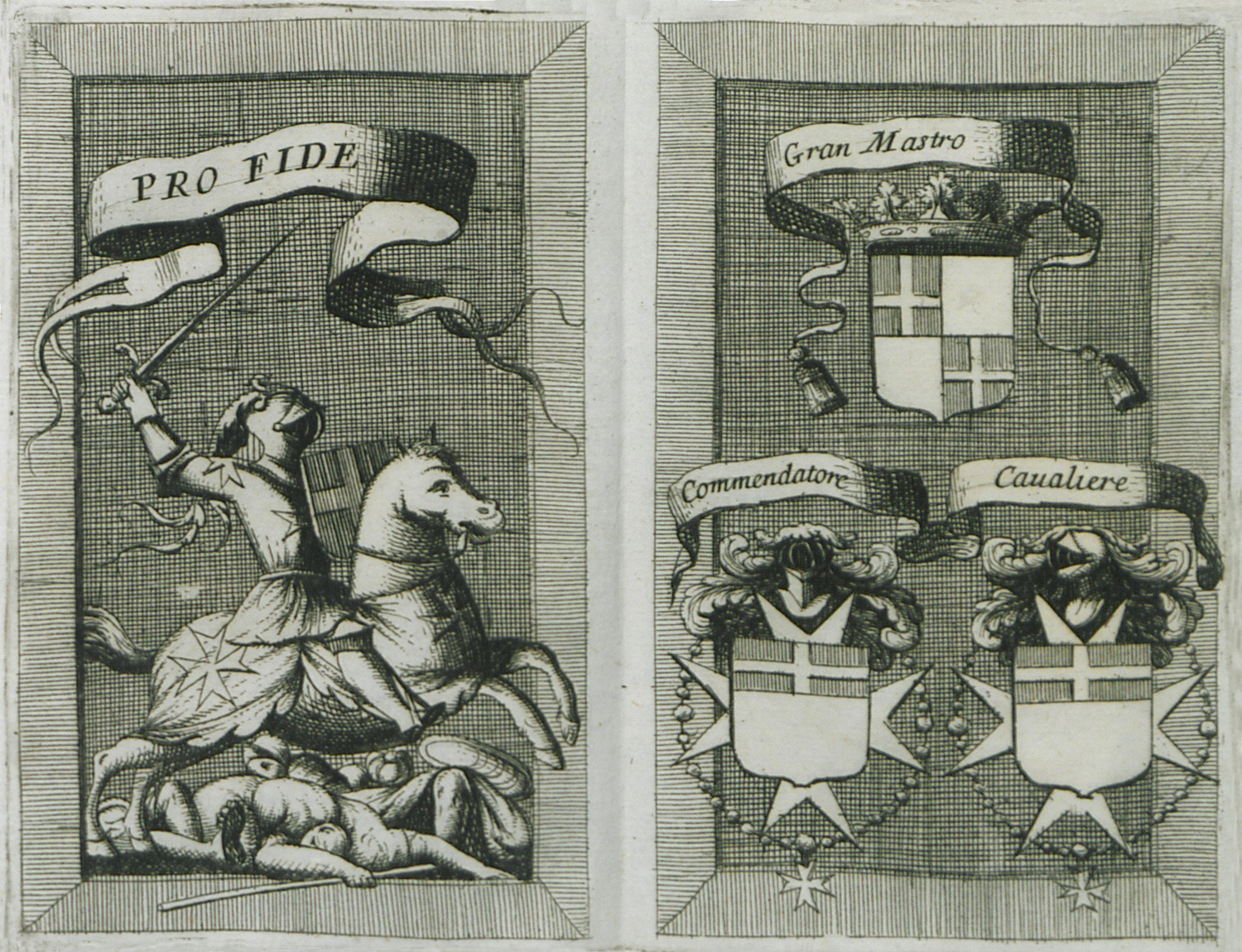
Coat of arms of the Knights Hospitaller of Rhodes, gules a cross argent shown quartered (1,4) for the Grand Master, and in chief for commanders and ordinary members (1695).

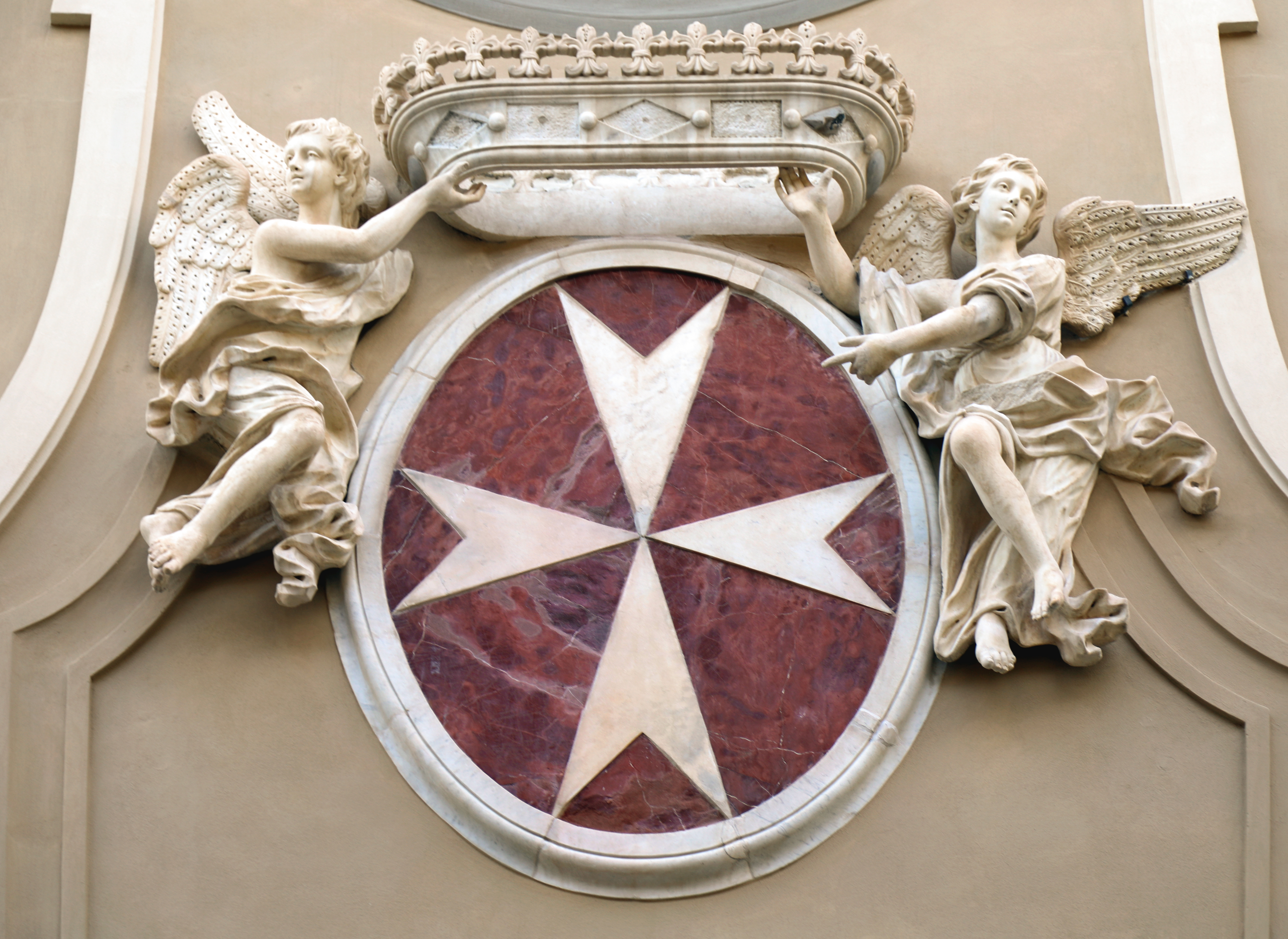
Emblem of the Military Order of Malta on the facade of San Giovannino dei Cavalieri, Florence (1699).

== Flag variants ==
Today the flag flies from the SMOM's headquarters at Palazzo Malta in Rome and from other official residences and embassies. Together with the flag of Malta, it is also flown from Fort St Angelo in Birgu, Malta. It goes with the Grand Master and members of the Sovereign Council when they make official visits.

The Flag of the Order's Works, featuring a Maltese cross, is flown by the SMOM's Grand Priories, Subpriories, and National Associations. As a symbol of its humanitarian works, the Order flies it at its hospitals and medical facilities. It is sometimes described as the "Grand Master's flag," but it is not used as a personal standard.

The Grand Master's personal flag is red with a white Maltese cross surrounded by the collar of the order and surmounted by a crown. It flies over the SMOM's magistral seats when the Grand Master is in residence.

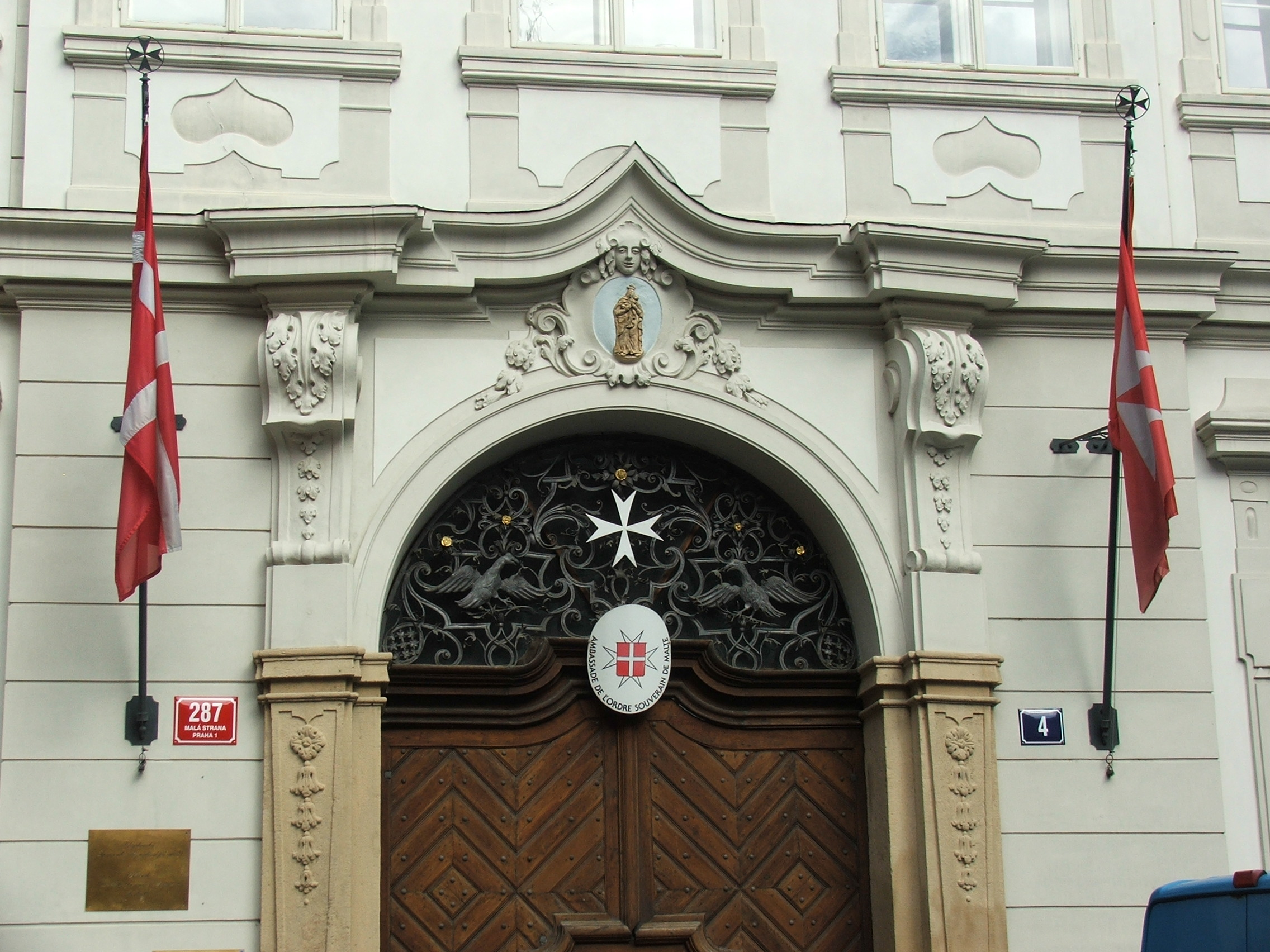
Embassy of the SMOM in Prague flying both the State Flag and the Flag of the Order's Works

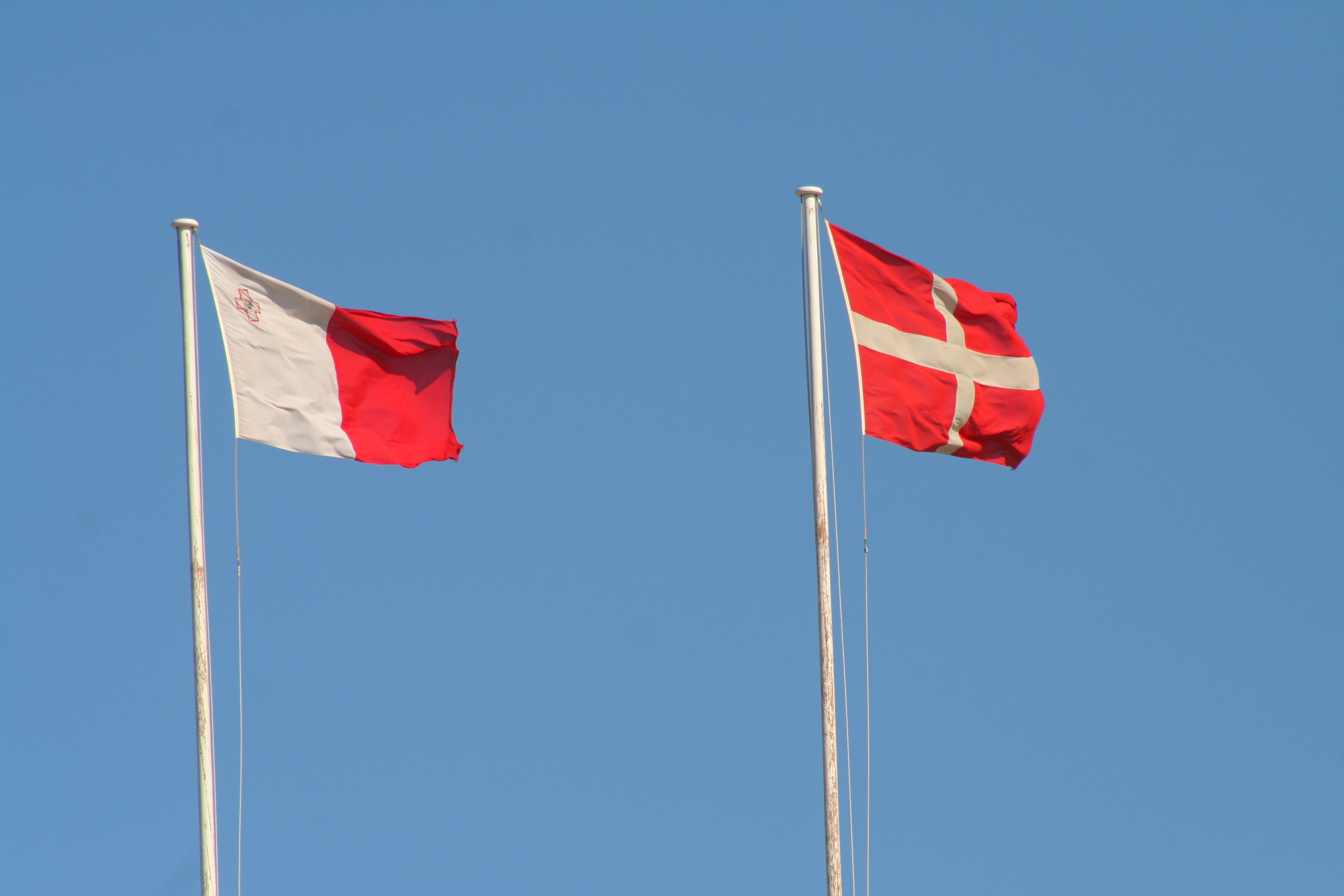
Flags of Malta and the SMOM at Fort St. Angelo

== Coat of arms ==
Coat of arms of the Sovereign Military Order of Malta
- Armiger: John T. Dunlap, Prince and Grand Master of Sovereign Military Order of Malta
- Adopted: 1998; 28 years ago (current version)

As of 1998, "The armorial bearings of the Order display a white latin cross on a red oval field, surrounded by a rosary, all superimposed on a white eight-pointed cross and displayed under a princely mantle surmounted by a crown" as defined in article 6 of the Constitutional Charter.

== See also ==
- Postage stamps and postal history of the Sovereign Military Order of Malta
- List of grand masters of the Knights Hospitaller

=== Similar-appearing flags ===
Flag of Denmark

Flag of Savoy

Flag of Switzerland
