= Helen J. Nicholson =

Medieval historian

Helen J. Nicholson FRHistS FLSW is Emerita Professor of Medieval History and former Head of the History Department at Cardiff University. She is a world-leading expert on the military religious orders and the Crusades, including the history of the Templars.

Nicholson studied for a BA in Ancient and Modern History at St Hilda's College, University of Oxford. Nicholson was awarded her PhD from the University of Leicester in 1990 following an Open Research Scholarship. Her doctoral thesis was entitled "Images of the military orders, 1128–1291: Spiritual, secular, romantic". Her PhD was supervised by Norman Housley. Nicholson taught at the University of Leicester before her appointment as lecturer in the History Department at Cardiff University in 1994.

== Publications ==
- Templars, Hospitallers and Teutonic Knights: Images of the Military Orders, 1128–1291 (Leicester: Leicester University Press, 1993).
- Chronicle of the Third Crusade: A Translation of the Itinerarium Peregrinorum et Gesta Regis Ricardi with introduction and notes (Aldershot, Hants and Brookfield, VT: Ashgate, 1997).
- (edited) The Military Orders, vol. 2: Welfare and Warfare (Aldershot, Hants, and Brookfield, VT: Ashgate, 1998).
- The Knights Templar: A New History (Stroud: Sutton, 2001); 2nd edn: The Knights Templar: A Brief History of the Warrior Order (London: Constable & Robinson, 2010).
- The Knights Hospitaller (Woodbridge: Boydell and Brewer, 2001).
- Love, War, and the Grail: Templars, Hospitallers and Teutonic Knights in Medieval Epic and Romance, 1150–1500 (Leiden: Brill, 2001).
- Medieval Warfare. Theory and Practice of War in Europe, 300–1500 (Basingstoke: Palgrave, 2003).
- The Crusades, Greenwood Guides to Historic Events of the Medieval World (Westport, CT: Greenwood, 2004) ISBN 0-313-32685-1.
- (edited) Palgrave Advances in the Crusades (Basingstoke and New York: Palgrave Macmillan, 2005).
- (edited with Johannes A. Mol and Klaus Militzer) The Military Orders and the Reformation: Choices, State Building and the Weight of Tradition. Papers of the Utrecht Conference, 30 September-2 October 2004 (Hilversum: Verloren, 2006) ISBN 90-6550-913-5.
- (edited with Jochen Burgtorf) International Mobility in the Military Orders (Twelfth to Fifteenth Centuries): Travelling on Christ's Business (Cardiff: University of Wales Press, 2006) ISBN 0-7083-1907-6.
- (edited with Anthony Luttrell) Hospitaller Women in the Middle Ages (Aldershot, Hants and Burlington, VT: Ashgate, 2006) ISBN 0-7546-0646-5.
- (edited with Karl Borchardt and Nikolas Jaspert) The Hospitallers, the Mediterranean and Europe: Festschrift for Anthony Luttrell (Aldershot, Hants and Burlington, VT: Ashgate, 2007) ISBN 978-0-7546-6275-4.
- The Knights Templar on Trial: The Trial of the Templars in the British Isles, 1308–1311 (Stroud: The History Press, 2009) ISBN 978-0-7509-4681-0.
- (edited with Jochen Burgtorf and Paul F. Crawford) The Debate on the Trial of the Templars (1307–1314) (Farnham, Surrey & Burlington, VT: Ashgate, 2010) ISBN 978-0-7546-6570-0.
- The Proceedings Against the Templars in the British Isles (Farnham: Ashgate, 2011) volume 1 ISBN 978-1-4094-3650-8, volume 2 ISBN 978-1-4094-3652-2 .
- (edited) On the Margins of Crusading – The Military Orders, the Papacy and the Christian World, Crusades Subsidia 4 (Farnham, Surrey & Burlington, VT: Ashgate, 2011) ISBN 978-1-4094-3217-3.
- (edited with Sarah Lambert) Languages of love and hate: conflict, communication, and identity in the medieval Mediterranean (Turnhout: Brepols Publishers 2012).
- (edited with Susan B. Edgington) Deeds done beyond the Sea: essays on William of Tyre, Cyprus and the Military Orders presented to Peter Edbury, Crusades Subsidia 6 (Farnham, Surrey & Burlington, VT: Ashgate, 2014) ISBN 978-14724178-31.
- "La Damoisele del chastel": Women's Role in the Defence and Functioning of Castles in Medieval Writing from the Twelfth to the Fourteenth Centuries, in Crusader Landscapes in the Medieval Levant (2016). University of Wales Press, pp. 387–402.
- The Everyday Life of the Templars: The Knights Templar at Home (Stroud: Fonthill Media, 2017) ISBN 978-1-78155-373-2.
- (edited with Karl Borchardt, Karoline Döring, and Philippe Josserand) The Templars and their Sources, Crusades Subsidia 10 (London: Routledge, 2017) ISBN 978-1-138-20190-3.
- The Knights Templar (Amsterdam: University Press, 2021) ISBN 9781641891691, doi:10.1515/9781641891691
- Sybil, Queen of Jerusalem, 1186–1190 (London: Routledge, 2022) ISBN 978-1-138-63651-4, doi:10.4324/9781315205960.
- Women and the Crusades (Oxford: Oxford University Press, 2023) ISBN 978-0-19-880672-1, doi:10.1093/9780198806721.001.0001
- Women, the Crusades, the Templars and Hospitallers in Medieval European Society and Culture (London: Routledge, 2025) ISBN 978-1-032-56574-3, doi:10.4324/9781003436171
- Myth and Reality: Studies on the Templars and Hospitallers, Medieval Narratives, and the Trial of the Templars (London: Routledge, 2026) ISBN 978-1-032-56571-2, doi:10.4324/9781003436164
