= Cartulaire général de l'Ordre des Hospitaliers =

The Cartulaire général de l'Ordre des Hospitaliers de Saint-Jean de Jérusalem (1100–1310) is a four-volume set of medieval documents. It is often cited as source material by scholars of medieval history, the Crusades, or the Military Orders. The collection was edited by J. Delaville le Roulx, and published in Paris between 1894 and 1906. The collection consists of various charters and documents of the Order of the Knights of St. John of Jerusalem which are numbered and also organized in chronological order, starting in 1100 and ending in 1310. Its abbreviation is often CGOH, Cart. Gen., or simply Cart.

In 1934 E.J. King translated into English portions of the Cartulaire that included any rules, statutes, or customs of the order while leaving out any charters or documents that did not contain information pertaining to these topics.
