= List of monuments damaged by conflict in the Middle East during the 21st century =

This is a list of monuments suffering damage from conflict in the Middle East during the 21st century. It is sorted by country.

== Egypt ==
- The Museum of Islamic Art in Cairo is home to one of the world's most impressive collections of Islamic art. It includes over 100,000 pieces that cover the entirety of Islamic history. The Cairo site was first built in 1881 and underwent a multi-million dollar renovation between 2003 and 2010. On January 24th, 2014 a car bomb attack targeting the Cairo police headquarters on the other side of the street caused considerable damage to the museum and destroyed many artifacts. It is estimated that 20-30% of the artifacts will need restoration. The blast also severely damaged the buildings facade, wiping out intricate designs in the Islamic style. The Egyptian National Library and Archives in the same building was also affected.

== Iraq ==
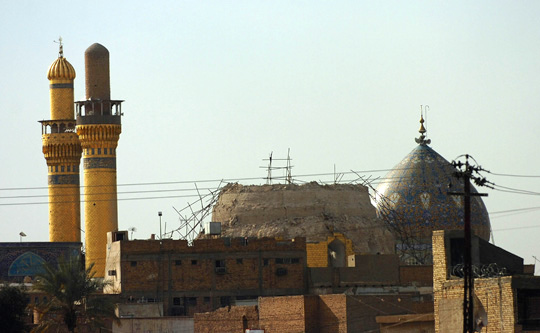
The Al-Askari Mosque in Samarra after the first bombing, 2006.

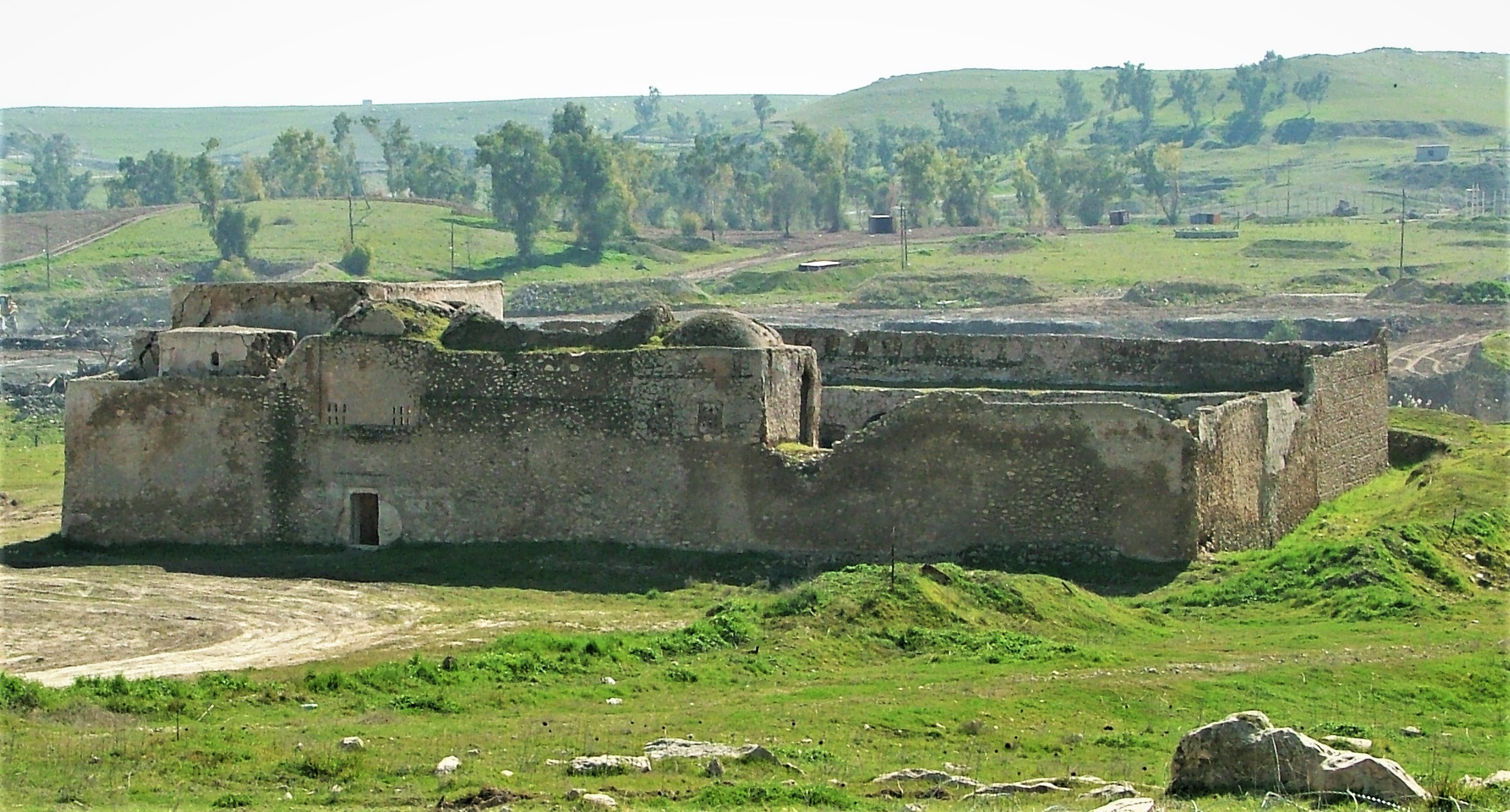
Dair Mar Elia monastery

- Dair Mar Elia, also known as Saint Elijah's monastery. The Christian monastery near Mosul was founded in the late 6th century, and its sanctuary was built in the 11th century. The monastery was damaged during the invasion of 2003, before being completely destroyed by ISIL in 2014.
- Nimrud. The ancient Assyrian city around Nineveh Province, Iraq was home to countless treasures of the empire, including statues, monuments, and jewels. Following the United States-led 2003 invasion the site has been devastated by looting, with many of the stolen pieces finding homes in a museum abroad.
- Great Mosque of Samarra. Once the largest mosque in the world, built in the 9th century on the Tigris River north of Baghdad. The mosque is famous for Malwiya Tower, a 52-meter minaret with spiraling ramps for worshipers to climb. The site was bombed in 2005, in an insurgent attack on a NATO position, destroying the top of the minaret and surrounding walls.
- Al-Askari Shrine was severely damaged in a bombing in 2006 by unknown, masked assailants which resulted in the complete destruction of its golden dome.
- Tomb of Jonah. The purported resting place of the biblical prophet Jonah, along with a tooth by some believed to be from the whale that consumed him in the myth. The site dated to the 8th century BC, and was of great importance to Christian and Muslim faiths. It was entirely blown up by ISIL militants in 2014 as part of their campaign against perceived apostasy.

== Lebanon ==
- Old Beirut suffered through a brutal 15-year civil war, successive battles with Israel, and sweeping urban development. It is referred to as the "Paris of the Middle East" and is known for its impressive landscape Ottoman, French and Art Deco architecture. Officials report that just 400 of 1200 protected historic buildings remain.
- Tibnin Castle was damaged during the Israeli invasion of Lebanon in 2024 and one of its walls collapsed.

== Libya ==
- Cyrene (Libya). A key city for the Greeks and Romans, established in 630 BC. Famed as the basis for enduring myths and legends, such as that of the huntress heroine of the same name and bride of Apollo. The ruins were some of the best preserved from that period.

In May 2011, a number of objects excavated from Cyrene in 1917 and held in the vault of the National Commercial Bank in Benghazi were stolen. Looters tunnelled into the vault and broke into two safes that held the artefacts which were part of the so-called 'Benghazi Treasure' . The whereabouts of these objects are currently unknown.

Parts of the UNESCO World Heritage Site of Cyrene were destroyed in August 2013 by locals to make way for homes and shops. Approximately 200 vaults and tombs were leveled, as well as a section of a viaduct dating to the third century BC. Artifacts were thrown into a nearby river.

== Palestine ==
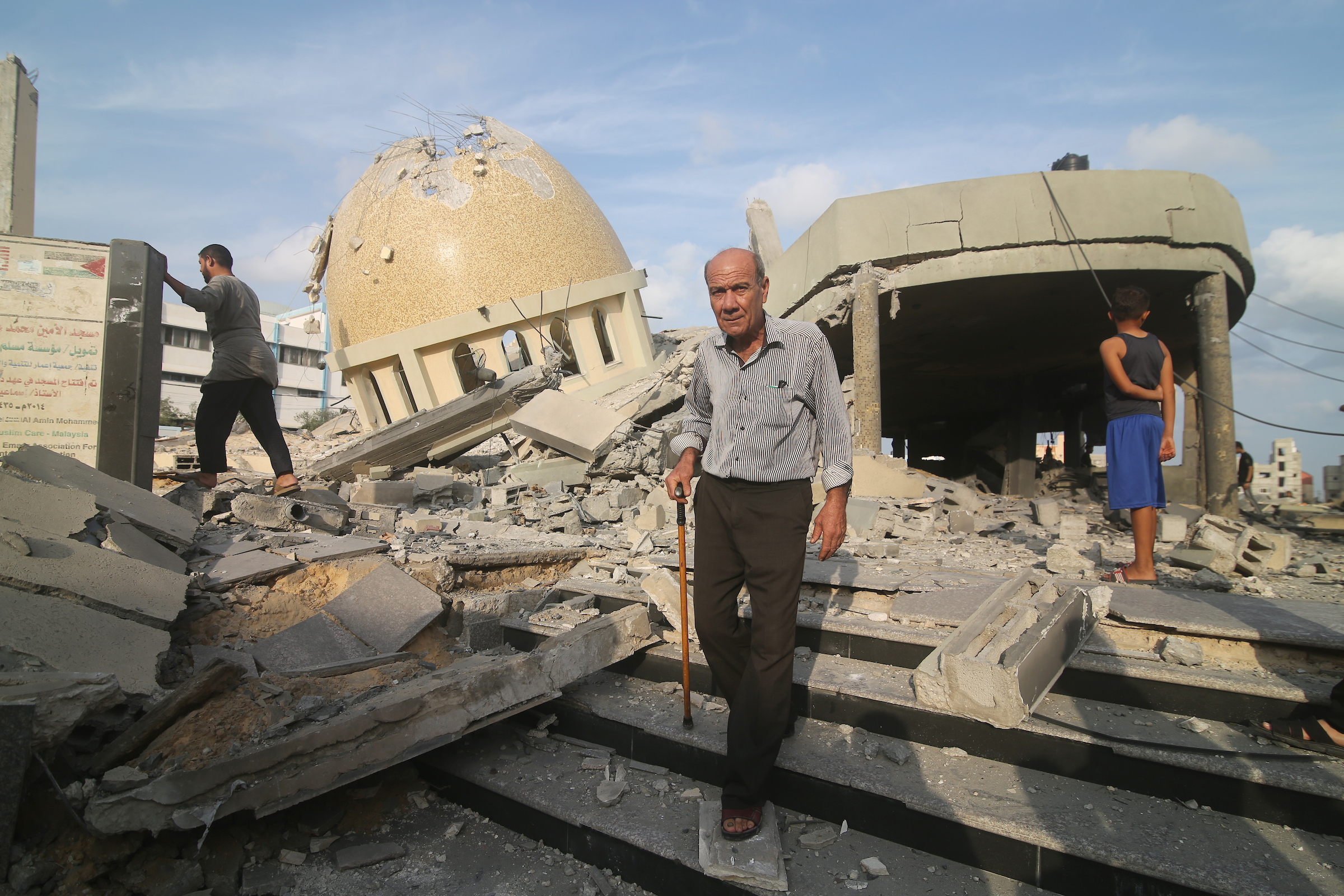
The al-Amin Muhammad Mosque was destroyed by the Israeli bombing of Khan Yunis on 8 October 2023.

After the Israeli invasion of Gaza in 2023, mmuch of the Old City of Gaza was severely damaged or destroyed by Israeli airstrikes, including the Great Omari Mosque and the Church of Saint Porphyrius – the oldest mosque and oldest church in Gaza, respectively – as well as other historical sites such as the Ibn Uthman Mosque, the Pasha Palace, the As-Saqqa Palace, the Al-Qissariya Market, and the Hamam al-Sammara. The ancient port of Anthedon was completely destroyed. Museums including the Al Qarara Cultural Museum, the Akkad Museum, and the Rafah Museum were looted, damaged, or destroyed.

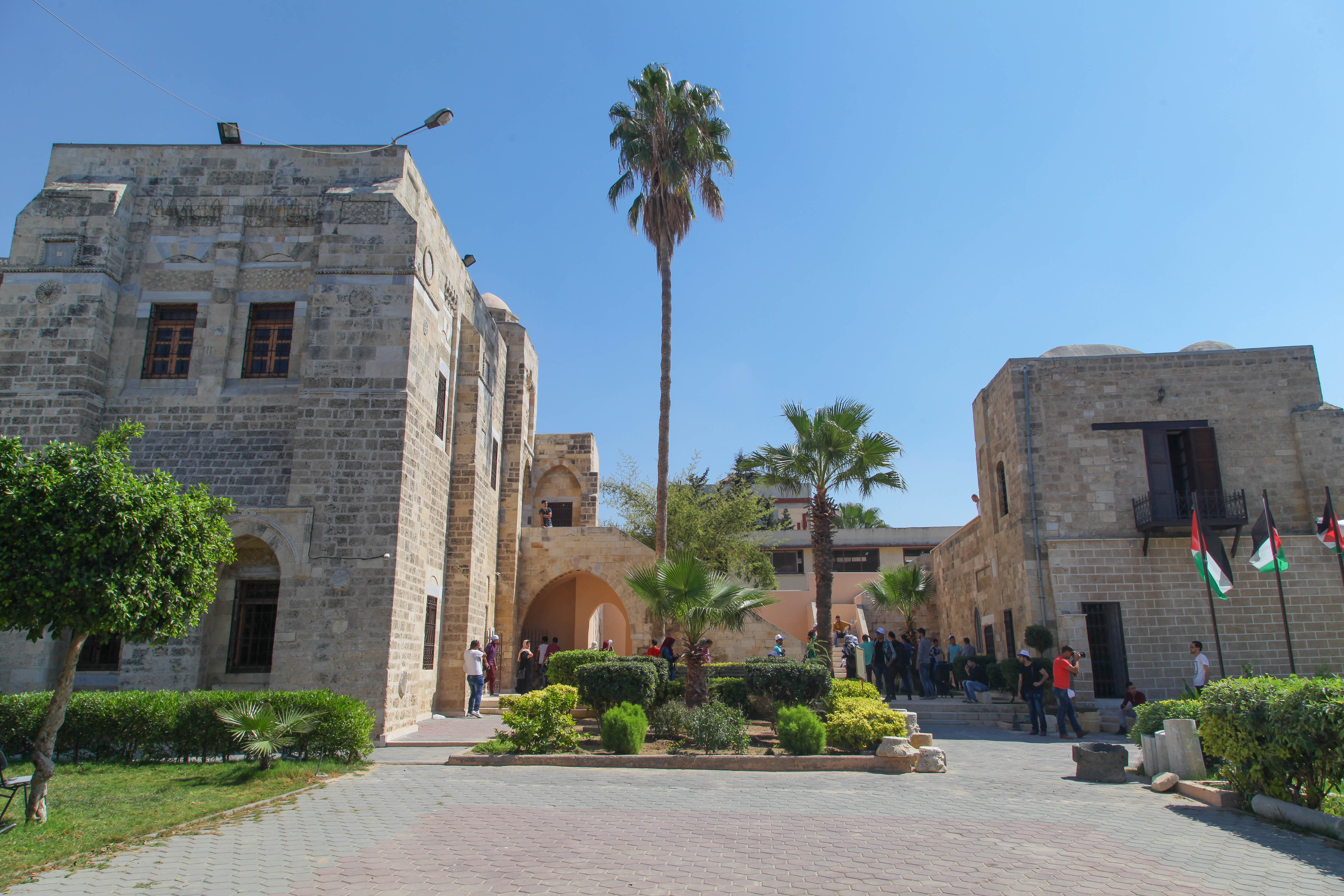
The 13th-century Qasr al-Basha in the Old City of Gaza (pictured in 2016) was bombed and bulldozed during the Israeli invasion of 2023.

- Al-Omari Mosque, Gaza. Ancient monument in the heart of Jabalya's old town that dates back to the Mamluk Era. The walls, dome and roof were destroyed by Israeli airstrikes during the 2015 fighting in Gaza, along with dozens more historic sites.According to tradition, the mosque stands on the site of the Philistine temple dedicated to Dagon—the god of fertility—which Samson toppled in the Book of Judges. Later, a temple dedicated to Marnas—god of rain and grain—was erected. Local legend today claims that Samson is buried under the present mosque. The mosque is well known for its minaret, which is square-shaped in its lower half and octagonal in its upper half, typical of Mamluk architectural style. The minaret is constructed of stone from the base to the upper, hanging balcony, including the four-tiered upper half. The pinnacle is mostly made of woodwork and tiles, and is frequently renewed. A simple cupola springs from the octagonal stone drum and is of light construction similar to most mosques in the Levant.

== Syria ==
- The ancient city of Bosra. Continually inhabited for 2,500 years, and became the capital of the Romans' Arabian empire/ The centerpiece is a magnificent Roman theatre dating back to the second century that survived intact until the current century. Archeologists have revealed the site is now severely damaged from mortar shelling in 2011-2012 during the Arab Spring.

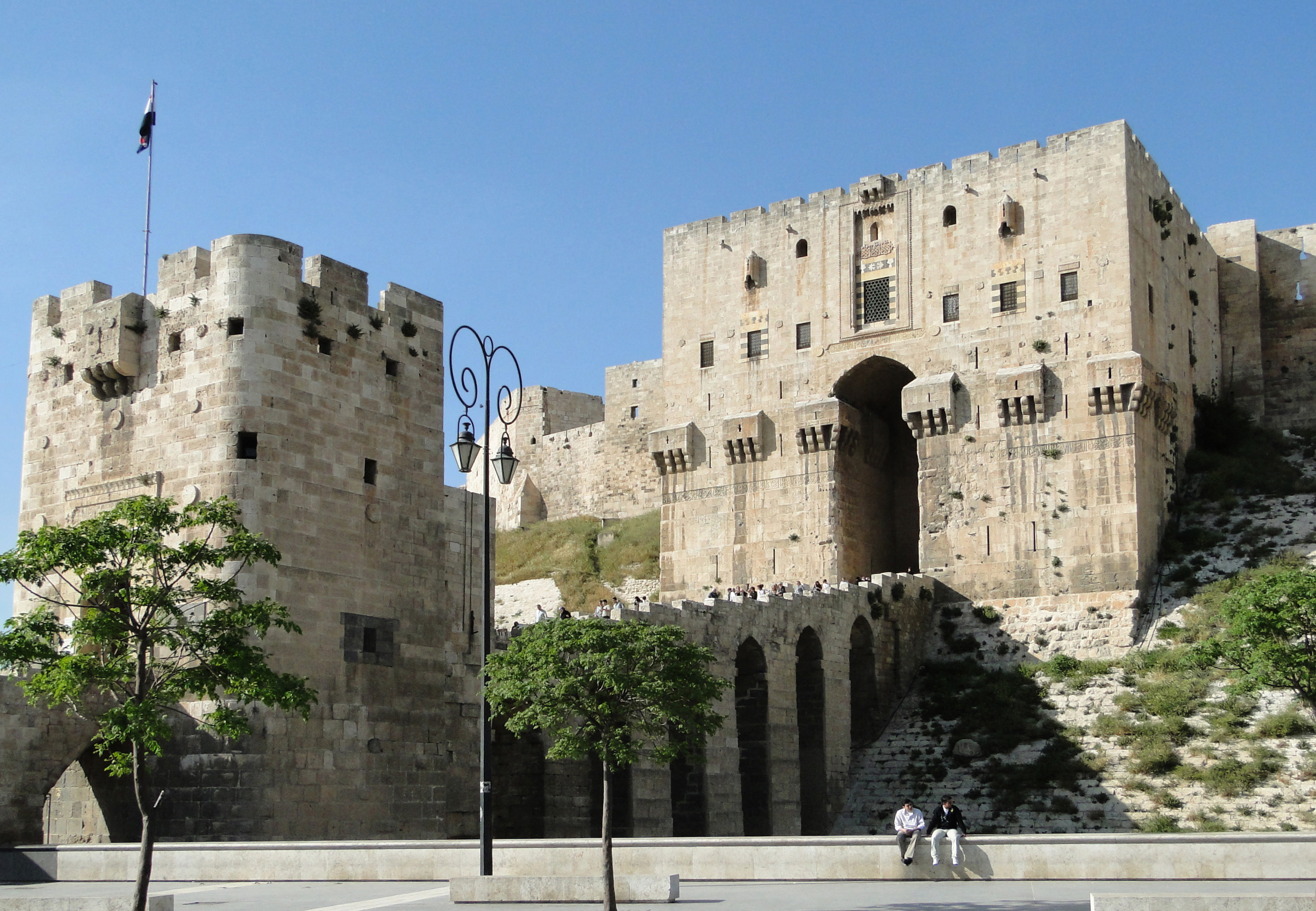
The fortified entrance of the Citadel of Aleppo

- Citadel of Aleppo. The fortress spans at least four millennia, from the days of Alexander the Great, through Roman, Mongol, and Ottoman rule. The site has barely changed since the 16th century and is one of Syria's most popular World Heritage sites.

In August 2012, during the Battle of Aleppo of the Syrian civil war, the external gate of the citadel was damaged after being shelled during a clash between the Free Syrian Army and the Syrian Army to gain control over the citadel.

During the conflict, the Syrian Army used the Citadel as a military base, with the walls acting as cover while shelling surrounding areas and ancient arrow slits in walls being used by snipers to target rebels. As a result of this contemporary usage, the Citadel has received significant damage.

- Armenian Genocide Memorial Church (Der Zor). Memorial site to the 1.5 million killed between 1915 and 1923, the Deir Ez-zor became a yearly destination for pilgrims from around the world. The site included a church, museum, and fire that burned continuously. On 21 September 2014, the memorial complex was blown up by militants of the Islamic State of Iraq and the Levant.
- Al-Madina Souq. The covered markets in the Old City are a famous trade center for the region's finest produce, with dedicated sub-souks for fabrics, food, and accessories. The tunnels became the scene of fierce fighting and many of the oldest are now damaged beyond recognition. This was described by UNESCO as a tragedy.
- Deir ez-Zor suspension bridge. This French-built suspension bridge was a popular pedestrian crossing and vantage point for its views of the Euphrates River. The bridge was destroyed by Free Syrian Army militiamen during the Syrian civil war in May 2013. Deir Ez-zor's Siyasiyeh Bridge was also destroyed.
- Khalid ibn al-Walid Mosque. Among Syria's most famous Ottoman-style mosques, which also shows Mamluk influence through its light and dark contrasts. As of 2007, activities in the mosque were organized by shaykhs Haytham al-Sa'id and Ahmad Mithqan. Stamps depicting the mosque have been issued in several denominations.

The Khalid ibn al-Walid Mosque has been a symbol of anti-government rebels during the Syrian civil war. According to The New York Times, Syrian security forces killed 10 protesters participating in a funeral procession as they were leaving the mosque on 18 July 2011. The mosque, which the Syrian government stated had been turned by the rebels into an "arms and ammunition depot", was abandoned by the rebels on 27 July 2013. Shelling by government forces damaged Khalid's tomb inside the mosque. Following its capture by the Syrian Army, state media showed heavy damage inside the mosque, including some parts of it being burned, and the door to the tomb destroyed.

- Krak des Chevaliers. The Crusader castle from the 11th century survived centuries of battles and natural disasters, becoming a World Heritage Site in 2006 along with the adjacent castle of Qal'at Salah El-Din.

During the Syrian Civil War which began in 2011 UNESCO voiced concerns that the conflict might lead to the damage of important cultural sites such as Krak des Chevaliers. It has been reported that the castle was shelled in August 2012 by the Syrian Arab Army, and the Crusader chapel has been damaged. The castle was reported to have been damaged in July 2013 by an airstrike during the Siege of Homs, and once more on the 18th of August 2013 it was clearly damaged yet the amount of destruction is unknown. The Syrian Arab Army recaptured the castle and the village of al-Hosn from rebel forces during the Battle of Hosn on March 20, 2014, although the extent of damage from earlier mortar hits remained unclear.

- Palmyra. An "oasis in the Syrian desert" according to UNESCO, this Aramaic city has stood since the second millennium BC and featured some of the most advanced architecture of the period. The site subsequently evolved through Greco-Roman and Persian periods, providing unique historic insight into those cultures.

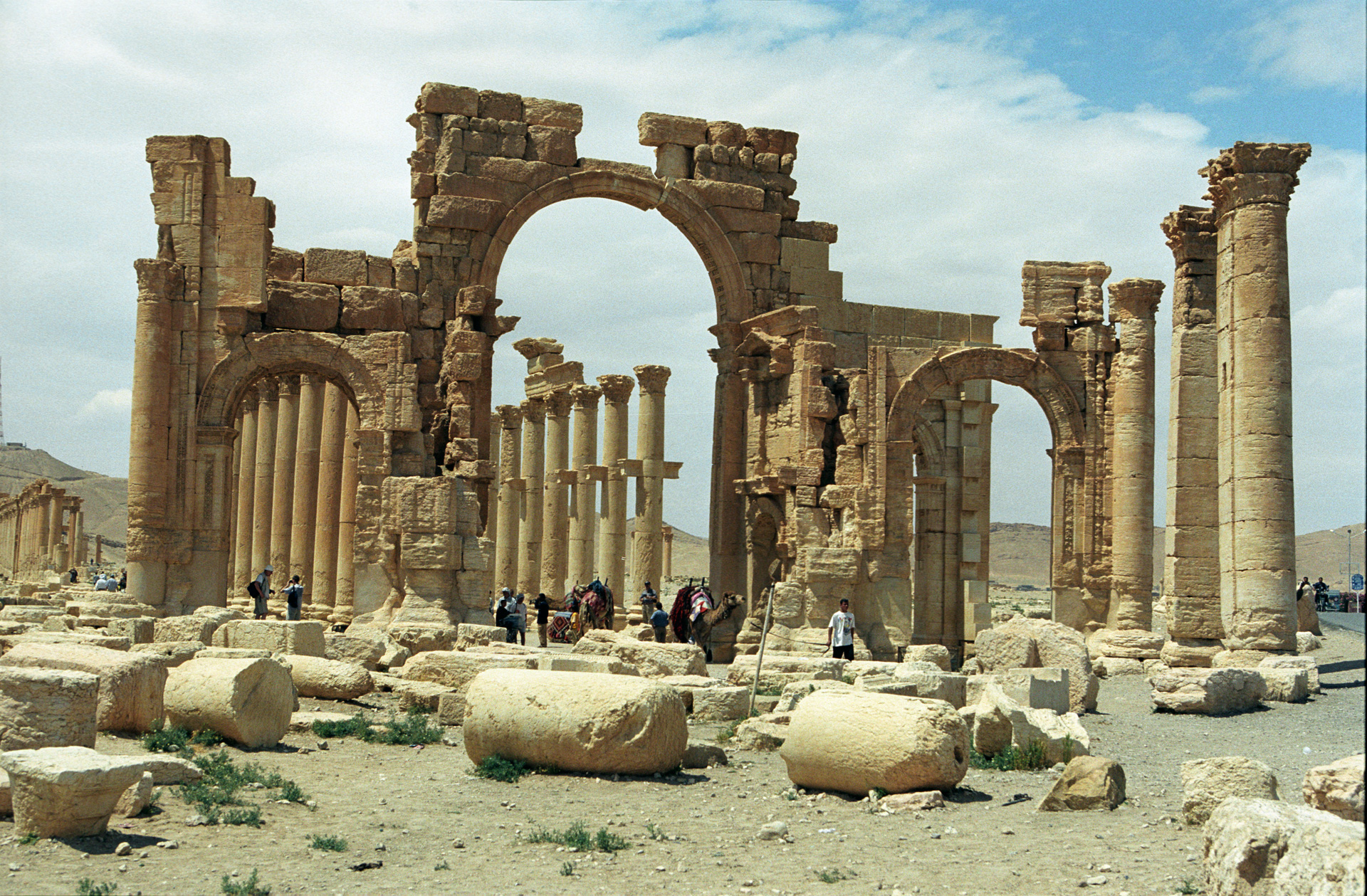
Monumental arch in the eastern section of Palmyra's colonnade

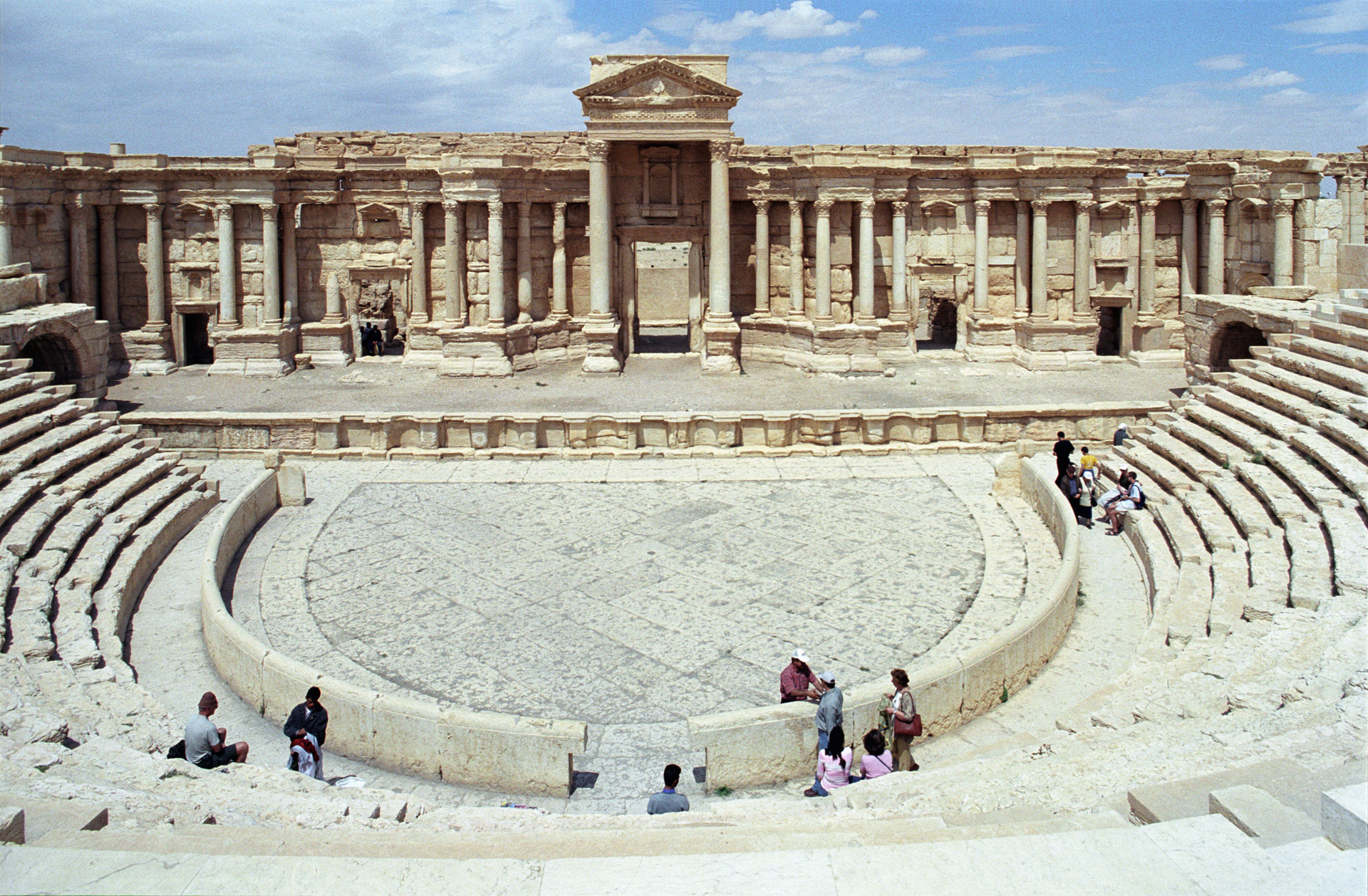
Palmyra's theater

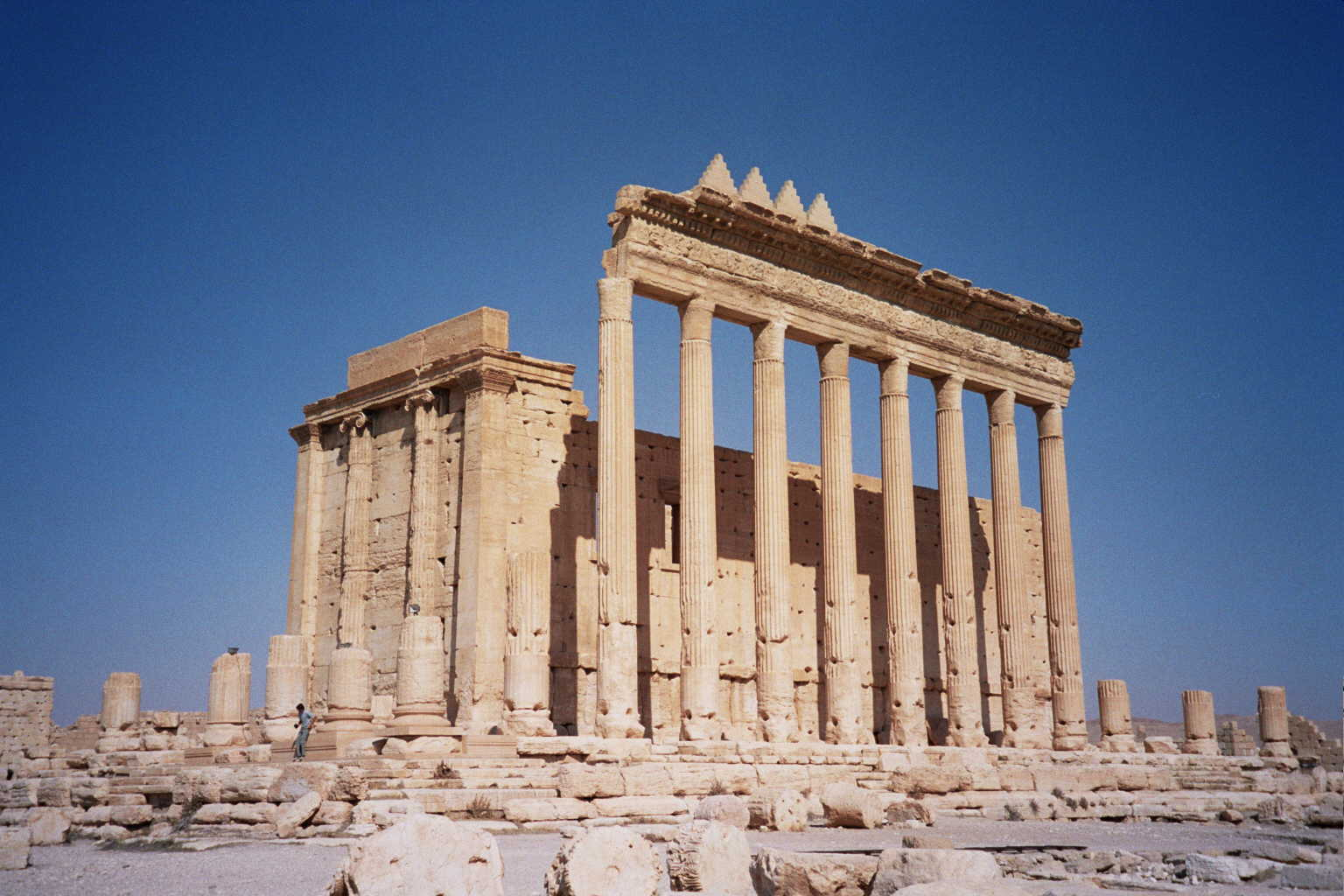
Main shrine of the Temple of Bel

As a result of the Syrian Civil War, Palmyra experienced widespread looting and damage by combatants. During the summer of 2012, concerns about looting in the museum and the site increased when an amateur video of Syrian soldiers carrying funerary stones was posted. However, according to France 24's report, "From the information gathered, it is impossible to determine whether pillaging was taking place." The following year the facade of the temple of Bel sustained a large hole from mortar fire, and colonnade columns have been damaged by shrapnel. According to Maamoun Abdulkarim, director of antiquities and museums at the Syrian Ministry of Culture, the Syrian Army positioned its troops in some archaeological-site areas, while Syrian opposition soldiers stationed themselves in gardens around the city.

On 13 May 2015, the ISIL launched an attack on the modern town, sparking fears that the iconoclastic group would destroy the site. On 21 May, ISIL forces entered the World Heritage Site. Local residents reported that the Syrian air force bombed the site on 13 June, damaging the northern wall next to the Temple of Baalshamin. The Temple of Baalshamin and the Temple of Bel were demolished by ISIL in August 2015.

- The Great Mosque of Aleppo. A World Heritage Site originally built in 715 by the Umayyad dynasty, ranking it among the oldest mosques in the world. The epic structure evolved through successive eras, gaining its famous minaret in the late 11th century.

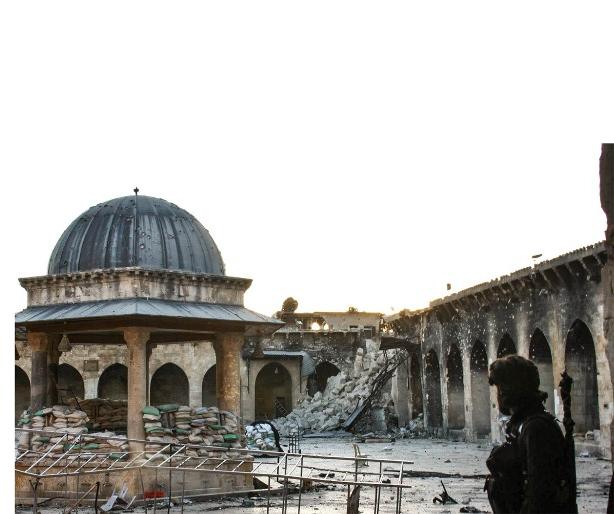
Mosque in 2013, after destruction of the minaret

On 13 October 2012 the mosque was seriously damaged during clashes between the armed groups of the Free Syrian Army and the Syrian Army forces. President Bashar al-Assad issued a presidential decree to form a committee to repair the mosque by the end of 2013.

The mosque was seized by rebel forces in early 2013, and, as of April 2013, is within an area of heavy fighting, with government force stationed 200 meters (660 ft) away.

On 24 April 2013 the minaret of the mosque was reduced to rubble during an exchange of heavy weapons fire between government forces and rebels during the ongoing Syrian civil war. The Syrian Arab News Agency (SANA) reported that members of Jabhat al-Nusra detonated explosives inside the minaret, while opposition activists said that the minaret was destroyed by Syrian Army tank fire as part of an offensive. Countering assertions by the state media of Jabhat al-Nusra's involvement, opposition sources described them as rebels from the Tawhid Brigades who were fighting government forces around the mosque. The opposition's main political bloc, the Syrian National Coalition (SNC), condemned the minaret's destruction, calling it "an indelible disgrace" and "a crime against human civilization."

== Yemen ==
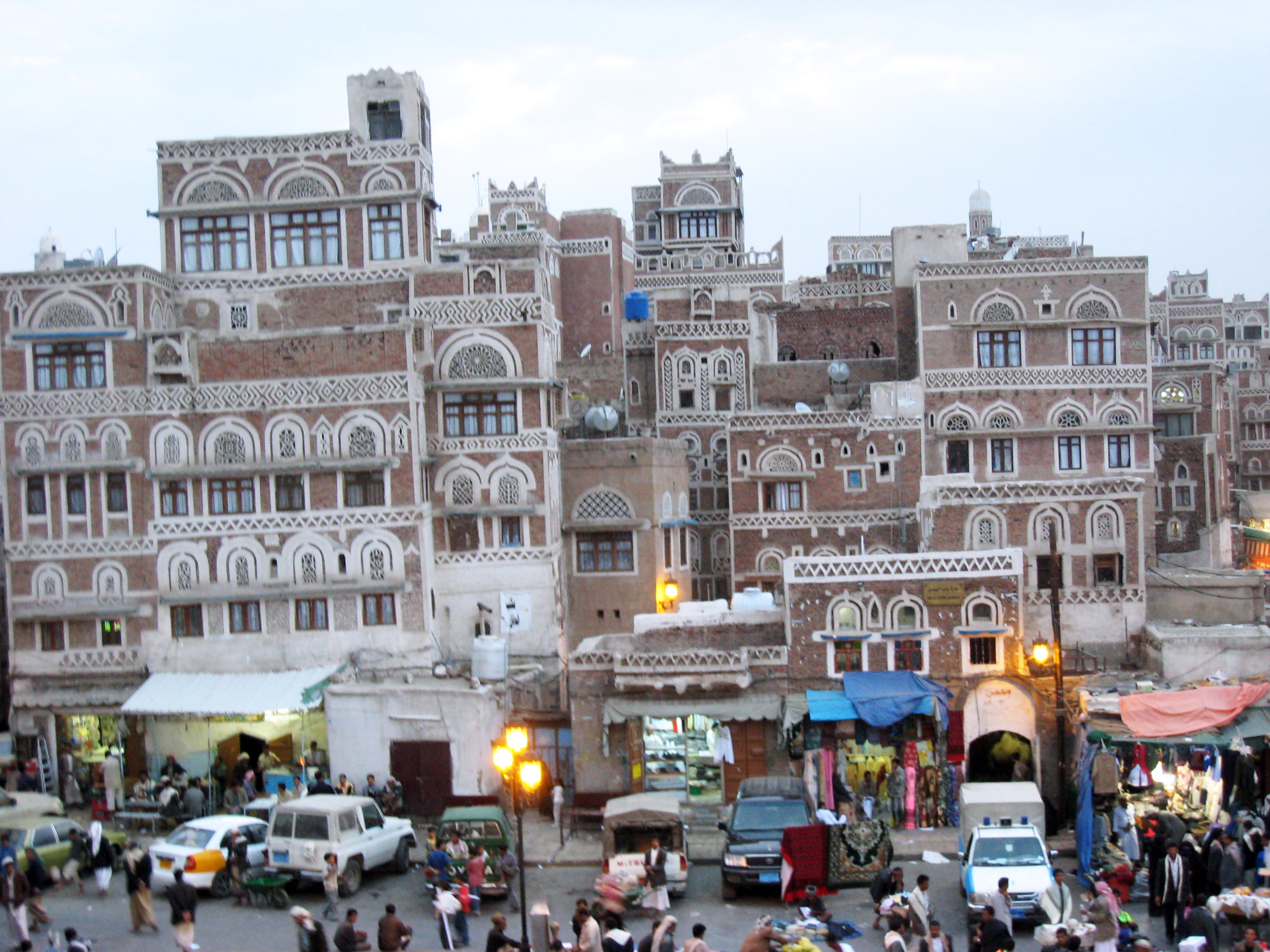
Sana'a, city center

- Sana'a old city. Yemen's capital city of Sana'a has been struck by suicide bombings (for which ISIL has claimed responsibility) and air-strikes by the Saudi-led coalition. These have affected the old fortified city—inscribed on UNESCO's World Heritage List since 1986—and the archaeological site of the pre-Islamic walled city of Baraqish, causing, according to UNESCO, "severe damage".

== See also ==
- Destruction of art
- List of heritage sites damaged during the Syrian Civil War
- List of World Heritage in Danger
- Lost artworks
- List of destroyed heritage
- Destruction of Art in Afghanistan
