= Qal'at al-Hisn =

Qal'at al-Hisn (Arabic: قلعة الحصن, lit. 'Castle Fort') may refer to:

- Hippos, Israel, an archaeological site in the northern Jordan Valley
- Krak des Chevaliers, a Crusader castle in Syria
