= Battle of Hosn =

Battle of the Syrian Civil War

- Part of Syrian Civil War
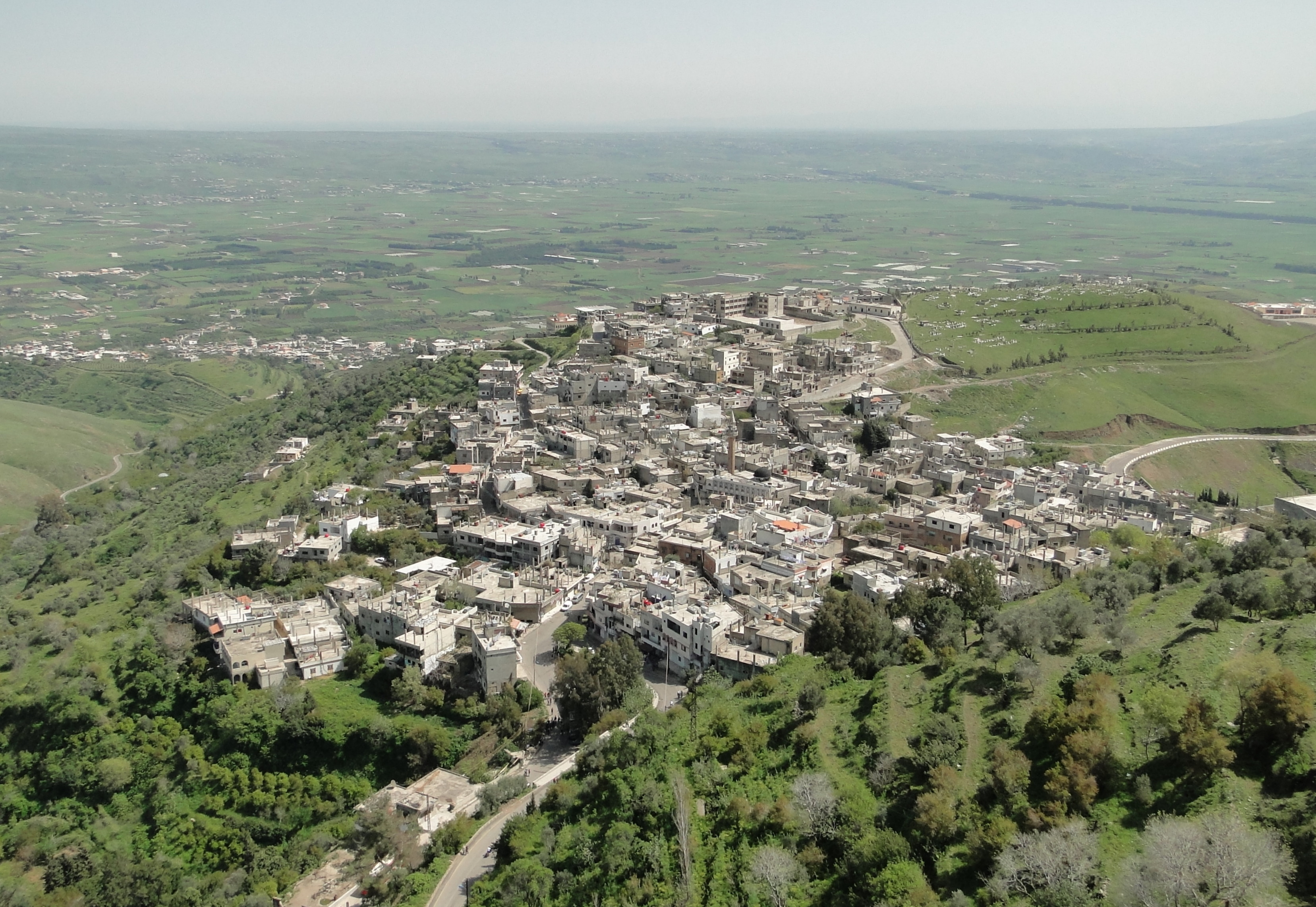
- Hosn village
Date	20 March 2014
Location	Al-Husn, Homs Governorate, Syria
Result	Syrian government victory: Army takes Krak des Chevaliers

Belligerents
(Syria) Syrian Arab Republic; Hezbollah	Free Syrian Army; Islamic Front; Al-Nusra Front; Jund al-Sham

Commanders and leaders
(Ba'athist Syria) Unknown	Abu Abdullah al-Hamawi (Ahrar ash-Sham commander); Khaled Mahmoud al-Dandashi † (alias: "Abu Suleiman", Emir and Founder of Jund ash-Sham)

Units involved
Syrian Armed Forces; Syrian Army; National Defense Forces	Islamic Front; Ahrar ash-Sham

Strength
Unknown	300 fighters

Casualties and losses
Several killed	40–93 killed (Army claim); 12 killed (opposition claim)

Map of the Situation in Western Homs, early March 2014

The Battle of Hosn was a one-day battle during the Syrian Civil War that took place around the village of Hosn and its 900-year-old castle of Krak des Chevaliers, a UNESCO World Heritage Site. The village and castle had been in the hands of rebel fighters since 2012; the Syrian Army's objective during the battle was to sever the rebels' supply routes for recruits and weapons coming in and out of Lebanon.

On the morning of 20 March, fighting started around early dawn with a heavy bombardment of the medieval castle where 300 rebels were believed to reside. The town of Hosn itself was also shelled. According to an opposition activist, an agreement for safe conduct of the rebels to Lebanon had been reached the previous day. The military commander leading the battle denied that an agreement had been reached. He stated the military had refused to grant the rebels in the castle safe conduct from the fortress and advanced into it after seeing the rebels retreating. Another opposition activist countered with claims the military ambushed individuals fleeing Hosn, near the Lebanese border, leaving many dead. Government troops took the castle by the early afternoon. Twelve rebel fighters were killed in the engagement inside the castle, including Abu Suleiman Dandashi, an Ahrar ash-Sham brigade commander and Lebanese national. According to military sources, 40–93 rebels were killed as they retreated, including Khaled al-Mahmud, purported to be the leader of the jihadist Jund ash-Sham rebel group. Several government soldiers were also killed in the fighting.

After the capture of Hosn and the castle, the Syrian Army announced that it had regained full control of the western part of the Homs Governorate.
