= Battle of Cresson =

Middle Ages battle

- Part of the Crusades
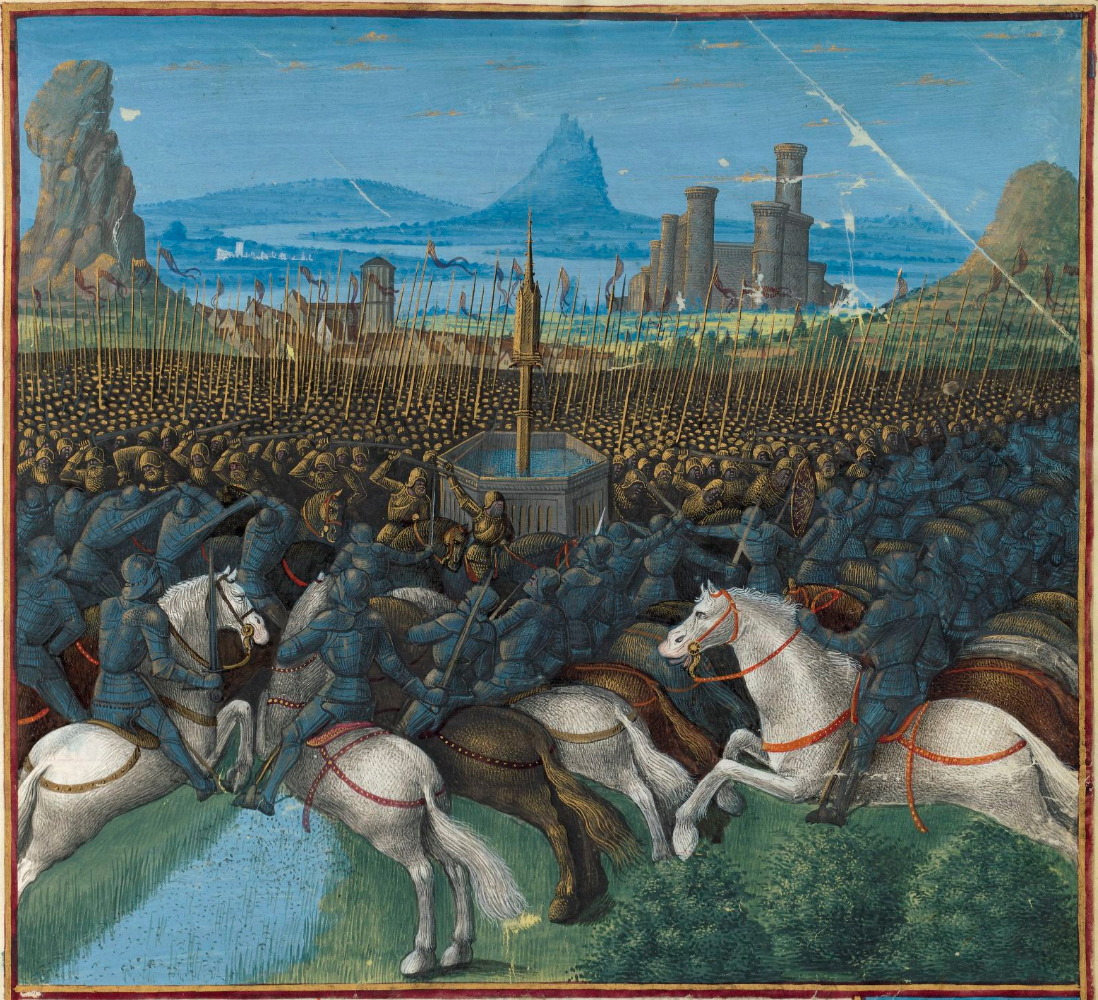
- The Battle of Cresson, miniature by Jean Colombe, in Passages d'outremer ca. 1474
Date	1 May 1187
Location	Between Tiberias and Nazareth, Principality of Galilee 32°44′06″N 35°21′16″E
Result	Ayyubid victory

Belligerents
Knights Templar; Knights Hospitaller; Kingdom of Jerusalem	Ayyubid Sultanate of Egypt

Commanders and leaders
Gerard of Ridefort (WIA); Roger de Moulins †; Robert Fraisnel †	Gökböri; Sarim al-Din Qaymaz al Najmi; Badr al-Din Dildirim al Yaruqi

Strength
Approx. 130 knights (including the Grand Master of both, Templars and Hospitallers); 400 infantry Unknown numbers of turcopoles	700–7,000

Casualties and losses
Most of the army killed and some captured including the wounded Gerard.	Unknown
- Location within Israel

The Battle of Cresson was a small battle between Frankish and Egyptian Ayyubid forces on 1 May 1187 at the "Spring of the Cresson." While the exact location of the spring is unknown, it is located in the environs of Nazareth. The conflict was a prelude to the decisive defeat of the Kingdom of Jerusalem at the Battle of Hattin two months later.

== Location ==
The exact location of the spring is still disputed. Primary sources place the spring near Nazareth. Israeli archaeologist Rafi (Rafael Y.) Lewis believes the springs of Cresson may be near the springs of Sepphoris, due to a 2021 discovery of Frankish arrowheads near the site. British archaeologist Denys Pringle suggests that the spring may refer to 'Ain ad-Daya: a spring that is closer to the Nazareth-Tiberias road, approximately four kilometres west of Kafr Sabt.

== Background ==
Dynastic instability and internal divisions permeated the Kingdom of Jerusalem in the years leading up to and after the death of Baldwin IV. Baldwin, who suffered from leprosy, had appointed various executive regents during his reign (Reynald of Chatillon in 1177; Guy of Lusignan in 1183) to lead the Frankish armies in his stead. When Baldwin's health degenerated again in early 1185, he appointed Count Raymond III of Tripoli as regent. Raymond accepted on condition that all members of the High Court swore that in case both king and heir died, the succession would be decided by an arbitration by the Pope, The Holy Roman Emperor, the King of France and the King of England. When Baldwin IV died in 1185, followed by his nephew Baldwin V in 1186, there was a succession crisis. The party of Sybilla got control of the capital and crowned her, ignoring the oath sworn before Raymond's regency. To appease the barons willing to support her but not her husband Guy, she accepted to divorce him under the condition to be free to choose her next husband. Then, in an unpopular move, Sibylla crowned Guy as king rather than divorcing him. Presented with the fait accompli of the coronation, all barons submitted but for Baldwin of Ramla and Raymond, who refused to swear fealty to Guy. Baldwin of Ramla abdicated his fief for his minor son, and went voluntary in exile, rather than swear fealty to Guy of Lusignan; Raymond retreated to his fief of Tiberias and asked Saladin to provide Muslim troops against a possible attack by the King he refused to recognize.

Saladin, meanwhile, had been consolidating power during the reign of Baldwin IV. His successful campaigns in Mosul, Aleppo, and Egypt resulted in his sultanate being recognized by the Abbasid caliphate. Saladin returned to Damascus following Mosul's fall, having now placed the empire of Nur ad-Din under his uneasy control. In 1185, Saladin had signed a truce treaty with the Franks under then-regent Raymond; however, before the treaty expiration, Reynald captured a caravan of Muslims traveling from Cairo to Damascus that winter When Saladin demanded reparation, King Guy tried to make Reynald pay, but he refused the King's request claiming he was absolute sovereign of his lands and he had no truce with Saladin. In response, Saladin launched an offensive against Reynald's castle at Kerak in 1187, leaving his son al Melik al-Afdal as commander of a detached force at Re’sulma.

== Prelude ==
In response to the encroaching threat from Saladin, Guy assembled the High Court in Jerusalem. A delegation of Gerard of Ridefort, master of the Knights Templar; Roger de Moulins, master of the Knights Hospitaller; Balian of Ibelin, Josicus, Archbishop of Tyre; and Reginal Grenier, lord of Sidon, were selected to journey to Tiberias to make peace with Raymond. Meanwhile, al-Afdal gathered a raiding party to pillage the land surrounding Acre, while Saladin besieged Kerak. Al-Afdal dispatched Muzzafar ad-Din Gökböri, Emir of Edessa, to lead this expedition, accompanied by two ranking emirs, Qaymaz al-Najami and Dildirim al-Yarugi. Knowing that his troops were poised to enter Raymond's territory, Saladin agreed that the raiding party would only pass-through Galilee en route to Acre, leaving Raymond's lands untouched. In Frankish sources, this raiding party consisted of approximately 7000 men; however, modern historians believe 700 men is more accurate.

== Battle ==
On 30 April, the Ayyubid raiding party passed through Raymond's territory unimpeded, before making their way west towards Nazareth. On the same day, both Gerard and Roger arrived at the Templar castle of La Fève near Nazareth. Balian stopped at his fief of Nablus, and Reginald took an alternate route. The De expugnatione Terrae Sanctae libellus (hereafter "the Libellus"), a contemporary Latin chronicle, states that watchmen in Nazareth alerted Gerard and Roger of the Ayyubid raiders. The Lyon Eracles, a Middle French chronicle written by Balian's squire Ernoul, redeems Raymond – saying he had warned them about the raid. Nazareth, falling outside of Raymond's control, was not privy to Raymond's agreement with Saladin. Gerard and Roger assembled a small army consisting of the knights in Nazareth and the Templar garrisons from Qaqun and al-Fulah to meet the Ayyubid threat. This force numbered about 130 knights, an unknown number of turcopoles and sergeants, and up to 400 infantry.

On the morning of 1 May, the Frankish army rode east from Nazareth and happened upon the Ayyubid raiding party at the springs of Cresson where they were watering their horses. At the sight of the Ayyubid force Roger de Moulins and James of Mailly advised a retreat. However, Gerard scorned this advice and insulted the men who gave it. The Frankish cavalry launched an initially successful charge, catching the Ayyubid forces off guard. However, this separated the Frankish cavalry from their supporting infantry. According to Ali ibn al-Althir, the ensuing melee was equally matched; however, the Ayyubid forces succeeded in routing the divided Frankish army. The battle then became more of a massacre. Roger, Master of the Hospitallers, and James of Mailly were among the last to be cut down, they died side by side. Of the Templar knights, only Gerard and two others escaped death, though all three were wounded. They left the field in haste and sought safety in Nazareth. The Ayyubids took an unknown number of secular knights captive. Gokbori's troops proceeded to pillage the surrounding area before returning across Raymond's territory.

== Aftermath ==
Balian was still a day behind Gerard and Roger, and had stopped at Sebastea to attend the May Day Mass. After reaching the castle of La Fève, where the Templars and Hospitallers had camped, he found the place deserted. Balian sent his squire Ernoul ahead to learn what had happened, with news of the disastrous battle discouraging the Frankish forces.

Both Ayyubid and Frankish chroniclers record an overwhelmingly negative Frankish attitude towards Raymond following the battle. Raymond's truce with Saladin was viewed as both a political and religious betrayal. As a result of this backlash, Raymond severed his diplomatic ties to Saladin and returned to Jerusalem with the remaining envoys to pledge his support for Guy. Although the battle reconciled the factions within the Frankish nobility, this political unity cost the Franks a number of influential knights: the Hospitaller Master Roger of Moulins, the Templar Marshal Robert Fraisnel, the Templar Jacquelin of Maillé, and plausibly the Templar Seneschal Urs of Alneto. The Libellus also praises the valor of two fallen Frankish knights: a Templar named Jakelin de Mailly and a Hospitaller named Henry.

Raymond's reversal prompted Saladin to abandon his siege of Kerak. On 27 May, he joined his forces with al-Afdal and Gökböri at Ashtera in southern Syria. With a combined force of approximately 20,000 men, Saladin crossed the Jordan River on 26 June. Four days later he besieged Tiberias. This prompted Guy, Raymond, and Reynald to march north to relieve the city. The Frankish forces were defeated at the Battle of Hattin on 4 July. By October 1187, Saladin had captured Jerusalem.

== Historiographical Considerations ==
The Battle of Cresson is found in contemporary chronicles; however, these accounts differ considerably and have yet to be fully reconciled by historians. The Libellus gives a circumstantial account of the battle. However, the Latin Itinerarium is generally preferred by historians given its contemporaneity with battle itself.

The Old French Continuation of William of Tyre (dated from the 1230s in its present form) includes an account by Balian's squire Ernoul. Ernoul was not present at the battle but recorded the aftermath of the battle several years later. A late thirteenth-century copy of his account, the Lyon Eracles, blamed Gerard for the Frankish defeat. Current scholarship has redeemed Gerard, believing that the negative account reflected contemporary mistrust of the Templars and was not indicative of Gerard's prowess at Cresson.

The chronicle of ibn Al-Athir contains an account of the battle which largely agrees with the Latin sources. The main difference between the two narratives concerns the size of the Ayyubid forces. Ibn Al-Athir describes the battle as a much smaller skirmish than the Latin accounts. Counter to these narratives, Baha ad-Din ibn Shaddad's biography of Saladin reports that Gökböri was in Aleppo in the months preceding Hattin and does not mention his involvement in Cresson.

== For succession of related campaigns see also ==
- 1177: Battle of Montgisard
- 1179: Battle of Banias
- 1179: Battle of Marj Ayyun
- 1179: Battle of Jacob's Ford
- 1182: Battle of Belvoir Castle
- 1183: Battle of Al-Fule
- 1187: Battle of Hattin

== Bibliography ==
Primary Sources

  - Ali ibn al-Athir, The Chronicle of Ibn Al-Athīr for the Crusading Period from Al-Kāmil Fīʼl-taʼrīkh: The years 541-589. Farnham: Ashgate Publishing, 2007.
  - Brewer, Keagan, and James Kane. The Conquest of the Holy Land by Ṣalāḥ Al-Dīn: A Critical Edition and Translation of the Anonymous Libellus De Expugnatione Terrae Sanctae per Saladinum. London, United Kingdom: Routledge, 2020.
  - Chronicle of the Third Crusade, a Translation of Itinerarium Peregrinorum et Gesta Regis Ricardi, translated by Helen J. Nicholson. Ashgate, 1997.
  - De Expugnatione Terrae Sanctae per Saladinum, translated by James A. Brundage, in The Crusades: A Documentary Survey. Marquette University Press, 1962.
  - Mamerot, Sébastien; Masanès, Fabrice; Quéruel, Danielle; Delcourt, Thierry; Colombe, Jean (2009). A chronicle of the Crusades : from Charlemagne to Sultan Bayezid. Köln, Germany: Taschen. ISBN 978-3-8365-0555-0. OCLC 449250639.

Secondary Sources

  - Baha ad-Din ibn Shaddad, The Life of Saladin. London: Committee of the Palestine Exploration Fund, 1897.
  - Nicolle, David (1993). Hattin 1187 : Saladin's greatest victory. London: Osprey. ISBN 1-85532-284-6. OCLC 27770050.
  - Edbury, Peter W. The Conquest of Jerusalem and the Third Crusade: Sources in Translation. Ashgate, 1996.
  - Hamilton, Bernard. The Leper King and his Heirs: Baldwin IV and the Crusader Kingdom of Jerusalem. Cambridge: Cambridge University Press, 2005.
  - Kenneth Setton, ed., A History of the Crusades. Madison, 1969–1989 (available online).
  - Morton, Nicholas. The Crusader States and their Neighbors: A Military History. Oxford: Oxford University Press, 2020.
  - Nicholson, H. and Nicolle, D. God's Warriors: Knights Templar, Saracens and the Battle for Jerusalem. Osprey Publishing, 2006.
  - Denys Pringle, The Spring of Cresson in Crusading History. In Balard, Michel, et al., editors. Die gesta per Francos: Etudes sur les croisades dédiées à Jean Richard. Routledge, 2001.
  - Steven Runciman, A History of the Crusades, vol. II: The Kingdom of Jerusalem. Cambridge University Press, 1952.
  - Şeşen, R. (2009). Selahadin-i Eyyubi. In TDV İslâm Ansiklopedisi (Vol. 36, pp. 337–340). TDV İslâm Araştırmaları Merkezi.
