= Battle of al-Fule =

Battle in 1183 in the Holy Land

Coordinates: 32.6°N 35.3°E

- Part of the Crusades
Date	30 September – 6 October, 1183
Location	Kibbutz Merhavia in the Jezreel Valley, about 8 kilometres (5.0 mi) southeast of present-day Afula, Israel
Result	Inconclusive

Belligerents
Kingdom of Jerusalem	Ayyubid Sultanate

Commanders and leaders
Guy of Lusignan	Saladin

Strength
18,000 (campaign) 1,300–1,500 knights 1,500 turcopoles 15,000 infantry	Unknown

Casualties and losses
Unknown	Unknown

In the campaign and Battle of al-Fule (in Crusader terms La Fève, Latin Castrum Fabe), a Crusader force led by Guy of Lusignan skirmished with Saladin's Ayyubid army for more than a week in September and October 1183. The fighting ended on 6 October with Saladin being forced to withdraw.

== Background ==
In May 1182, Saladin invaded the Kingdom of Jerusalem by way of Eilat, the Transjordan and Galilee. During the summer, he was successfully resisted by King Baldwin IV of Jerusalem in the campaign and Battle of Belvoir Castle; however, the Crusader lands were badly damaged by Saracen raiders. By September 1183, Baldwin, crippled by leprosy, could no longer function as monarch. Guy of Lusignan, who had married Baldwin's sister Sibylla of Jerusalem in 1180, was appointed regent.

== Campaign ==
On August 24, 1183, Saladin returned to Damascus, having conquered Aleppo and several cities in Mesopotamia for his empire. In September, he mounted a major invasion of the Kingdom of Jerusalem. Crossing the Jordan River, the Ayyubid host plundered the abandoned town of Baisan. Continuing west, up the Jezreel Valley, Saladin established his army near some springs about 8 km southeast of al-Fule. At the same time, the Muslim leader sent out numerous columns to damage as much property as possible. The raiders destroyed the villages of Jenin and Afrabala, attacked the monastery on Mount Tabor and wiped out a contingent from Kerak that was trying to join the Crusader field army.

Expecting an attack, Guy of Lusignan mustered the Crusader host at La Sephorie. When intelligence reports detected Saladin's invasion route, Guy marched the field army to the small castle of La Fève (al-Fule). His army was swollen by pilgrims and Italian sailors to a size of 1,300–1,500 knights, 1,500 turcopoles and over 15,000 infantry. This was said to be the largest Latin army assembled "within living memory."

== Battle ==
The Frankish army advanced in its usual fashion toward the water points at Ain Jalut (site of a decisive Muslim victory over the Mongols in 1260) and Tubania (Ain Tuba'un). The exact formation cannot be reconstructed, except that the infantry spearmen and bowmen kept the Turkish horse archers at a respectable distance while the mounted knights launched local charges to drive away any Saracens who approached too closely. Muslim chroniclers mention how Saladin's Mamluks led by Jorduk an-Nuri and Jawili were faced with an unexpected crusader attack, but they fortified themselves at the base of a mountain and caused the crusaders to retire.

The Muslims harassed them with archery and constantly renewed attacks; these were on occasions pressed home to an extent which provoked the Franks to counter-attacks to clear their lines. As in 1111 and 1182 the Franks executed a fighting march which never quite became a pitched battle.

Unable to halt his enemies or to provoke them to fight a pitched battle, Saladin withdrew his army from the springs and moved downstream. The Latin army camped around the springs and remained passive for eight days, refusing battle. The Saracens tried to incite the Franks into an attack while intercepting the Crusaders' supply convoys. Since the local Crusaders brought provisions for only three days while the pilgrims and the sailors brought none, the supply situation soon became critical. By great luck, the Latin soldiers found quantities of fish at Ain Tuba'un and this prevented them from starving until some food convoys got through the Ayyubid blockade.

Saladin then moved toward Mount Tabor, hoping to lure the Franks into an ambush. Instead, Guy retreated to La Fève. During this move, the Ayyubid army quickly returned and pounced on the Crusaders again, but they were unable to halt or disrupt the march. Saladin, also short of supplies, concluded the campaign. At this, Guy marched back to his main base at La Sephorie.

== Aftermath ==
Following long-standing Crusader policy, Guy successfully thwarted Saladin's invasion by preventing him from capturing any strongholds and by keeping the field army intact. But, as in 1182, the Saracen raiders caused extensive damage to crops and villages. Guy was harshly criticized by some for failing to fight a major battle when in command of such a large host. Others, mostly native barons such as Raymond III of Tripoli, supported his cautious strategy. They pointed out that Saladin's army was drawn up on rough ground, unsuitable for a Frankish heavy cavalry charge. Soon after this battle, Guy lost his position as regent.

The next time Guy commanded a major Crusader army, he was reminded how severely he was criticized for avoiding battle in 1183. On that occasion, he initiated an aggressive move that resulted in total disaster for him at the Battle of Hattin in 1187.

== For succession of related campaigns see also ==
- 1177: Battle of Montgisard
- 1179: Battle of Banias
- 1179: Battle of Marj Ayyun
- 1179: Battle of Jacob's Ford
- 1182: Battle of Belvoir Castle
- 1187: Battle of Cresson
- 1187: Battle of Hattin

== Bibliography ==
- Reston, James, Jr. Warriors of God. Knopf Doubleday Publishing Group, 2007. ISBN 030743012X
- Smail, R. C. Crusading Warfare 1097–1193. New York: Barnes & Noble Books, (1956) 1995. ISBN 1-56619-769-4
- Stevenson, W (1907). The Crusaders in the East: a brief history of the wars of Islam with the Latins in Syria during the twelfth and thirteenth centuries. Cambridge University Press.
