= Battle of Belvoir Castle =

Battle in 1182 in the Holy Land

- Part of the Crusades
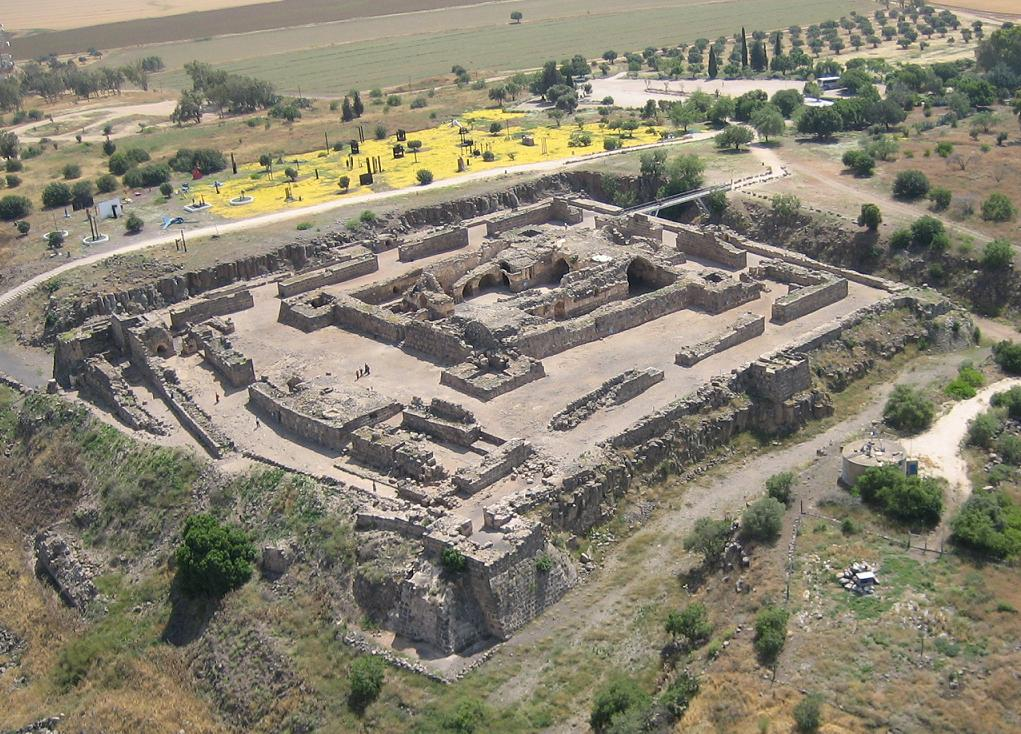
- The Ruins of the Crusader Belvoir Castle
Date	15 July 1182
Location	Belvoir Castle, Kingdom of Jerusalem
Result	Inconclusive

Belligerents
Kingdom of Jerusalem	Ayyubid Dynasty

Commanders and leaders
Baldwin IV of Jerusalem; Balian of Ibelin; Baldwin II of Ramla; Hugh II of Saint Omer	Saladin; Farrukh Shah; Gökböri; Bektimur

Casualties and losses
	Heavy

The Battle of Belvoir Castle, also called the Battle of Le Forbelet, was a part of Saladin's campaign in May — August 1182 against the Crusaders. Crusader forces led by King Baldwin IV of Jerusalem battled with Ayyubid forces from Egypt commanded by Saladin. Saladin took action in Damascus on June 11, 1182, together with his regent Farrukh Shah. Entering Palestine from the south of Tiberias, Saladin encountered the Crusader army coming from Transjordan near Belvoir Castle.

The theatre of operations included Ayla, Transjordan, Galilee and Beirut.

== Background ==
Saladin was appointed commander of the Syrian troops and vizier of the Fatimid caliph in Egypt in 1169 and established the Ayyubid Dynasty soon after. He slowly began extending his dominion over Muslim emirates in Syria formerly held by Nur ad-Din. In 1177, Saladin mounted a major invasion of the Kingdom of Jerusalem from Egypt and was defeated by Baldwin IV of Jerusalem (the "Leper King") at the Battle of Montgisard. Henceforth, the Muslim managed to overcome the young Crusader King’s military talents on a couple of occasions. In 1179, Saladin thoroughly defeated Baldwin IV at the Battle of Marj Ayyun and at the Siege of Jacob’s Ford in the Kingdom of Jerusalem.

In 1180, Saladin arranged a truce between himself and two Christian leaders, King Baldwin IV of Jerusalem and Raymond III of Tripoli to prevent bloodshed. But two years later, in 1182, the lord of the Transjordan fief of Kerak, Reynald of Châtillon, ruthlessly attacked Muslim caravans passing through his lands on their way for pilgrimage, breaking pacts for the safe passage of pilgrims. Resenting this violation of the truce, Saladin immediately assembled his army and prepared to strike, devastating the enemy.

== Campaign ==
On 11 May 1182 Saladin left Egypt and led his army north toward Damascus via Ayla on the Red Sea. As he moved north, his army entered lands belonging to the fiefs of Montreal (Shobak) and Kerak. Saladin encamped at Jerba and launched raids on Montreal, which did great damage to the crops. At a council of war, the Crusader princes pondered two courses of action. They could move across the Jordan River to protect the exposed fiefs. Raymond III of Tripoli argued against this strategy, saying that would leave too few soldiers to protect the Kingdom of Jerusalem. The aggressive Baldwin IV overruled Raymond III and the Crusader army moved to Petra in the Jordan, thus defending the lands of his vassal.

Meanwhile, Saladin's nephew, Farrukh Shah, led a force from Damascus to ravage the now-undefended Christian Principality of Galilee. In this destructive raid, the emirs of Bosra, Baalbek and Homs and their followers joined Farrukh. Before returning to Damascus, the raiders seized the cave castle of Habis Jaldak in the Yarmuk Valley from its weak Frankish garrison.

Out in the Transjordan, the main armies still faced each other. A Frankish plan was proposed to occupy the water points, thus forcing Saladin into the desert, but the Crusaders were unable to carry this out. The Muslim commander moved north and reached Damascus on 22 June. The Crusaders recrossed the Jordan into Galilee and concentrated their army at La Sephorie, six miles northwest of Nazareth.

After a three-week breathing spell, Saladin marched out of the Damascus on 11 July and advanced to Al-Quhwana on the southern shore of the Sea of Galilee. From there he sent forces to raid the Jordan Valley, Grand Gerin (Jenin) and the district of St Jean d'Acre. One raiding column attacked Bethsan but was driven off. Saladin took his main army, crossed to the west side of the Jordan and moved south along the high ground.

== Battle ==
As soon as reconnaissance patrols revealed the Muslim leader's maneuver, the Frankish leaders determined to move their field army into close contact with Saladin's army. After adding reinforcements by stripping nearby castles of most of their garrisons, the Crusader army marched to Tiberias then turned south. In the vicinity of Belvoir Castle (Arabic name: Kaukab al-Hawa), Baldwin's men spent the night in their closely guarded camp. The next morning, the Ayyubid army confronted the Crusaders.

The Franks advanced in their usual formation when in contact with their enemies. The infantry marched in close order, with the spearmen guarding against direct attack and archers keeping the Saracens at a distance. Shielded by the footmen, the cavalry conformed to the pace of the infantry, ready to drive back their enemies with controlled charges. The Crusaders had successfully used this method of fighting in the Battle of Shaizar (1111) and the Battle of Bosra (1147).

For their part, Saladin's soldiers tried to disrupt the Crusader formation by raining arrows from their horse archers, by partial attacks and by feigned retreats. "It is likely that from time to time the Turks came to close quarters, and this has caused some writers to refer to the action as a battle. It is more probable that although there were short episodes in which there was hard fighting, there was no pitched engagement." On this occasion, the Franks could neither be tempted into fighting a pitched battle nor stopped. Unable to make an impression on the Crusader Host, Saladin broke off the running battle and returned to Damascus.

== Aftermath ==
Consensus among historians label the result of the battle as inconclusive. Saladin was not finished yet. He had arranged for an Egyptian fleet to attack Beirut. As soon as his scouts had spotted the fleet from the Lebanese mountains, Saladin left Damascus, marched through the Munaitra Pass and laid siege to Beirut. At the same time, a force from Egypt raided the southern part of the Kingdom of Jerusalem, doing further local damage. Baldwin IV recalled his army to La Sephorie, then marched to Tyre. From there he appropriated shipping and organized an attempt to relieve the port of Beirut by both land and sea. When Saladin heard of these efforts, he raised the siege and destroyed the attempts in August 1182.

The tireless Saladin spent the next twelve months campaigning in Syria and Mesopotamia, adding Aleppo and a number of other cities to his growing empire. He would invade the Kingdom of Jerusalem again in September 1183. Free of his adversary, in October 1182, Baldwin IV of Jerusalem recovered Habis Jaldak in the Transjordan. In December 1182, Raymond III of Tripoli launched a raid in the same area and King Baldwin IV took a mounted force within a few miles of Damascus. But these were mere pinpricks. Not long afterward, Baldwin became completely incapacitated by leprosy and was forced to appoint his sister Sibylla's husband Guy of Lusignan as regent.

The Crusaders kept their enemies from capturing any strongholds and kept their field army intact, so they succeeded in their strategic purpose. But Saladin's raiders managed to inflict great damage on the countryside. Frankish overlords depended on the rents of their tenants, but these could not be collected if the crops were ruined. Without money, the lords could not pay their soldiers. Therefore, constant devastations would ultimately reduce the Kingdom of Jerusalem to a state of helplessness.

Saladin forced the Crusaders into a cruel dilemma. They could concentrate their field army to resist the Muslim main army. Or, they could guard against damaging raids. They could not do both because their military power was limited. "A single mistake on the part of a Frankish commander could lose the field army, the fortresses, and with them the whole Kingdom of Jerusalem." This finally happened in 1187 at the Battle of Hattin. First, the campaign and the Battle of Al-Fule would be fought.

== Related battles ==
- 1177: Battle of Montgisard
- 1179: Battle of Banias
- 1179: Battle of Marj Ayyun
- 1179: Battle of Jacob's Ford
- 1183: Battle of Al-Fule
- 1183: Siege of Kerak
- 1187: Battle of Cresson
- 1187: Battle of Hattin
- 1187: Siege of Jerusalem
- 1187: Siege of Tyre

== Bibliography ==
- Beeler, John. Warfare in Feudal Europe, 730–1200. Ithaca, New York: Cornell University, 1971. ISBN 0-8014-9120-7
- Hamilton, Bernard (2000). The Leper King and His Heirs: Baldwin IV and the Crusader Kingdom of Jerusalem. Cambridge University Press. ISBN 9780521017473.
- Smail, R. C. Crusading Warfare, 1097–1193. New York: Barnes & Noble Books, (1956) 1995. ISBN 1-56619-769-4
- William, Archbishop of Tyre (1943). A History of Deeds Done Beyond the Sea. Vol. Two. Translated by Babcock, Emily Atwater; Krey, A.C. Columbia University Press.
