= Abu Sulayman Da'ud =

12th-century Arab Christian physician

Abu Sulayman Da'ud ibn Abi al-Muna ibn Abi Faris (in other sources: Abu Sulayman Dawud ibn Abi l-Muna ibn Abi Fanah; Arabic: أبو سليمان داود بن أبي المنى بن أبي فانة) was a 12th-century Arab Christian physician and astrologer who served at the royal courts of Fatimid Egypt and the Kingdom of Jerusalem.

Abu Sulayman was an Eastern Christian. He was born to Christian parents in Jerusalem, then part of the Latin East ruled by the Franks. The Franks were also Christians but did not speak Arabic well, and so many native Christians regarded the neighboring Muslim rulers as more approachable.

Abu Sulayman moved to Egypt to serve the last Fatimid caliphs. He became renowned for his skills in medicine and astrology. He particularly excelled in medical theory. The Frankish King Amalric invaded Egypt in 1163, 1164, and 1167. During his campaigns in Egypt, Amalric sought medical help, which historian Malcolm Barber says must have been prompted by the illness of the king's young son, Baldwin IV. Amalric became impressed with Abu Sulayman's skill and requested his service. With the permission of the Fatimid caliph al-Adid, Abu Sulayman moved to Jerusalem with his five sons. It is not known whether this occurred in 1163, 1164, or 1167; historian Ann Zimo believes 1167 to be the most likely date because the caliph was involved in a treaty signed in that year.

Back in Jerusalem, Abu Sulayman treated King Amalric's son, Baldwin IV, who had contracted leprosy. No diagnosis was made during Baldwin IV's childhood because there were no visible symptoms yet and leprosy was much stigmatized, yet the boy was losing sensation in his right arm. Abu Sulayman served at the royal court until he retired to a monastery. Four of Abu Sulayman's sons became physicians as well. One of them, al-Muhadhdhab Abu Sa'id, succeeded Abu Sulayman as King Amalric's physician. The fifth son, al-Faris Abu al-Khair, grew up with the disabled prince and taught him to ride a horse using only his knees. In 1174 Baldwin IV became king of Jerusalem, and Abu al-Khair entered his service.

As an astrologer Abu Sulayman had Abu al-Khair deliver a message to the Egyptian ruler Saladin, of the new Ayyubid dynasty, to assure him that he would conquer Jerusalem. Jerusalem fell to Saladin in 1187, and Saladin increased the family's salaries. Abu Sulayman then returned to Egypt, where he stayed until his death. His four physician sons built successful careers under Saladin's successors in Egypt and in Syria.
