= Battle of Hattin =

1187 Saladin victory over the Crusaders

- Part of the Crusades
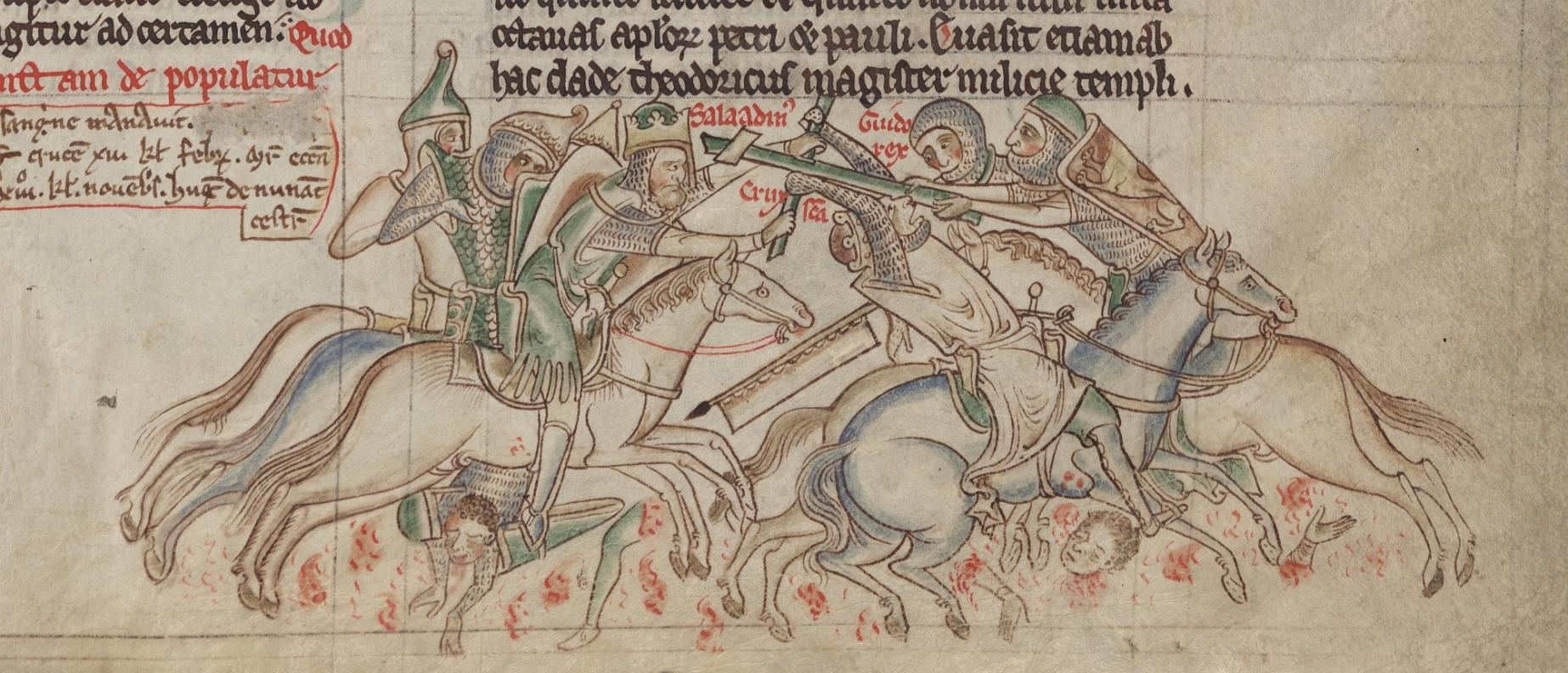
- The Battle of Hattin, from a 13th-century manuscript of the Chronica Majora depicting the capture of the True Cross by Saladin.
Date	3–4 July 1187
Location	Horns of Hattin, Galilee 32°48′13″N 35°26′40″E
Result	Ayyubid victory

Belligerents
Kingdom of Jerusalem; County of Tripoli; Knights Templar; Principality of Antioch; Knights Hospitaller; Order of St. Lazarus; Order of Mountjoy	Ayyubid Sultanate of Egypt

Commanders and leaders
Guy of Lusignan (POW); Raynald of Châtillon (POW) (executed); Humphrey IV of Toron; Aimery of Lusignan; Reginald of Sidon; Joscelin III of Edessa; Balian of Ibelin; Raymond III of Tripoli; Gerard de Rideford (POW); Garnier de Nablus; Raymond of Antioch	Saladin; Muzaffar ad-Din Gökböri; Al-Muzaffar Umar; Al-Adil I Al-Afdal ibn Salah ad-Din

Strength
18,000–20,000 men; 1,200 knights; 3,000 men-at-arms; 500 turcopoles; 15,000 infantry	20,000–40,000 men; 12,000 regular cavalry

Casualties and losses
Most of the army 200 captured knights executed Captured turcopoles executed Captured infantrymen enslaved	Light, mostly spearmen and some archers
- Location of the battle site on a map of Historical Palestine and modern State of Israel

The Battle of Hattin took place on 4 July 1187, between the Crusader states of the Levant and the forces of the Ayyubid Sultanate of Egypt, led by Sultan Saladin. It is also known as the Battle of the Horns of Hattin, due to the shape of the nearby extinct volcano of that name.

The Muslim armies under Saladin captured or killed the vast majority of the Crusader forces, removing their capability to wage war. As a direct result of the battle, Muslims once again became the pre-eminent military power in the Holy Land, re-capturing Jerusalem and most of the other Crusader-held cities and castles. These Christian defeats prompted the Third Crusade, which began two years after the Battle of Hattin.

== Location ==
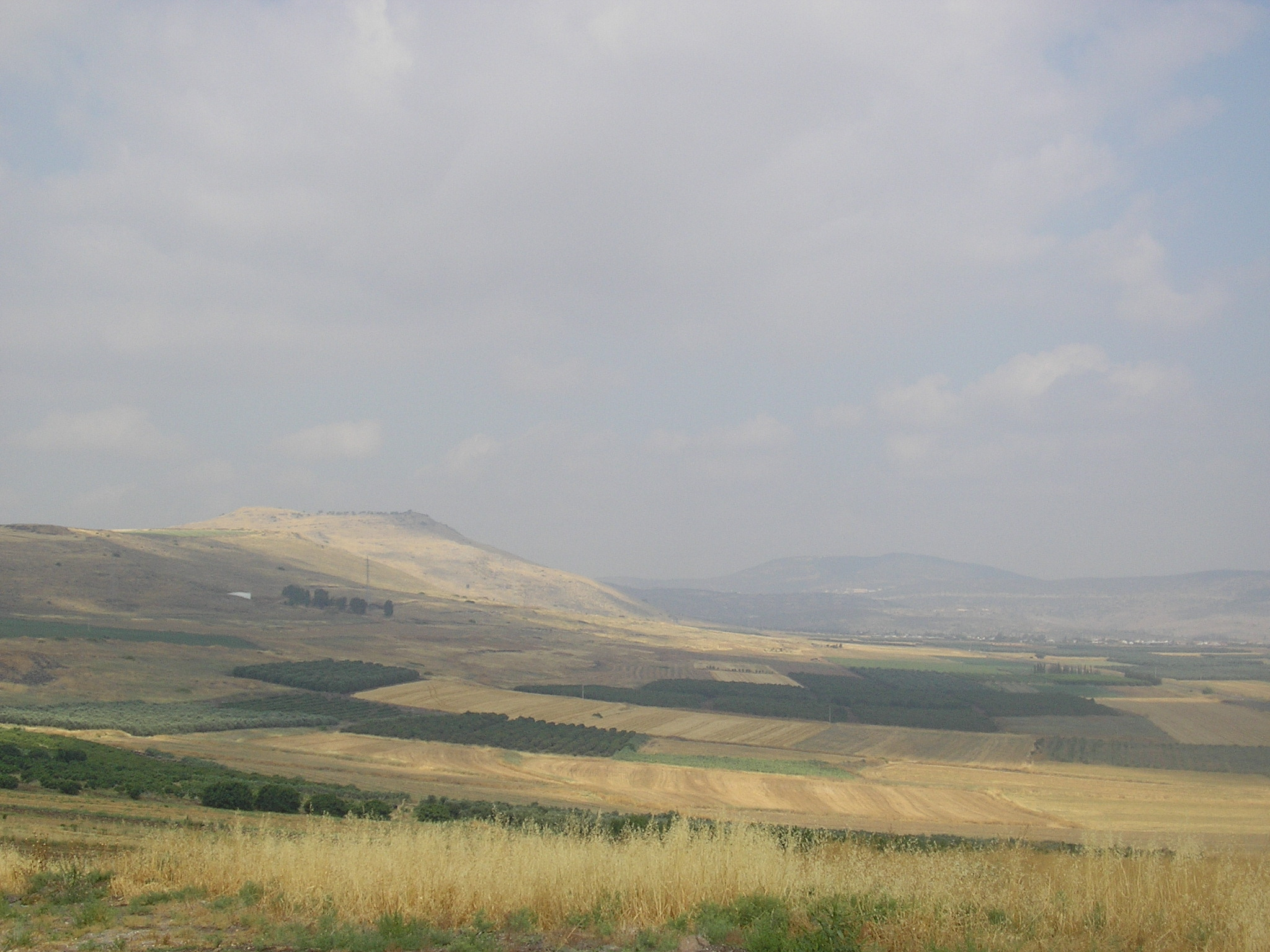
Horns of Hattin, 2005, as viewed from the east

The battle took place near Tiberias in present-day Israel. The battlefield, near the village of Hittin, had as its chief geographic feature a double hill (the "Horns of Hattin") beside a pass through the northern mountains between Tiberias and the road from Acre to the east. The Roman road, known to the Arabs as Darb al-Hawarnah, served as the main east–west passage between the Jordan fords, the Sea of Galilee and the Mediterranean coast.

== Background ==
Guy of Lusignan became king of Jerusalem in 1186, in right of his wife, Sibylla, after the death of her son Baldwin V. The Kingdom of Jerusalem was divided between the "court faction" of Guy, consisting of Sibylla and relative newcomers to the kingdom such as Raynald of Châtillon, Gerard of Ridefort and the Knights Templar; versus the "nobles' faction", led by Raymond III of Tripoli, who had been a regent for the child-king Baldwin V and had opposed Guy's succession. Raymond III of Tripoli had supported the claim of Sibylla's half-sister Isabella and Isabella's husband, Humphrey IV of Toron, and led the rival faction to the court party. Open warfare was prevented only by Humphrey of Toron swearing allegiance to Guy, which ended the succession dispute. The Muslim chronicler Ali ibn al-Athir claimed that Raymond was in a "state of open rebellion" against Guy.

In the background of those divisions, Saladin had become vizier of Egypt in 1169 and had taken Damascus in 1174 and Aleppo in 1183. He controlled the entire southern and eastern flanks of the crusader states and united his subjects under Sunni Islam, convincing them that he would wage holy war to push the Christian Franks from Jerusalem. Saladin often made strategic truces with the Franks when he needed to deal with political problems in the Muslim world, and one such truce was made in 1185.

It was rumoured by the Franks that Raymond III of Tripoli had made an agreement with Saladin under which Saladin would make him King of Jerusalem in return for peace. That rumour was echoed by Ibn al Athir, whether that was true is unclear. Raymond III was certainly reluctant to engage in battle with Saladin.

In 1187 Raynald of Châtillon raided a Muslim Hajj caravan while the truce with Saladin was still in place. Saladin swore that he would kill Raynald for violating the truce, and he sent his son Al-Afdal and the emir Gökböri to raid the Frankish lands surrounding Acre. Gerard de Ridefort and the Templars engaged Gökböri in the Battle of Cresson in May 1187 and were heavily defeated. The Templars lost around 150 knights and 300 foot-soldiers, who had made up a great part of the military of Jerusalem. Jonathan Phillips states that "the damage to Frankish morale and the scale of the losses should not be underestimated in contributing towards the defeat at Hattin".

In July, Saladin laid siege to Tiberias, where Raymond III's wife, Eschiva of Bures, was trapped. In spite of that, Raymond argued that Guy should not engage Saladin in battle and that Saladin could not hold Tiberias because his troops would not stand to be away from their families for so long. The Knights Hospitaller also advised Guy not to provoke Saladin.

Gerard de Ridefort however advised Guy to advance against Saladin, and Guy took his advice. Norman Housley suggests that that was because "the minds of both men had been so poisoned by the political conflict 1180-1187 that they could only see Raymond's advice as designed to bring them personal ruin" and also because he had spent Henry II of England's donations in calling the army and was reluctant to disband it without a battle. That was a gamble on Guy's part, as he had left only a few knights to defend the city of Jerusalem.

== Siege of Tiberias ==
In late May, Saladin assembled the largest army he had ever commanded on the Golan Heights, around 40,000 men, including about 12,000 regular cavalry. He inspected his forces at Tell-Ashtara before crossing the River Jordan on 30 June. Saladin had unexpectedly gained the alliance of the Druze community based in Sarahmul led by Jamal ad-Din Hajji, whose father, Karama, was a longtime ally of Nur ad-Din Zangi. The city of Sarahmul had been sacked by the Crusaders on various occasions and according to Jamal ad-Din Hajji the Crusaders had even manipulated the Assassins into killing his three elder brothers. Saladin's army was organised as a centre and two wings: Gökböri commanded the left of the army, Saladin himself commanded the centre and his nephew, Al-Muzaffar Umar (Taki ad-Din), the right.

The opposing Crusader army gathered at La Saphorie, a well-watered position with a small castle, which had previously served as a mustering point in the event of Muslim intrusion from the east. On this occasion, the Crusader force consisted of around 18,000–20,000 men, including 1,200 knights from Jerusalem and Tripoli and 50 from Antioch. Though the army was smaller than Saladin's, it was still larger than those usually mustered by the Crusaders. The levy of those who owed feudal service was extended, on this occasion of extreme threat, to include a call to arms of all able-bodied men in the kingdom.

After reconciling, Raymond and Guy met at Acre with the bulk of the Crusader army. According to some European sources, aside from the knights there were a greater number of lighter cavalry and perhaps 10,000 foot soldiers, supplemented by crossbowmen from the Italian merchant fleet, and a large number of mercenaries (including indigenous Turcopoles) hired with money donated to the kingdom by Henry II, King of England. The army's standard was the relic of the True Cross, carried by the Bishop of Acre, who was sent on behalf of the ailing Patriarch Heraclius.

Saladin decided to lure Guy into moving his field army away from his secure fortified encampment, located by the springs at La Saphorie (an important local source of water). He calculated the Crusaders could be defeated more easily in a field battle than by besieging their fortifications. On 2 July Saladin personally led an assault on Raymond's fortress of Tiberias, while the main Muslim army remained at Kafr Sabt. The garrison at Tiberias tried to bribe Saladin to leave the castle undisturbed, but he refused. Within a day, one of the fortress' towers was mined and collapsed. Saladin's troops stormed the breach, killing some of the opposing force and taking prisoners. Raymond's wife Eschiva of Bures held out with the surviving Frankish troops in the citadel.

As the Muslim troops began to construct a second mine to attack the citadel on 3 July, Saladin received news that Guy was moving the Frankish army east. The Crusaders had taken the bait. Guy's decision to leave La Saphorie was the result of a Crusader war council held on the night of 2 July. Records of this meeting are biased due to personal feuds among the Franks, but it seems Raymond argued that a march from Acre to Tiberias was exactly what Saladin wanted, while La Saphorie was a strong position for the Crusaders to defend. Raymond also claimed Guy should not worry about Tiberias, which Raymond held personally and was willing to give up for the safety of the kingdom. In response to this argument, and despite their reconciliation (internal court politics remaining strong), Raymond was accused of cowardice by Gerard and Raynald. This led Guy to resolve on an immediate counter-attack against Saladin at Tiberias.

== Battle ==
Movement of troops to the battle (Crusader Kingdom of Jerusalem in black and Muslim in green). Fontaine- (Spring). Djebel- (Mount). Tiberiade- (Tiberias). Lac de Tiberiade- (Lake Tiberias). Cafsarsset- (Kafr Sabt).

On 3 July the Frankish army started out towards Tiberias, harassed constantly by Muslim archers. They passed the Springs of Turan, which were entirely insufficient to provide the army with water. At midday, Raymond of Tripoli decided that the army would not reach Tiberias by nightfall, and he and Guy agreed to change the course of the march and veer to the left in the direction of the Springs of Kafr Hattin, only 6 miles (9.7 km) away. From there they could march down to Tiberias the following day. The Muslims positioned themselves between the Frankish army and the water so that the Franks were forced to pitch camp overnight on the arid plateau near the village of Meskenah. The Muslims surrounded the camp so closely that "a cat could not have escaped". According to Ibn al Athir, the Franks were "despondent, tormented by thirst" whilst Saladin's men were jubilant in anticipation of their victory.

Throughout the night, the Muslims further demoralized the crusaders by praying, singing, beating drums, showing symbols, and chanting. They set fire to the dry grass, making the crusaders' throats even drier. The Crusaders were thirsty, demoralized and exhausted. The Muslim army, by contrast, had a caravan of camels bring goatskins of water up from Lake Tiberias (now known as the Sea of Galilee).

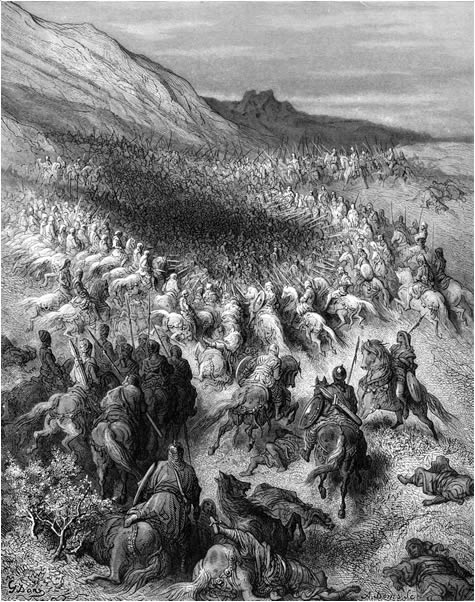
Battle of Hattin (Gustave Doré)

On the morning of 4 July the crusaders were blinded by smoke from the fires set by Saladin's forces. The Franks came under fire from Muslim mounted archers from the division commanded by Gökböri, who had been resupplied with 400 loads of arrows that had been brought up during the night. Gerard and Raynald advised Guy to form battle lines and attack, which was done by Guy's brother Amalric. Raymond led the first division with Raymond of Antioch, the son of Bohemund III of Antioch, while Balian and Joscelin III of Edessa formed the rearguard.

Thirsty and demoralized, the crusaders broke camp and changed direction for the springs of Hattin, but their ragged approach was attacked by Saladin's army, which blocked the route forward and any possible retreat. Count Raymond launched two charges in an attempt to break through to the water supply at Lake Tiberias. The second of these enabled him to reach the lake and make his way to Tyre.

After Raymond escaped, Guy's position was now even more desperate. Most of the Christian infantry had effectively deserted by fleeing en masse onto the Horns of Hattin, where they played no further part in the battle. Overwhelmed by thirst and wounds, many of Guy's soldiers were killed on the spot without resistance while the remainder were taken prisoner. Their plight was such that five of Raymond's knights went over to the Muslim leaders to beg that they be mercifully put to death. Guy attempted to pitch the tents again to block the Muslim cavalry. The Christian knights and mounted serjeants were disorganized, but still fought on.

Now the crusaders were surrounded and, despite three desperate charges on Saladin's position, were broken up and defeated. An eyewitness account of this is given by Saladin's 17-year-old son, al-Afdal. It is quoted by Muslim chronicler Ibn al-Athir:

When the king of the Franks [Guy] was on the hill with that band, they made a formidable charge against the Muslims facing them, so that they drove them back to my father [Saladin]. I looked towards him and he was overcome by grief and his complexion pale. He took hold of his beard and advanced, crying out "Give the lie to the Devil!" The Muslims rallied, returned to the fight, and climbed the hill. When I saw that the Franks withdrew, pursued by the Muslims, I shouted for joy, "We have beaten them!" But the Franks rallied and charged again like the first time and drove the Muslims back to my father. He acted as he had done on the first occasion and the Muslims turned upon the Franks and drove them back to the hill. I again shouted, "We have beaten them!" but my father rounded on me and said, "Be quiet! We have not beaten them until that tent [Guy's] falls." As he was speaking to me, the tent fell. The sultan dismounted, prostrated himself in thanks to God Almighty, and wept for joy.

== Surrender of crusaders ==
Prisoners after the battle included Guy, his brother Amalric II, Raynald de Chatillon, William V of Montferrat, Gerard de Ridefort, Humphrey IV of Toron, Hugh of Jabala, Plivain of Botron, Hugh III Embriaco, and other barons of the Kingdom of Jerusalem.

Guy of Lusignan and Raynald of Chatillon were brought to Saladin's tent. Saladin offered Guy water, which was a sign in Muslim culture that the prisoner would be spared, but Guy was unaware of that. Guy passed the goblet to Raynald, but Saladin struck it from his hands and said, "I did not ask this evil man to drink, and he would not save his life by doing so". He then charged Raynald with breaking the truce.

Some reports, such as that of Baha al-Din, claim that Saladin himself then executed Raynald with a single stroke of his sword. Others record that Saladin struck Raynald as a sign to his bodyguards to behead him. Guy assumed that he would also be beheaded, but Saladin assured him that "kings do not kill kings."

== Aftermath ==
=== Crusader battle losses ===
The True Cross was supposedly fixed upside down on a lance and sent to Damascus.

The Crusader king, Guy of Lusignan, was taken to Damascus as a prisoner and granted release in 1188, while the other noble captives were eventually ransomed.

After executing Raynald of Chatillon, Saladin ordered that the other captive barons be spared and treated humanely. All 200 of the Templar and Hospitaller Knights taken prisoner were executed on Saladin's orders, with the exception of the Grand Master of the Temple. The executions were by decapitation. Saint Nicasius, a Knight Hospitaller later venerated as a Roman Catholic martyr, is said to have been one of the victims. Imad ed-Din, Saladin's secretary, wrote:

Saladin ordered that they should be beheaded, choosing to have them dead rather than in prison. With him was a whole band of scholars and sufis and a certain number of devout men and ascetics; each begged to be allowed to kill one of them, and drew his sword and rolled back his sleeve. Saladin, his face joyful, was sitting on his dais; the unbelievers showed black despair.

Captured turcopoles (locally recruited mounted archers employed by the crusader states) were also executed on Saladin's orders. Though the prisoners claimed to be Christians by heritage, Saladin believed the turcopoles to be Christian converts from Islam, which was punishable by death under the form of Islamic jurisprudence followed by the Ayyubid state. Modern historians have corroborated Saladin's belief that the turcopoles in the Ayyubid–Crusader wars were mostly recruited from converted Turks and Arabs.

The rest of the captured knights and soldiers were sold into slavery, and one was reportedly bought in Damascus in exchange for some sandals. The high-ranking Frankish barons captured were held in Damascus and treated well. Some of Saladin's men left the army after the battle, taking lower-ranking Frankish prisoners with them as slaves.

=== Crusader kingdom falls to Saladin ===
On Sunday 5 July Saladin marched the six miles (10km) to Tiberias, and Countess Eschiva surrendered the citadel of the fortress. She was allowed to leave for Tripoli with all of her family, followers, and possessions. Raymond of Tripoli, having escaped the battle, died of pleurisy later in 1187.

In fielding an army of 20,000 men, the Crusaders had reduced the garrisons of their castles and fortified settlements. The heavy defeat at Hattin meant there was little reserve with which to defend against Saladin's forces. Only some 200 knights escaped the battle. The importance of the defeat is demonstrated by the fact that in its aftermath, fifty-two towns and fortifications were captured by Saladin's forces. By mid-September, Saladin had taken Acre, Nablus, Jaffa, Toron, Sidon, Beirut, and Ascalon. Tyre was saved by the arrival of Conrad of Montferrat, resulting in Saladin's siege of Tyre being repulsed with heavy losses. Jerusalem was defended by Queen Sibylla, Latin Patriarch Heraclius of Jerusalem, and Balian, who subsequently negotiated its surrender to Saladin on 2 October.

=== Significance in crusading history ===
According to the chronicler Ernoul, news of the defeat brought to Rome by Joscius, Archbishop of Tyre caused Pope Urban III to die of shock. Urban's successor, Pope Gregory VIII, issued the bull Audita tremendi calling for a new crusade within days of his election. In England and France, the Saladin tithe was enacted to raise funds for the new crusade. The subsequent Third Crusade did not get underway until 1189, but was a very successful military operation through which many Christian holdings were restored. Nonetheless, Christian control over territories in the Holy Land remained vulnerable for decades until the Battle of La Forbie of 1244, 57 years after the Battle of Hattin, which marked the final collapse of Crusader military power in Outremer.

== See also ==
This is a succession of related campaigns that led up to the Battle of Hattin, on 3–4 July 1187:

- 1177: Battle of Montgisard
- 1179: Battle of Marj Ayyun
- 1179: Battle of Jacob's Ford
- 1182: Battle of Belvoir Castle
- 1183: Battle of Al-Fule
- 1187: Battle of Cresson
