= Battle of Banias =

12th-century conflict in Middle East

- Part of the Crusades
Date	10 April 1179
Location	Banias
Result	Ayyubid victory

Belligerents
Kingdom of Jerusalem	Ayyubid Dynasty

Commanders and leaders
Baldwin IV (WIA); Humphrey II †	Salahuddin Ayyubi

Strength
Unknown	1,000 men

Casualties and losses
Heavy	Unknown

The Battle of Banias was a military engagement between the Ayyubid force and the Crusader force led by King Baldwin IV of Jerusalem. The Ayyubids routed the Crusaders.

== Background ==
After the crushing defeat at the Battle of Montgisard, the Ayyubid sultan, Saladin, retreated to Egypt and remained there for several months, consolidating his position there. In late spring 1178, he returned to Damascus and remained there for the rest of the year. Following up with his victory, Baldwin pushed forward towards Syria and established a fortress on the road to Damascus called Jacob's Ford. Seeing this, Saladin attempted to induce Baldwin to abandon the fort by offering 60,000 and then 100,000 gold pieces, but that didn't happen.

== Battle ==
In the spring of 1179, Baldwin launched an expedition to collect the sheep passing Banias as the seasonal movement of flocks began from the fields of Damascus. Alarmed, Saladin dispatched a force of 1,000 lancers led by Farrukh Shah to see what was happening. On April 10, he suddenly met the crusader forces in a narrow valley in the forest of Banias. The Crusader force was taken by surprise and ambushed; both sides fought fiercely until the Crusader force was routed. Baldwin almost fell prisoner; however, he was saved by Humphrey II of Toron, who managed to hold off the Ayyubids with his bodyguards until the crusader force withdrew. However, Humphrey was mortally wounded in the battle and forced to retreat.

== Aftermath ==
The death of Humphrey was a heavy blow to the Crusaders, as he was respected not only by his fellow crusaders but also by Muslims. Ibn al-Athir describes Humphry:

No words can describe Hunfray; his name was a proverb for bravery and skill in war. He was indeed a plague let loose by God for the chastening of the Moslems.

After his victory, Saladin marched to the fort and laid siege to it; however, after a few days of fierce resistance, Saladin withdrew before Banias and sent raiding parties to Galilee, Sidon, and Beirut. Baldwin marched to meet Saladin but was defeated again at the Battle of Marj Ayyun.

== Sources ==
- Lane-Poole, Stanley (2017). The life of Saladin and the fall of the kingdom of Jerusalem. FV Éditions. ISBN 9791029904271.
- Runcimen, Steven (1952). A history of the Crusades. and the Frankish East, 1100–1187. Cambridge: Cambridge University Press.
- Ibn al-Athir (2003). Mohammad Youssef al-Daqaq (ed.). The Complete History, Volume 10 (in Arabic) (4 ed.). Beirut: Dār al-Kutub al-ʿilmīya.
