= Baldwin IV of Jerusalem =

King of Jerusalem from 1174 to 1185

Baldwin IV
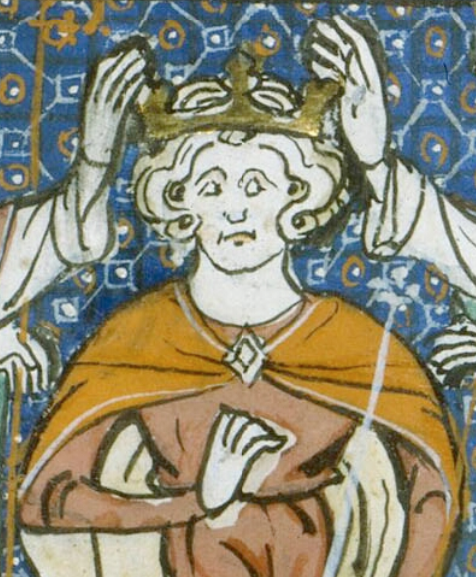

King of Jerusalem
- Reign: 1174–1185
- Coronation: 15 July 1174
- Predecessor: Amalric
- Successor: Baldwin V (as sole king)
- Co-king: Baldwin V (1183–85)
- Regents: Miles of Plancy (1173–74); Raymond III of Tripoli (1174–76); Guy of Lusignan (1183)
- Born: Mid-1161; Kingdom of Jerusalem
- Died: Between March and May 1185 (aged 23–24); Kingdom of Jerusalem
- Burial: Church of the Holy Sepulchre
- House: Anjou
- Father: Amalric of Jerusalem
- Mother: Agnes of Courtenay
- Religion: Roman Catholicism

Baldwin IV (1161–1185), known as the Leper King, was the king of Jerusalem from 1174 until his death in 1185. Baldwin ascended to the throne when he was thirteen despite having leprosy. He made several attempts to curb the increasing power of the Muslim ruler Saladin, though much of his life was marked by infighting amongst the kingdom's nobles. Throughout his reign, and especially at the end of his brief life, he was troubled by his succession, working to select a suitable heir to the throne and prevent a succession crisis. Choosing competent advisers, Baldwin ruled a thriving crusader state, protecting it from Saladin.

Baldwin's parents, King Amalric and Agnes of Courtenay, separated when Baldwin was two. At nine years old, he was sent to be educated by Archbishop William of Tyre. William noticed preliminary symptoms of leprosy, but Baldwin was only diagnosed after he succeeded his father as king. Thereafter, his hands and face became increasingly disfigured. He mastered horse riding despite gradually losing sensation in his extremities and fought in battles until his last years. First, Miles of Plancy ruled the kingdom in Baldwin's name, then Count Raymond III of Tripoli took over until Baldwin reached the age of majority in 1176. Baldwin became closer to his mother and uncle, Agnes and Joscelin of Courtenay, as Agnes returned to court. She had significant influence over her son, his court, and the politics of the kingdom during his reign.

As soon as he assumed government, Baldwin planned an invasion of Egypt, which fell through because of his vassals' uncooperativeness. Leprosy prevented Baldwin from marrying; he hoped to abdicate when his older sister, Sibylla, married William of Montferrat in 1176, but William died the next year. Saladin attacked the kingdom in 1177, but Baldwin and the nobleman Raynald of Châtillon repelled him at Montgisard, earning Baldwin fame. In 1180, to forestall a coup by Count Raymond III of Tripoli and Prince Bohemond III of Antioch, Baldwin had Sibylla marry Guy of Lusignan. However, Guy was opposed by a large fraction of the nobility, and soon permanently impaired his relationship with Baldwin through his insubordination. Although Baldwin wished to abdicate, the internal discord that followed forced him to remain on the throne, as only he was capable of uniting the quarreling nobility.

Baldwin again repelled Saladin in 1182 at the Battle of Le Forbelet, but leprosy rendered him near-incapable in 1183. After Guy's failure to lead, Baldwin disinherited him and had Sibylla's son, Baldwin V, crowned co-king before travelling in a litter to lift Saladin's Siege of Kerak. Because of their refusal to attend court, Baldwin failed to have Sibylla's marriage to Guy annulled and Guy's fief of Ascalon confiscated. In early 1185, he arranged for Raymond to rule as regent for Sibylla's son, dying of a fever before 16 May 1185. Two years after his death, his realm was destroyed by Saladin at the Battle of Hattin.

== Childhood ==
Baldwin was born in mid-1161, probably in Ascalon, but there is no official record of this. His parents were Amalric, then the count of Jaffa and Ascalon, and Agnes of Courtenay, making him the first prince whose parents were both born in the crusader states. He had Armenian great-grandmothers on both sides of his family. Baldwin's godfather was his paternal uncle, King Baldwin III, who joked that his christening present was the Kingdom of Jerusalem. The kingdom and other crusader principalities, though surrounded by Arab Muslim states, were ruled by Franks, French-speaking Catholics who had arrived in the Levant from Western Europe and remained Western in culture. Baldwin III was young and recently married, making a nephew's accession seem unlikely; yet he died childless in 1163. Amalric was his heir, but the nobles of the kingdom were strongly opposed to Amalric's wife, Agnes; the historian Bernard Hamilton suggests that they were likely threatened by the prospect of her increased influence. The High Court forced Amalric to agree to an annulment of his marriage on the grounds of consanguinity in order to be accepted as king. Amalric succeeded in having his and Agnes's children, Sibylla and Baldwin, declared legitimate despite the annulment.

As Agnes remarried soon after the annulment (firstly to Hugh of Ibelin and then to Reynald of Sidon), Baldwin grew up without a mother; Hamilton surmises that she only saw Baldwin on public occasions. He also seldom saw his sister, Sibylla, who was raised in the Convent of Saint Lazarus by their grand-aunt Ioveta. When Baldwin was six, King Amalric married Maria Komnene, who was not close with Baldwin. Queen Maria was an ambitious woman who, in Hamilton's opinion, likely saw Baldwin as an obstacle to her progeny.

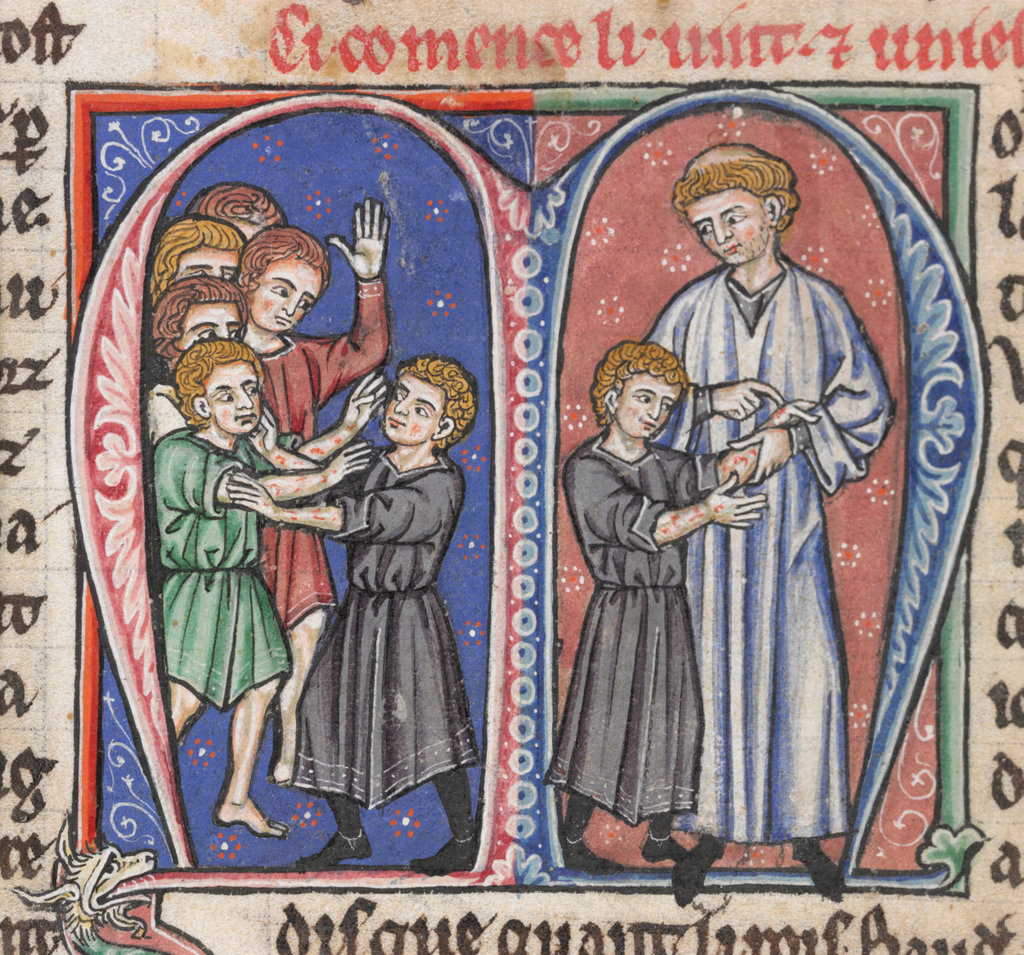
Playmates pinch Baldwin and William of Tyre discovers first symptoms of Baldwin's leprosy, in Estoire d'Eracles, painted in France in the 1250s

To ensure that his son and heir apparent received a good education, King Amalric sent the nine-year-old Baldwin to live with William of Tyre, a sophisticated and well-traveled cleric famed for his learning. William noticed that, unlike other noble children in the playground, Baldwin did not cry when pinched by his peers. After multiple reports of this, William realized that Baldwin could not feel pain in his right arm and grew worried about the boy's health. Amalric hired the Arab physician Abu Sulayman Dawud to treat Baldwin and his relative, Abul'Khair, to teach the boy horse riding, an essential skill for a Frankish nobleman. Having sensation in one hand, Baldwin learned to control his horse using solely his knees, and mastered riding despite this handicap. It was suspected that Baldwin had leprosy, but without visible symptoms, the physicians hesitated to diagnose him because of the stigma and limitations the boy would face; had such a diagnosis been made when he was a child, Baldwin might have been required by law to enter the Order of St Lazarus, a military order composed of affected knights and serjeants.

William said that Baldwin was precocious, determined, and optimistic in the face of his illness as an adolescent. He inherited his father's good looks, body shape, and manner of walking and expressing himself. Baldwin was a quick learner, but stuttered. He enjoyed listening to stories and history lessons. His memory was excellent, and he forgot neither kindness nor slights done to him by others.

In 1169, Amalric started seeking a mature husband for Sibylla so that a capable regent could rule the kingdom in case Amalric died while Baldwin was still a child. Count Stephen I of Sancerre accepted the offer. After his symptoms developed, Baldwin's accession became uncertain and attention turned to Sibylla and Stephen, but their match fell through. In June 1174, Amalric came down with dysentery, and died on 11 July 1174, leaving an underage heir as he had feared might happen.

== Accession ==
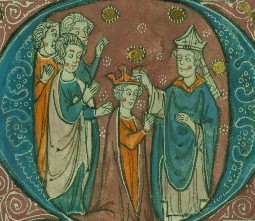
Patriarch Amalric crowns King Baldwin IV, as depicted in late 13th-century edition of the Histoire d'Outre Mer

Upon Amalric's death, the High Court convened to discuss the kingdom's succession. Though Baldwin was not diagnosed, Hamilton believed the High Court must have been aware of the royal physicians' suspicions that Baldwin had contracted leprosy. There was no viable alternative to succeed Amalric, however. Baldwin was the King's only son; Amalric's second marriage had produced two daughters, of which only Isabella survived infancy. Female succession was expressly allowed, but Sibylla was an unmarried adolescent, and Isabella was only two years old. The male candidates, Amalric's cousins Prince Bohemond III of Antioch, Baldwin of Antioch, and Count Raymond III of Tripoli, were politically unsuitable: Bohemond was bound to distant Antioch, Baldwin was in the service of Byzantine Emperor Manuel I Komnenos, and Raymond was virtually a stranger to the barons after nine years spent in Muslim captivity.

After three days of deliberation, Baldwin IV was unanimously chosen, with the expectation that a husband would be found for Sibylla to succeed him if he proved to be affected. The Latin patriarch of Jerusalem, Amalric of Nesle, crowned the young king in the Church of the Holy Sepulchre. Although medieval rulers were typically crowned on Sundays, 15 July 1174 was chosen for Baldwin's coronation instead as it was the 75th anniversary of the First Crusade's successful end to the siege of Jerusalem.

== Regency ==
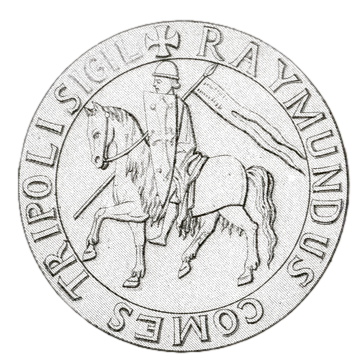
Seal of Raymond III of Tripoli

Until he reached the age of majority (which was 15 in the Kingdom of Jerusalem), Baldwin needed a regent to rule in his name. The government was initially assumed by the seneschal, Miles of Plancy. Shortly thereafter, Count Raymond III of Tripoli arrived in Jerusalem and laid a claim to the regency as the King's closest kinsman. Miles was murdered in October 1174 while trying to extend his hold on the government. With the unanimous support of the bishops and most of the kingdom's noblemen, Raymond was named regent after a two-day debate presided over by the 13-year-old king. No new seneschal was appointed for two years, and so the young and sickly king presided over burdensome High Court meetings when Raymond was away on military duties or in Tripoli.

Baldwin's mother, Agnes, returned to court when Raymond became regent. Historians frequently accuse her of exploiting her son's condition for self-gain; Hamilton notes that contemporary sources, including Baldwin's tutor, William of Tyre, are strongly biased against her. Hamilton believes that Baldwin had no memories of his mother because he grew up without her since the age of two, but that she became devotedly kind to him and he developed a strong attachment to her.

At the beginning of 1175, Saladin, the founder of the Ayyubid Sultanate, laid siege to the Zengid-held city of Aleppo, and the inhabitants of the city wished for the crusaders to carry out a diversion. This was Baldwin's first opportunity to lead in a military campaign. At the end of spring, Baldwin left Jerusalem, crossing Samaria and Galilee. The target was Damascus, whose countryside was pillaged and burned by the crusaders; the operation was successfully repeated in August of the following year. According to historian Pierre Aubé, Baldwin and Raymond III of Tripoli defeated a Damascene army commanded by Saladin's brother, Turan-Shah, at Ain Anjar.

During Raymond's regency, it was confirmed that Baldwin was affected by leprosy. It is not clear from whom he caught it. Medical historian Piers Mitchell concludes that it must have been someone with whom Baldwin had spent a lot of time at a young age, such as a family member, a wet nurse, or another servant, and who did not exhibit easily visible symptoms. Puberty may have accelerated the development of the lepromatous form of the illness, and his condition worsened rapidly. Most severely affected were his extremities and face, which made his subjects feel uneasy when they approached him. Yet, to the surprise of Muslim observers and contrary to the common practice, Baldwin was never segregated. As a leper, he could not marry or expect to have children; it thus became a priority to arrange a marriage for Baldwin's sister and heir presumptive, Sibylla. Raymond's choice was William of Montferrat, cousin of both Holy Roman Emperor Frederick Barbarossa and King Louis VII of France.

== Personal rule ==
=== Planned offensive ===
On the second anniversary of his coronation, 15 July 1176, Baldwin reached the age of majority; Raymond's regency lapsed, and he promptly returned to Tripoli. At the suggestion of his mother, Baldwin appointed her brother, Joscelin, to the office of seneschal and arranged for him to marry a rich heiress, Agnes of Milly. Baldwin was able to trust Joscelin as he was his closest kinsman who had no claim to the throne. This change in government signaled a new Frankish approach to the Egyptian ruler Saladin, who had encircled the crusader states during Raymond's regency by conquering Muslim principalities in Syria. Baldwin did not ratify Raymond's peace treaty with Saladin, firmly agreeing with Joscelin that Saladin's power needed to be curbed.

Map of the Near East in c. 1165. By the time Baldwin IV ascended, the Fatimid Caliphate had been overthrown by Saladin, who advanced into Zengid territory.

As soon as he took over the government, Baldwin began planning a full-scale attack on Egypt with his advisers. He took advantage of Saladin's campaign in Aleppo to lead a raid around Damascus. Despite having sensation in only one hand, he refused to delegate his military duties and took part in fighting. He and his advisers decided to intervene in Saladin's war against the Order of Assassins. On 1 August 1176, Baldwin and Raymond led the armies of Jerusalem and Tripoli, respectively, in a raid of the Beqaa Valley (modern-day Lebanon). They successfully defeated the garrison of Damascus, forcing Saladin to abandon his campaign.

William of Montferrat married Baldwin's sister Sibylla in November 1176 and was made count of Jaffa and Ascalon, but the nobles no longer trusted his cousin Emperor Frederick's ability to aid the kingdom. According to Sicard of Cremona, Baldwin offered to resign the throne to William; if he did, William declined because he knew he lacked the support of the nobility.

To carry out his attacks on Egypt, Baldwin needed naval support. The nobleman Raynald of Châtillon led an embassy to his stepson-in-law, Emperor Manuel I Komnenos, in Constantinople on Baldwin's behalf in the winter of 1176–77. Manuel agreed to take part in the invasion in return for the establishment of Byzantine protectorate over the kingdom and restoration of the Orthodox patriarch, Leontius II, in Jerusalem. Raynald's mission was successful, and Baldwin consented to his marriage with the lady of Transjordan, Stephanie of Milly.

In April 1177, William of Monferrat fell sick in Ascalon. Baldwin visited him and became gravely ill too. William died two months later in June, leaving Sibylla pregnant and Baldwin incapacitated without a deputy ahead of a major war offensive. Baldwin then entrusted the government and military command to Raynald, snubbing the count of Tripoli. Baldwin's first cousin Count Philip I of Flanders arrived in the East in September. He brought to Baldwin financial aid from another cousin, King Henry II of England; Henry was willing to aid him because he and Baldwin both belonged to the Angevin family. Still in sickbed in Ascalon, Baldwin had himself taken back to Jerusalem in a litter and convened a general council, on the advice of which he offered regency to Philip. Philip declined, and Raynald retained his post.

The Byzantines sent a war fleet in preparation of the invasion of Egypt, but to Baldwin's regret, they withdrew because of the uncooperativeness of Philip of Flanders, Bohemond of Antioch, Raymond of Tripoli, and the grand master of the Knights Hospitaller, Roger de Moulins. Saladin's power remained unchecked, and the Byzantine alliance collapsed. Despite the hostility of the Latin patriarch, Amalric of Nesle, Baldwin continued to court the Greek patriarch, Leontius, in hopes that the Byzantines would remain committed to his kingdom.

=== Initial conflicts with Saladin ===
Philip left the Kingdom of Jerusalem with his troops in late October 1177 to help Raymond of Tripoli attack the Muslim-held city of Hama. With the Frankish army in northern Syria, Saladin seized the opportunity to invade Baldwin's kingdom on 18 November. Though still recovering from malaria, Baldwin and Raynald of Châtillon rode to meet Saladin, while the Knights Templar hurried to defend Gaza. Baldwin took his humble host to Ascalon, where in desperation he issued an arrière-ban, summoning all able-bodied men to join the host. He was joined by his uncle Joscelin, his stepfather Reynald of Sidon, Raynald of Châtillon, and Balian and Baldwin of Ibelin.

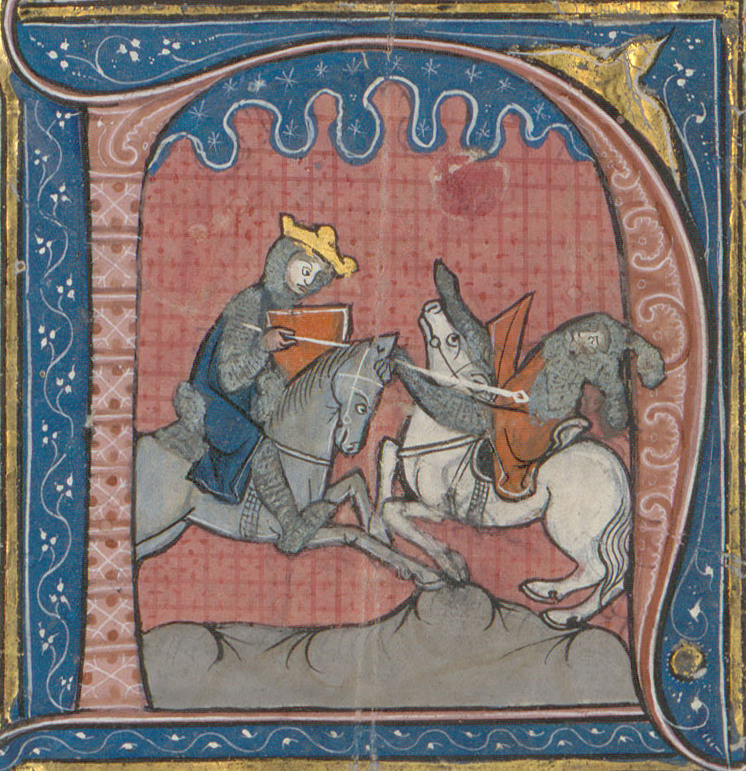
13th-century depiction of Baldwin toppling an enemy at the Battle of Montgisard

Saladin reached Ascalon on 22 November 1177. Baldwin led his troops out to meet him, but seeing how drastically outnumbered he was, he retreated into the city. William of Tyre reported Saladin's strength as 26,000 men, but this number was most likely a great exaggeration. Saladin, seeing the strength in his numbers and concluding that Baldwin's army posed no threat to him, confidently proceeded towards Jerusalem. In the meantime, Baldwin managed to contact the Templars and ordered them to abandon Gaza and join him. With Raynald of Châtillon, he rode out of Ascalon and joined up with the Templars along the coast. Saladin did not anticipate this and did not send any of his men to monitor the city.

On 25 November, Baldwin and Raynald attacked Saladin's dispersed army at Montgisard; the young king was in the forefront, while Raynald directed much of the cavalry. Saladin, who barely survived, suffered a crushing defeat; only a tenth of his army made it back to Egypt, and one of his great-nephews was killed. His army was routed for twelve miles after the battle was lost; Baldwin took part in the fighting until nightfall when the Muslims retreated. He then returned to Jerusalem, where he was welcomed triumphantly. Baldwin's unexpected victory at Montgisard had a major impact on the Christian world, who saw it as a sign from God.

Without enough men to launch an offensive on the retreating Muslims, Baldwin decided to fortify the Damascene frontier. The Templars pressured him to build a castle, Chastellet, on the upper Jordan River, but Baldwin was reluctant to do so because the Franks had promised not to mark that part of the border. After protests of local Muslims, Saladin offered Baldwin 60,000 dinars in exchange for aborting the construction, but Baldwin refused; Saladin then offered Baldwin 100,000 dinars, which he refused again. In 1178, Baldwin hosted the patriarch of the Syriac Orthodox Church, Michael the Syrian, in Jerusalem and won his lasting loyalty to the Frankish cause.

In April 1179, Baldwin intended to round up the sheep passing from Damascus to Banias. Saladin's nephew Farrukh Shah was sent to investigate Baldwin's movement but suddenly ran into him, and the skirmish followed. The elderly but exceptionally able constable, Humphrey II of Toron, sustained fatal wounds while protecting the king, who was deeply saddened by this loss.

A few weeks later in June, another battle took place. Baldwin rode out to intercept Bedouin raids of the Beirut and Sidon. Baldwin and his army marched to the hills of Marj Ayyun, accompanied by Raymond of Tripoli and Odo of St Amand, the Grand Master of the Knights Templar. The crusaders had no difficulty routing Saladin's army and, believing the battle to be won, they let their guard down; Raymond and Odo moved with their knights to an area between Marj Ayyun and the Litani River. Saladin's raiding party then attacked the crusaders by surprise and routed Baldwin's army, defeating the Christians soundly; Baldwin was unhorsed and carried to safety on a knight's back because he could not remount on his own. Many crusaders were taken prisoner, including Odo, Baldwin of Ibelin, and Raymond's stepson Hugh of Saint Omer. Raymond escaped to Tyre, which William of Tyre called "disgraceful" because he left his men behind.

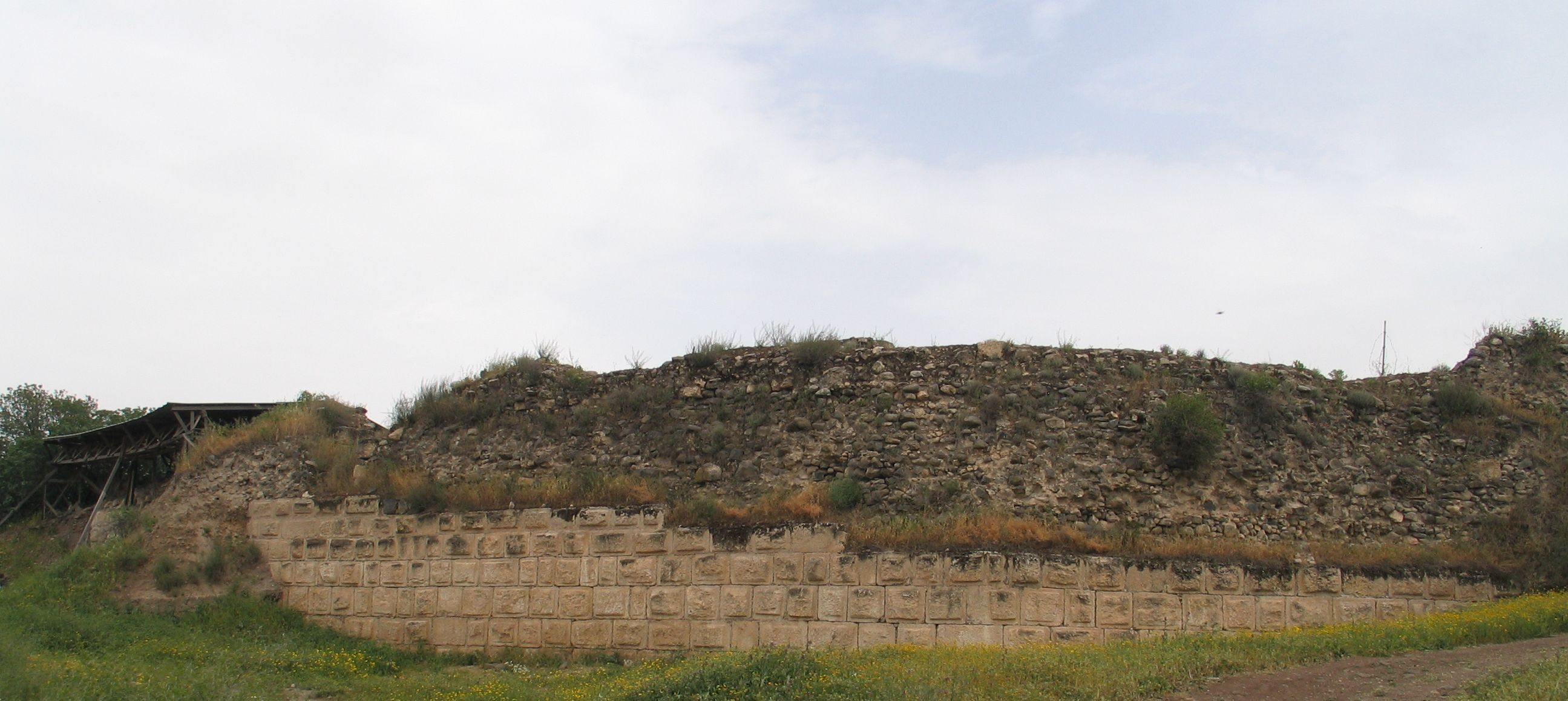
Saladin demolished Baldwin's Le Chastellet fortress after conquering it.

On 24 August 1179, Saladin, who found that the Templars at Le Chastellet posed a serious issue, laid siege to the fortress. His most trusted officers advised a quick and violent assault rather than a regular siege, and the Muslims immediately stormed the outer defences. When Baldwin heard of this, he summoned a host to Tiberias; in the meantime, the Muslims breached the castle's inner walls and captured it on 29 August. The castle fell before the relic of the True Cross could be fetched from Jerusalem to accompany the Christian troops; as Le Chastellet was specifically built to withstand a long siege, the crusaders saw no reason to rush. Saladin remained at the castle for a fortnight, demolishing the building and executing the Christian soldiers there who were not killed in battle.

=== Rise of factions ===
In the winter of 1177–78, the King's widowed sister gave birth to a son, Baldwin, named after the King. In June, a year of official mourning for the child's father, William, concluded, and it became appropriate to seek another husband for Sibylla. Baldwin of Ibelin's suit was well known, but not entertained. His brother, Balian of Ibelin, married King Baldwin's stepmother, Queen Maria, in late 1177; Hamilton believes that Baldwin allowed the match to avoid antagonizing the Ibelins. In July 1178, Baldwin began associating Sibylla with him in some public acts, thereby acknowledging her as next in line to the throne. He contemplated her marriage to Duke Hugh III of Burgundy and wrote to the king of France:

To be deprived of the use of one's limbs is of little help to one in carrying out the work of government ... It is not fitting that a hand so weak as mine should hold power when fear of Arab aggression daily presses upon the Holy City and when my sickness increases the enemy's daring... I therefore beg you that, having called together the barons of the kingdom of France, you immediately choose one of them to take charge of this Holy Kingdom.

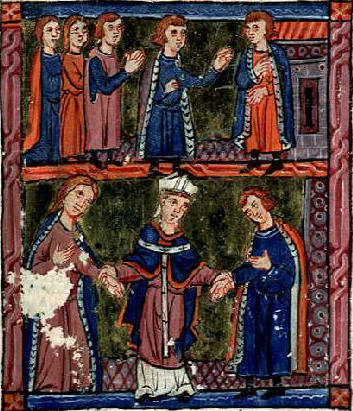
Raymond and Bohemond arrived to find that Sibylla had married Guy, thwarting their apparent coup attempt.

During the Holy Week in 1180, Raymond III of Tripoli and Bohemond III of Antioch marched to Jerusalem with their armies. Hamilton considers it most likely that they intended to force King Baldwin to have Sibylla marry Baldwin of Ibelin and then abdicate, thereby removing the Courtenays from power and promoting a local noble to the throne instead of Sibylla's foreign match. King Baldwin had never approved of Baldwin of Ibelin's ambition to marry his sister, and, though he did wish to abdicate, he was not keen on having terms forced on him. He acted decisively before his kinsmen's armies reached Jerusalem, arranging for Sibylla to marry a Poitevin knight, Guy of Lusignan, even though she was promised to Hugh III of Burgundy. Raymond and Bohemond had no option but to accept the fait accompli and the coup was foiled.

Baldwin had hoped to abdicate, but was prevented by a deep rift within his court. The historian Steven Runciman speaks of a division already existing at the beginning of Baldwin's reign, with the diplomatic native barons and the Hospitallers on one side and the "aggressive, militantly Christian" newcomers from Western Europe and Templars on the other. This view, though common in older historiography, is rejected by modern authors such as Bernard Hamilton and Peter Edbury; Hamilton posits that the factions arose only after Sibylla's marriage to Guy and centered on the King's paternal relatives (cousins Raymond of Tripoli and Bohemond of Antioch; stepmother, Maria; and her new family, the Ibelins) and maternal relatives (mother, Agnes; stepfather, Reynald; sister, Sibylla; brother-in-law, Guy; uncle, Joscelin; and Raynald of Châtillon), of whom Baldwin supported the latter. In light of these problems, Baldwin proposed a two-year truce with Saladin beginning in May of 1180. Saladin was glad to accept and campaign freely in northern Syria. This truce did not include Tripoli, which had not taken part in the negotiations, enabling Saladin to launch raids there. Baldwin sent his uncle and chief minister, Joscelin, to assure the Byzantine court that Jerusalem still needed their protection, but Emperor Manuel died during the negotiations and the seneschal had to spend the entire winter in Constantinople to complete them. From mid-1180 to mid-1181, the full burden of government thus fell on the shoulders of the sickly king, who relied chiefly on his mother during this period.

To secure Guy's position and prevent the emergence of an alternative claimant, Baldwin had his eight-year-old half-sister, Isabella, the daughter of Maria Komnene, solemnly betrothed to the teenage lord of Toron, Humphrey IV, in October 1180. Isabella was subsequently sent to live at Kerak Castle with Stephanie of Milly, Humphrey's mother, as far as possible from her own maternal kin and any potential conspirators. By the terms of the marriage contract, Humphrey ceded Toron to Baldwin, who thus prevented the union of two great fiefs under one vassal and strengthened his position against the count of Tripoli.

Baldwin IV's family, including the Courtenay party (blue rectangular) and their opponents (red rounded)

Baldwin II of Jerusalem	Morphia of Melitene
Eremburga of Maine	Fulk V of Anjou	Melisende of Jerusalem	Alice of Jerusalem	Hodierna of Jerusalem
Geoffrey V of Anjou	Sibylla of Anjou	Baldwin III of Jerusalem	Joscelin of Courtenay	Agnes of Courtenay	Amalric of Jerusalem	Maria Komnene	Balian of Ibelin	Stephanie of Milly	Raynald of Châtillon	Constance of Antioch	Raymond III of Tripoli
Henry II of England	Philip I of Flanders	William of Montferrat	Sibylla of Jerusalem	Guy of Lusignan	Baldwin IV of Jerusalem	Isabella I of Jerusalem	Humphrey IV of Toron	Bohemond III of Antioch	Maria of Antioch	Manuel I Komnenos	Baldwin of Antioch
Baldwin V of Jerusalem

=== Truce and resumed hostilities ===
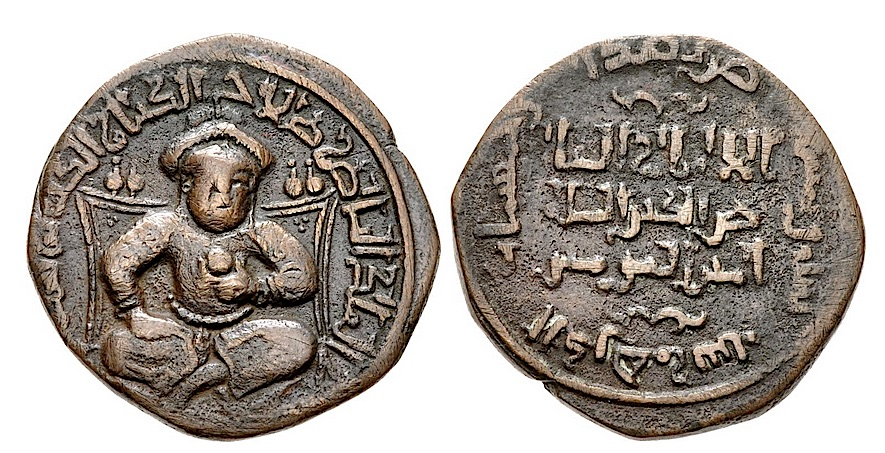
Saladin as depicted on a dirham coin, c. 1190

Baldwin used his truce with Saladin to strengthen the position of his maternal kin, granting Maron and Chastel Neuf to Joscelin and property rights over Toron to Agnes, while associating Guy and Sibylla with him in public acts. He remained unreconciled with Raymond and forbade him to enter the kingdom in early 1182, owing to suspicions of another conspiracy. Baldwin probably intended to charge Raymond with treason and deprive him of the Principality of Galilee, a fief of Jerusalem held by Raymond through his marriage to Eschiva of Bures. The law prevented the king from seizing the fief without the assent of the High Court, and its members urged Baldwin to reconcile with Raymond; Baldwin reluctantly heeded his vassals' advice.

Baldwin's truce with Saladin was due to expire in May 1182, but was broken in mid-1181 by Raynald, who seized a merchant caravan on its way from Egypt to Damascus. Raynald ignored the King's request to make restitution to Saladin, who was preparing to annex the Zengid-ruled Aleppo. The king, who consistently acted against Saladin's attempts to expand into northern Syria, decided to oppose him. The recent anti-Catholic coup in Constantinople gave Saladin confidence to attack the Kingdom of Jerusalem, and in July, Baldwin marched with his host to relieve the Muslims' siege of Bethsan. His outnumbered army won the Battle of Le Forbelet; the historian Bernard Hamilton attributes the victory to the respect and loyalty commanded by Baldwin, who stayed on the battlefield despite his illness and intense heat. According to William of Tyre, as many men died of sunstroke as by the sword.

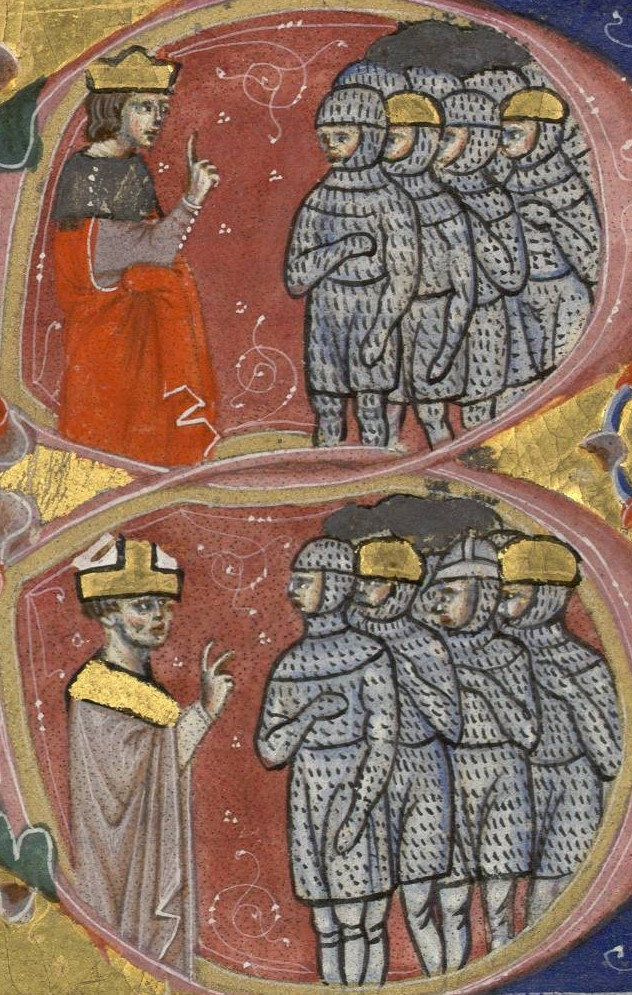
Baldwin with his army as depicted in Rome in 1295

Saladin took his host to besiege Beirut, while another army from Egypt attacked the south of the kingdom. In August, Baldwin went to Tyre to arrange the defence of the kingdom. He ordered the requisition of ships from the port of Tyre to organize a fleet capable of defeating the Egyptian navy. From there, he procured assistance from the Italian maritime republics in lifting Saladin's naval blockade of Beirut. Thirty-three galleys, mostly from the republics of Genoa, Pisa, and Venice, were thus launched towards the north. At the same time, Saladin's fleet attempted the siege of Beirut; Baldwin sent a messenger there, informing that he would arrive there in three days. Saladin intercepted the message and abandoned the siege, but declined to make a truce, worrying Baldwin and his advisers.

Saladin proceeded north to fight the Zengids, thereby expanding his realm, while Baldwin first led an attack on Saladin's Damascene territory, and then on Bosra, before finally laying siege to and capturing Cave de Sueth. In the winter of 1182–1183, after agreeing on a strategy with his council, Baldwin attacked Damascus again; he threatened to destroy a mosque in Darayya, but local Christians convinced him not to for fear of losing their churches in retaliation.

== Last years ==
=== Progressing disability ===
Baldwin could not walk unsupported or use his hands from 1183. Because of an inability to blink, his cornea dried and he became blind. He nevertheless had to summon his troops in response to Saladin's march south following the Egyptian conquest of Aleppo in June. Baldwin then developed a severe fever, leaving him unlikely to survive. He was attended by his mother and the new patriarch, Heraclius, at nearby Nazareth, and having summoned the High Court to his bedside, Baldwin entrusted the government to his brother-in-law, Guy, who was next in line to succeed him. Guy's appointment to regency was meant to be permanent; Baldwin retained only the royal title and authority over the city of Jerusalem, but he had Guy swear that, while Baldwin lived, he would not make himself king or alienate parts of the royal demesne.

Fearing discontent among his barons, Baldwin had failed to give Guy any experience in military leadership before making him regent. The great lords of the kingdom, Bohemond III of Antioch, and Raymond III of Tripoli, and the grand masters of the military orders refused to cooperate with Guy. Baldwin recovered unexpectedly and returned to Jerusalem. Having found that the coastal climate suited his health, he offered Jerusalem to Guy in exchange for Tyre. Guy brusquely refused, possibly because Tyre was more lucrative, leaving Baldwin gravely insulted.

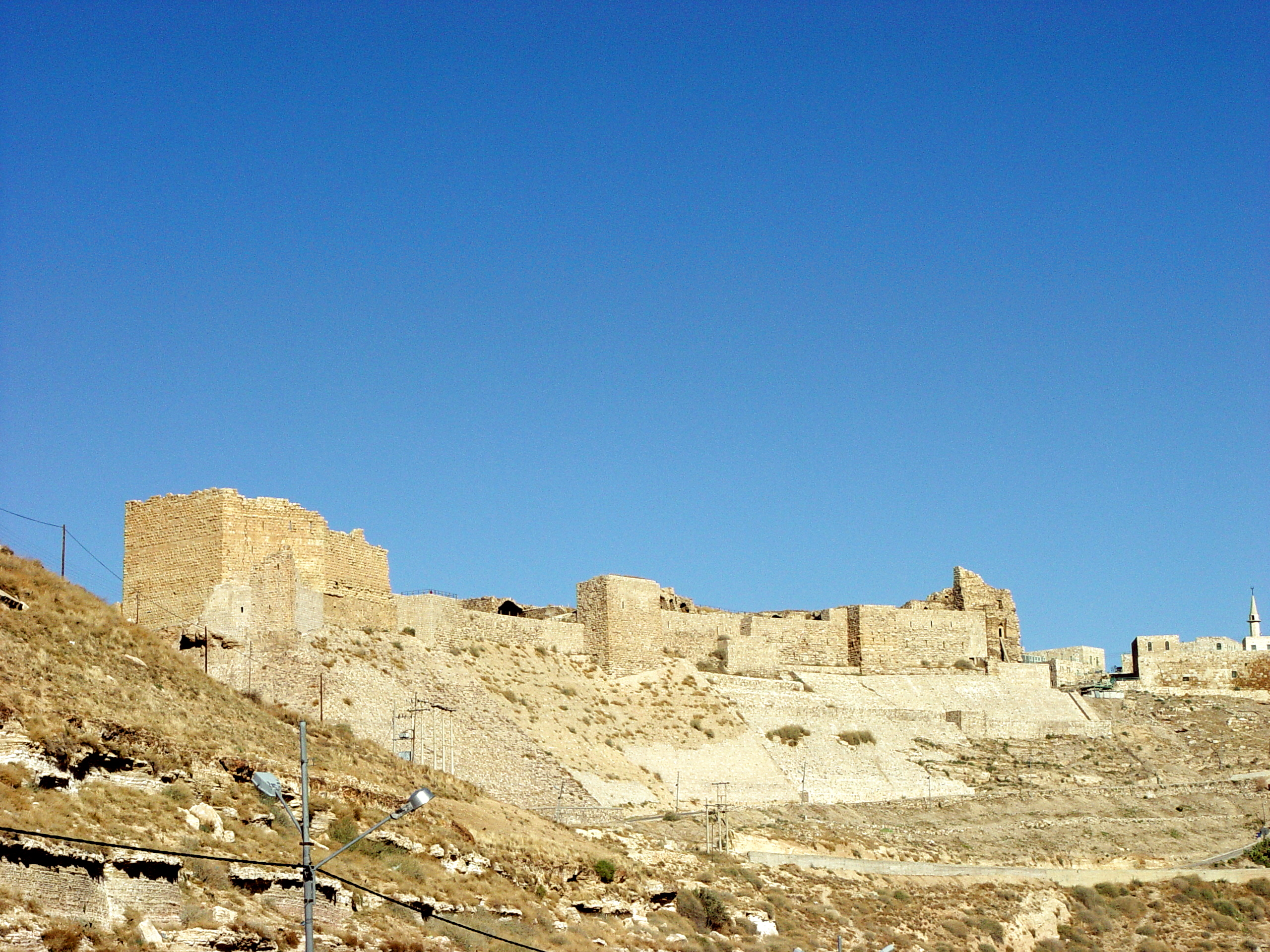
Baldwin's 11-year-old half-sister was getting married at Kerak Castle when Saladin besieged it.

The wedding of Baldwin's half-sister, Isabella, and Humphrey IV of Toron was celebrated in Kerak in late 1183. Saladin attacked during the festivities and laid siege to the castle, hoping to capture the King's half-sister and her husband. The retired king had gathered a council in Jerusalem to inform him about the government of the kingdom when news about the siege reached him. The defence of such a vital fortress and the King's half-sister within it could not be entrusted to Guy, who had proven unable to command the troops. Although Heraclius, along with the grand masters of the Templars and Hospitallers, tried to intervene on Guy's behalf, it was no use; Raymond, Bohemond, and Reynald easily convinced Baldwin to dismiss Guy. Despite the burden of his illness, Baldwin immediately dismissed Guy from the regency and resumed power. Guy's removal from power was effectively disinheritance, and at the council's insistence, deliberations about the kingdom's succession followed. The proposal of the King's mother that Sibylla's five-year-old son, Baldwin, be made co-king was accepted, and the boy was crowned on 20 November 1183.

In late November, Baldwin ordered the lighting of a beacon on the Tower of David, which may have been the first in a chain of such beacons to hearten the defenders of the intensely bombarded Kerak. Baldwin accompanied his troops again, but having become blind and immobile, he went in a litter slung between two horses. His presence was essential to unite the discordant barons, and even his humiliated brother-in-law led his men. Since Baldwin was far too ill to take part in any fighting, he appointed Raymond III of Tripoli as field commander. Warned by his scouts about the King's approach and concerned about having left Egypt unguarded, Saladin abandoned the siege on 4 December, and Baldwin entered Kerak triumphantly. He remained there for several days, inspecting the fortifications, helping with repairs, and replenishing the food supply.

=== Brother-in-law's insubordination ===
The question of regency for his nephew troubled Baldwin; the only way to ensure that Guy could not claim it was to have his marriage to Sibylla annulled. Baldwin discussed this with the patriarch, Heraclius, intending to claim that he had forced his sister to marry Guy and that the marriage was unlawful because of that. Sibylla's unwavering loyalty to Guy thwarted his plans, as the couple refused to appear at court.

Early in 1184, Baldwin ordered Guy to attend him as a vassal in Jerusalem, but Guy declined, citing poor health. After this was repeated several times, Baldwin had himself carried to Ascalon in the company of the High Court, where Guy refused to let him into the city. From the battlements and towers, the inhabitants witnessed Baldwin ceremoniously raise his hand to knock on the gates and demand admission, only for the gates to remain closed. Baldwin was then welcomed in Jaffa, where he installed a governor, thereby depriving Guy of half of his county. In Acre, Baldwin summoned his council, probably to gain support to seize Guy's fief on the grounds of refusal of the royal summons. The patriarch and the grand masters begged Baldwin to forgive Guy to avoid a civil war. This was as unacceptable to Baldwin, as it would have been to any contemporary king, but the patriarch and the grand masters stormed out of the council, swaying the rest of the assembly to withhold support for the action.

Baldwin was reconciled with the patriarch and the grand masters by June when he sent them to Europe on a diplomatic mission to seek aid for the kingdom. He informed them by letter that Saladin was once more besieging Kerak, and again, Saladin abandoned the siege when the litter-bound king approached with his army. Once in Kerak, Baldwin ordered and financed the repairs of the damaged castle.

=== Last months, death, and aftermath ===
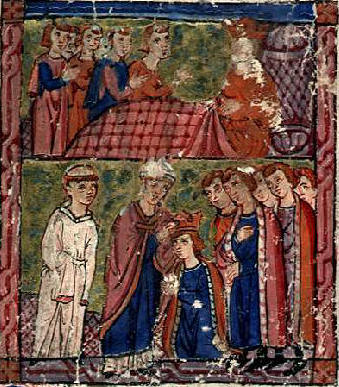
Death of Baldwin IV and coronation of Baldwin V in the 1280 edition of William of Tyre's Histoire d'Outremer

In late 1184, Baldwin was shocked to learn about Guy's massacre of the Bedouin of the royal fief of Darum, who were under royal protection and who provided information about the Egyptians' movements. At that time, Baldwin developed another fever. When he returned to Jerusalem in late 1184 or early 1185, he bestowed regency on Raymond of Tripoli, whom he had never trusted but to whom he could find no better alternative. Baldwin expected to survive the illness, having done so twice before, but within weeks it became apparent that he would not. On his deathbed, Baldwin summoned the High Court to appoint a permanent regent for his nephew, Baldwin V, and Raymond was chosen. The dying king ordered that homage be rendered to his nephew as king and to Raymond as regent, to be followed by a solemn crown-wearing ceremony at the Church of the Holy Sepulchre.

Baldwin IV died, attended by his vassals, in March 1185, or before 16 May 1185 at the latest when Baldwin V is recorded as the sole king. He was buried in the Church of the Holy Sepulchre, close to his father, King Amalric. The young Baldwin V died the next year, and his mother and successor, Sibylla, made Guy king. Saladin destroyed the Kingdom of Jerusalem with his decisive victory over Guy at the Horns of Hattin in 1187. Sibylla and her daughters died in 1190, leaving Isabella I as the heir to the defeated kingdom.

== Assessment and legacy ==
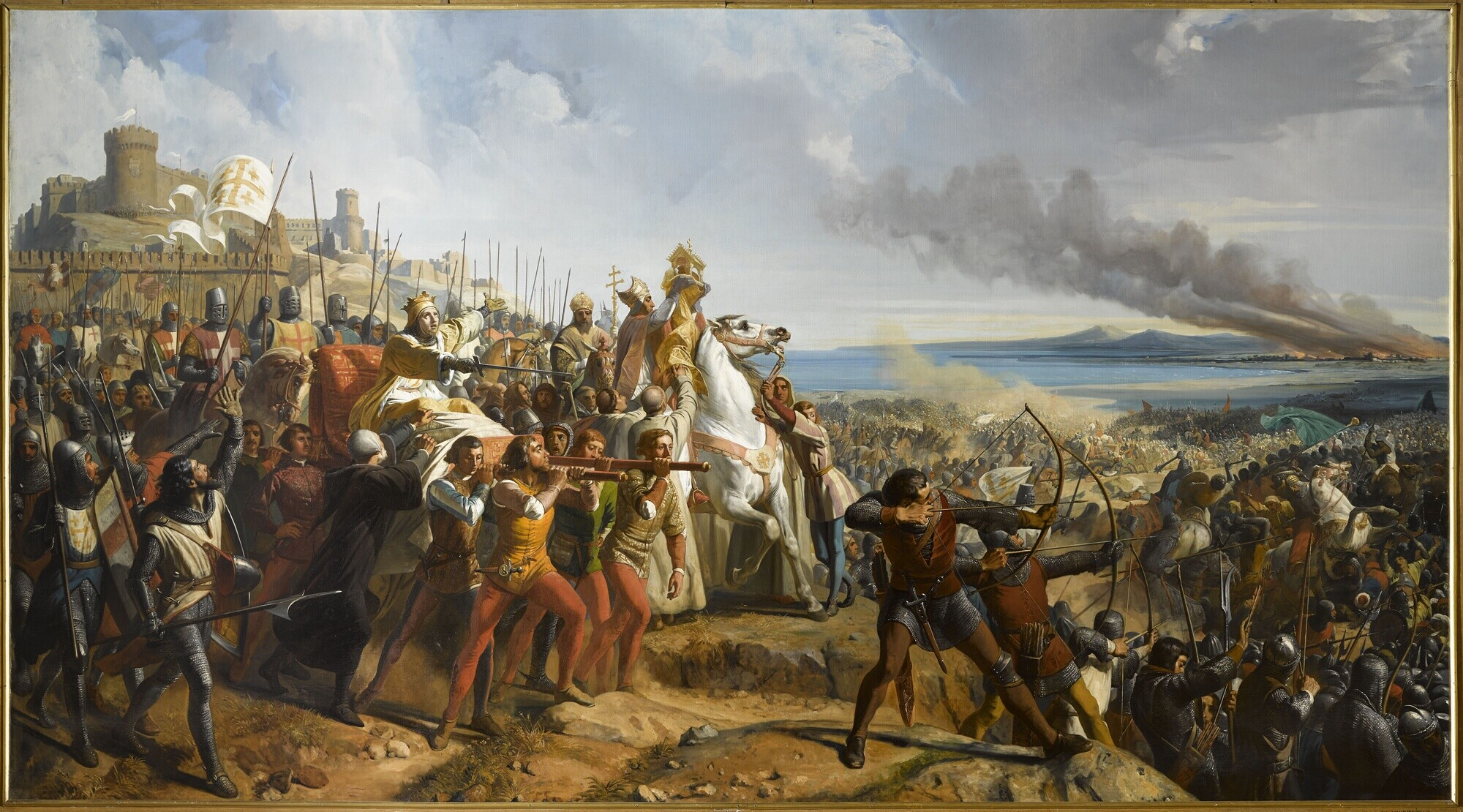
19th-century depiction of Baldwin commanding troops at the Battle of Montgisard, by Charles-Philippe Larivière. Baldwin is depicted in a litter, but he was still mobile at the time and fought this battle on horseback.

Christian defeat at Hattin two years after Baldwin's death marred his legacy, and historians traced instability to his reign. Yet, while Baldwin was on the throne, the kingdom lost no territory and flourished both economically and spiritually. Baldwin understood the importance of curbing Saladin's power, which was reflected in his choice of ministers. He did not devise strategy or diplomacy alone, and delegated Church patronage to his mother Agnes and finances to his uncle Joscelin. His chief contribution was his determination not to abdicate before finding a suitable successor despite leprosy making government an unbearable burden. As was clear during his reign and especially in its disastrous aftermath, Baldwin alone preserved unity in the kingdom. Long after his death, he was hailed as the final Christian leader to successfully defend Jerusalem.

Contemporary Christian theologians were divided on the issue of Baldwin's leprosy. Pope Alexander III showed little sympathy when writing about Baldwin, declaring his leprosy a "just judgement of God", but another school of thought encouraged the faithful to see the Christ in the affected. Baldwin's reign may have led to a lesser stigmatization of the illness in the 13th-century Kingdom of Jerusalem, but his subjects' acceptance of his illness confounded some Muslims. Muslim historian Imad al-Din al-Isfahani wrote:

In spite of illness, the Franks were loyal to him, they gave him every encouragement ... being satisfied to have him as their ruler; they exalted him ... they were anxious to keep him in office, but they paid no attention to his leprosy.

The Andalusian pilgrim Ibn Jubayr, who visited the kingdom in 1184, also had a negative impression of Baldwin:

The pig, the lord of Acre whom they call king, lives secluded and is not seen, for God has afflicted him with leprosy ...

Baldwin's chastity may have aided his public image; this was seen as evidence of extraordinary sanctity because his contemporaries believed that lepers were extremely lustful. His success against Saladin was also interpreted as a sign of God's favor. After the disastrous Seventh Crusade, a crusader was told by an old man in Damascus:

I have seen a time when King Baldwin of Jerusalem, the one who was a leper, beat Saladin although he only had 300 armed men against Saladin's 3,000. But now, your sins have come to such a pass that we round you up in the fields like cattle.

Despite perceived sanctity, Baldwin was not remarkably pious. Although he openly wished to abdicate, he had no intention of leading a monastic life. He was primarily a knight, both in character and in upbringing, and to his contemporaries, his most distinctive traits were his courage and honour.

=== In popular culture ===
Baldwin IV is one of the main characters of the 2005 epic historical drama film Kingdom of Heaven where he is played by actor Edward Norton, with Norton's performance having been described as "phenomenal", and "so far removed from anything that he has ever done that we see the true complexities."

Regnal titles
Preceded by Amalric	King of Jerusalem; 1174–1185 with Baldwin V (1183–1185)	Succeeded by Baldwin V
