= Battle of Montgisard =

1177 battle between the Crusaders and Ayyubids

- Part of the Crusades
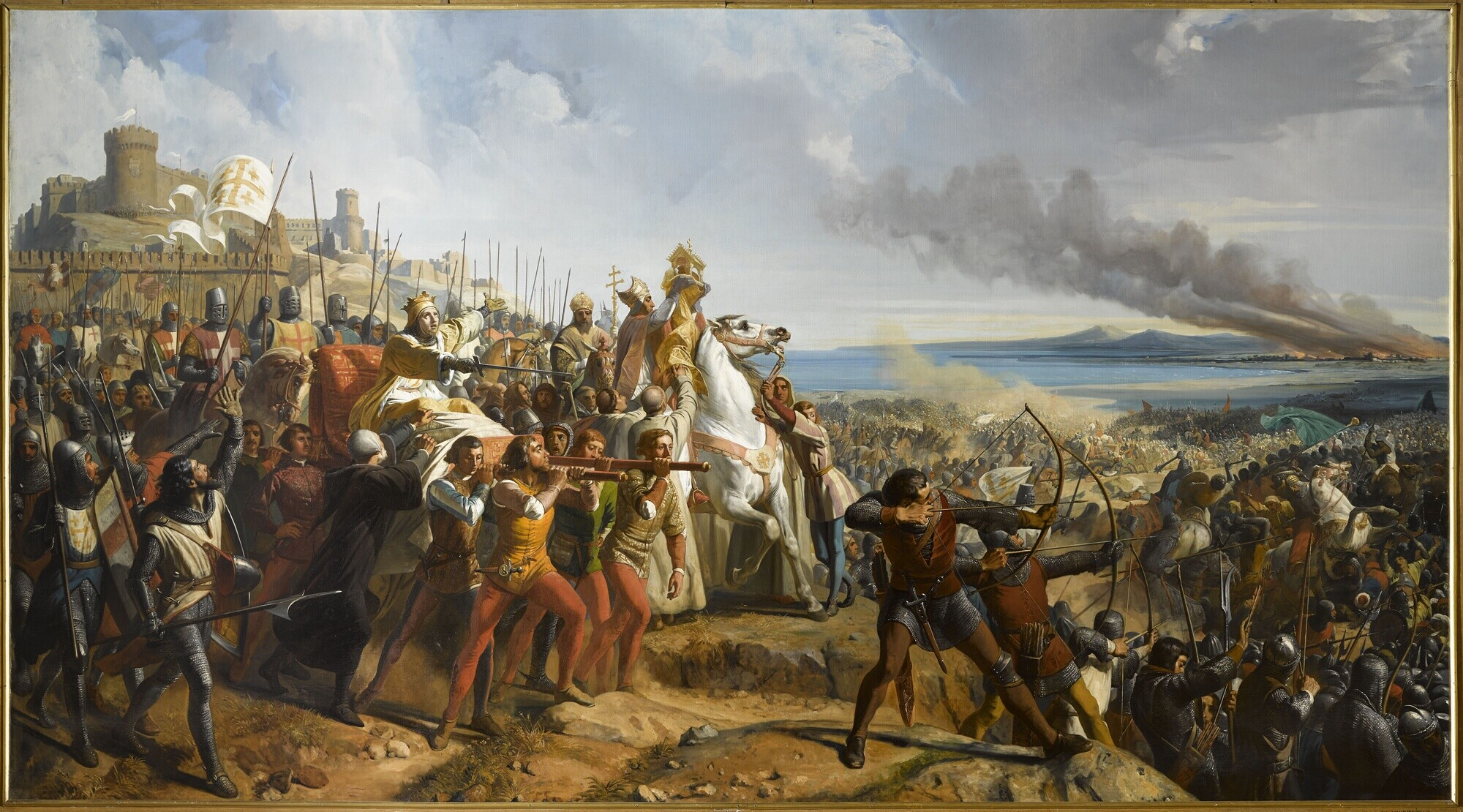
- The Battle of Montgisard, 1177. Charles Philippe Larivière, 1842–1844
Date	25 November 1177
Location	Montgisard (possibly Gezer), near Ramla, Kingdom of Jerusalem
Result	Crusader victory

Belligerents
Kingdom of Jerusalem	Ayyubid Sultanate of Egypt

Commanders and leaders
Baldwin IV; Renaud de Châtillon; Eudes de Saint-Amand	Saladin; Taqi al-Din Umar

Strength
4,500: 80 Templars; 375 other knights; 2,500–4,000 infantry and archers	26,000 (Note: The Latin estimates of Saladin's army are possibly exaggerated (26,000 in Tyre xxi. 23, 12,000 Turks and 9,000 Arabs in Anon.Rhen. v. 517))

Casualties and losses
1,850 casualties: 1,100 killed; 750 wounded	Most of the army killed

The Battle of Montgisard was fought between the Kingdom of Jerusalem and the Ayyubid Sultanate of Egypt on 25 November 1177 at Montgisard, in the Levant between Ramla and Yibna.

Baldwin IV of Jerusalem, severely afflicted by leprosy, alongside Renaud de Châtillon, led Christian forces against Muslim troops led by Saladin in what became one of the most notable engagements of the Crusades. The Egyptian army was quickly routed and pursued for twelve miles. Saladin fled back to Cairo, reaching the city on 8 December, with only a tenth of his army.

While Saladin did defeat Baldwin IV in the Battle of Marj Ayyun in 1179, two years later, Muslim historians considered Saladin's defeat at Montgisard to be so severe that it was only redeemed by his victory ten years later at the battles of Cresson and Hattin and the Siege of Jerusalem in 1187.

== Background ==
In 1177, King Baldwin IV of Jerusalem and Philip of Alsace, who had recently arrived on pilgrimage, planned an alliance with the Byzantine Empire for a naval attack on Egypt. The Byzantines sent a war fleet in preparation for the invasion of Egypt, but none of these plans came to fruition. Instead, Philip decided to join Raymond III of Tripoli’s expedition to attack the Saracen stronghold of Harim in northern Syria. A large Crusader army, the Knights Hospitaller, and many Knights Templar followed him. This left the Kingdom of Jerusalem with few troops to defend its various territories. Meanwhile, Saladin was planning his own expedition into the Kingdom of Jerusalem from Egypt; with the Frankish army in northern Syria, he rushed to invade Baldwin's kingdom on 18 November. Though still recovering from malaria, Baldwin, alongside the nobleman Raynald of Châtillon, rode to meet the sultan with, according to William of Tyre, only 375 Knights to attempt to hold Ascalon while the Knights Templar hurried to defend Gaza. In desperation, Baldwin issued an arrière-ban, summoning all able-bodied men to join the army and fight with him. However, many of these soldiers would be captured and sold into slavery by Saladin's army, which was looting the kingdom as they traveled.

Saladin reached Ascalon on 22 November 1177, and Baldwin led his troops out to meet him. However, upon seeing how massively outnumbered he was, the king and his army retreated into the city. Saladin, believing that Baldwin's army didn't pose any threat to him, proceeded towards Jerusalem. In the meantime, Baldwin contacted the Templars and ordered them to abandon Gaza to join him. Baldwin and Raynald subsequently broke out of Ascalon with the Templars along the coast; Saladin was not expecting this, and did not send any scouts to watch and give him information on the city.

== Opposing forces ==
The true numbers are impossible to estimate, since the Christian sources refer only to knights and give no account of the number of infantry and turcopoles, except that it is evident from the number of the dead and wounded that there must have been more men than the 375 Knights. It is also uncertain whether the so-called knights included mounted sergeants or squires, or whether they were true knights. One contemporary chronicler gave a strength of 7,000 for the Crusader army, while another contemporary estimate of 20,000 was probably a textual corruption of 10,000. However, modern historians generally deem the number of Frankish troops to have been lower; 80 Templars and 375 Knights for less than 500 armored heavy cavalry, as well as 2,500 to 4,000 infantry and archers (including spearmen, swordsmen, axemen, crossbowmen and turcopoles).

An 1181 review listed Saladin's Mamluk forces at 6,976 Ghulams and 1,553 Qaraghulams (archers). However, there would have been additional soldiers available in Syria and elsewhere, while auxiliaries might have accompanied the Mamluks. William of Tyre reported Saladin's strength as 26,000, while an anonymous chronicler estimated 12,000 Turkish and 9,000 Arab troops, which Stevenson calls "greatly exaggerated". Accompanying Baldwin was Raynald of Châtillon, Lord of Oultrejordain, who had just been released from captivity in Aleppo in 1176. Raynald of Châtillon was a staunch enemy of Saladin and was King Baldwin's second-in-command. Also with the army were Baldwin of Ibelin, his brother Balian, Reginald Grenier and Joscelin III of Edessa. Odo de St Amand, Grand Master of the Knights Templar, came with 80 Templar Knights. Another Templar force attempted to meet Baldwin IV at Ascalon to no avail, as they were besieged at Gaza.

== Battle ==
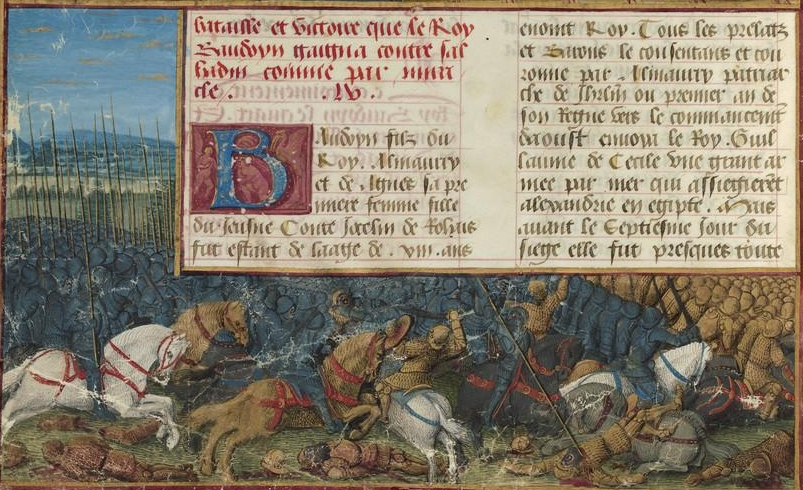
Late 15th century depiction of the battle from a copy of the Passages d'outremer

Saladin continued his march towards Jerusalem, underestimating the leper king Baldwin IV and believing he would not be followed. Believing Baldwin and his forces were not an immediate threat, he possibly allowed his army to be spread out over a large area to forage and gather additional resources. Unbeknownst to Saladin, the command he had left to subdue the King had been insufficient, and now both Baldwin and the Templars were marching to intercept him before he reached Jerusalem.

The Christians, led by the King Baldwin IV of Jerusalem, pursued the Muslims along the coast, finally catching their enemies at Mons Gisardi (Montgisard), near Ramla. The location is disputed, as Ramla was a large region that included the town under the same name. Malcolm Barber equates Mons Gisardi with the mound of Al-Safiya. Saladin's chronicler Imad ad-Din al-Isfahani refers to the battle taking place by the mound of Al-Safiya, potentially modern Tell es-Safi near the village of Menehem, not far from Ashkelon and within the contemporary Ramla province. Al-Safiya means white and, indeed, the Es-Safi hill is white with rocky outcrops, out from which sprouted the foundations of a Crusader Castle that had been hastily built at the top, called Blanchegarde. Ibn al-Athīr, one of the Arab chroniclers, mentions that Saladin intended to lay siege to a Crusader Castle in the area. But Saladin's supply train had allegedly been mired. There is a small stream north of Tell es-Safi bordering farmland that in November might have been plowed up and muddy enough to hinder the passage of the train. The Egyptian chroniclers agree that the supplies had been delayed at a river crossing. It is said that the army of Saladin may have been taken by surprise due to the circumstances. Some sources assume that Saladin underestimated Baldwin IV. Saladin had purposely left his baggage train at al-Arish so that his army would more swiftly move through occupied Crusader territory. And so, the army had instead resorted to sourcing their victuals along the way.

It is said that King Baldwin IV ordered the relic of the True Cross to be raised in front of the opposing troops. The King, whose teenage body was already ravaged by aggressive leprosy, was helped from his horse and dropped to his knees before the cross. Sources say he prayed to God for victory and rose to his feet to cheers from his men, moved by what they had just witnessed. Though Baldwin was very ill and could barely ride his horse, he decided it was too late to turn back and so pressed the attack.

The crusader army then attacked their exhausted foes, inflicting heavy casualties. King Baldwin IV, fighting with bandaged hands to cover his sores, was said to be in the thick of battle. Egyptian effective command was under Saladin's nephew Taqi ad-Din. Taqi ad-Din apparently attacked while Saladin was preparing his Mamluk guard. Baldwin's army, in turn, caught a portion of Saladin's troops by surprise. Saladin gathered his forces for battle, albeit unprepared, and the sultan signalled for the battle to commence. Taqi's son Ahmad died in the early fighting. Saladin's men were quickly overwhelmed, and the Sultan commander himself narrowly evaded capture, according to Ralph de Diceto, on the swift back of a camel. By nightfall, the Egyptian troops that were with the Sultan had reached Caunetum Esturnellorum, near the mound of Tell el-Hesi (about 25 miles out of Ramla; and 7 km from Tell es-Safi).

The victorious King Baldwin IV returned to Ascalon. Only 10% of the Sultan's army returned to Egypt alongside their commander.

== Aftermath ==
The cause of Saladin's retreat and subsequent Christian victory struck all Muslims. In the wake of the confusion, a few parties initially misinformed the masses about the outcome. Baldwin IV memorialized his victory by erecting a Benedictine monastery on the battlefield, dedicated to St. Catherine of Alexandria, whose feast day fell on the day of the battle. However, it was a difficult victory; Roger de Moulins, Grand Master of the Knights Hospitaller, reported that 1,100 men had been killed and 750 returned home wounded.

Meanwhile, Raymond III of Tripoli and Bohemund III of Antioch joined with Philip I of Alsace in a separate expedition against Harim in Syria; the siege of Harim lasted into 1178, and Saladin's defeat at Montgisard prevented him from relieving his Syrian vassals.

== Bibliography ==
- Lane-Poole, Stanley (1906). Saladin and the Fall of the Kingdom of Jerusalem. Heroes of the Nations. London: G. P. Putnam's Sons.
- Lyons, M. C.; Jackson, D.E.P. (1982). Saladin: the Politics of the Holy War. Cambridge University Press. ISBN 978-0-521-31739-9.
- Morgan, Philip (2010). "Commemoration of Battles and Warriors". In Rogers, Clifford J. (ed.). The Oxford Encyclopedia of Medieval Warfare and Military Technology. Vol. 1: Aachen, Siege of - Dyrrachium, Siege and Battle of (1081). Oxford University Press. pp. 411–413.
- Richard, Jean (1979). The Latin kingdom of Jerusalem. Vol. 1. North-Holland Pub. Co. ISBN 0444850929.
- Stevenson, W. B. (1907). The Crusaders in the East: a brief history of the wars of Islam with the Latins in Syria during the twelfth and thirteenth centuries. Cambridge University Press. "The Latin estimates of Saladin's army are no doubt greatly exaggerated (26,000 in Tyre xxi. 23, 12,000 Turks and 9,000 Arabs in Anon.Rhen. v. 517"
- Hamilton, Bernard (2000). The Leper King and His Heirs: Baldwin IV and the Crusader Kingdom of Jerusalem. Cambridge University Press. ISBN 9780521017473.
