= Battle of Marj Ayyun =

Battle in 1179

- Part of the Crusades
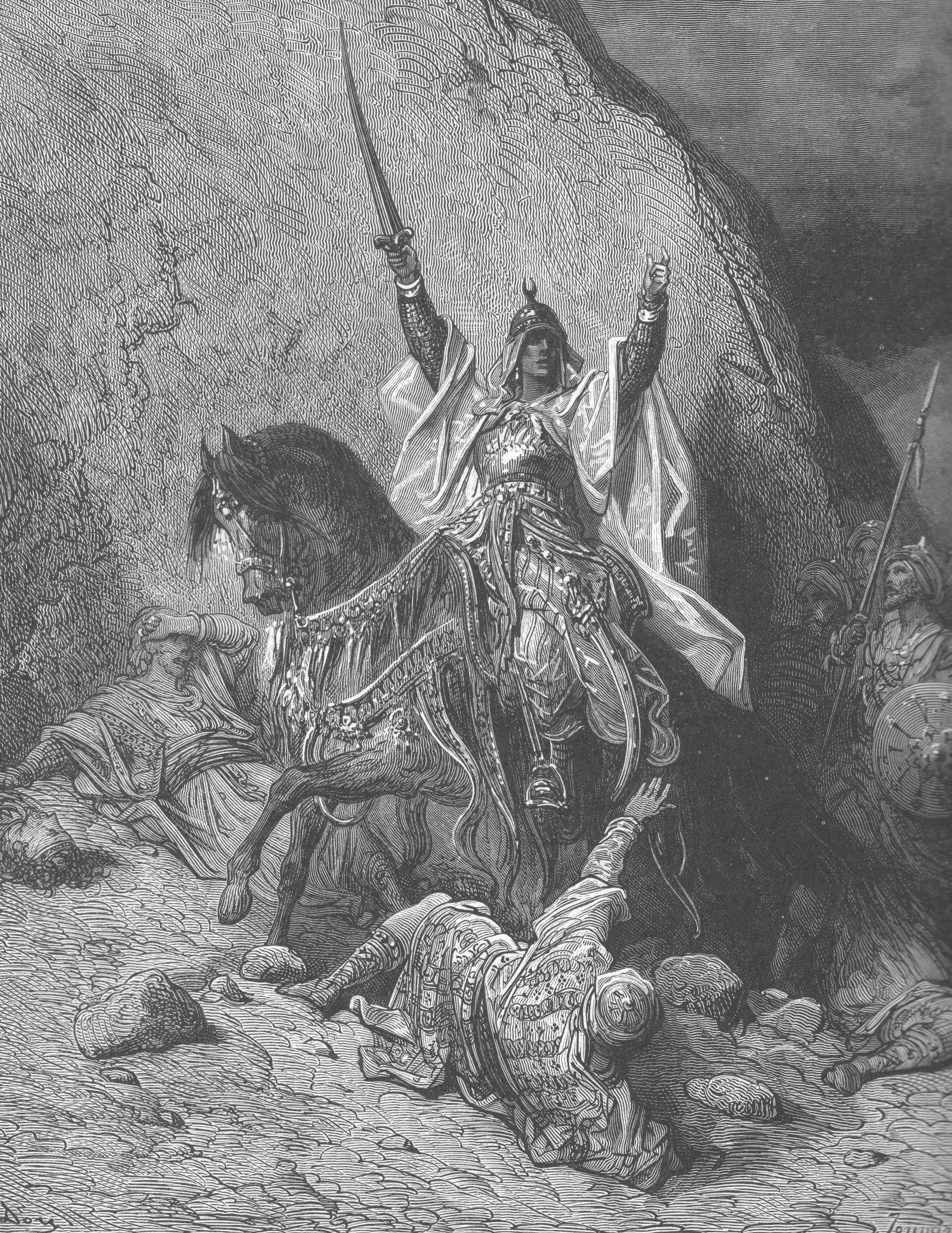
- Saladin the Victorious. Gustave Doré, XIX century
Date	10 June 1179
Location	Marjayoun, Mount Lebanon, Principality of Galilee of the Kingdom of Jerusalem
Result	Ayyubid victory

Belligerents
Kingdom of Jerusalem; Knights Templar	Ayyubid Dynasty

Commanders and leaders
Baldwin IV of Jerusalem; Raymond III of Tripoli; Eudes de St Amand (POW)	Saladin

Strength
1,000 Lancers	Unknown

Casualties and losses
Heavy: Many dead and wounded; 70+ Knights captured	Unknown

The Battle of Marj Ayyun was a military confrontation fought at Marj Ayyun near the Litani River (modern-day Lebanon) in June 1179 between the Kingdom of Jerusalem under Baldwin IV and the Ayyubid armies under the leadership of Saladin. It ended in a decisive victory for the Muslims and is considered the first in the long series of Islamic victories under Saladin against the Christians. However, the Christian King, Baldwin IV of Jerusalem, who was crippled by leprosy, was saved by his bodyguard and narrowly escaped capture.

== Background ==
In 1177, Saladin's Ayyubid army invaded the Christian Kingdom of Jerusalem from Egypt. In that year King Baldwin IV surprised and defeated the Saracen host at the Battle of Montgisard.

In 1179, Saladin again invaded the Crusader states, from the direction of Damascus. He based his army at Banias and sent raiding forces to despoil villages and crops near Sidon and the coastal areas. Farmers and townspeople impoverished by Saracen raiders would be unable to pay rent to their Frankish overlords. Unless stopped, Saladin's destructive policy would weaken the Crusader Kingdom of Jerusalem.

In response, Baldwin moved his army to Tiberias on the Sea of Galilee. From there he marched north-northwest to the stronghold of Safed. Continuing in the same direction, he reached Toron castle (Tebnine), about 13 miles (21 km) east-southeast of Tyre. Together with the Knights Templar led by Odo of St Amand and a force from the County of Tripoli led by Count Raymond III, Baldwin moved northeast.

== Battle ==
The Kingdom of Jerusalem still hoped for an opportunity to attack Egypt, but they were not strong enough. In 1178, a fortress at Jacob's Ford - a border crossing outpost north of Lake Tiberias, called by the Arab scholars Beit el-Ahzan - was built as a post of defense and a base from which attacks in the future might be made. On the borders, the castles and posts were now under the command of the fierce religious military orders. During the summer of 1179, severe drought gripped the Levant, while minor skirmishes erupted. Saladin offered to pay the Crusaders 100,000 dinars in exchange for halting incursions and dismantling the castle at Jacob's Ford but the Crusaders refused, and hostilities resumed.

From the eastern side of the coastal range, the Crusaders saw Saladin's tents in the distance. Baldwin IV and his nobles decided to descend to the plain and attack at once. As the Frankish army moved downhill, the mounted troops soon outstripped the foot soldiers. After a few hours' delay, the Crusader army reassembled, then encountered and easily defeated the Saracen raiding forces, who were returning from their forays.

Believing the battle won, the Franks let their guard down. Raymond's Knights and Odo of St Amand's Templars moved onto some high ground between the Marj Ayyun and the Litani River. The Crusader infantry rested from their hurried march earlier in the day.

Suddenly, Saladin's main army attacked the Crusaders, defeating them badly. Observers of the time blamed the defeat on Odo of St Amand, who was captured in the battle. King Baldwin IV barely was saved by his bodyguard and escaped capture; unable to mount a horse because of his crippling disease, he was carried to safety by a knight as his bodyguard cut a path through the Saracens. Many Frankish survivors of the struggle fled to shelter at Beaufort Castle (Qala'at ash-Shaqif Arnoun) about 5 miles (8.0 km) southwest of the battlefield.

== Aftermath ==
One account suggests, the Templars attacked Saladin's larger force on their own, rather than falling back, warning the King, and fighting with him. William, Archbishop of Tyre, blamed the reckless actions of the Templars for the defeat, as he stated. However, the Templars were not subjects of the King Baldwin IV and followed their own policies and strategies.

For the King himself, the battle revealed the deterioration of his physical condition; he could no longer command his armies from horseback. Saladin was able to exploit his victory, laying siege to the new Frankish fortress at Jacob’s Ford and destroying it in August 1179. Saladin immediately took advantage of his victory by destroying the newly built Le Chastellet stronghold at the Battle of Jacob's Ford. In the years after Marj Ayyun, the Frankish leaders became more cautious and the next two campaigns of note, the Battle of Belvoir Castle (1182), the Battle of Al-Fule (1183) and the Siege of Kerak (1183) were strictly defensive in nature.

== Sources ==
- Smail, R. C. Crusading Warfare 1097–1193. New York: Barnes & Noble Books, (1956) 1995.
- Stevenson, W (1907). The Crusaders in the East: a brief history of the wars of Islam with the Latins in Syria during the twelfth and thirteenth centuries. Cambridge University Press.
