= Turcopole =

Recruits by the Byzantines and crusaders

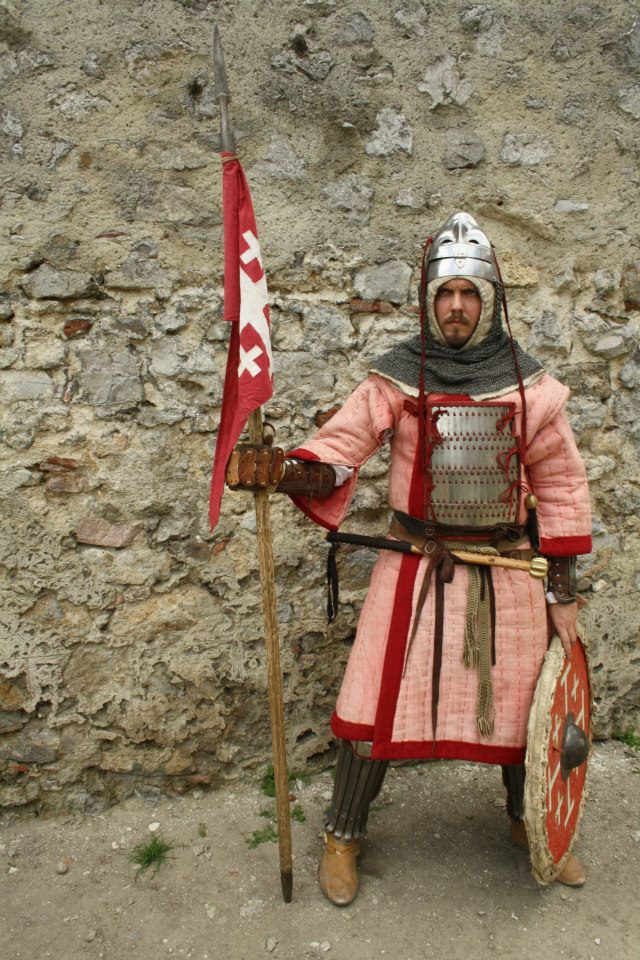
A 12th century turcopole, historical re-enactment

During the Crusades, turcopoles (also "turcopoles" or "turcopoli"; from the Greek: τουρκόπουλοι, literally "sons of Turks"; singular: τουρκόπουλος) were locally recruited mounted archers and light cavalry employed by the Byzantine Empire and the Crusader states. A leader of these auxiliaries was designated as Turcopolier, a title subsequently given to a senior officer in the Knights Templar and the Knights Hospitaller in charge of the coastal defence and fortifications of Rhodes and Malta. In addition to the two Military Orders, the army of the Kingdom of Jerusalem employed king's Turcopoles under the direction of a Grand Turcopolier.

== Byzantine origins ==
The crusaders first encountered Turcopoles in the Byzantine army during the First Crusade. Reference is made to 30 Turcoples being lent by the Emperor Alexius I to act as guides for one division of the Franks. These auxiliaries were of mixed Byzantine and Turkic origins.

Raymond of Aguilers writes that they were called Turcopoles because they were either reared with Turks or because their fathers were Turks and their mothers Christians. Albert of Aix writes that their fathers were Turks and their mothers Greeks. From the 12th century, evidence suggest that non-Turks fighting in the Turkish fashion were also included in the Turcopoles, for example, in the 14th century Turcopoles who were employed by the Catalan company included Greeks who shaved their heads like the Turks in order to be employed in this capacity.

The term underwent a semantic evolution, extending to light cavalryman, mainly equipped with bows, regardless of ethnic origins.

Some Byzantine Turcopole units under the command of General Tatikios accompanied the First Crusade and may have provided a model for the subsequent employment of indigenous auxiliary light horse in the crusader states.

== Composition ==
It has been argued that, while Turcopoles certainly included light cavalry and mounted archers, the term was a general one also applicable to indigenous Syrian footmen serving as feudal levies in the Kingdom of Jerusalem. Evidence that Syrian levies, whether designated as turcopoles or not, provided the bulk of the "Frankish"-led infantry of Outremer is not available but there are specific references to their participation in the Siege of Tripoli by Raymond IV, Count of Toulouse.

As indigenous auxiliaries recruited from outside the formal feudal system, the numbers of Turcopoles employed by the Latin States were seldom recorded in detail. However in 1168 the Hospitallers pledged 500 Turcopoles to serve with an equivalent number of knight-brothers during an expedition into Muslim territory. Probing raids (chevaucher) of this nature required tactics favouring the use of lightly equipped horsemen and these were the only known occasions when knights accepted leadership from senior Turcopolier officers.

The Turcopoles employed by the crusader states were not necessarily Turkish or multiracial mercenaries. Many were probably recruited from Christianized Seljuq (Kınık) Turks or from Syrian Orthodox Christians living under Crusader rule. By the second half of the 12th century, the recorded names of individual Turcoples indicate that some were Poulains, a twelfth-century term designating Latin Christian settlers in the crusader states of the Middle East. Poulains in this context were Frankish descendants of Crusaders who had remained in Palestine after the capture of Jerusalem in 1099. In addition to indigenous Christians and converted Turks, the Turcopoles of Outremer may at various dates have included contingents from the West trained to serve as mounted archers.

== Equipment ==
In the Holy Land, Turcopoles were more lightly equipped than the knights and sergeants (mounted men-at-arms), armed with lances and bows to help combat the more mobile Muslim forces. Turcopoles served as light cavalry, providing skirmishers, scouts, and mounted archers, and sometimes rode as a second line in a charge to back up the Frankish" knights and sergeants. Turcopoles had lighter and faster horses than the western mounted troops and wore much lighter armour. Usually this comprised only a quilted gambeson or jerkin and a conical steel helmet. Regulations of the Hospitallers made a clear distinction between the heavy war saddles of the knights of the military order and the "Turkish saddles" issued to the Syrian Turcoples who served with them.

== Specialist roles ==
As lightly armed and mobile auxiliaries the Turcopoles were of particular value when scouting and raiding expeditions were undertaken. On such occasions the heavily armoured and relatively slow moving horsemen of the western armies were at a disadvantage. Accordingly this was the sole occasion when Turcopoliers (Turcopole commanders) could issue direct orders to accompanying knights.

== Employment by military orders ==
Turcopoles served in both the secular armies of Outremer and the ranks of the military orders. In the latter, Turcopoles had lower status than Frankish sergeants and were subject to various restrictions. These included having to eat at a separate table from the other mounted soldiers of the Templars or Hospitallers. In contrast to the unsalaried brother-knights and brother-sergeants of the fighting orders, Turcopoles were paid warriors.

An indication of the approximate numbers of Turcopoles available to the military orders is given by a pledge made by the Hospitallers in 1186, when an invasion of Egypt was being planned. Of a total Hospitaller contingent of 1000 men, half were to be Turcopoles.

== Funding ==
A perennial problem for the Christian states of Outremer was the limited quantities of Frankish manpower, horses and weapons available. To a certain extent this weakness was redressed through the employment of locally recruited Turcopoles, riding indigenous horses and using the same equipment as their opponents. The cost of paying the mercenary element amongst the Turcopoles was one of the specific reasons for repeated cash donations being sent to the crusader states from Europe.

== Battle of Hattin ==
At the decisive Battle of Hattin in 1187, the Regni Ierosolimitani brevis hystoria records 4000 Turcopoles within the defeated Christian army. The historian Steven Runciman considers this number exaggerated, and notes that the Muslim light cavalry present were probably better armed than the Turcopoles. The Turcopoles captured at Hattin were, as perceived renegades, probably executed at Saladin's order.

== Later history ==
The Mamluks also considered Turcopoles to be traitors and apostates, killing all those whom they captured. The Turcopoles who survived the Fall of Acre followed the military orders out of the Holy Land and were established on Cyprus with the Knights Templar, plus Rhodes and Malta with the Knights Hospitaller. The Teutonic Order also called its own native light cavalry the "Turkopolen".

== Turcopoliers and attendants ==
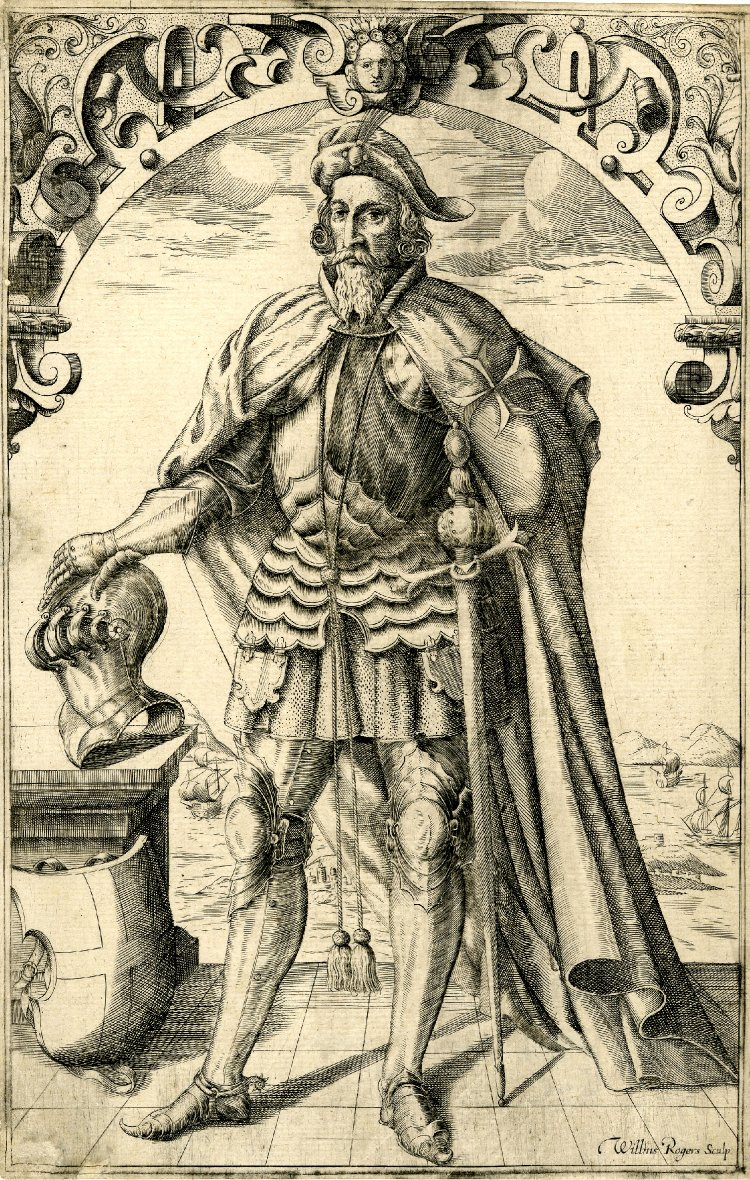
Thomas Docwra (c.1458-1527), Pilier of the English Langue of the Knights Hospitaller from 1499-1501

The Turcopoles had their own leaders called Turcopoliers who outranked ordinary sergeants, at least in battle. The senior office-holders of the Knights Templar included a Turcopolier who commanded both the mercenary cavalry recruited by the Order in the east and the sergeant-brothers. The personal attendants of the Grand Master of the Temple included a Turcopole - possibly as an interpreter or orderly. The Hospitallers included in their rank-structure a Turcopolier, who originally was probably a sergeant-brother but who in 1303 was accorded the senior status of conventual bailli (official in the Central Convent). Since the establishment of the Langues of the Knights Hospitaller in 1319, the Pilier (head) of the Langue of England (including Wales, Scotland and Ireland) was the order's Turcopolier; and in charge of the coastal defences of Rhodes and Malta.

== See also ==
- Varangian Guard, another foreign mercenary force in the Byzantine Empire.
- Mixobarbaroi, related concept within Byzantine society to denote ethnically and linguistically mixed populations including offspring of Turkic-Greek intermarriage
- Chepni, wandering Turkoman who entered service of Empire of Trebizond
- Gagauz people, Christianized Turkic people in Eastern Europe
- Constantine Melik, notable Seljuq Turk convert that served as Byzantine governor
