= William Weston (prior) =

English prior (c. 1470–1540)

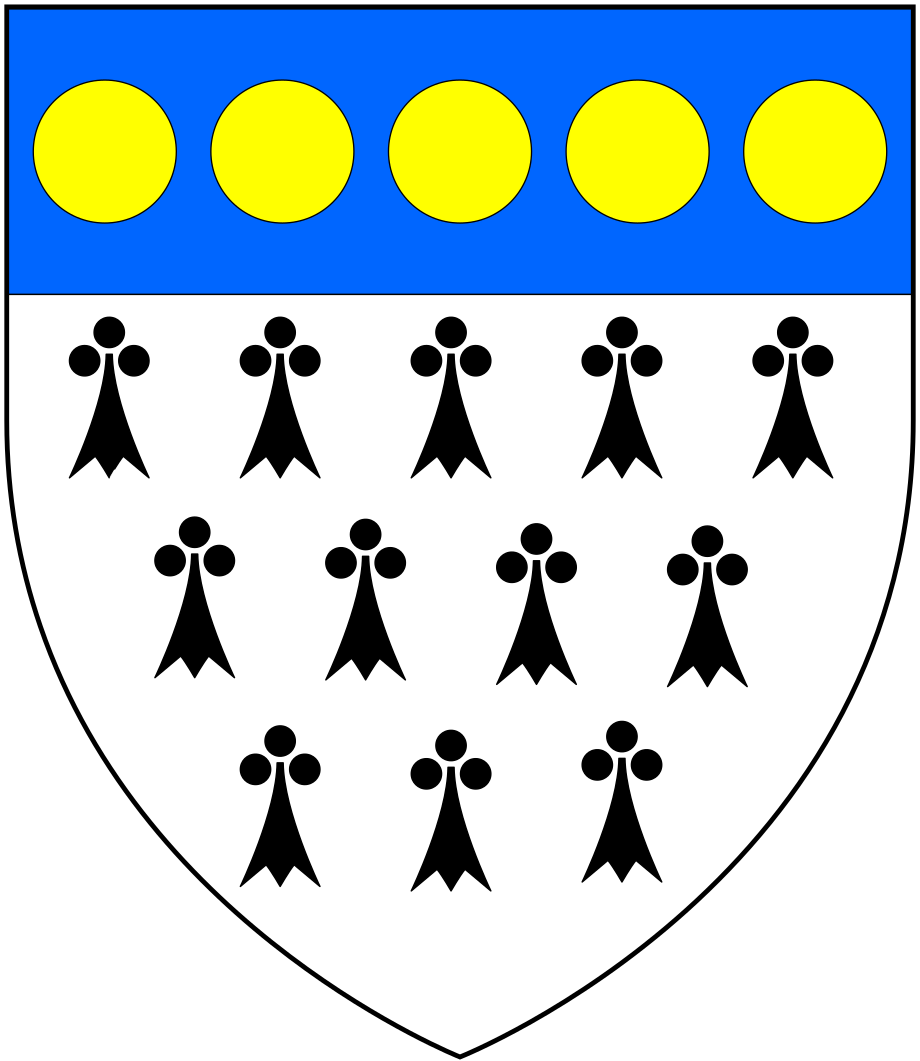
Arms of Weston: Ermine, on a chief azure five bezants

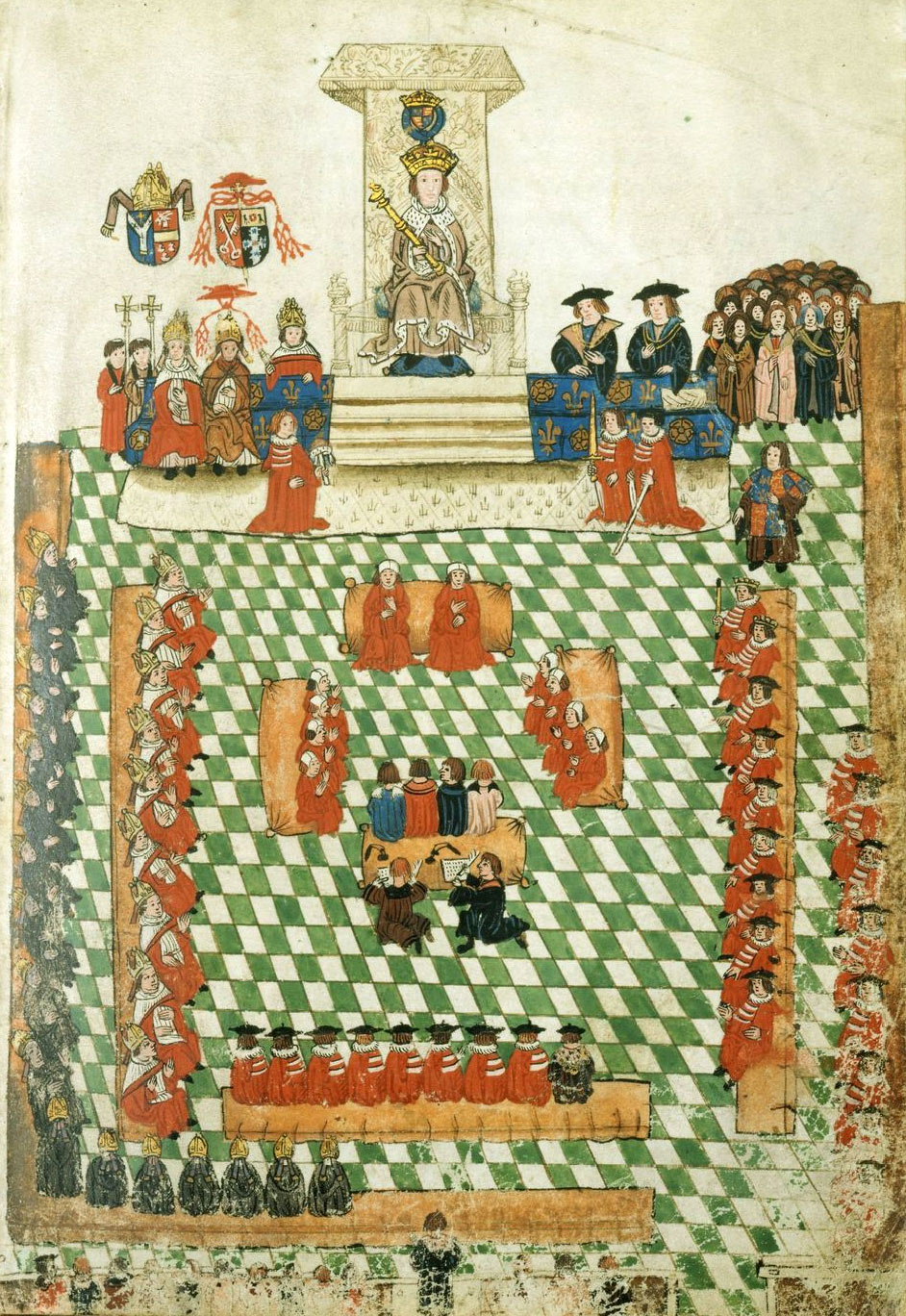
Opening of Parliament by Henry VIII at Bridewell in 1523; a contemporary illustration from the Wriothesley Garter Book. Weston, as Prior of the Order of St John, Premier Baron, is the figure dressed in black sitting at the right end of the crossbench with the barons, facing the king

Cadaver monument to Sir William Weston formerly in St Mary's Church, the Priory Church of St John, Clerkenwell, drawn before 1788. Today only the cadaver effigy survives. Arms of Weston quartering Camell above, with crest of a Saracen's head. With matrices of missing monumental brasses and decorated with crosses of the Order of St John

Sir William Weston (c. 1470 – 7 May 1540) was the last Prior of the Order of Knights of the Hospital of Saint John of Jerusalem in England before the Dissolution of the Monasteries, during the reign of King Henry VIII. (Note: see DNB articles Shelley, Sir Richard, and Tresham, Sir Thomas, d. 1559; and titular English priors, in most cases Italians by birth, continued to be appointed till the dissolution of the order in 1798 Clarke 1899, p. 377) As such he ranked as premier baron in the roll of peers. He is characterised as one of the influential adherents of the papacy. His cadaver effigy survives in the crypt of the Priory Church of St John, Clerkenwell in Middlesex (now in central London), the former headquarters of the Order.

== Origins ==
William Weston was born in about 1470, the second son of Edmund Weston of Boston, Lincolnshire, by his wife Catherine Camell, daughter and heiress of John Camell of Shapwick in Dorset. His brother was Sir Richard Weston (1465–1541) of Sutton Place in Surrey, a courtier of King Henry VIII and a diplomat who served as Governor of Guernsey, Treasurer of Calais and Under-Treasurer of the Exchequer.

His family had already been intimately connected with the Order of the Knights of St John. His uncle Sir John Weston had served as Lord Prior of England from 1476 to 1489 and two more of his uncles had held the post of "Turcopolier", or commander of the light cavalry, an office generally conferred on the most illustrious knights of the "English language", one of whom was probably the William Weston who defended Rhodes against the Turks in 1480.

== Career ==
In 1498, Weston was granted Ansty Preceptory in Wiltshire, and in 1507 Baddesley Preceptory in Hampshire. On 27 October 1508 he arrived at Calais on a diplomatic mission. In 1510 he was on the island of Rhodes where in 1522 he distinguished himself at its siege, being one of the few English knights who survived, and was himself wounded. After evacuating Rhodes the knights made for Crete, where early in 1523 Weston was appointed "Turcopolier" in place of Sir John Bouch, who had been slain during the siege. He was also placed in command of a ship in the Navy of the Order of Saint John known as the Great Carrack (Santa Anna), "the first iron-clad recorded in history...sheathed with metal and perfectly cannon-proof (with) room for five hundred men, and provisions for six months".

Also in 1523 Weston, with the universal consent of the English knights, was granted the right of succession to the priories of England and Ireland. In 1524 he was sent on an embassy to the court of King Henry VIII on behalf of the Order; on 27 June 1527, following the death of Prior Thomas Docwra, he was appointed Lord Prior of England, by bull of the Grand Master.

The Lord Prior had his headquarters at Clerkenwell Priory, on the edge of the City of London, and ranked as premier baron in the roll of peers. There was some difficulty over the appointment and a rumour was current that the King Henry intended, after having conferred the office on a favourite, to separate the English knights from the rest of the order, and to station them at Calais, his personal possession. The matter was settled by a personal visit to him of Grand Master Philippe Villiers de L'Isle-Adam, the heroic defender of Rhodes, following which Henry assented to the appointment of Sir William Weston and withdrew his first claim for a yearly tribute of £4,000 from the new Prior. In 1535 Weston was present at a ball given by Morette, the French ambassador.

== Death and burial ==
Weston died on 7 May 1540, the day on which the Order in England was dissolved. He reportedly collapsed on hearing the news but had suffered failing health for at least one year. A very large pension of £1,000 a year for life had been settled upon him at the dissolution, which clearly he never lived to enjoy. He was buried on the north side of the chancel of the church of the Nunnery of St Mary Clerkenwell, later transformed into St James's Church, Clerkenwell), with a monument and recumbent cadaver tomb effigy, described by John Weever in 1631 as "a faire marble tombe, with the portraiture of a dead man lying upon his shroud: the most artificially cut in stone that ever man beheld". In 1788, prior to the complete rebuilding of the church, the monument was dismantled and its parts dispersed. However, its cadaver effigy was preserved in the new church until 1931, when it was removed to its present location in the crypt of St John's church, the historic Priory Church of the Order of St John, which had been reacquired for use as a chapel by the revived order.

== See also ==
- List of the priors of St John of Jerusalem in England

== Sources ==
- Harrison, Frederic (1899). "III". Annals of an Old Manor House. London: Macmillan. pp. 82–88.
- Whittemore, Philip (2014). "Sir William Weston, last prior of the Order of St John of Jerusalem, d 1540 and his monument" (PDF). Transactions of the London and Middlesex Archaeological Society. 65: 271–82.

Attribution

- This article incorporates text from a publication now in the public domain: Clarke, Ernest (1899). "Weston, William (d.1540)". In Lee, Sidney (ed.). Dictionary of National Biography. Vol. 60. London: Smith, Elder & Co. pp. 377–278.
  - Letters and Papers of Henry VIII, ed. Brewer and Gairdner, passim;
  - Notes and Queries, 1st ser. xi. 201, and authorities there cited;
  - Hutchins's Dorset, ii. 553, iii. 676;
  - Porter's Hist. of the Knights of Malta, 1858, ii. 285, 290, 322, 323;
  - Taafe's Hist. of the Order of St. John of Jerusalem, 1852, iii. 148, 243, 276–81, iv, App. xxx;
  - Manning and Bray's Hist. of Surrey, i. 133;
  - Harrison's Annals of an old Manor House, 1893, pp. 66–71.
