= Museum of the Order of St John =

Museum in London

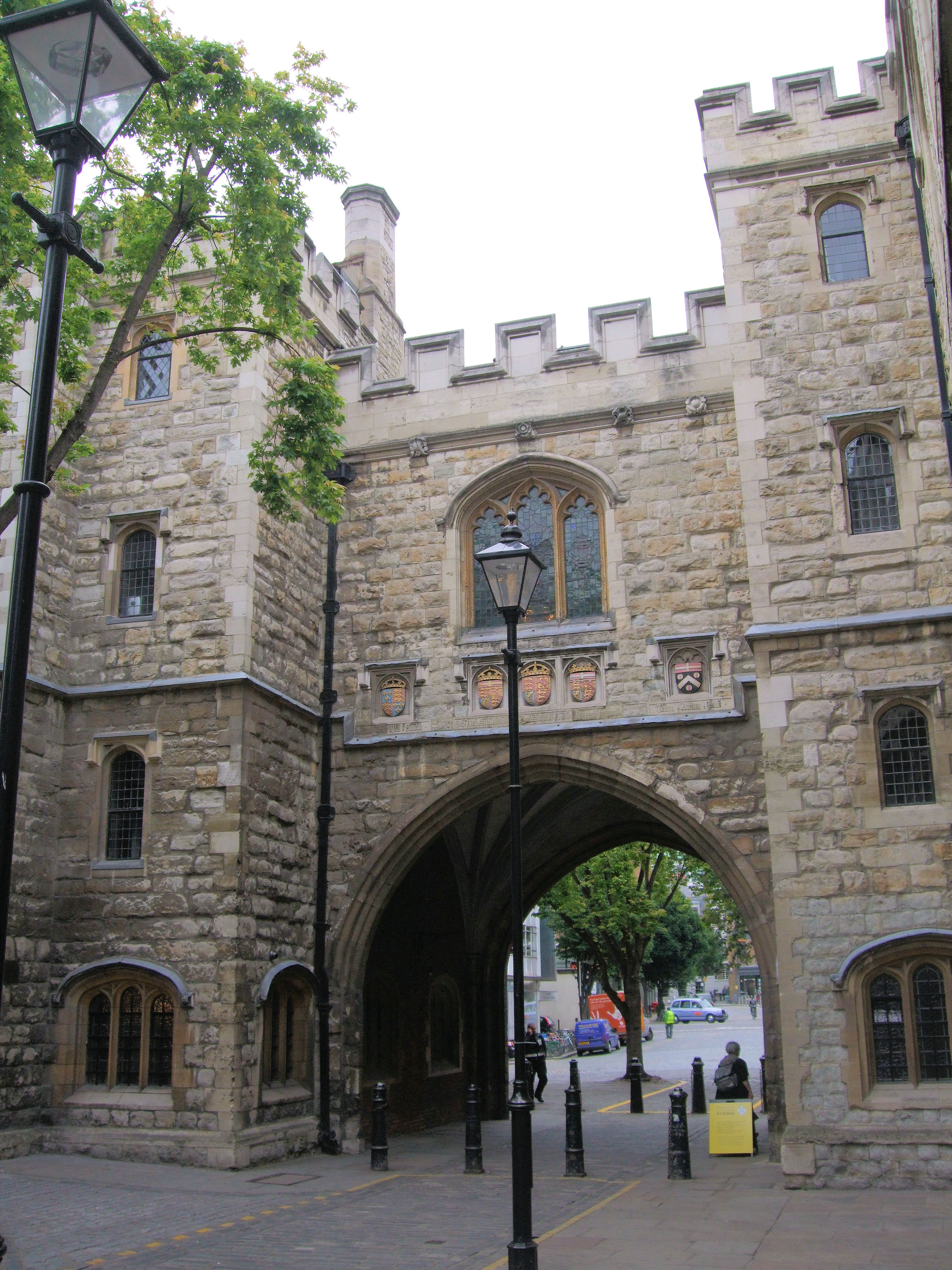
- St John's Gate, home of the museum

- Location within Central London
- Location: St John's Gate, Clerkenwell; London, EC1; United Kingdom
- Coordinates: 51.52195°N 0.10257°W
- Public transit access: Farringdon
- Website: museumstjohn.org.uk

The Museum of the Order of St John in Clerkenwell, London, tells the story of the Venerable Order of Saint John from its roots as a pan-European Order of Hospitaller Knights founded in Jerusalem during the Crusades, to its present commitment to providing first aid and care in the community through the St John Ambulance Brigade and running an Ophthalmic Hospital in Jerusalem. The museum is a member of the London Museums of Health & Medicine.

== Building ==
The Museum is based in St John's Gate, Clerkenwell, a 16th-century gatehouse in London, England that once formed the entrance to the Priory of Clerkenwell. This dates back to the 11th century and was once the English headquarters of the Order of St John. From here Hospitaller Knights went out to the Holy Land and later to Cyprus, Rhodes and Malta. They served in hospitals treating pilgrims, and fought to defend Christian interests in the Holy Land and the Mediterranean.

Tours take visitors to the oldest surviving part of the Medieval Priory, the Norman crypt, as well as the 16th century church above.

They then return to the Gate House, which after the Dissolution of the monasteries was put to many uses, with Shakespeare, Dr Johnson, Hogarth and Dickens all taking part in its story. The Gate was eventually bought back by the Order in the late nineteenth century, and is now beautifully decorated with heraldry, stained glass, gilding and carving to create glowing interiors, designed by John Oldrid Scott. Here visitors can see the fine furniture and painting collections.

The Museum in the Gate House tells the story of the history of the Order of St John and St John Ambulance. The Museum completed a renovation in November 2010. It was supported by funders such as the Heritage Lottery Fund and was designed by leading architects Donald Insall Associates, who had previously written the building's Conservation Plan. Exhibition design company Metaphor undertook the internal exhibit design. This redevelopment has given the Order's internationally significant collection the context it needs, including updating interpretative techniques, bringing more of the collections out of storage, and improving conservation conditions.

== Order of St John collections ==
The collections of artefacts from the history of the Order of St John are extremely varied, covering all aspects of the history of an Order founded in the eleventh century and operating in most European countries.

There are archaeological finds, architectural fragments and social history material relating to the Priory site; seals and numismatics, including an important collection of Crusader coins; arms and armour, mainly European plate armour but also an example of Turkish Ottoman mail; drug jars, mortars and weights from the Hospitallers' pharmacy in Malta; decorative arts (portrait medals, ceramics, glass, silver, furniture, jewellery, insignia, textiles, ecclesiastical vestments) reflecting the tastes of the European aristocrats who joined the Order and became significant patrons of the arts.

The painting collection includes religious art, particularly images of patron saint of the Order, St John the Baptist, portraits of Grand Masters, Knights and clergy, sea and landscapes, depicting naval battles and views of Malta; prints and drawings include portraits of the Knights, topographical views and maps showing the famous fortifications on their island homes, as well as prints of the English Priory and the surrounding area of Clerkenwell. It also includes works by the oil painter Alix Jennings of the Second World War.

== St John Ambulance collections ==
St John Ambulance has a history spanning over 125 years and covering over 40 countries worldwide. It was founded by the British Order of St John and inspired by the medical traditions of the Hospitallers. Its story is told in a new exhibition.

Equipment ranges in size from examples of early ambulance transport to a Victorian nurse's miniature first aid kit. There are training books written in numerous languages and first aid information comes in many forms, from cigarette cards to pop-up books and even on bandages.

Uniform includes ceremonial attire, a 1922 cadet uniform and A.R.P gas suit, and posters and advertisements feature uniform of many periods. The collection of medals, trophies and decorative certificates give a real sense of members' achievements and include one certificate made by a forger inside a prisoner-of-war camp. Banners and textiles commemorate special St John occasions.

Personal memorabilia tell what it was like to belong to the movement in different times and places. Nurse Nesbit's cartoons record the lighter moments of serving in a First World War hospital. In an album, Lyn Brown put down her reactions as one of the first people to enter the newly liberated Belsen camp in 1945.

The film archive provides a glimpse into SJA's involvement with the film industry and a huge photographic collection gives insights into individual lives and social change, as well as the changing organisation. Oral histories, particularly strong on the Second World War, also cover topics as diverse as first aid in the depression of the 1930s, setting up a division in Zanzibar in the 1950s and the work of a welfare officer in the Gulf War of 1991.

== Opening hours ==
- Monday - Saturday, 10 am - 5 pm
- Tours - Tuesday, Friday and Saturday, 11 am and 2.30 pm

== Getting there ==
- by train - Farringdon station (Tube and Thameslink trains) is the nearest station, 5 minutes walk from the museum.
- by car - Pay and Display parking spaces are available in St John's Square. Parking restrictions apply Mon-Fri 9 am - 6.30 pm, Sat 9 am - 1.30 pm
- by bus - Farringdon Road (63), Clerkenwell Road (55, 243)

== See also ==
- Healthcare in London
- St John's Gate, Clerkenwell
- Service Medal of the Order of St John
- Insignia of the Venerable Order of St John
- Museum of the Order of St John in Ontario
