= Clerkenwell Priory =

Former Catholic priory in Clerkenwell, London, England

Coordinates: 51°31′22″N 0°6′12″W

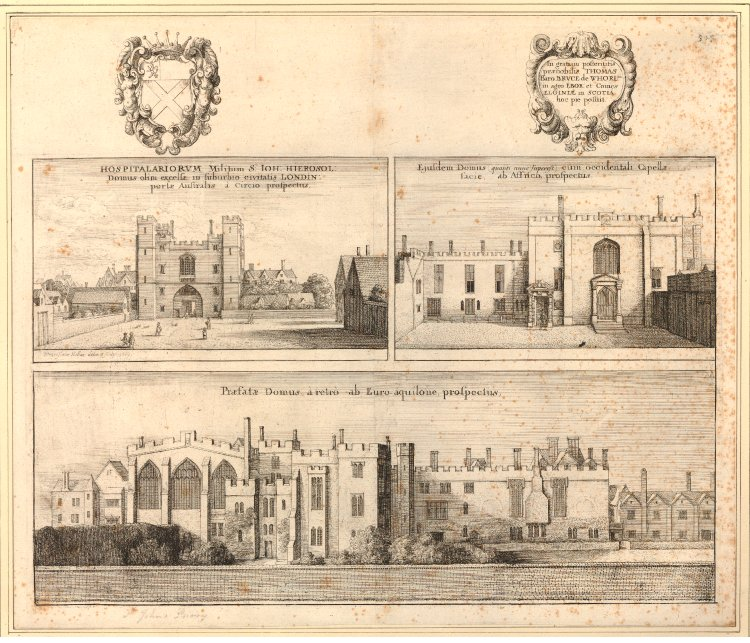
Three views of the Priory of St John of Jerusalem in Clerkenwell by Wenceslaus Hollar (1661)

Clerkenwell Priory was a priory of the Monastic Order of the Knights Hospitallers of St. John of Jerusalem, in present Clerkenwell, London. The Order observed the Rule of Saint Augustine. The Priory was the residence of the Hospitallers' Grand Prior in England, and was thus their English headquarters. Its great landholding – until Protestant monarch Edward VI – was in the ancient parish of Marylebone, in the now Inner London area known as St John's Wood. The Priory had farmed out the land on agricultural tenancies as a source of produce and income.

== History ==
=== Foundation ===
Jordan Briset, a Norman baron, founded the Priory in the reign of Henry II (along with a Benedictine nunnery alongside), and its church was consecrated by the Patriarch of Jerusalem, Heraclius, in 1185. Henry held an aulic council at the Priory, at which Heraclius convinced the king that he should send English troops to a new crusade but was unable to persuade the barons to allow Henry to lead them personally (even when Henry was offered the crown of Jerusalem in return, and even after Heraclius shouted in a rage "Here is my head, here is my head; treat me, if you like, as you did my brother Thomas. It is a matter of indifference to me whether I die by your orders or in Syria by the hands of the infidels; for you are worse than a Saracen.") Thomas Malory was one of those later buried in this church.

=== Medieval heyday ===
Matthew Paris recounts a party of Hospitallers setting out from the Priory in 1237 for Crusade thus:

the Hospitallers sent their prior, Theodoric, a German by birth, and a most clever knight, with a body of other knights and stipendiary attendants, and a large sum of money, to the assistance of the Holy Land. They having made all arrangements, set out from their house at Clerkenwell, and proceeded in good order, with about thirty shields uncovered, with spears raised, and preceded by their banner, through the midst of the City, towards the bridge, that they might obtain the blessings of the spectators, and, bowing their heads with their cowls lowered, commended themselves to the prayers of all.

This was the only Hospitaller priory in England not to be able to pay its own way, due to its having to support and entertain the Grand Prior and large number of pensioners and guests from the court – in 1337 alone it spent more than its entire revenue (its whole revenue was at least £8,000). Royal guests at the Priory included King John in 1212, Edward, Prince of Wales (later Edward I) and his wife Eleanor of Castile in 1265., Henry IV in 1399 and Henry V in 1413.

=== Fire and reconstruction ===
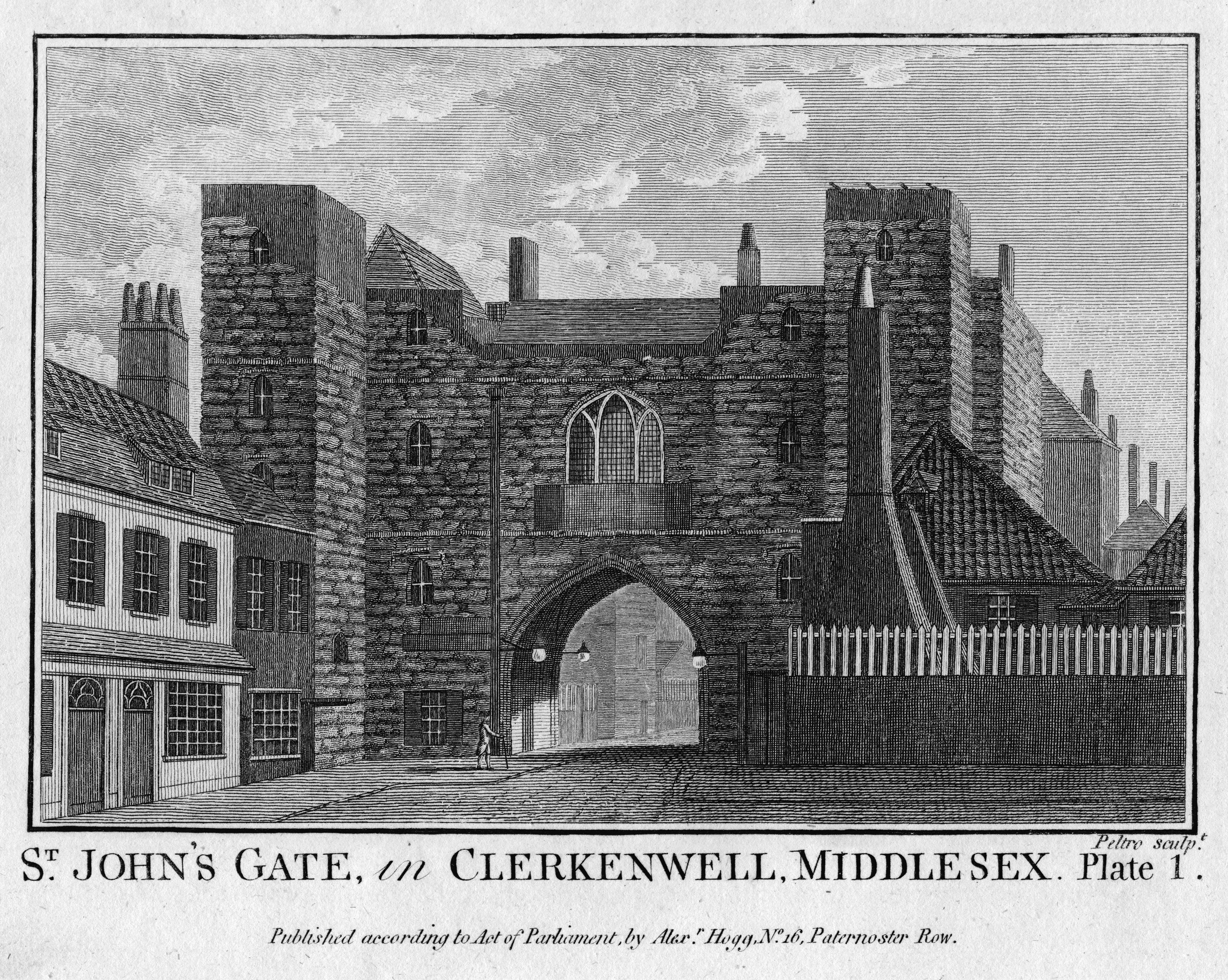
18th-century view of the South Gate (now known as St John's Gate)

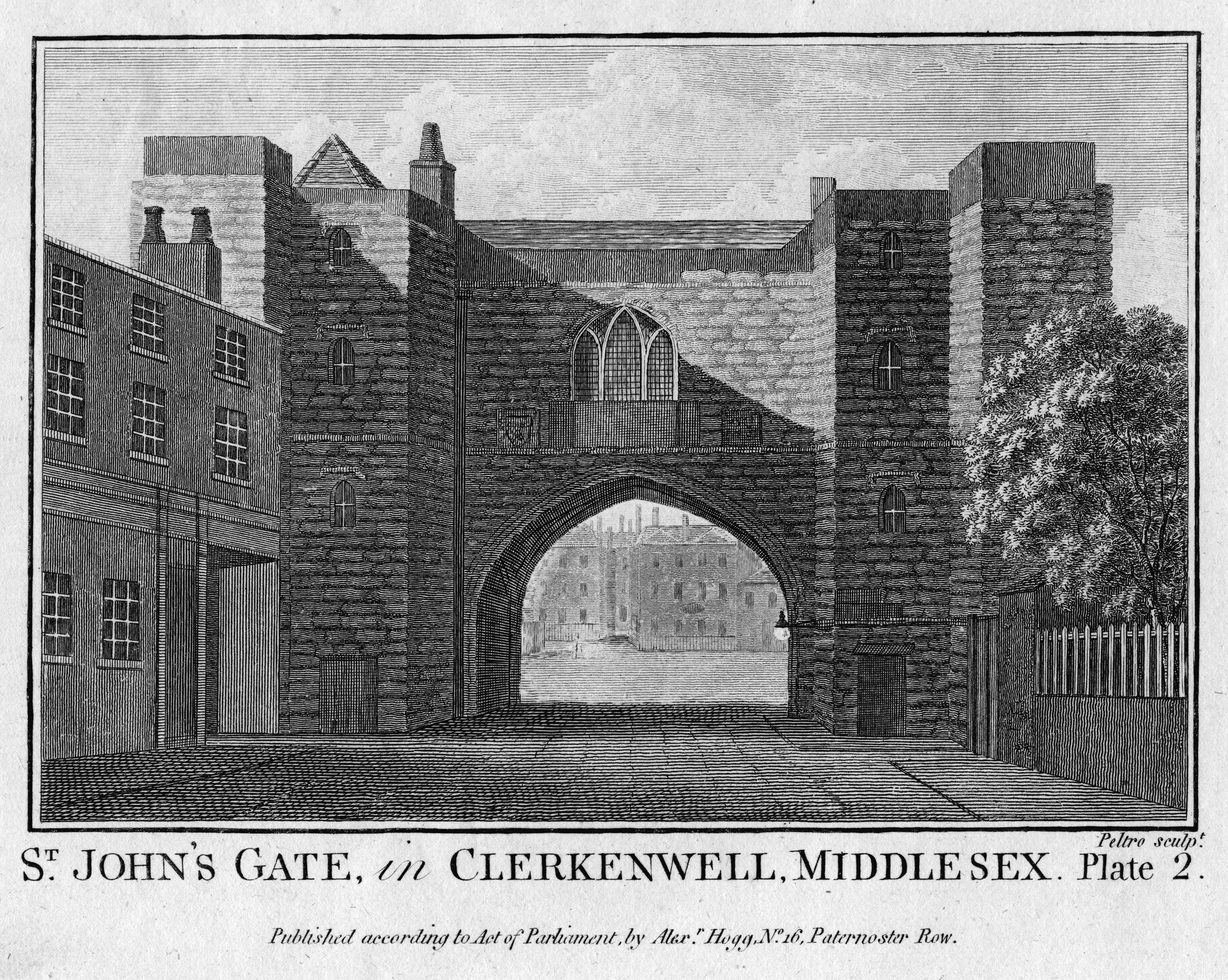
Alternative view of the South Gate

Though additions were made to the complex in Edward I's reign, the mob of the Peasants' Revolt burned it down. Nevertheless, a royal council was held there in 1485, at which Richard III publicly decided against his earlier plan to marry his niece, Elizabeth of York.

It was only fully rebuilt by 1504, the date of completion for the grand south gate erected by Sir Thomas Docwra (the penultimate Grand Prior, also buried in the Priory church). William Camden wrote that the rebuilt complex resembled a palace, and had in it a very fair church, and a tower-steeple raised to a great height, with so fine workmanship that it was a singular beauty and ornament to the city.

=== Dissolution ===
In 1502 Henry VII of England was chosen Protector of the Hospitallers, but he did not provide them the men and money (for their defence of Rhodes against Suleyman the Magnificent) that he had promised. After the island finally fell the Order's Grand Master, L'Isle Adam, was received by Henry's son Henry VIII. At his request, Henry confirmed the privileges of the knights, though he later dissolved Clerkenwell and the rest of the order as part of his wider Dissolution since they "maliciously and traitorously upheld the 'Bishop of Rome' to be Supreme Head of Christ's Church" and thus intended to subvert "the good and godly laws and statues of this realm." The king granted the last prior, William Weston, and the order's other officers small annuities, and so they did not oppose their house's dissolution, and most of the Knights retired to their stronghold of Malta, though three who did not were executed by Henry as traitors (one hung and quartered, the others beheaded). Henry granted the Priory church to John Dudley, 1st Duke of Northumberland for £1,000, and used it and the rest of the complex to store his hunting-nets. In 1540 ten newly made serjeants-at-law hosted a great banquet at St John's for London's mayor and aldermen and for all the Lords and Commons, at which rings were handed out to the guests, and, according to Stow, at another of these feasts in 1531, thirty-four great beeves were consumed, besides thirty-seven dozen pigeons and fourteen dozen swans.

=== Edward VI to James I ===
Henry's son Edward VI granted the Priory's remaining lands to other noblemen. John Stow reports that, in the third year of Edward's reign, "the [Priory] church for the most part, to wit, the body and side aisles, with the great bell-tower (a most curious piece of workmanship, graven, gilt, and inameled, to the great beautifying of the city, and passing all other that I have seen), was under mined and blown up with gunpowder; the stone thereof was employed in building of the Lord Protector's house in the Strand." Other stone from the Priory was used to construct the porch of the church of All Hallows Lombard Street (corner of Gracechurch Street, demolished 1937), and by Fuller's time the choir of the Priory church was in "a pitiful plight".

Mary I (who had often stayed at the priory buildings during Edward's reign, making extravagant progresses with Catholic nobles from there to her brother's court at Whitehall Palace) revived the order and restored its possessions, whilst her Archbishop of Canterbury, Cardinal Pole, built a new west front on the Priory church and made repairs to its side chapels. The church was sufficiently restored for the Merchant Taylors Guild to celebrate mass there, during which offerings were made and the choir was hung with tapestries. However, the order was once again sent back to Malta on the accession of Elizabeth I. During her reign her Master of the Revels, Edmund Tylney, stayed in the Priory buildings, as did all his tailors, embroiderers, painters, carpenters, and the stage crews for court plays and masques – the great hall of the complex was used for rehearsals. After the Union of the Crowns of England and Scotland, James VI and I granted the buildings to Lord Aubigny (removing the Revels Office to St Peter's Hill), and it later passed to Sir William Cecil then to the Earl of Elgin.

=== 17th century ===
In 1623 Joseph Hall, later Bishop of Exeter and Norwich, reopened the repaired choir and, in Charles I's reign, the Earl of Elgin turned the church into the Aylesbury Chapel, as his private chapel.

It later became a Presbyterian meeting-house, remaining so until 1710. Its pews were ripped out by the Sacheverell rioters to burn outside the nearby house of Bishop Gilbert Burnet. The chapel was enlarged in 1721, and in 1723 was bought for £3,000 by the commissioners for building fifty new churches to become the parish church of St John Clerkenwell.

=== Today ===
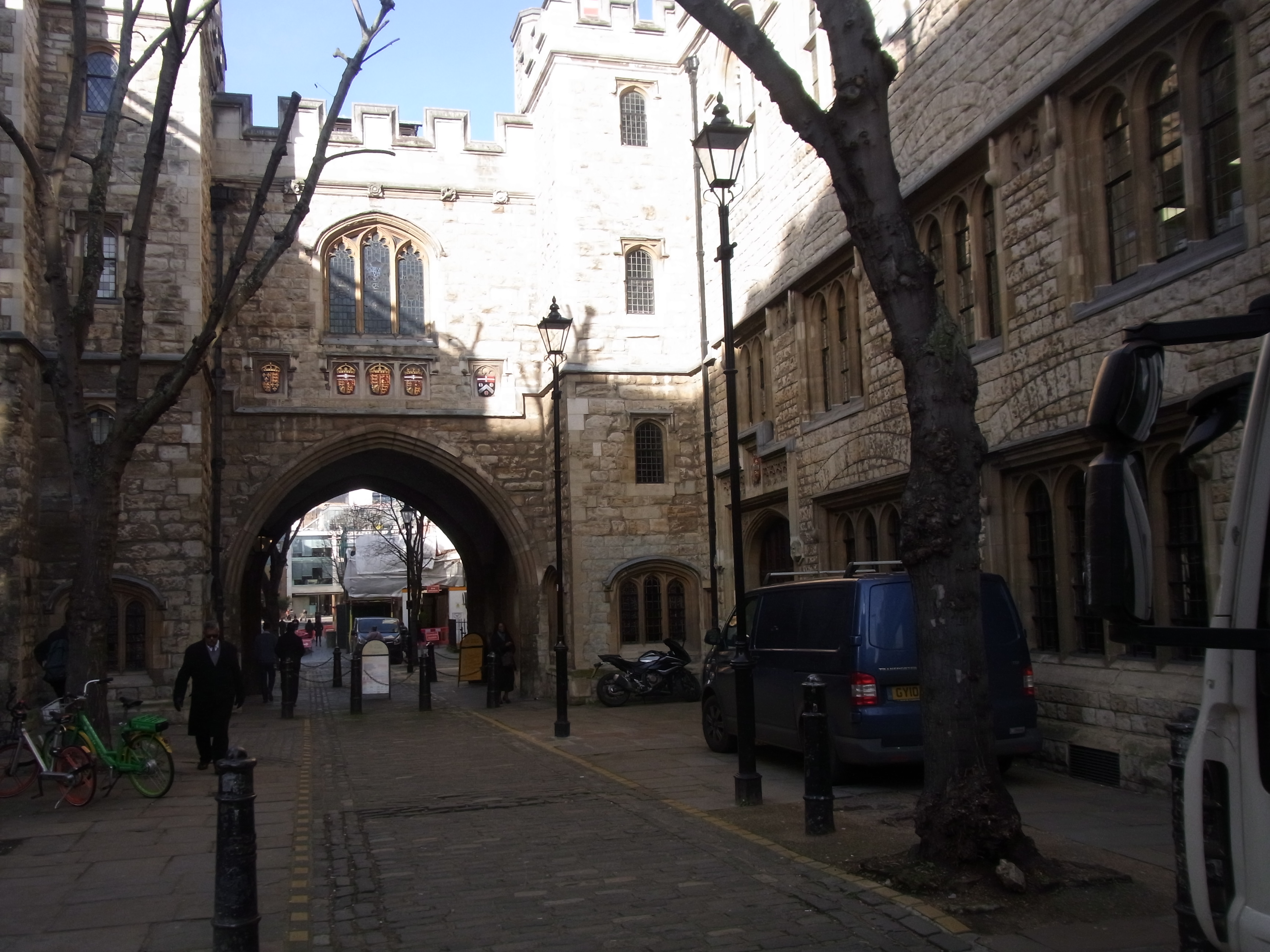
Clerkenwell Priory of the Order of Saint John, in January 2020

In 1878 one of the large painted windows from the old church still survived at the parish church's east end, as did remains of Prior Docwra's church in the south and east walls, and capitals and rib mouldings of the former church underpinned the pews. All that remains of the complex now is Docwra's south gate, largely reconstructed in Victorian times and now known as St John's Gate, in St John's Square, and an Early English crypt remaining beneath the neighbouring parish church of St John Clerkenwell. The priory arch stone found its way to Exmouth in Devon where it was incorporated into the structure of the local branch of the St John Ambulance Brigade (see photos and more detail).

== See also ==
- List of the priors of St John of Jerusalem in England
