= William Pettit Griffith =

English architect and antiquary (1815–1884)

William Pettit Griffith (7 July 1815 – 14 September 1884) was an English architect and antiquarian. Born in Clerkenwell in London, he had a particular interest in the area, and much of his work of restoring and designing buildings took place there. He was a member of several learned societies.

== Life ==
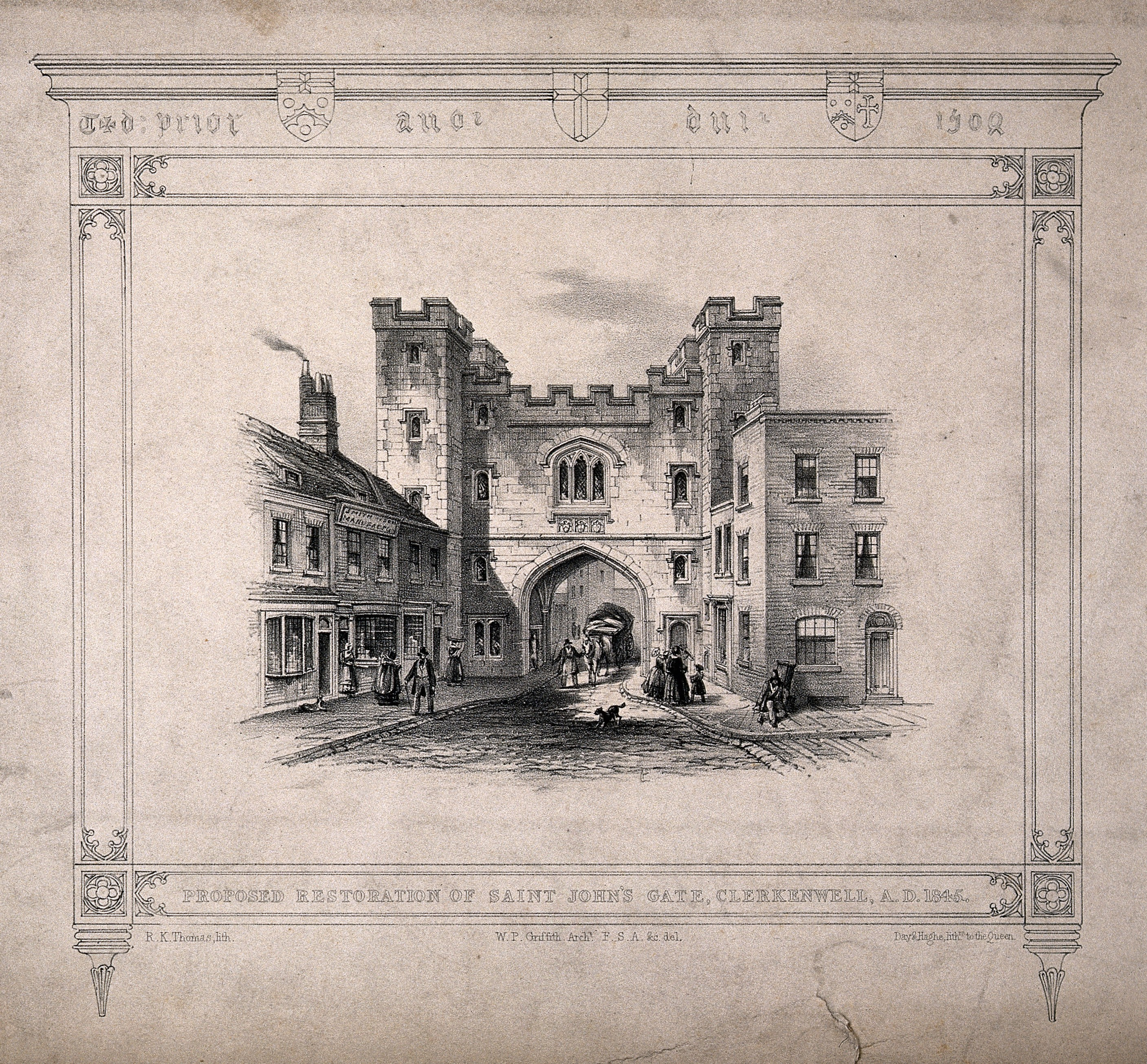
St John's Gate. Lithograph by R. K. Thomas after W. P. Griffith, 1845.

Griffith, son of the architect John William Griffith, was born in 1815 at 9 St John's Square, Clerkenwell, where his father resided for more than half a century. He was brought up to the profession of an architect, and before he was twenty was writing notes in J. C. Loudon's Architectural Magazine. He continued these notes, under the signature "Tyro, Wilmington Square", from 1835 to 1837, besides contributing original articles and designs in 1836. In 1839 and 1840 he exhibited architectural designs in the Royal Academy, and in 1840–1–2 watercolour drawings of fonts and portions of old churches at Hendon, Broxbourne, St Albans and other places, in the galleries of the Society of British Artists.

On 12 May 1842 he was elected Fellow of the Society of Antiquaries of London; and between 1856 and 1858 exhibited architectural fragments in connection with his work of restoration at St John's Gate, Clerkenwell.

=== Papers read to learned societies ===
He was elected FRIBA on 14 June 1847, and on that evening made some remarks as to "The Principles which guided the architects in constructing the Minsters, Cathedrals, and Churches of England". In 1855 he was awarded the institute's silver medal for an "Essay on the Principles or Laws which govern the Formation of Architectural Decorations and Ornaments"; the manuscript, illustrated by neatly executed ink and sepia drawings, is in the library of the Royal Institute of British Architects. In connection with it are four sheets of drawings, "Classification of Mediaeval Ornaments" and "Designs for Mediaeval Ornaments from the Vegetable Kingdom. Arranged geometrically and conventionalised".

At the chapter meetings of the College of the Freemasons of the Church he communicated, on 12 August and 9 September 1845, papers "On the Ancient Baptismal Fonts of England" (drawings of nine ancient fonts which he had made in 1838-9 were engraved on one sheet by Webb & Son); on 10 February 1846, "On the Different Kinds of Stone employed in the Edifices of Babylon, Egypt, Greece, Rome, and Great Britain"; and 13 October 1846, "On the Hagioscope or Squint in the Ancient Parochial Churches of England".

He was made an honorary member of the Bedfordshire Architectural Society in 1847, and read at Elstow on 25 May 1852 "Suggestions for a more Perfect and Beautiful Period of Gothic Architecture" (published in pamphlet form in 1855). Elected honorary member of the Liverpool Architectural Society 1849, he communicated to its meetings: 15 April 1857, "Proportion its Practical Application to Architecture and the Fine Arts"; 1860, "Of the Resources of Design in the Natural Kingdom"; 1863, "Of the Influence of Fashion in Architecture". At the Surrey Archaeological Society he read on 30 June 1854, "On the Ancient Baptismal Fonts of England": in 1856 was made an honorary member; 12 June 1856 communicated "An Architectural Notice of Archbishop Whitgift's Hospital at Croydon"; and 12 May 1858, "An Architectural Notice of the Nave of St. Saviour's Church, Southwark".

Griffith died a poor man at 3 Isledon Road, Highbury, London, on 14 September 1884.

== Works ==
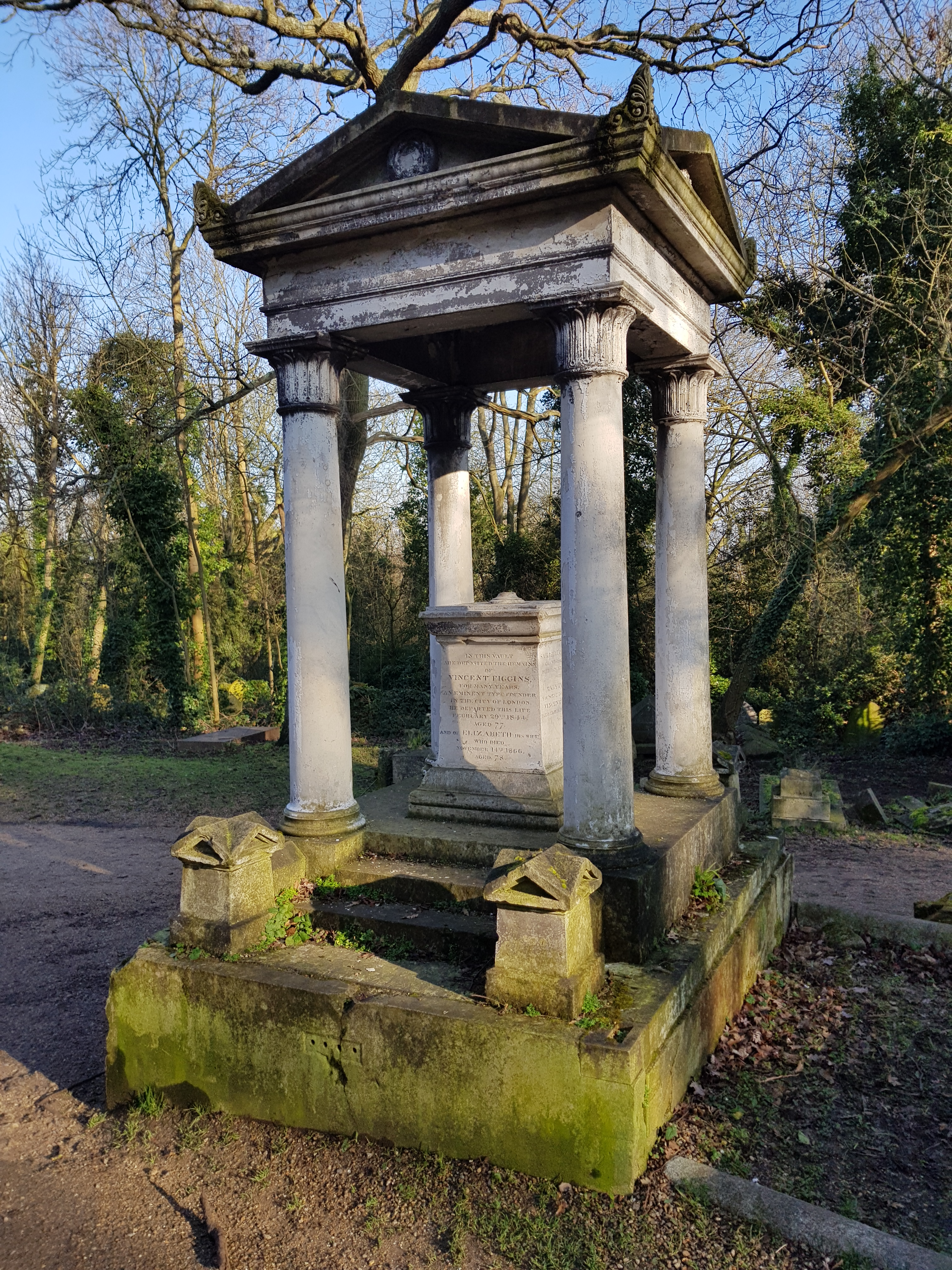
Monument to Vincent Figgins, by Griffith

Griffith designed, about 1844, the monument to Vincent Figgins in Nunhead Cemetery (now Grade II-listed).

Other works include: The restoration of St. John's Church, Clerkenwell, 1845; the restoration of St John's Gate, 1845–6; the rebuilding of the spire (1849) and the erection of a font (1851) for St James's Church, Clerkenwell. The drawing of the font was engraved.

He designed the Cherry Tree Tavern, Clerkenwell, 1852; the Goldsmiths' and Jewellers' Annuity Institution Asylum, Hackney, 1853 (the exterior view engraved); planned additions and alterations to the Clerkenwell Vestry Hall, 1857; designed many parochial and ragged schools 1858–62; and adapted Melrose Hall, Putney Heath, for the Royal Hospital for Incurables 1864–5.

He directed the erection of Messrs. Rivington's printing-office, St John's House, Clerkenwell, 1866, and the repairs to and partial renewal of the tower and porch of the church of St. Sepulchre, Holborn, 1873; designed the House of Detention, Kingston-on-Thames; and the repairs to the tower of Kingston Church.

Griffith was keenly interested in the antiquities of Clerkenwell, made a special study of the old priory of St. John of Jerusalem, and spared no pains to avert the threatened destruction of St. John's Gate, helping to raise a public subscription for its restoration. Relics of both priory and gate, some of which he brought to light, were deposited in the Architectural Museum, and at South Kensington Museum.

== Publications ==
Griffith published:

1. The Geometrical Proportion of Architecture. 1843.
2. The Natural System of Architecture, 1845.
3. Ancient Gothic Churches, 3 parts, 1847–8–52.
4. Architectural Botany (extracted from part iii. of Ancient Gothic Churches), 1852.
5. Suggestions for a more Perfect and Beautiful Period of Gothic Architecture, 1855.

In his writings Griffith mainly endeavoured to show that "the geometrical proportions pervading Greek and Gothic architecture are in principle based upon nature's works" (Suggestions for a more Beautiful Period of Gothic Architecture, p. 6), and that "by the employment of regular figures and their multiples in architecture, we always ensure an equal distribution of parts, which also exists in the vegetable kingdom" (Ancient Gothic Churches, pt. ii. p. 26).
