= Metaphor (designers) =

London-based design firm

- Type: Private company
- Industry: Designer and Master planner
- Founded: 2000; 26 years ago
- Founder: Stephen Greenberg and Rachel Morris
- Headquarters: London, United Kingdom
- Area served: Worldwide
- Key people: Kara Dickinson (Managing Director)
- Services: Museum master planning, architecture, design, story-planning, text writing, content research, financial sustainability, brief writing, facilitating workshops, consultation, and working with funders.
- Website: www.metaphor-design.co.uk/about

Metaphor is a British design firm based in London that specialises in museum and exhibition spaces re-designs. It provides master planning, exhibition design and architecture design for existing museums, galleries and other exhibition spaces.

== History ==
=== Foundation ===
The company was established in 2000 by Stephen Greenberg and Rachel Morris, Metaphor specializes in the re-design of museums, palaces, forts, landscapes, and country houses through master planning and design.

=== Projects 2000 - 2007 ===
In 2000 Metaphor's work in museums began with the master plan of the Victoria and Albert Museum (V & A). From 2003 to 2011, Metaphor was the master planner and lead designer at the Grand Egyptian Museum in Giza, Cairo. It is one of the largest planned archaeological museums in the world.

Metaphor first worked at the British Museum when it designed the exhibition on Michelangelo in 2005. At the time, it broke the museum's audience records, with 160,000 people seeing it. The First Emperor: China’s Terracotta Warriors at the British Museum in London. Metaphor used the curved walls of the Round Reading Room to hold projections, acting as a theatrical backdrop. Rachel Campbell-Johnston said that "exhibition designers and curators have to work hard to create a sense of spectacle. But they succeed brilliantly. The museum’s great Round Reading Room has been temporarily adapted into an atmospheric show space". The exhibition was seen by 850,000 people, 37% of whom had never been to the British Museum before.

=== Projects 2007 - 2020 ===
In 2007, Metaphor designed the Surreal Things exhibition at the V & A. Stephen Bayley, writing for The Observer, called it "comprehensive, fascinating, engaging and instructive". [Rachel Campbell-Johnston], writing for The Times, said 'the psychological mood starts to possess you'. The exhibition was redesigned to appear at the Guggenheim Museum Bilbao, running from 2007 to 2008. It was seen by 575,000 visitors, making it one of the most successful V & A touring exhibition ever.

Opening in 2009. Metaphor redesigned 32 permanent galleries at the Ashmolean Museum in Oxford. In 2010, Metaphor planned, renovated, and displayed the Museum of the Order of St John in Clerkenwell. It tells the story of the Knights of the Order of St John, the Crusades, and their later history.

In 2011, the Holburne Museum in Bath reopened, after a complete re-design by Metaphor. Metaphor displayed the central collection as if reflecting the mind of its eccentric 18th-century collector. In 2013, Metaphor redesigned the Olympic Museum in Lausanne, a museum of the renewal of the Olympics by Pierre de Coubertin and the Olympic Legacy. It also designed and curated the Parc Olympique, including new routes, sight lines, welcome sequences, and lighting.

=== Company relaunch 2020 - Present ===
In 2020 the company was relaunched with Kara Dickinson as Managing Director.

In 2022, Metaphor created a new visitor experience for the Old Royal Naval College in Greenwich.

== Heritage ==
Metaphor has undertaken many projects in the wider cultural and heritage sector, including with National Trust properties, Historic Royal Palaces, and Wordsworth Trust. Clients have included Hampton Court Palace, Fountains Abbey, Wordsworth Trust, Hardwick Hall Country Park, Coughton Court, Winchester Cathedral, Winchester College, and Tyntesfield.

== Museum of Marco Polo ==
Metaphor curated a website called The Museum of Marco Polo, which explored what a Museum was and the changing relationship between the physical museum space and the virtual visitor. It includes the History of the Museum, and an explanation of how The Museum of Marco Polo came to be located on the island of Büyükada, near Istanbul. It is illustrated by the award-winning graphic novelist Isabel Greenberg.
