= St John Clerkenwell =

Coordinates: 51°31′23″N 0°6′11″W

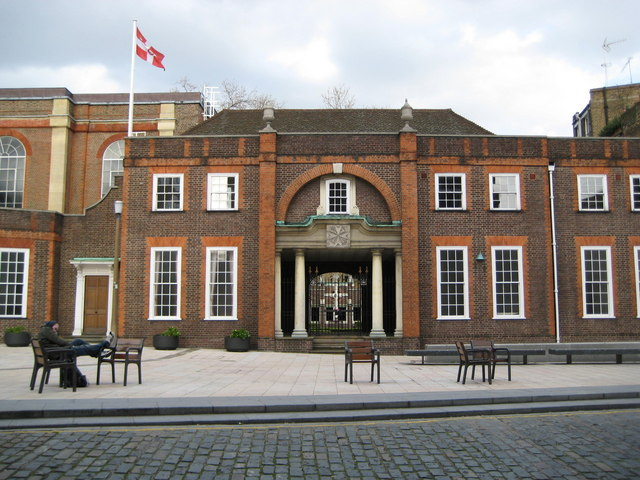
St John's Clerkenwell's Georgian-style façade with the Garden of Remembrance behind and the Priory banner flying above

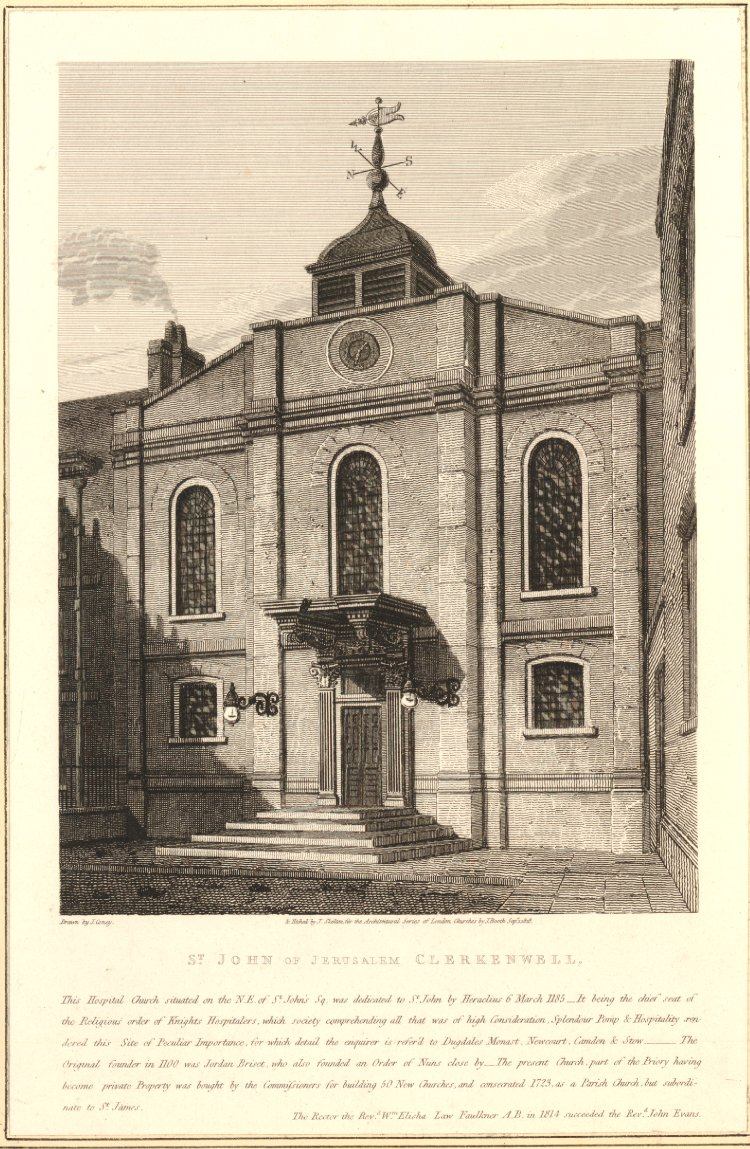
West door of St John's Church; engraver Joseph John Skelton (1818).

St John Clerkenwell is a former parish church in Clerkenwell, London, and now the priory church of the Order of St John.

Originally part of the medieval St John's Priory, in 1931 it ceased to be a parish church and was merged with the neighbouring parish of St James', Clerkenwell.

A modest rectangular, light-brick rebuild of the former priory, it now serves as the chapel of the order where the banners of Knights and Dames Grand Cross of St John are displayed and its investitures are held.

== Sites ==
=== St John property in Clerkenwell ===
A chapel, crypt, garden of remembrance, and narrow Georgian entrance building alongside are owned by the Most Venerable Order of St John, which was established in 1888 by Queen Victoria and supports St John Ambulance.

=== St John's Gardens, Benjamin Street ===
A small public garden is a block south-west, beyond the order's museum and other small retail outlets and professional offices. This replaced the Victorian enlarged version of the church.

== History ==
=== Queen Anne church ===
The crumbling structure was purchased and conserved by early 18th-century London's partly successful Commission for Building Fifty New Churches.

=== Victorian restoration and conservation ===
St John's Church was lightly restored and improved by William Pettit Griffith in 1845. One of the large stained glass windows at the east (chancel) end was surviving by 1878, as were remains of Thomas Docwra's pre-Reformation church in the south and east walls, and capitals and rib mouldings underpinning the pews.

In 1868 its living, held by the Revd William Dawson, was a rectory valued £260, in the patronage of the Lord Chancellor.

=== St John's Church pre- and post-WWII ===
In 1931, because of falling attendances, the parish was united with that of St James', Clerkenwell, when St John's ceased to be a parish church, being reconsecrated by the Crown as the chapel of the Order of St John

St James', the larger, successor Victorian church, 150 metres to the south-west, was largely gutted by bombing during The Blitz in 1941.

=== Reconstruction of the old chapel ===
The Order of St John's replacement chapel was constructed from 1951 to 1958 by the architects John Seely and Paul Paget, with the crypt of the medieval building surviving in the present structure.

The outline of the round church consecrated in 1185 is marked out in St John's Square in front of St John's Clerkenwell; to the south of the church is the garden of remembrance that occupies the site of a 16th-century chapel.

== See also ==
- St John Street, London

== Bibliography ==
- King, C. R. B. (1898). "The Crypt of the Priory Church of St. John, at Clerkenwell". Transactions of the Bristol and Gloucestershire Archaeological Society. 21: 168–174.
- Temple, Philip, ed. (2008). "St John's Church and St John's Square". South and East Clerkenwell. Survey of London. Vol. 46. New Haven, London: English Heritage. pp. 115–41. ISBN 9780300137279.
