= William Rogers (engraver) =

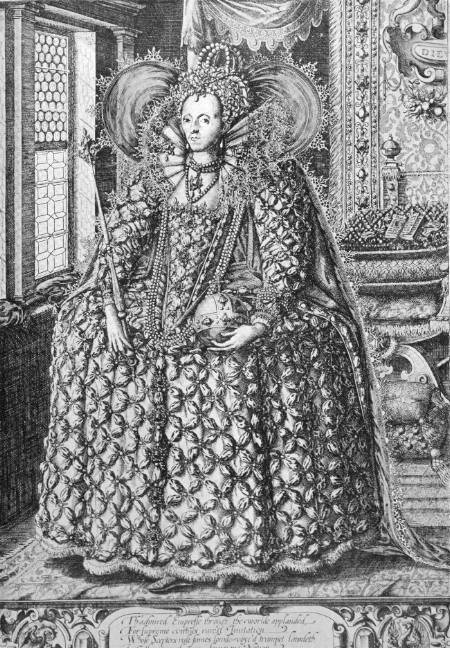
Queen Elizabeth Standing in a Room with a Lattice Window, figure of the queen after a drawing by Isaac Oliver, c. 1592

William Rogers (born c. 1545, active c. 1589–1604) was an English engraver. A Citizen of the City of London – one of his surviving engravings is signed Anglus et Civis Lond(oniensis). – he is the first English craftsman known to have practised engraving and the greatest portrait engraver of the Tudor period. The English were extremely late in coming to printmaking, though several artists from the thriving Flemish industry had worked in England already; the engraved print had been invented over 150 years before Rogers began to produce them. Rogers was also a goldsmith, and presumably acquired his technique in that context. His portrait style reflects Flemish models, while his backgrounds are often "overloaded with ornament" that is "redolent of the goldsmith's shop".

Rogers is known for his engraved portraits of Queen Elizabeth I of England, which are very scarce. Eliza Triumphans (1589), celebrating the defeat of the Spanish Armada in 1588, shows Elizabeth surrounded by the allegorical symbols of empire common to her portraiture at this time. Queen Elizabeth Standing in a Room with a Lattice Window, one of the best-known Tudor engravings, is based on a drawing of the queen by the miniaturist Isaac Oliver; the densely ornamented setting is probably the invention of Rogers.

Elizabeth I as Rosa Electa, of which the two surviving impressions are in the Bodleian Library at Oxford University and the British Museum, is undated but can be assigned to the later years of Elizabeth's reign by the style of the costume. The portrait depicts the Queen surrounded by roses, symbolising the Tudor union of the houses of York and Lancaster.

Rogers also engraved a version of the large allegorical picture of Henry VIII and his family attributed to Lucas de Heere, now at Sudeley Castle. Rogers' print, of which only three impressions are known, shows Elizabeth in the updated fashions of the 1590s and adds verses at the bottom making explicit the contrast between Mary I's marriage and its accompanying war on the left, and Elizabeth's virginity accompanied by Peace and Plenty on the right.

Rogers engraved numerous portraits, title-pages, and illustrations for books, among these being the titles to Jan Huyghen van Linschoten's Discours of Voyages into ye Easte and West Indies, 1596, and to Sir John Harington's translation of Ariosto's Orlando Furioso (1591); the author portrait and title for John Gerard's The Herball, or a Generall Historie of Plantes (1597); the cuts in Broughton's Concert of Scripture (1596); and the portraits in William Segar's Honor, Military and Civile (1602) and Milles's Catalogue of Honour, or Treasury of True Nobility (1610).

Rogers' work shows him to have been a trained artist in the art of engraving. He is mentioned by Francis Meres in his Palladis Tamia (1598): "As Lysippus, Praxiteles, and Pyrgoteles were excellent engravers, so have we these engravers: Rogers, Christopher Switzer, and Cure."

== Gallery ==
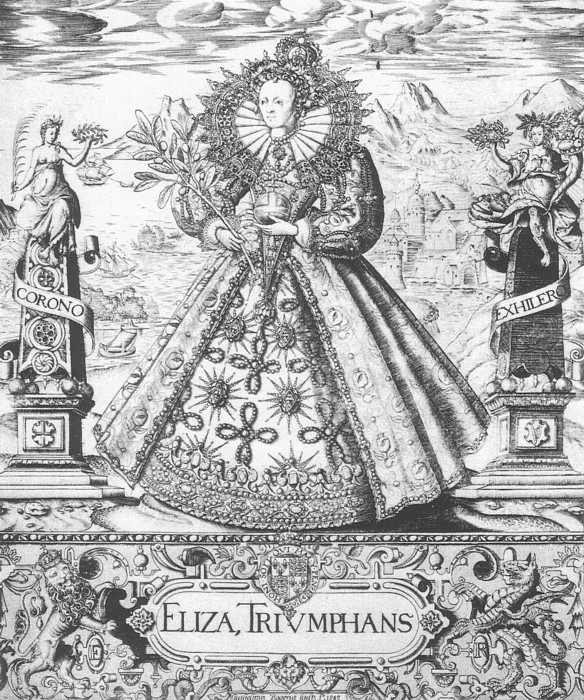
Eliza Triumphans (1589), British Library

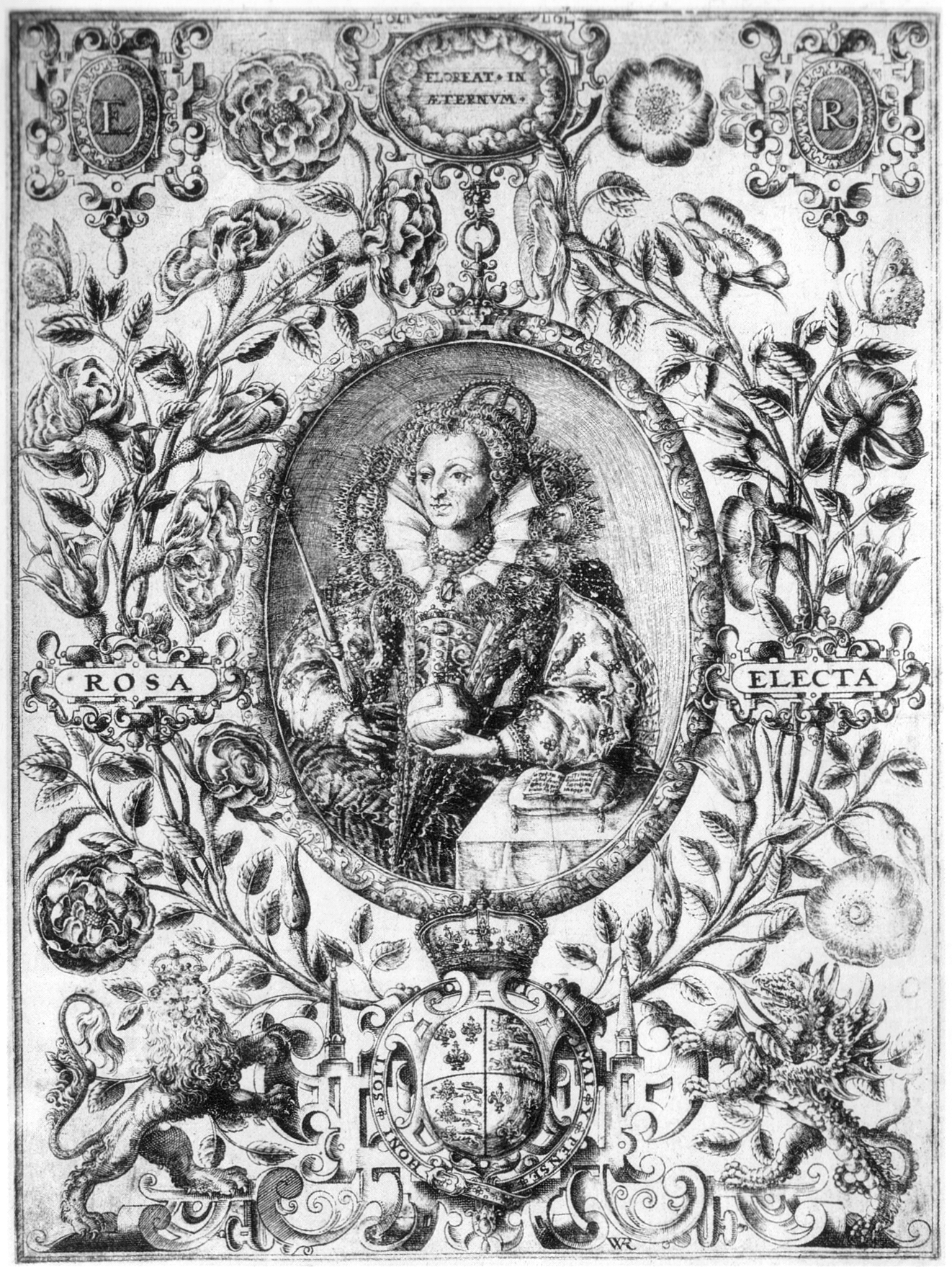
Elizabeth I as Rosa Electa, Bodleian Library

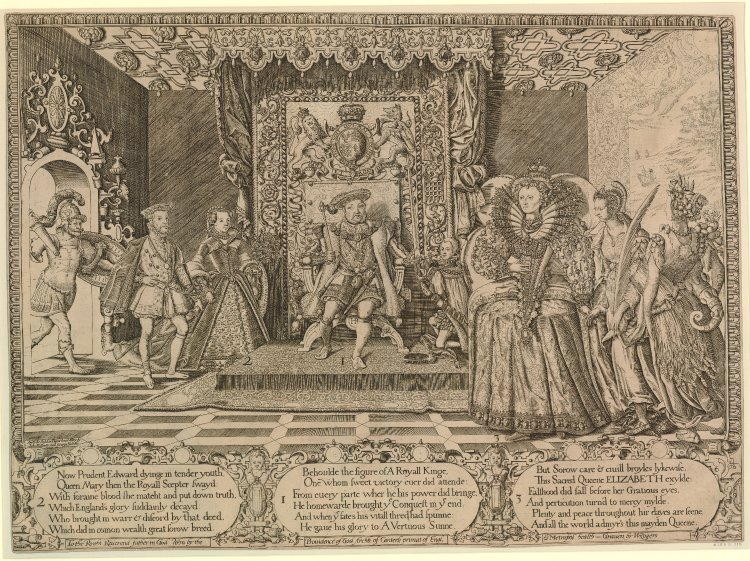
The Family of Henry VIII (c. 1597)

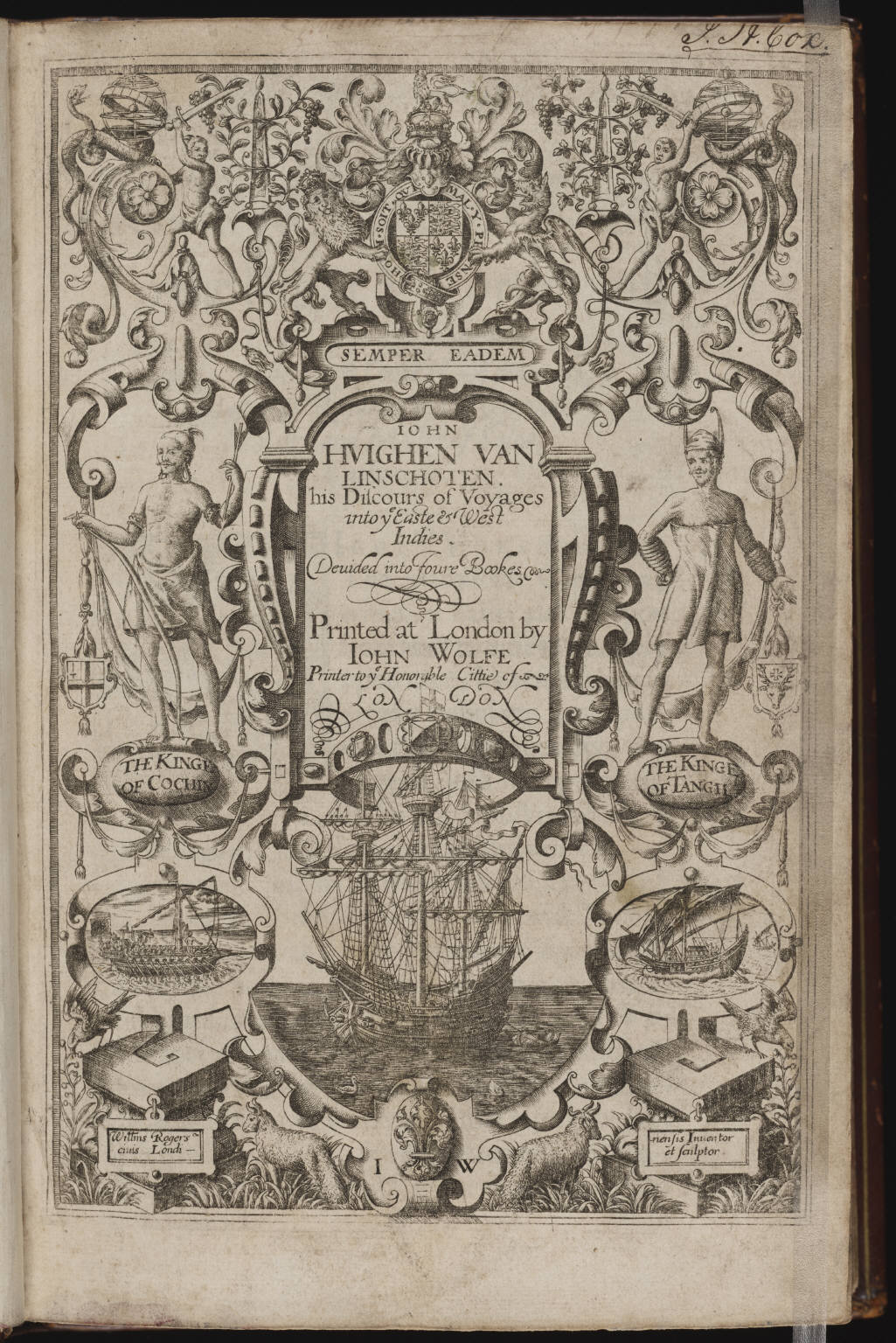
Iohn Huighen van Linschoten, his Discours of Voyages into ye Easte & West Indies, title page engraved by Rogers, (1598) Beinecke Rare Book and Manuscript Library

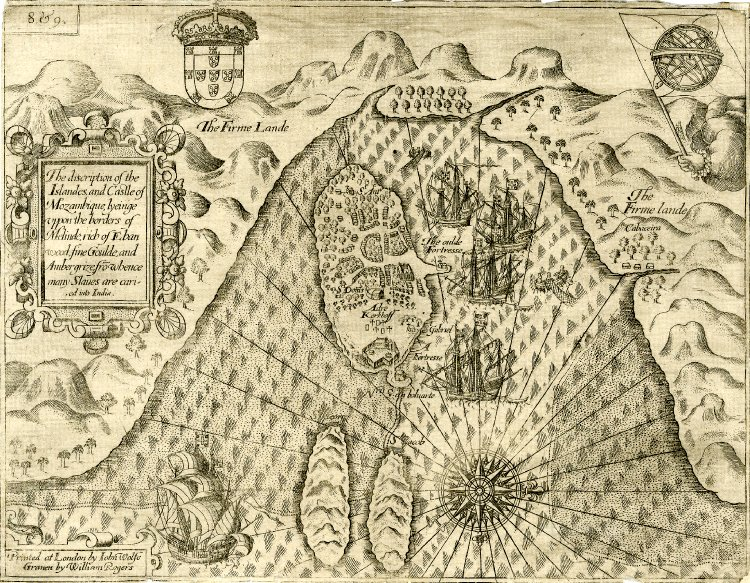
The discription of the Islandes and Castle of Mozambique (1598), British Museum

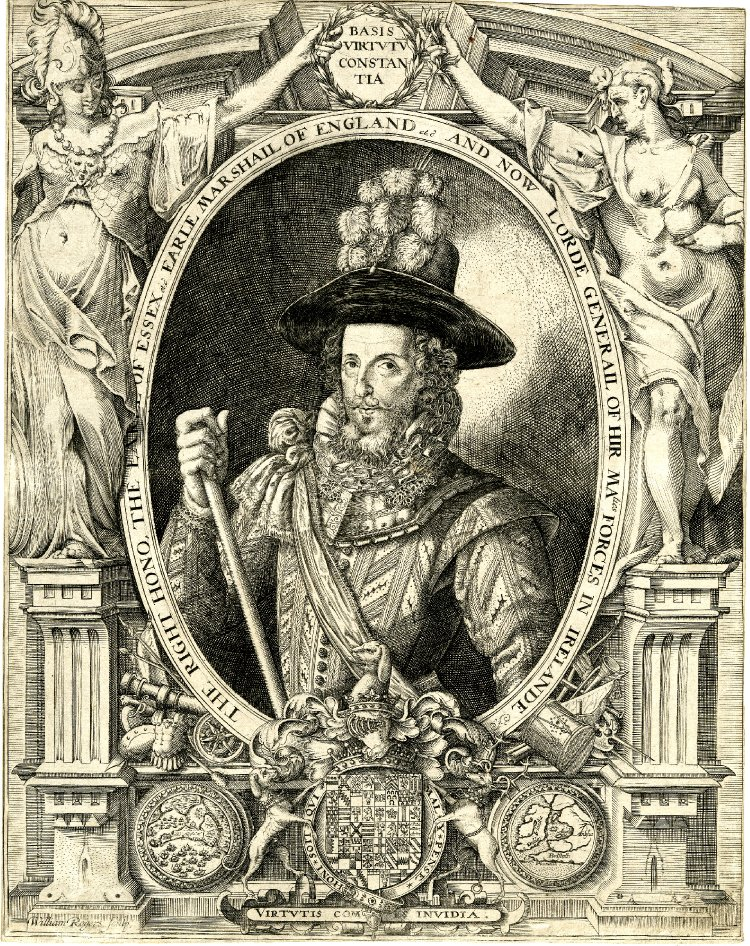
Robert Devereux, 2nd Earl of Essex (1598–1600), British Museum

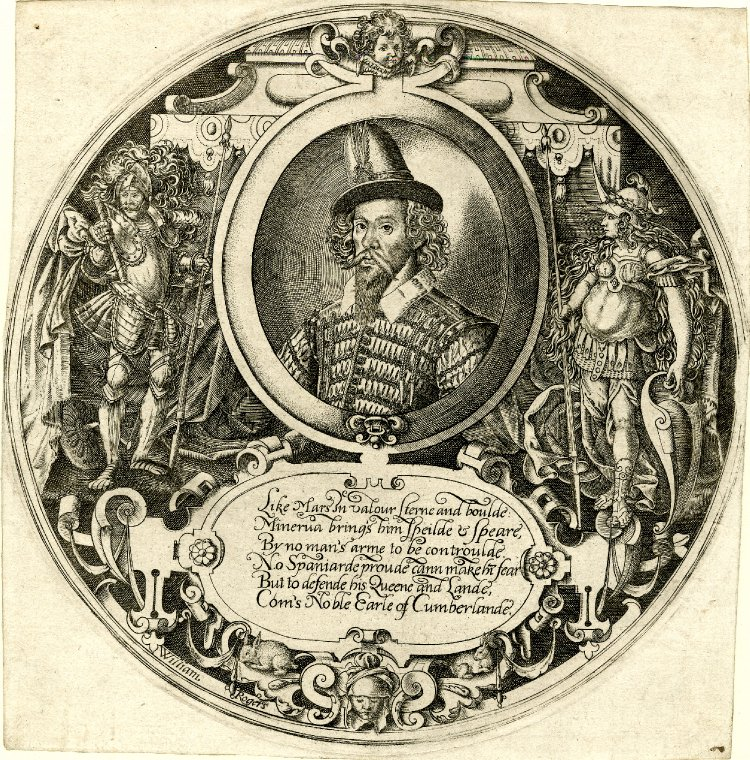
George Clifford, 3rd Earl of Cumberland (1595–1600), British Museum

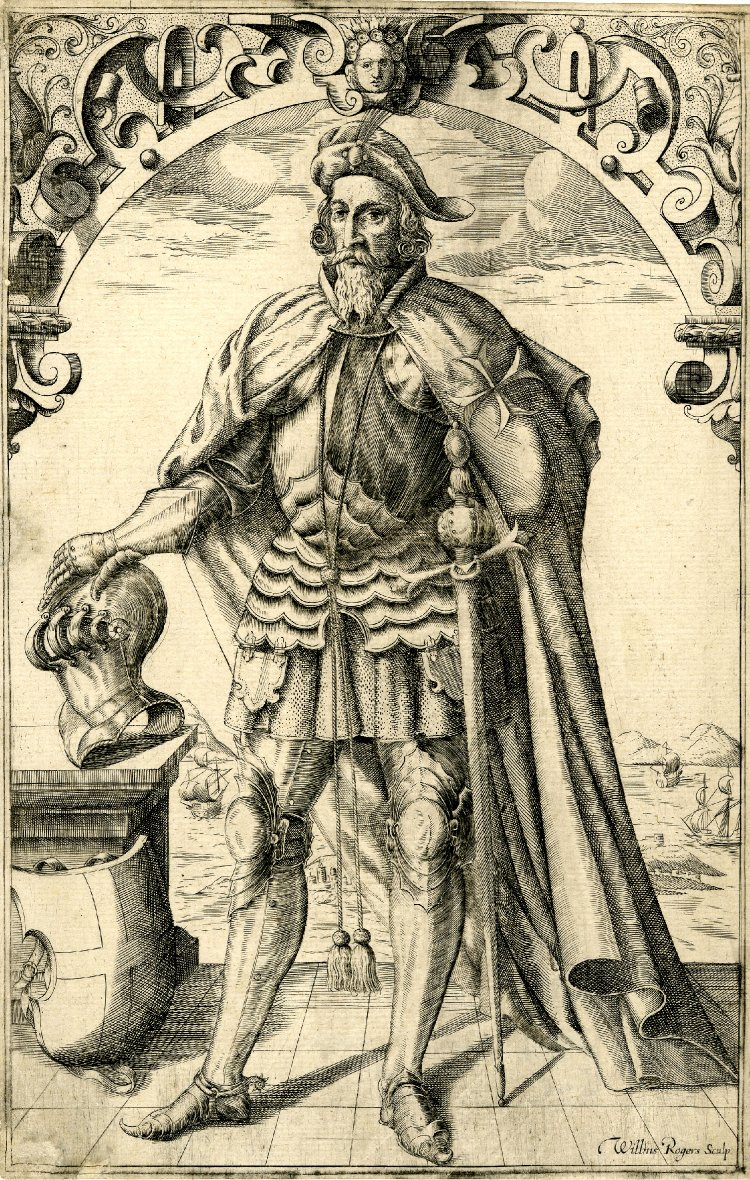
Thomas Docwra, Grand Prior of the English Knights Hospitallers, (1595-1602)

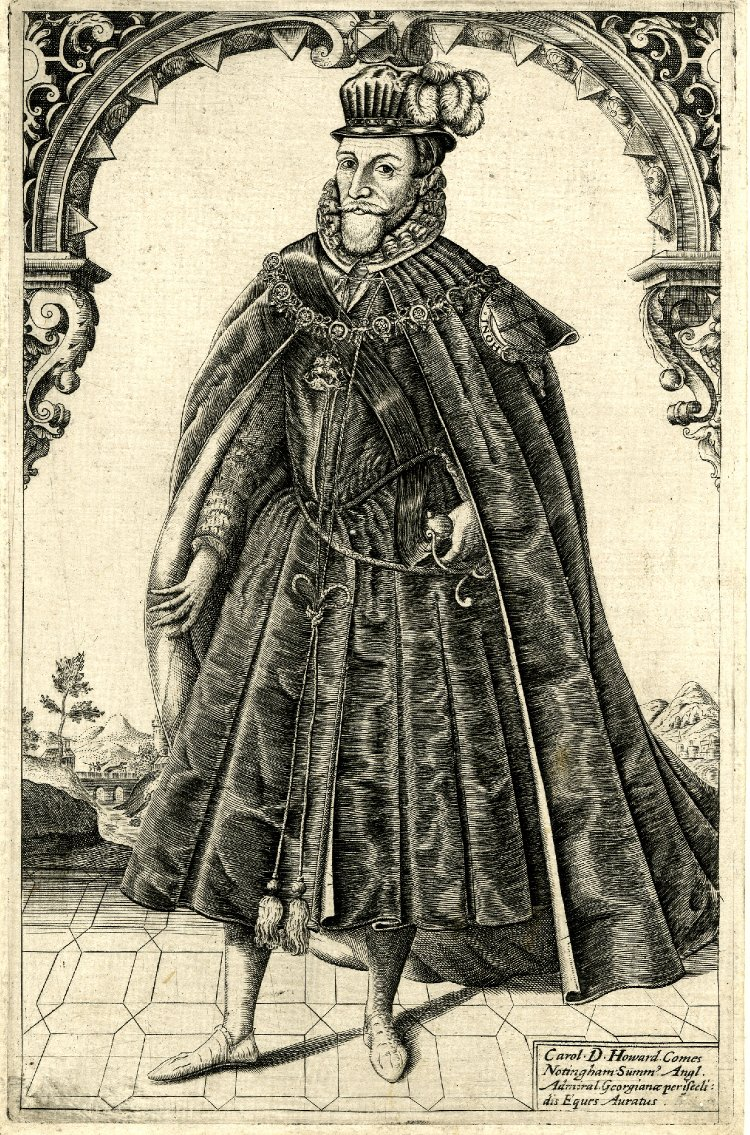
Charles Howard, 1st Earl of Nottingham, (1595-1602)

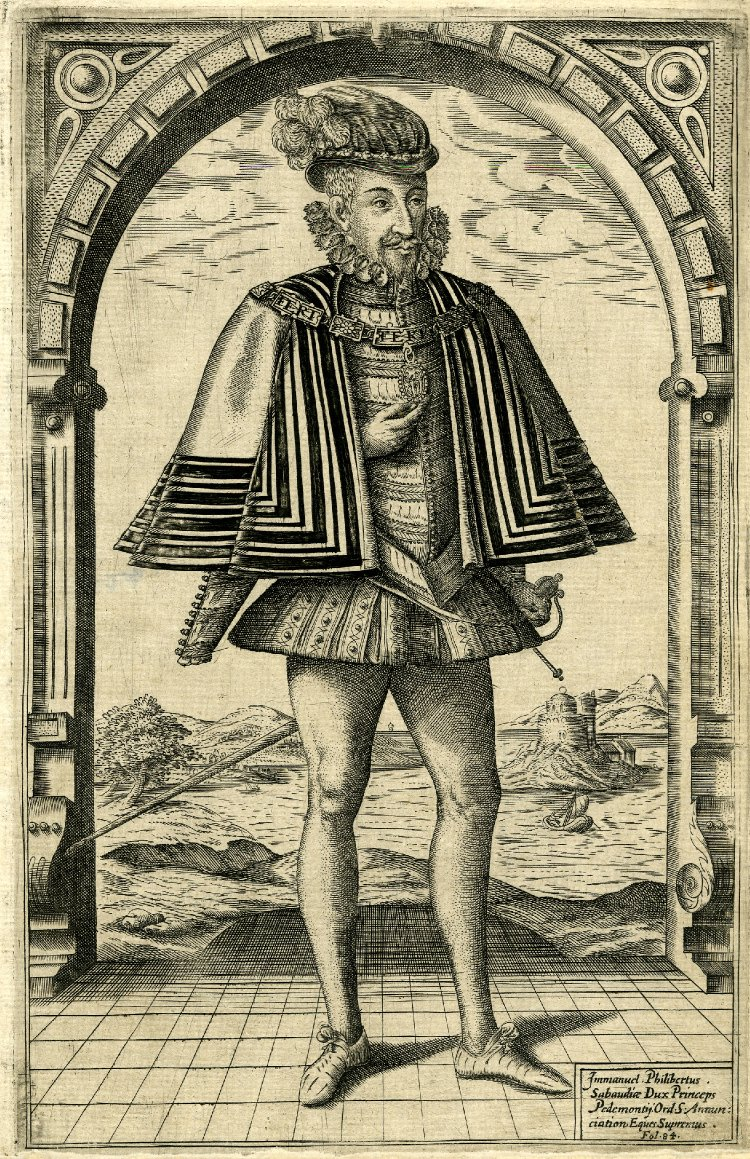
Emmanuel Philibert, Duke of Savoy, (1595-1602)

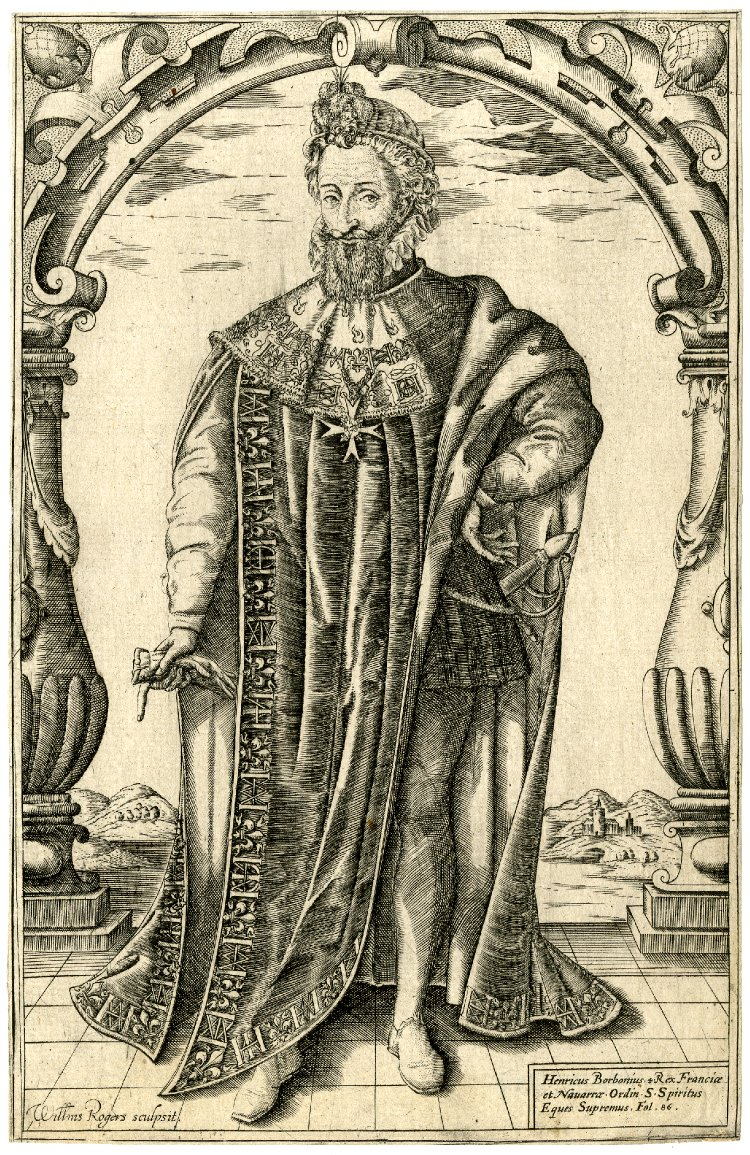
Henricus Borbonius 4 Rex Franciæ et Navarræ Ordin. S. Spiritus Eques Supremus (1602), British Museum

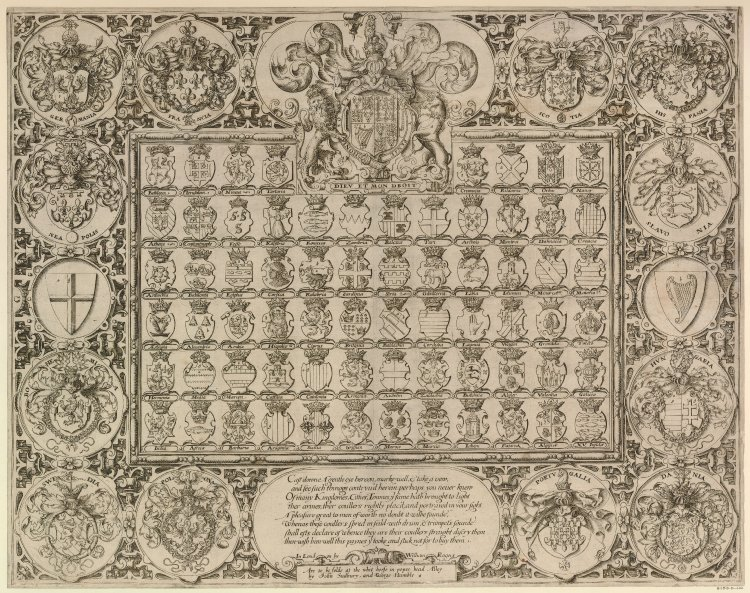
The coats of arms of sixty-eight kingdoms, cities and towns around the world (after 1603), British Museum
