= St John's Gate, Clerkenwell =

Historic building in London, England

Coordinates: 51°31′19.27″N 0°06′10.10″W

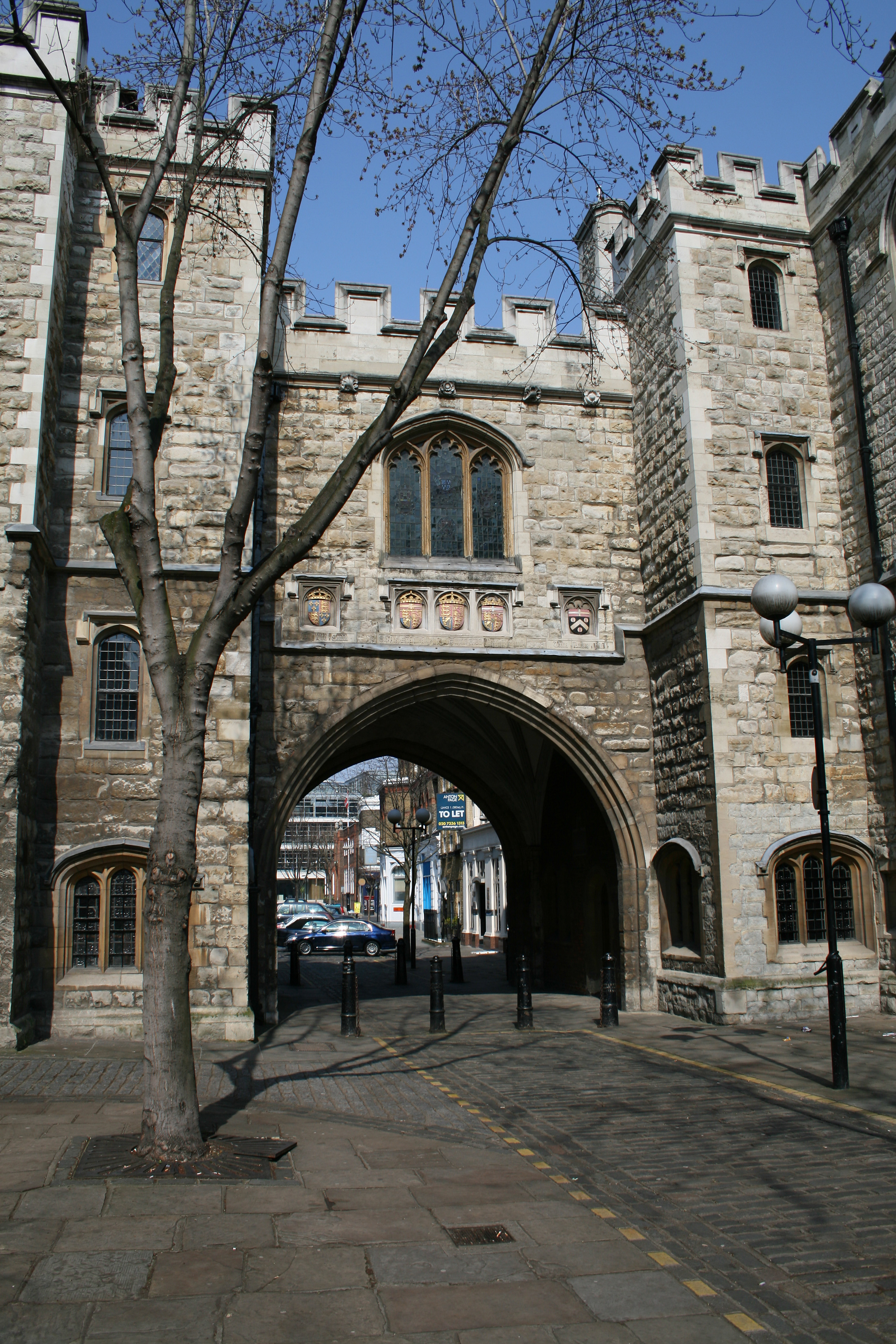
St John's Gate, Clerkenwell in 2007

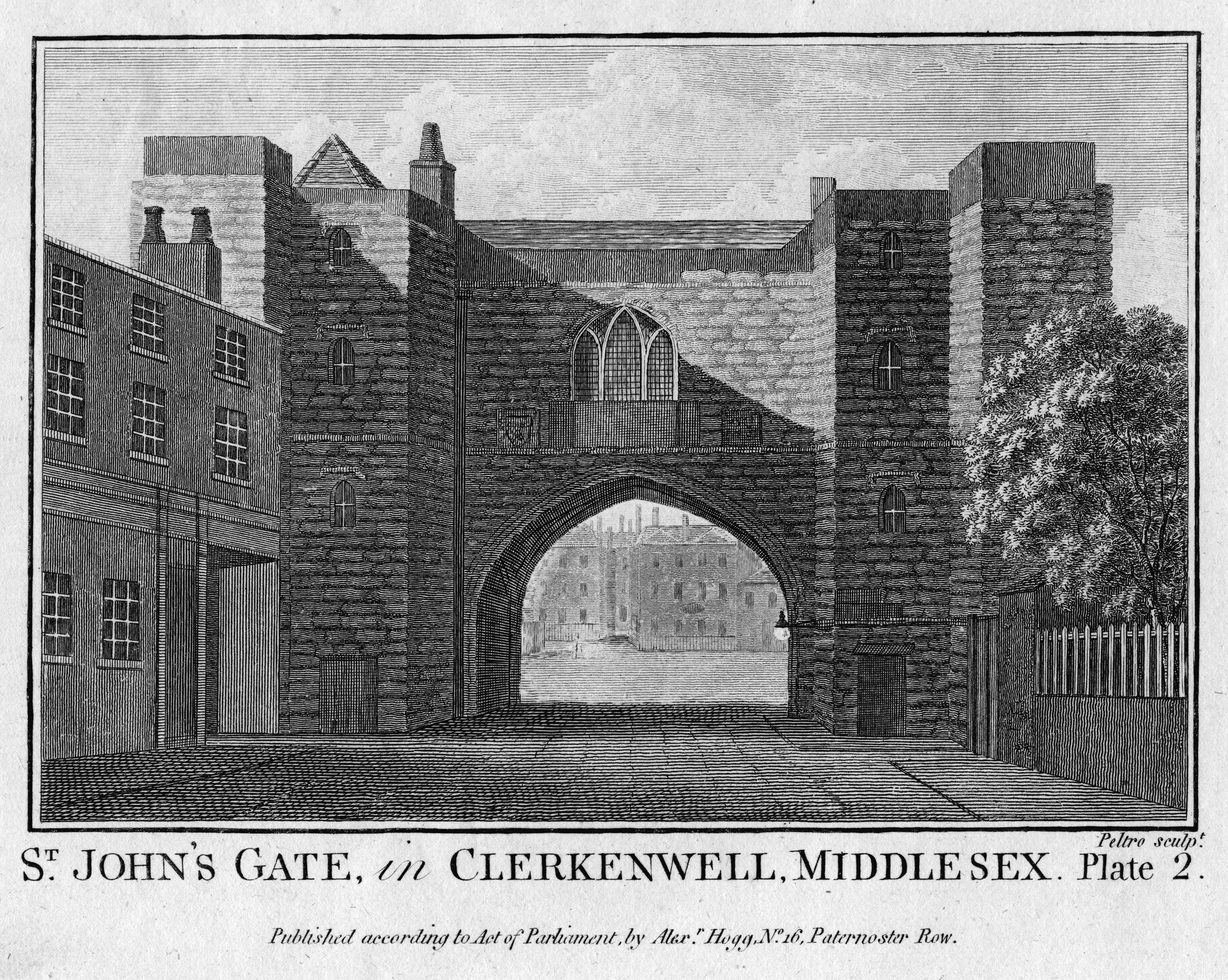
St John's Gate, Clerkenwell in 1786, before the Victorian restoration

St John's Gate, in Clerkenwell, Middlesex, now within central London, is one of the few tangible remains from Clerkenwell's monastic past. It was built in 1504 by Prior Thomas Docwra as the south entrance to the inner precinct of Clerkenwell Priory, the English headquarters of the Knights of the Order of St John (known as the Knights Hospitaller).

The substructure is of brick, while the north and south façades are of stone. After centuries of decay and much rebuilding, very little of the stone facing is original. Heavily restored in the 19th century, the Gate today is in large part a Victorian recreation, the handiwork of a succession of architects—William Pettit Griffith, R. Norman Shaw, and J. Oldrid Scott.

== History ==
The Priory was established in the 1140s in Clerkenwell as the English headquarters of the Order. The Order was dissolved by King Henry VIII as part of the Dissolution of the Monasteries when its lands and wealth were seized by the Crown. The Order was re-established for a brief period by that king's Roman Catholic daughter, Queen Mary, who granted it a Royal Charter. However, when her Protestant half-sister Queen Elizabeth I succeeded her, the Order in England was dissolved once again. The Order was re-established in England during the Victorian era.

== Uses ==
The building has many historical associations, most notably as the original printing-house for Edward Cave's pioneering monthly, The Gentleman's Magazine, and sometime workplace of Samuel Johnson. From 1701 to 1709 it was the childhood home of the painter William Hogarth, whose father Richard Hogarth in 1703 opened a coffee house there, known as "Hogarth's Coffee House", which offered Latin lessons together with coffee. For many years the building was used as a tavern. In 1831 John Frost established a medical hospital (St John's Hospital) in the building, the original mediaeval usage of that word signifying a guest-house.

The Gate was acquired in the 1870s by the revived Order of St John and was gradually converted to serve as headquarters of both the Order and its subsidiary, the St John Ambulance Brigade. It now also houses the Museum of the Order of St John. Much of its Tudor-style interior, including the Council Chamber over the arch, is attributed to Scott's Victorian restoration in the 1880s and 1890s.

St John's Gate was voted an iconic landmark to represent Islington for the London Olympics 2012.

== Stone plaque ==
A modern stone plaque is affixed to the building inscribed as follows:

St John's Gate. This building was the main entrance to the Grand Priory of the Order of the Hospital of St. John of Jerusalem. The original gatehouse was erected about the year 1148 & was burnt down by Wat Tyler in 1381. It was restored by Prior John Redington & was finally rebuilt in its present form by Prior Thomas Docwra in 1504. The Grand Priory buildings were appropriated by the crown in 1559. The order of the Hospital of St. John of Jerusalem resumed possession of this gatehouse in 1873.

== See also ==
- Museum of the Order of St John

== Gallery ==
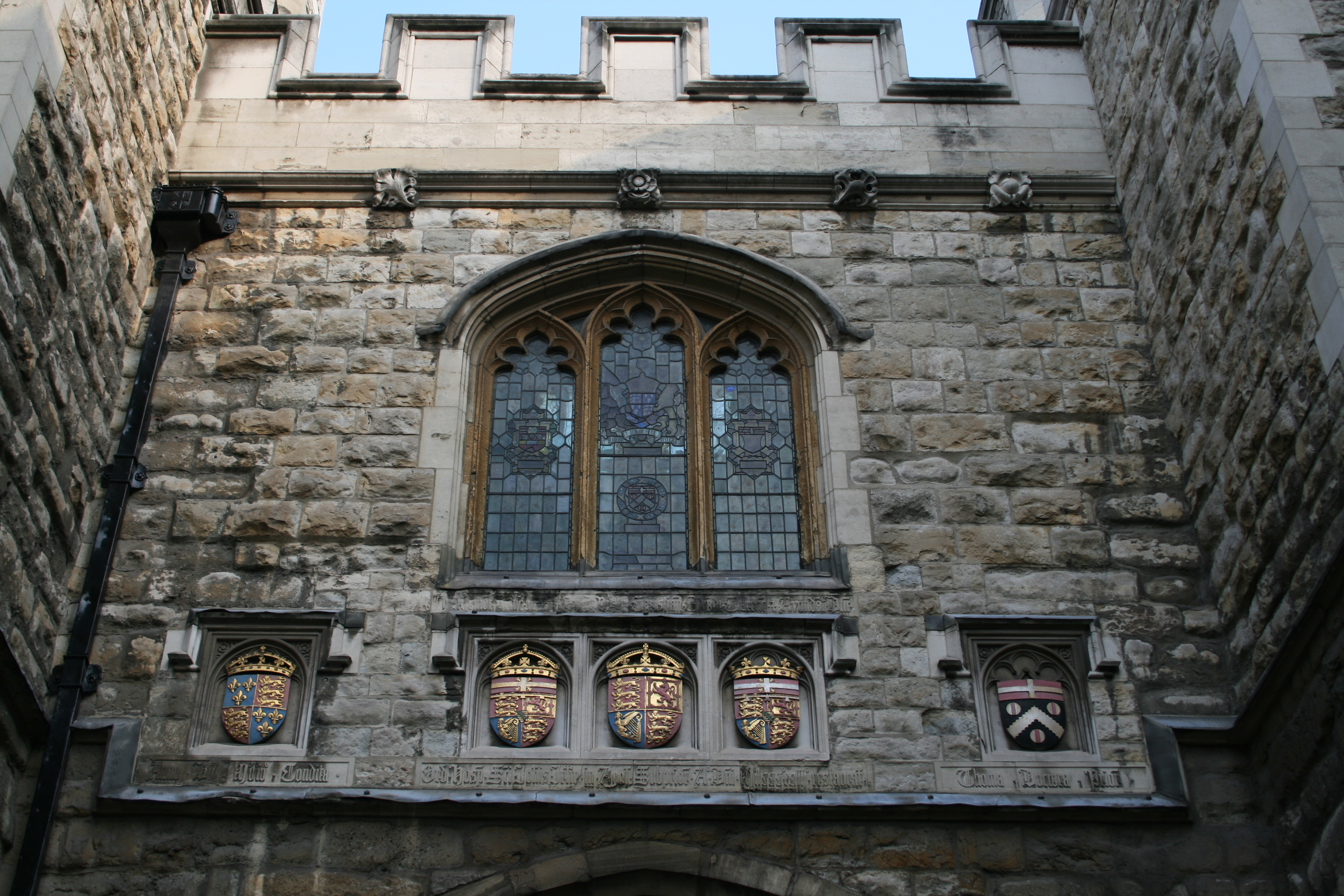
Detail of window and shields

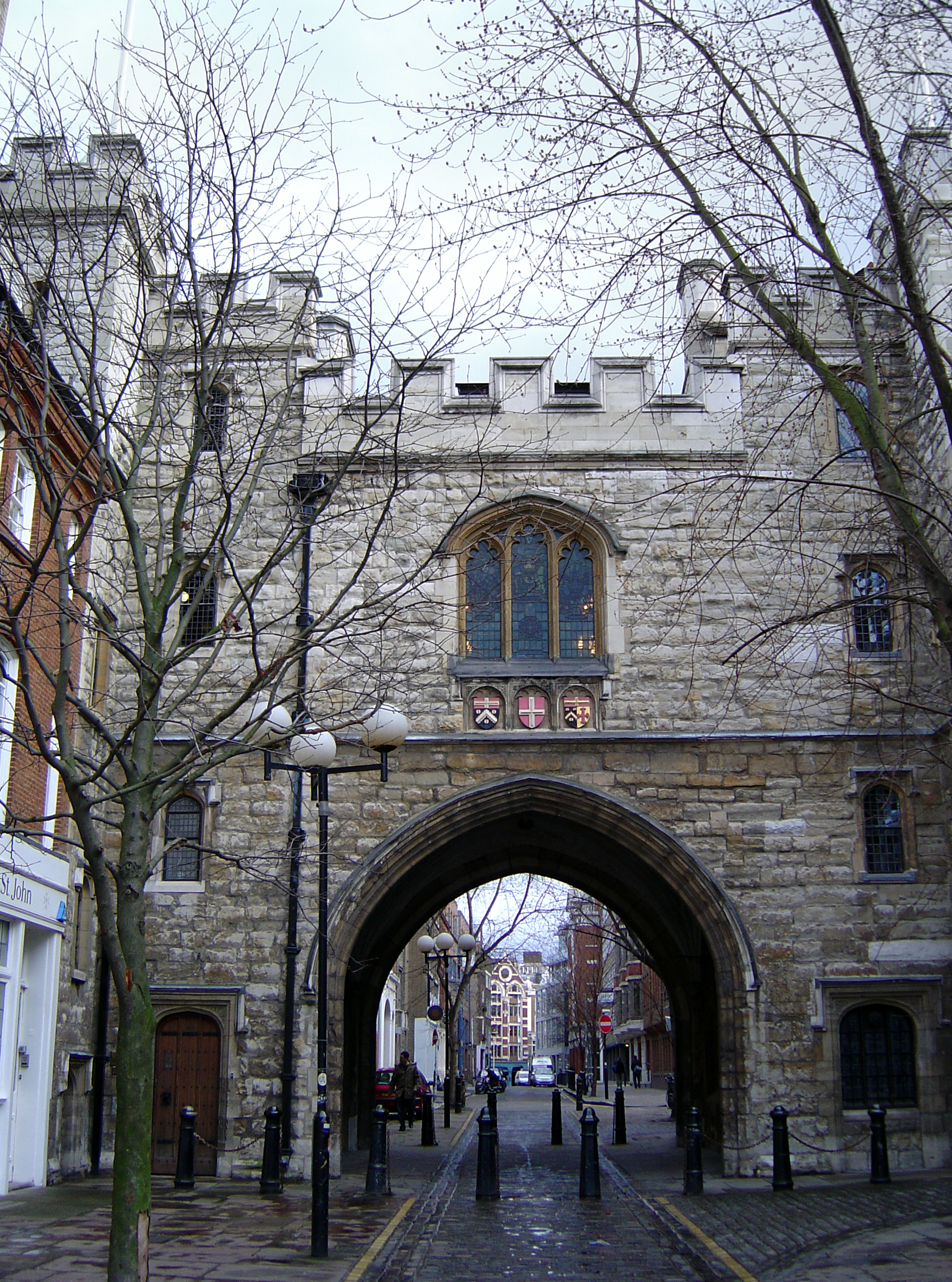
View from Clerkenwell Road

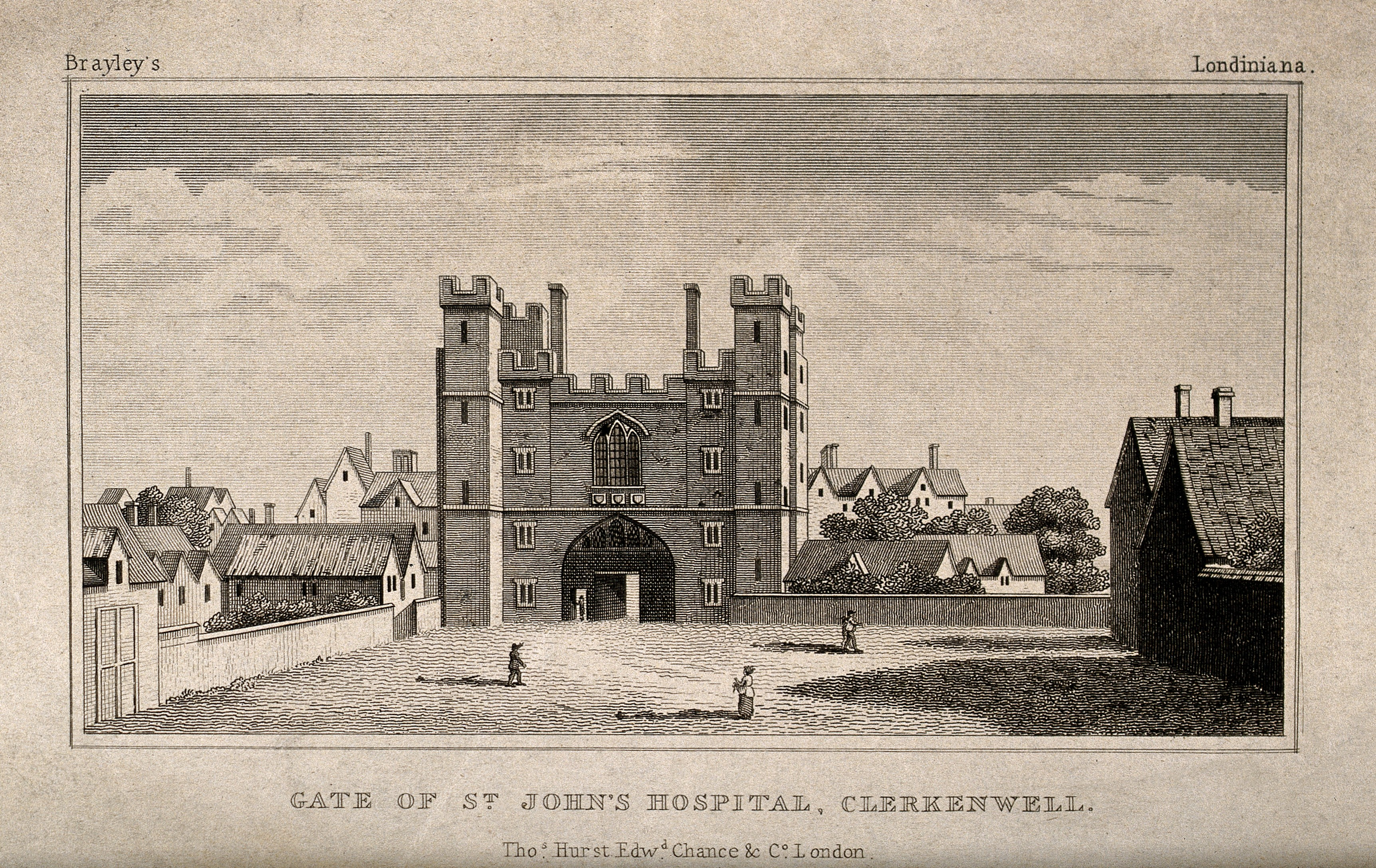
Gate of St John's Hospital by Wenceslaus Hollar, 1661

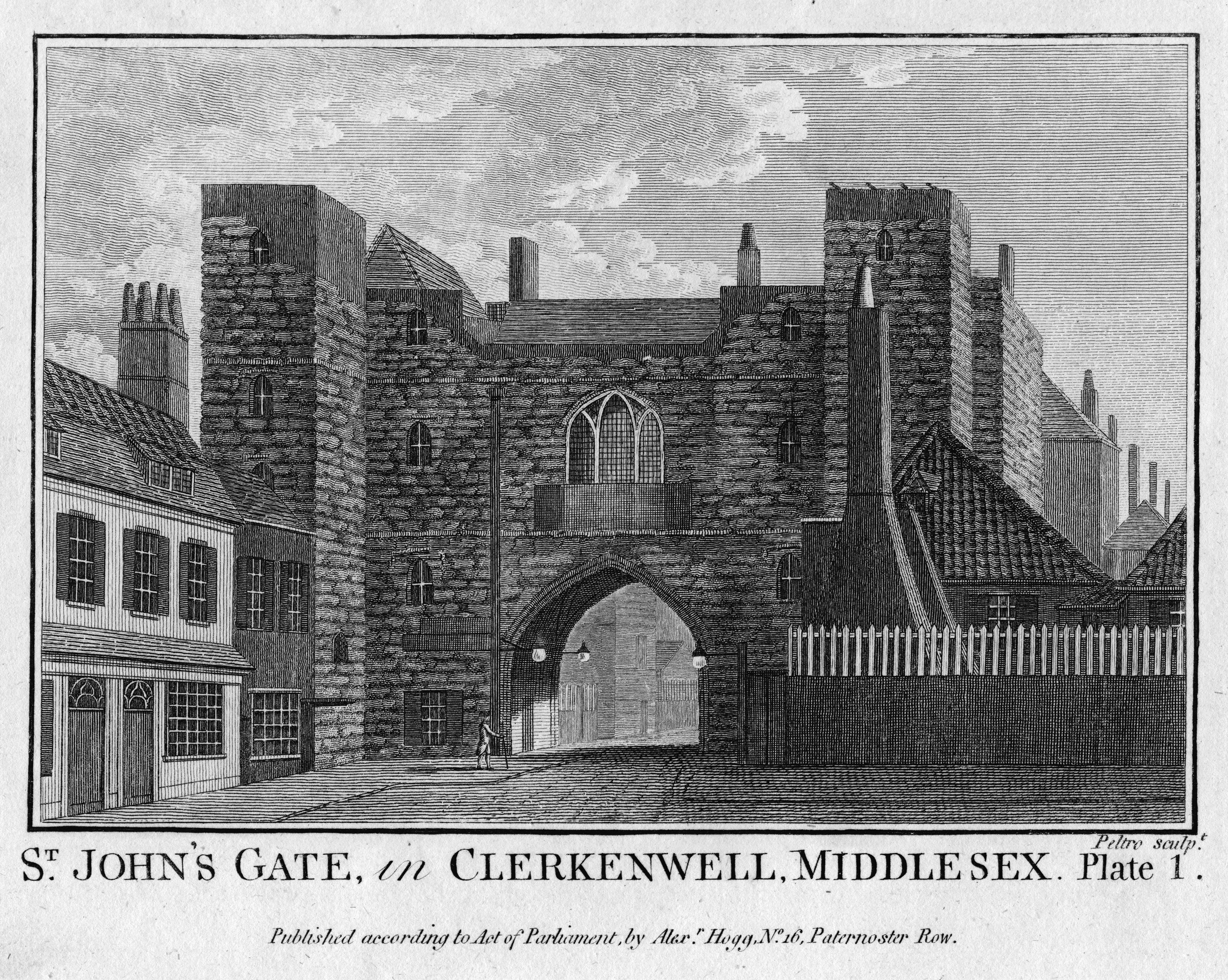
Copper engraved view from Boswell's Antiquities published in London by Alexander Hogg, 1786

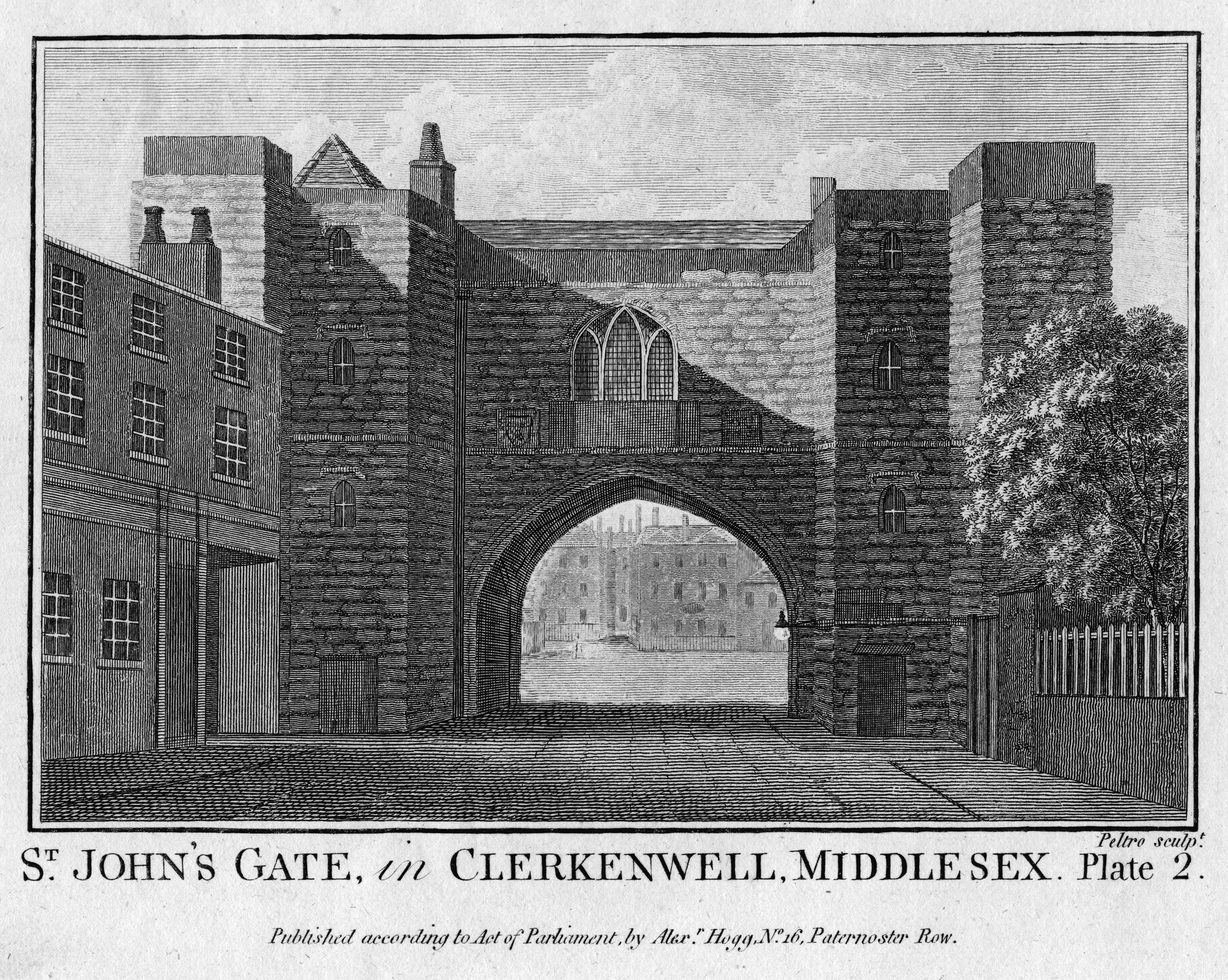
Copper engraved view from Boswell's Antiquities published in London by Alexander Hogg, 1786

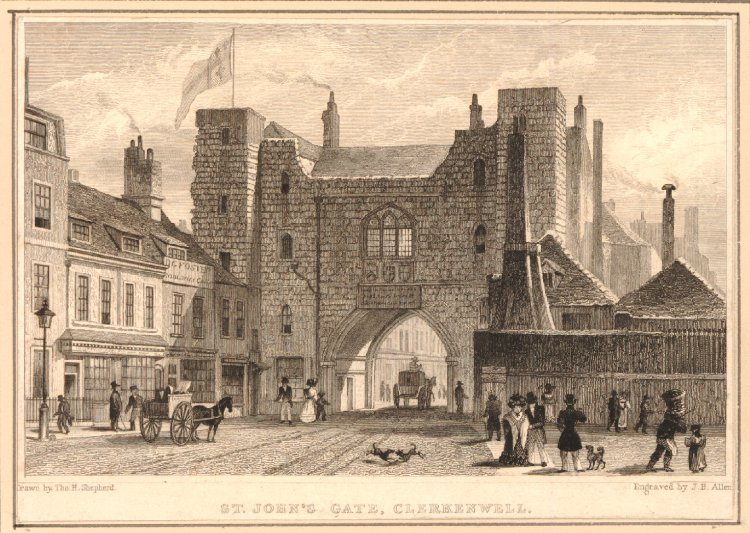
Steel engraving by Thomas Hosmer Shepherd, 1829–1831

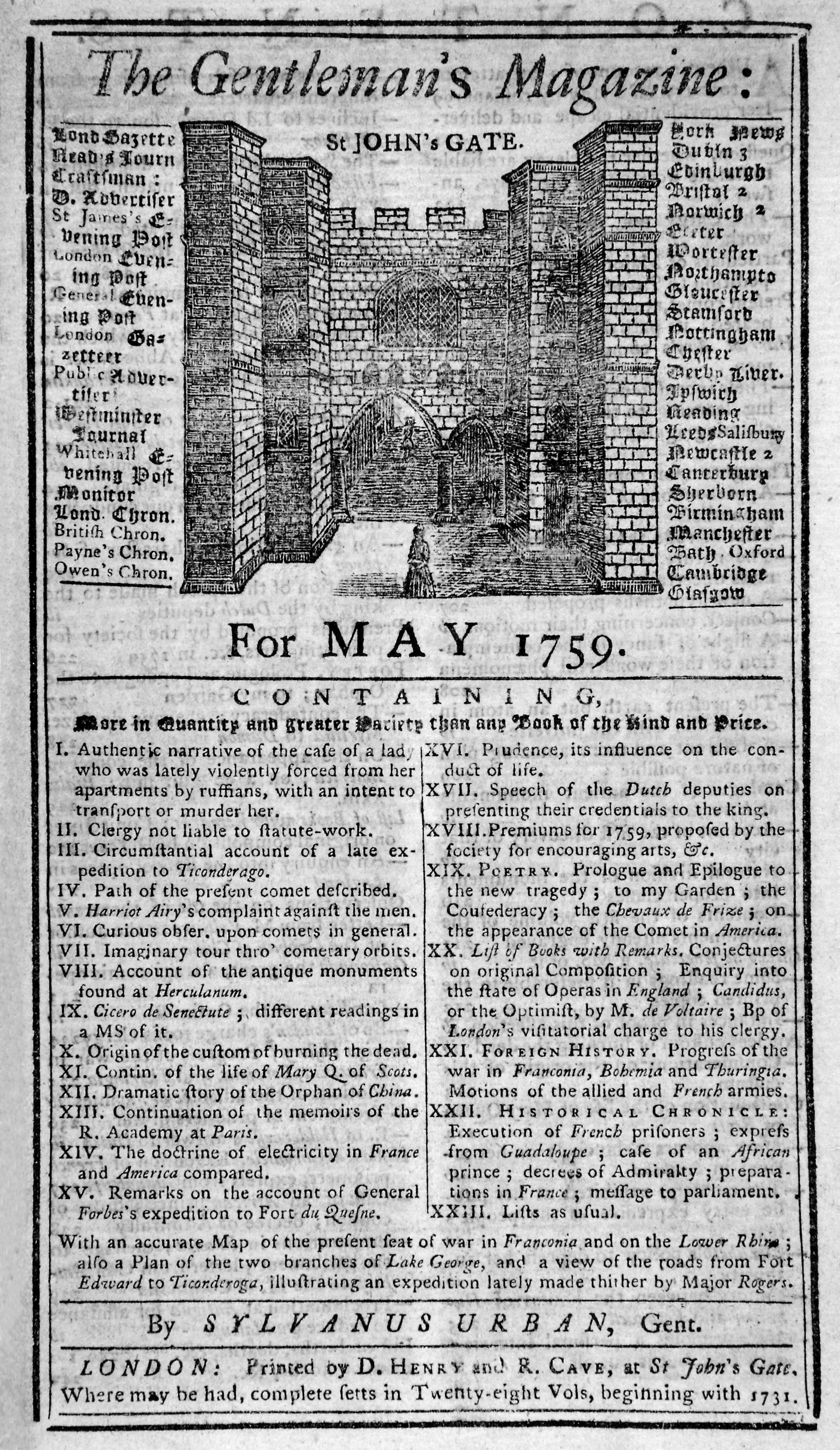
The Gentleman's Magazine, May 1759, with front page illustration of St John's Gate

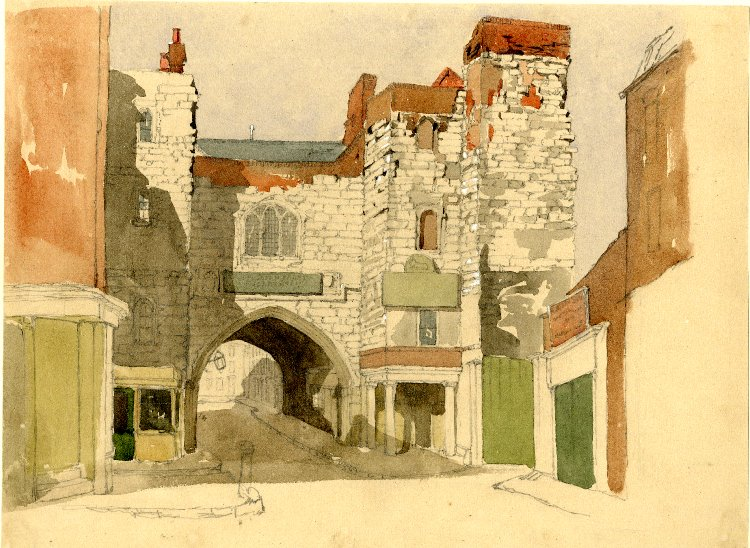
Watercolour by John Wykeham Archer, 1842

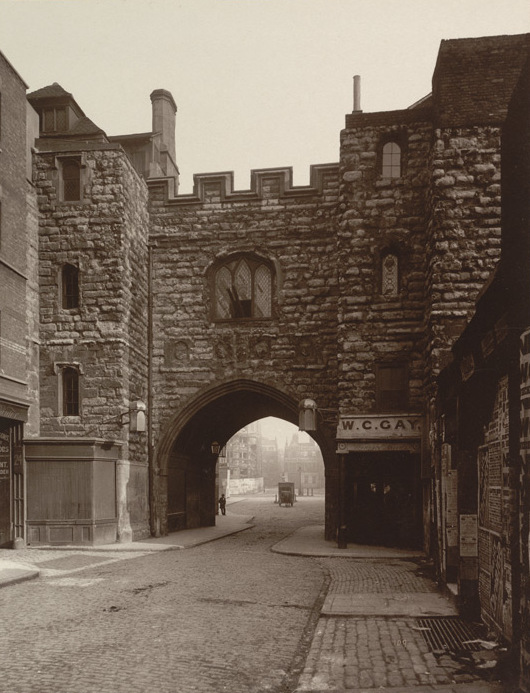
Photograph by Henry Dixon, 1880
