= Thomas Docwra =

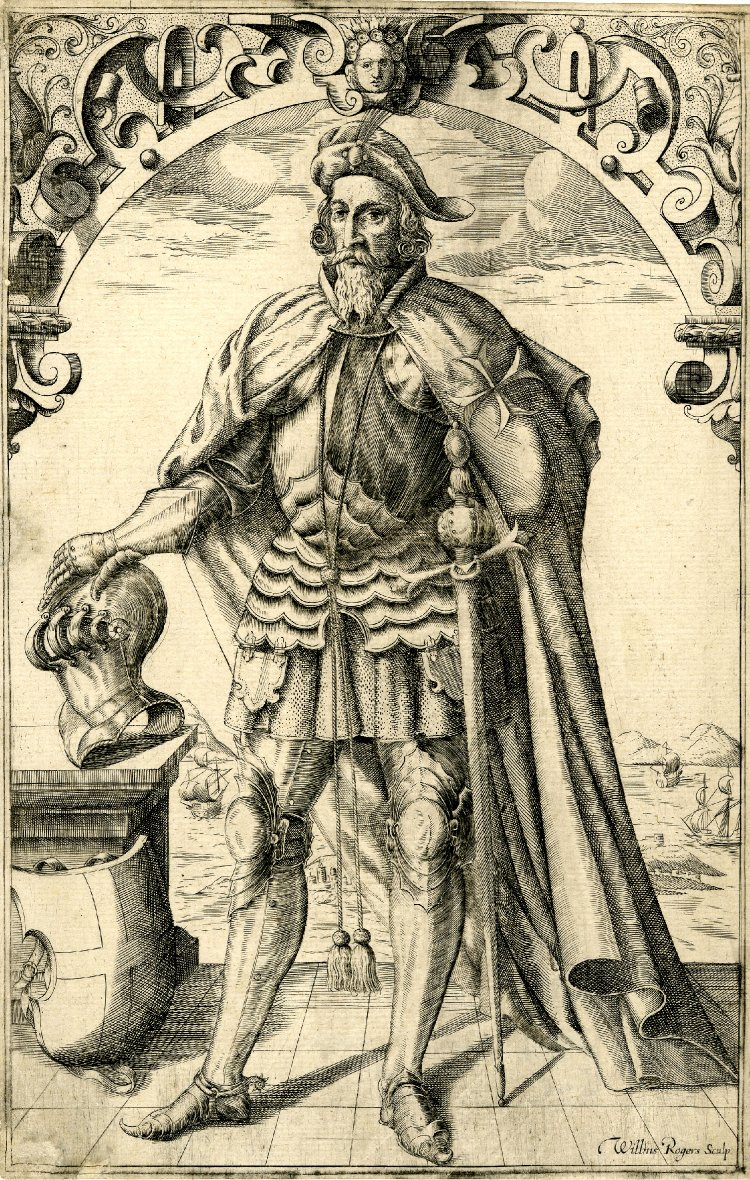
Thomas Docwra, dressed as a soldier in full armour, with shield displaying the Cross of the Order of St John and mantle displaying the Cross of Malta, with naval scene behind, under a strapwork arch. Engraving by William Rogers, c. 1595/1602

Arms of Sir Thomas Docwra: Sable, a chevron engrailed argent between three plates each charged with a pale gules (Docwra) with augmentation On a chief gules a cross argent (a chief of the Order of Saint John of Jerusalem)

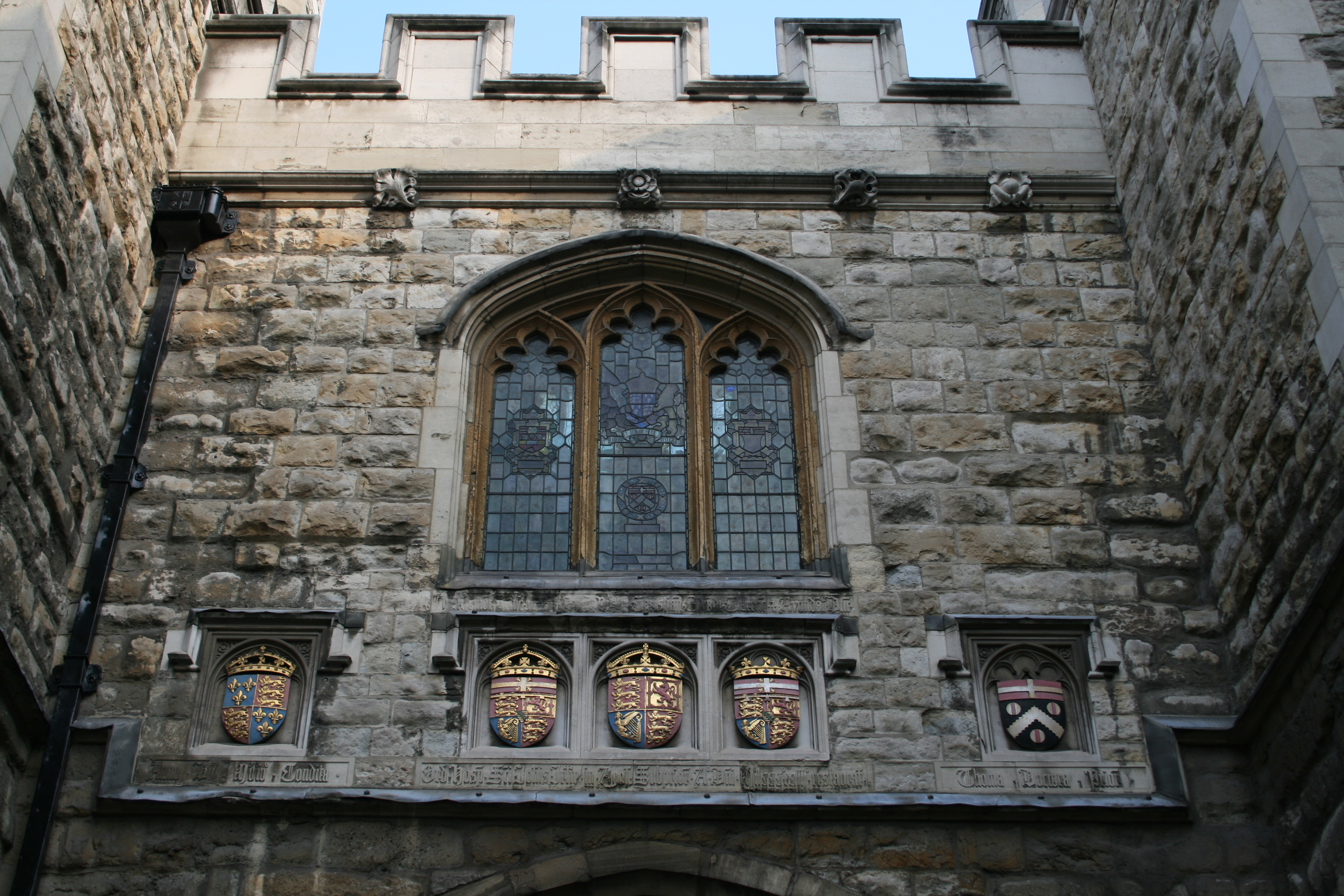
St John's Gate, Clerkenwell, south side, a surviving remnant of Clerkenwell Priory, English headquarters of the Order of Knights of the Hospital of Saint John of Jerusalem. The arms of Sir Thomas Docwra are at far right, as a Victorian restoration, also repeated on the north side

Sir Thomas Docwra (1458? – 1527) was Grand Prior of the Order of Knights of the Hospital of Saint John of Jerusalem in England, and thus ranked as Premier Lay Baron of England.

== Origins ==
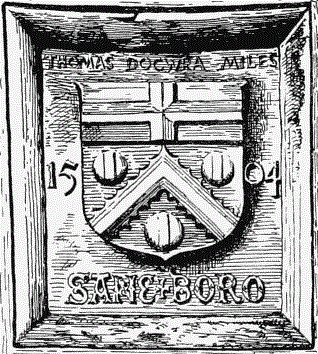
1504 datestone of Thomas Docwra, with his arms and a chief of the Order of St John. Highdown House, Pirton, Hertfordshire. Of uncertain provenance

He was a member of the Docwra family of Hertfordshire, a junior branch of the ancient Docwra family of Docwra Hall in Kendal, Westmorland. According to an old pedigree he was a son of Richard Docwra by his wife Alice Green, a daughter of Thomas Green of Gressingham in Lancashire. He may however have been a grandson of Richard and a son of Thomas Docwra. His ancestral home appears to have been Highdown House (or possibly Old Hall, an inn in 1912) in the parish of Pirton, Hertfordshire, where survives a datestone (of uncertain provenance) set into a wall of the east gable of the north courtyard (stables) range displaying the Docwra arms, inscribed "Thomas Docwra, Miles, 1504", the date he built St John's Gate, Clerkenwell. The Latin motto of the Order is inscribed below Sane Boro, interpreted by Cromwell (1828) as signifying "truly a baron" or "a baron indeed", a motto, signifying in two words so much, and that so pompously, is explained at once by the assumption of these Lords-Priors to be, not barons merely, but the very premiers of the Baronage of England.

== Career ==
He was admitted to the Knights Hospitaller at the age of 16, spending about four years as a novitiate. In 1480 he was on the Island of Rhodes with Sir Thomas Greene during the unsuccessful siege of the Island by the Turks. He later became Preceptor of the Order's holdings at Dinmore, Herefordshire. In 1494 he became Prior of Ireland and then a year later Turcopolier of the English tongue. By 1499 he became Captain of the Castle of St. Peter in Bodrum, Turkey. In 1501 he succeeded Sir John Kendal as Grand Prior in England, taking responsibility for all the Order's property in England. He reversed the policy of leasing property to secular tenants, most noticeably concerning Temple Balsall in Warwickshire where he terminated the lease of Sir Robert Throckmorton and attempted to claim arrears of rent. When Sir Lancelot Docwra arrived to repossess the property, Throckmorton had fortified the manor house and refused to allow the Order to enter.

Nevertheless, in 1519 Thomas leased Temple Dinsley in Hertfordshire to his nephew John Docwra. He leased land at Hampton, Middlesex to Thomas Wolsey, Archbishop of York, where that prelate built Hampton Court which Henry VIII of England converted to a royal palace when Wolsey fell from favour. Overall the Order had over 40 preceptories spread out from Cornwall to Northumberland, the majority of which retained their conventual status. Docwra would have visited them all once a year.

As the Lord of St John, Docwra was deemed the senior lay baron of England, with a prominent seat in the House of Lords. He was one of the peers who tried the Duke of Buckingham for treason in 1521. He was a member of the Privy Council and Admiral of the English Fleet, which may have been an honorary title.

As Grand Prior of St John he served on a number of commissions: he was involved with drainage in Lincolnshire, where the order had substantial landholdings and was appointed by the Masters of the Mint to a commission to investigate irregularities. He was also connected with the "search for suspicious characters in London" in 1520. He conducted marriage negotiations as well as financial and commercial matters on behalf of King Henry VII and his son Henry VIII. In 1510, the Grand Master of the Order in Rhodes requested that he come and help defend the Order against the Turks, but Henry VIII refused to allow him leave to depart the kingdom. In 1512 he was expected to turn up with 300 men-at-arms and a 200-ton ship when that king had a military adventure to pursue in France. In 1520 he accompanied the king at the Field of the Cloth of Gold near Calais.

== Death and succession ==
He died in May 1527 at the Order's headquarters at Clerkenwell Priory, where he was buried. His estate passed to his nephew, Thomas Docwra, who served as Sheriff of Hertfordshire. He was succeeded as Grand Prior by Sir William Weston, the last Grand Prior of the Knights Hospitaller in England before the Dissolution of the Monasteries.

== See also ==
- List of the priors of Saint John of Jerusalem in England
