= Premier baron =

In the United Kingdom the title of Premier Baron denotes a baron who takes precedence over all others of that degree. In England before the Reformation this distinction belonged ex officio to the Prior of the Order of St. John who ranked above all Lords Temporal of baronial degree, but since then it has been accorded to the holder of the oldest surviving barony not subsidiary to a higher title.

- The Baron de Ros is the Premier Baron of England and as the peers of England take precedence over all peers of Scotland, Great Britain, Ireland, and the United Kingdom, is the peer of that degree with the highest precedence in the entire UK. However, when this title is held by a woman, the holder of the next most senior surviving barony (Baron Mowbray) is accorded the style of Premier Baron.
- The Baron Kingsale is the Premier Baron of Ireland.
- In Scotland the title of Baron is a non-peerage title of nobility in the Baronage of Scotland ranking below the peerage. The Premier Baron of Scotland is the Baron of the Bachuil holding what is considered the oldest aristocratic title in Great Britain, while the peers analogous to Barons of England and Ireland are Lords of Parliament; the Premier Lord of Parliament of Scotland is Lord Forbes.
