= List of the priors of Saint John of Jerusalem in England =

The following is a list of the Lord Priors of Saint John of Jerusalem in England, the Knights Hospitallers, until the Order was stripped of its properties and income by Henry VIII, during the brief restoration of the Grand Priory under Queen Mary I, and from the restoration of the Grand Priory of England in 1993. For Lord Priors and Grand Priors of the Venerable Order of St John of Jerusalem see the Most Venerable Order of St John of Jerusalem.

== Since foundation ==
1. Gabnabius, (or Gabnebius) of Naples the first prior (died 31 August 1192). He was prior in the time of Richard de Balmeis II, Bishop of London (who died 1162), and also when Richard FitzNeal held the same see, from 1189 to 1198. Died the last day of August. At the time there was a sister house at Buckland, Somerset (during the reign of Henry II), which had a prioress for 60 years.
2. Richard De Turk. Died 12 August.
3. Rodolphus De Dyna. Died 13 May.
4. Alanus, prior, was raised to the Bishopric of Bangor 16 April 1195. Died 19 March 1196.
5. Gilbert De Vere prior 1195. Died 13 August.
6. Robert fitz Richard. 1197
7. Hugh Dawnay (or De Alneto). Died 23 November.
8. Robert Theasarius. Died 26 October.
9. Terricus De Nussa (or Mussa), prior 1237 – 1238. Died 21 December.
10. Theodoric, prior in 1247.
11. Robert De Manneby, prior 1251 – 1262. Died 14 October.
12. Roger De Vere, prior 1269, gave the church of Clerkenwell one of the six pots used when Jesus turned water into wine. Died 15 February 1270.
13. Joseph of Chauncy prior 1274 – 1280. In the last year he gave the Vicar of Standon lands in the same parish. Died 11 March.
14. William De Henley prior 10 February 1280 –1288. He was responsible for building the cloister of Clerkenwell in 1284. Died 4 February.
15. Peter De Hakham (or Hagham), prior 1291 – 1293. Died 11 January.
16. William De Tothall prior 1297. Died 12 October 1318.
17. Richard De Paveley prior 1318 – 1321. Died 3 August.
18. Robert De Dyna, prior, died 24 November.
19. Thomas L'Archer was prior in 1323. Died 28 August 1329.
20. Leonard De Tybertis was prior from August 1329 – 31 January 1335.
21. Philip De Thame prior 1335 – 1353.
22. John Paveley prior 1355/8 – 1371. Lieutenant Prior and Turcopolier, named Grand Prior of England in a bull of Roger de Pins, Grand Master, dated Rhodes, 14 October 1358. He served as Admiral of an English fleet in 1360. Died 1371. Arms of John Paveley: Azure, a cross patoncée or. See also the Paveley Rudder, a heraldic badge used by the Paveley family.
23. Robert Hales prior 1372. On 1 February 1380 he was appointed Treasurer of the Exchequer by King Richard II and was beheaded on Tower Hill by the insurgents under Wat Tyler, 1381.
24. John de Radington prior 1382 and 1406. (Note: Patent Rolls 12 Richard II Part I Membrane 23 describes a meeting of the King's Council at Oxford on 2 July 1388. The list of Council members includes "Ralph de Basset, prior of the Hospital of St. John of Jerusalem in England". This suggests that the dates given for John De Radington may be incorrect.)
25. Walter Grendon prior 1399 (approx), 1408, 1409 and 1416.
26. William Hulles prior 1407, 1422, 1427, 1429 and 1431.
27. Robert Malory (or Mallore), prior 1432, 1435 and 1437.
28. Robert Botyl, prior 1439 - 16 January 1469.
29. John Langstrother, prior, 9 March 1469.
30. William Tournay, prior, 1471 and 1474.
31. Robert Molton prior 1474 – 1476.
32. John Weston prior 1477 – 1479, 1483 and 1485. (Note: John Weston was the 30th prior according to Nelson 1811, p. 60; but the 31st according to Clarke 1899, p. 377)
33. John Kendal prior 1491, 1495 and 1500 – 18 November 1501.
34. Thomas Docwra prior 1 May 1502, 1517, 1519.
35. William Weston, the last prior before the dissolution, died 7 May 1540, the same year the priory was dissolved by Henry VIII (see the dissolution of the monasteries).

== Following the first restoration ==
- Thomas Tresham I, prior 1557-1559 (the first restoration of the Grand Priory of England under Queen Mary I).
- Richard Shelley was the last grand prior of the knights of St. John in England. He did not take up the title in deference to the wishes of Queen Elizabeth I.

Titular English priors, in most cases Italians by birth, continued to be appointed until 1798:

- Oliver Starkey, Grand Prior 1578-1588.

...

- Andrew Wyse, Grand Prior 1593-1631.

...

- Henry FitzJames, Grand Prior 1689-1701.

...

- Girolamo Laparelli, Grand Prior († 1815)

== Following the second restoration Sovereign Order of Malta ==
In 1970 a Sub-Priory of the Blessed Adrian Fortescue (he was a knight of the Order at time of King Henry VIII) was founded and renamed in 1993 as Grand Priory of England.

- 55 Frà Matthew Festing, Grand Prior 1993-2008 (Note: From the second restoration of the Grand Priory of England until Matthew Festing was elected Grand Master of the Order (Order of Malta 2011).)
- 56 Frà Fredrik Crichton-Stuart, Grand Prior 2008-2011.
- 57 Fra’ Ian Scott of Ardross, Grand Prior from 2011 to 2019.
- 58 Fra’ Maxwell William Rumney, Procurator from 2019 to 2022 and Grand Prior since 8 September 2022 to current.

== Unknown ==
The priorship dates of the following are not known, but probably served during the reign of Edward I (1239 -1307).

- Simon Botard, died 3 May.
- Elias Smetherton, 27 April.
- Stephen Fulhorn, 1 January.
- Walter — died 27 August.
