= Arn – The Kingdom at Road's End =

2008 Swedish epic film

- Theatrical poster
- Directed by: Peter Flinth
- Written by: Jan Guillou (novels); Hans Gunnarsson (screenplay)
- Produced by: Waldemar Bergendahl
- Starring: Joakim Nätterqvist; Sofia Helin; Stellan Skarsgård; Milind Soman
- Narrated by: Sven-Bertil Taube
- Music by: Tuomas Kantelinen
- Distributed by: AB Svensk Filmindustri
- Release date: 22 August 2008 (Sweden)
- Countries: Sweden; Finland; Norway; United Kingdom; Denmark; Germany
- Languages: Swedish; Norwegian; English; Danish; Arabic
- Budget: SEK210,000,000 (ca. US$30,000,000) (total budget of both films)

Arn – The Kingdom at Road's End (Swedish: Arn – Riket vid vägens slut) is an epic film based on Jan Guillou's trilogy about the fictional Swedish Knight Templar Arn Magnusson. It was released to cinemas in Sweden on 22 August 2008 and is the sequel to the 2007 film Arn – The Knight Templar, but both films were combined into a single cut for the English release on DVD in 2010.

Filmed in Scotland, Sweden, Damascus, Syria and Morocco.

== Plot ==
The plot of the film loosely follows the book of the same name – the third volume of the Crusades trilogy, spanning the period of about 1187 to 1210.

Arn is the commander of a Templar garrison in Gaza. He is commanded to join a Templar force intercepting the army of Saladin. Due to the arrogance of the new Templar Grandmaster Gerard de Ridefort, the Crusaders are destroyed in the ensuing Battle of Hattin. Arn is wounded but Saladin recognizes him and saves Arn from execution. Arn wakes in Damascus, his wounds treated; Saladin sends him home with his friendship as he prepares to take Jerusalem.

Cecilia is finally allowed to leave the monastery where she has done penance for twenty years, meeting her son Magnus for the first time. She soon hears of the fall of Jerusalem and the destruction of the Templars and believing Arn dead decides to become a nun for the rest of her life, being offered the post of Abbess by the Folkung clan. Arn meets her as she is just about to enter the convent, and they marry at last, building an estate, Forsvik, where Arn has gathered craftsmen from all over Europe and the Holy Land. Arn is introduced to his son Magnus, born in his absence; after a little time a daughter named Alde is born, and Forsvik grows rapidly. Arn takes young men and boys to become knights-in-training.

Six years later King Knut Eriksson dies, leaving children as heirs. King Sverker II retakes the crown with Danish help and attempts to murder the sons of Knut, prevented by the intercession of a Folkung who has tricked Sverker into thinking he was a double agent. Forced to go to war once again, Arn leads the Folkung against the Sverker-Danish force at the Battle of Lena, aided by Arabic craftsmen and the Norwegian Templar, Harald Øysteinsson. Arn destroys the Danish cavalry tricking them to charge into a rain of arrows. Arn charges forward on horseback to attack King Sverker, and is intercepted by Ebbe Sunesson, the leader of the Danes; in the ensuing duel Arn kills him, taking a fatal wound in the exchange. The Folkung emerge victorious, but Arn dies of his wound upon his return to Forsvik. The film concludes with an epilogue foreshadowing the completion of the consolidation of Sweden into a unified kingdom a generation later through Birger Jarl, identified as Arn's grandson.

== Cast ==
- Joakim Nätterqvist as Arn Magnusson
- Sofia Helin as Cecilia Algotsdotter
- Anders Baasmo Christiansen as Harald Øysteinsson, a Norwegian Templar and Arn's trusted friend
- Morgan Alling as Eskil Magnusson, brother of Arn
- Stellan Skarsgård as Birger Brosa, uncle of Arn
- Joel Kinnaman as King Sverker Karlsson
- Gustaf Skarsgård as King Knut Eriksson, Arn's best friend
- Bill Skarsgård as Erik Knutsson, son of Knut
- Milind Soman as Saladin
- Nicholas Boulton as Gerard de Ridefort, Grandmaster of Templars
- Nijas Ørnbak-Fjeldmose as Sune Folkesson
- Martin Wallström as Magnus Månsköld, son of Arn
- Jakob Cedergren as Ebbe Sunesson
- Driss Roukhe as Fakhr
- Fanny Risberg as Queen Cecilia Blanka, wife of Knut
- Zakaria Atifi as Ibrahim
- Valter Skarsgård as Jon Knutsson
- Azher Adil as Brosoa
- Mohamed Tsouli as Village Elder
- Göran Ragnerstam as Bishop Erland
- Callum Mitchell as Viking
- Barnaby Kay as Riddare

== Language ==
In addition to Swedish as the film's primary language, several other languages were used in the dialogue to heighten the cultural differences: Norwegian, Danish, English, and Arabic.

English was used to represent Latin and French speakers.

The part of the dialogue that is not in Swedish was subtitled in Swedish.

== Music ==
Music composed by Tuomas Kantelinen. Closing song by Marie Fredriksson, the lead singer for Roxette.

== Reception ==
Paul B. Sturtevant considers the story of Arn as an epic, but in his opinion the film narrative of Arn only turns into an epic during and after the second movie Arn - The Kingdom at Road's End, when Arn returns to Sweden bringing multicultural craftsmen and doctors to build a new home. After the victory against the Sverker Army and Danish soldiers, his legacy is ensured and revealed in the closing title of the movie: "Arn Magnusson's victory secured the peace for many years. Thanks to him, the country was soon united as the Kingdom of Sweden." The important matter for Sturtevant and the core of the movie, is the epic and myth of the national foundation of Sweden itself. He sees similarities between the myth and the contemporary Swedish self-image of a society built upon multicultural cooperation.

Sturtevant also adds that contemporary Sweden takes pride in neutrality and pacifism which is reflected in Arns's last battle speech:

"Listen to me! Have no doubt. Believe! Believe in our victory. We chose this place. Not the Danes, and not the Sverkers. We chose this time, not the Danes and not the Sverkers. Believe. God stands by those who are strong in faith. That is why we shall win and peace shall reign."

Through this statement, the fictional character Arn is paving the way for his grandson Birger Jarl, who was a real-life statesman in thirteenth-century Sweden. Sturtevant sees Arn's final act in The Kingdom at Road's End as the beginning of forging the Swedish nation and identity.

=== Award ===
The second Arn movie won the viewer's award at the 44th Guldbagge Awards.

== See also ==
- List of historical drama films

== Sources ==
- Elliott, Andrew B.R. (2014). The Return of The Epic Film - genre, aesthetics and history in the 21st century. Edinburgh University Press. ISBN 978-0-7486-8402-1.
