= Arn: The Knight Templar =

2007 Swedish epic film

- Theatrical poster
- Directed by: Peter Flinth
- Written by: Jan Guillou (novels); Hans Gunnarsson (screenplay)
- Produced by: Waldemar Bergendahl; Leif Mohlin; Jan Marnell
- Starring: Joakim Nätterqvist; Sofia Helin; Stellan Skarsgård; Simon Callow; Vincent Perez; Bibi Andersson; Michael Nyqvist; Milind Soman
- Narrated by: Sven-Bertil Taube
- Cinematography: Eric Kress
- Edited by: Olivier Bugge Coutté; Anders Villadsen
- Music by: Tuomas Kantelinen
- Distributed by: Svensk Filmindustri
- Release date: 17 December 2007 (Sweden)
- Running time: 139 minutes
- Countries: Sweden; Denmark; Norway; Finland; Germany
- Languages: Swedish; English; Latin; Arabic; French
- Budget: SEK 210,000,000 (ca. US $30,000,000) (total budget of both films)

Arn: The Knight Templar (Swedish: Arn: Tempelriddaren) is an epic film based on Jan Guillou's trilogy about the fictional Swedish Knight Templar Arn Magnusson. The film was released to cinemas in Sweden on 17 December 2007 and the sequel, Arn – The Kingdom at Road's End (Arn – Riket vid vägens slut), was released 22 August 2008, but both films were combined into a single cut for the English release on DVD in 2010. While the film is mostly in Swedish and most of the production was made in Sweden, the film is a joint production between Sweden, Denmark, Norway, Finland and Germany. With a total budget of around SEK 210 million (ca. US $30 million) for both films, it is the most expensive production in Swedish cinema. The film grossed $22.5 million according to Box Office Mojo.

The original movie follows the first two volumes of Guillou's trilogy. An "international" version has been created which incorporates this film and its sequel Arn – The Kingdom at Road's End into a single cut with a duration of approximately 130 minutes.

== Plot ==
Arn Magnusson is a son of the powerful Folkung dynasty in the mid-12th century. He grows up in a monastery belonging to the Cistercians and is trained there in archery, swordsmanship and horsemanship by a former Knight Templar, the brother Guilbert. Arn is also discovered to be ambidextrous. One day, while wandering the woods, he encounters three men trying to force a young girl into marriage. When the girl begs Arn for help, two of the men attack him and he kills them in self-defense. Although the monks tell Arn he did nothing wrong, they question Guilbert training him in being a warrior. Guilbert replies that Arn is not meant to be a monk but is destined to be a soldier of God.

When Arn leaves the monastery and returns to his family, he is soon pulled into the struggle between powerful families fighting for the crown of Västra Götaland. He helps his friend Knut Eriksson to kill the old king Karl Sverkersson. This leads to war between the two factions. Arn and his fiancée Cecilia Algotsdotter are excommunicated for premarital relations and falsely accused of having relations with Cecilia's sister (in reality a plot to hurt Knut) and forced to undertake twenty years of penance, Cecilia in a convent and Arn as a Knight Templar in the Holy Land to fight against the Saracens. Cecilia gives birth to Arn's son but the son is taken away from her and she hears only of his survival, and name of Magnus, through another woman who is also named Cecilia, the future queen of Sweden, Cecilia Blanka.

While pursuing a band of thieves, Arn comes across the enemy of all Christendom, Saladin, and saves his life. Saladin thanks Arn by warning him away from Jerusalem because he is leading a vast army towards the city. As Saladin marches upon Jerusalem, Arn is given the order to intercept the Saracens before they reach the city, and he and his men successfully ambush Saladin's army in a mountain pass (the ambush taking the place of the historical Battle of Montgisard figuring in the novel). The movie ends with Arn gaining a letter discharging him from his service in the Holy Land from the Templar Grandmaster Arnold of Torroja and Cecilia giving praise to God on hearing news of Arn's survival.

== Cast ==
- Joakim Nätterqvist as Arn Magnusson
- Sofia Helin as Cecilia Algotsdotter
- Stellan Skarsgård as Birger Brosa, uncle of Arn
- Vincent Pérez as Brother Guilbert
- Simon Callow as Father Henry
- Steven Waddington as Torroja
- Jørgen Langhelle as King Erik Jedvardsson
- Gustaf Skarsgård as King Knut Eriksson
- Michael Nyqvist as Magnus Folkesson, Arn's father
- Bibi Andersson as Mother Rikissa
- Sven-Bertil Taube as Bishop Bengt
- Milind Soman as Saladin
- Alex Wyndham as Armand de Gascogne
- Nicolas Boulton as Gerard de Ridefort
- Thomas W. Gabrielsson as Emund Ulvbane
- Jakob Cedergren as Ebbe Sunesson
- Julia Dufvenius as Helena Sverkersson
- Lina Englund as Katarina, Cecilia's sister
- Morgan Alling as Eskil Magnusson, Arn's brother
- Fanny Risberg as Cecilia Blanka
- Anders Baasmo Christiansen as the Norwegian templar Harald Øysteinsson
- Driss Roukhe as Fakhir
- Mirja Turestedt as Sigrid
- Joel Kinnaman as Sverker Karlsson

== Production ==
=== Development ===
The film production was headed by Svensk Filmindustri in conjunction with Film i Väst, TV4 (Sweden), Danmarks Radio (Denmark), YLE (Finland), TV 2 (Norway) and Telepool (Germany). With a total budget of around US $30,000,000 for the whole production, it is the most expensive production in Scandinavian film history. SVT originally was one of the biggest sponsors of the project, but they pulled out and their role as a major sponsor was taken over by TV4.

=== Filming ===
Most of the Swedish scenes were filmed in the province of Västergötland. Other scenes were filmed in Scotland and Morocco. Most of the actors in the film speak Swedish, while others speak Latin, English, and French. The scenes in the Holy Land use English (although historically it would have been Medieval Latin and Old French) and Arabic, including quotations from the Qur'an.

== Soundtrack ==
Arn: The Knight Templar (Music from the motion picture)

Soundtrack album by Tuomas Kantelinen
- Released: 2007-12-19
- Length: 45:28
- Label: Bonnier Music

Singles from Snö
- 1. "Snö" Released: 19 December 2007

The music for the movie was composed by Tuomas Kantelinen. Laleh also recorded the theme song for the film, entitled "Snö,". The track was released as a single in 2007 and was later placed as a track on her 2009 album Me and Simon. "Snö" peaked at #14 on the Swedish Singles Chart.

=== Track listing ===
1. "Snö" by Laleh - 4:30
2. "Prologe" - 1:07
3. "Desert Hunt" - 2:49
4. "The Templar's Theme" - 0:59
5. "To Varnhems Abbey" - 1:48
6. "Longing" - 3:34
7. "Avresan" - 1:04
8. "Gratias" - 3:26
9. "Arn & Cecilia" - 3:20
10. "Adiago" 2:17
11. "Nightmare" - 1:06
12. "The Sword" 1:45
13. "The Abbey" - 2:03
14. "Axevalla tvekamp" - 2:31
15. "The Templar's triumf" - 1:28
16. "Saladin's camp" - 0:37
17. "The land of home" - 1:48
18. "The Arrival" - 1:09
19. "Nuns" - 0:58
20. "West Götaland" - 2:35
21. "Reward" - 1:27
22. "The End" - 2:36
23. "Snö" by Laleh - 4:30

== Reception ==
The Guardian credited the film with an exciting plot and convincing acting, and locations that "you don't get bored [of] for a second". However, it criticised the story for not being very believable as the Knights Templar were – according to the Guardian – religious fundamentalists, not "tolerant and multicultural-friendly crusaders".

== See also ==
- In hoc signo vinces, sword inscription
- Battle of Hattin
- Third Crusade
- List of historical drama films
