= The Road to Jerusalem =

1998 novel by Jan Guillou

- Author: Jan Guillou
- Original title: Vägen till Jerusalem
- Language: Swedish
- Series: The Knight Templar
- Genre: Historical novel
- Publisher: Norstedts Förlag
- Publication date: July 1998
- Publication place: Sweden
- Media type: Print (Hardback & Paperback) & Audio Book & E-book
- Pages: 366 pp
- ISBN: 91-1-300565-0
- OCLC: 40467730
- Dewey Decimal: 839.73/74 21
- LC Class: PT9876.17.U38 V34 1998
- Followed by: The Knight Templar

The Road to Jerusalem (Swedish: Vägen till Jerusalem) is the first book in Jan Guillou's The Knight Templar book series. The book follows the fictional character of Arn Magnusson from his birth and until he sets off to Jerusalem.

Arn is born in Arnäs, Sweden in the year 1150. At the age of 5, he has an accident while climbing a scaffold and is saved due to his mother's prayers to Saint Bernard of Clairvaux. The conditions stated in the prayer for their sons salvation is that he will be donated to God's work on earth. He is to be sent to Varnhem Abbey, to which his mother has donated the land and is so counted as its founder. Because of a dispute of the validity of the donation the Queen of the Swedes harasses the Cistercian monks into flight. The abbot and his subjects relocate to Denmark awaiting the excommunication of the Swedish royal family.

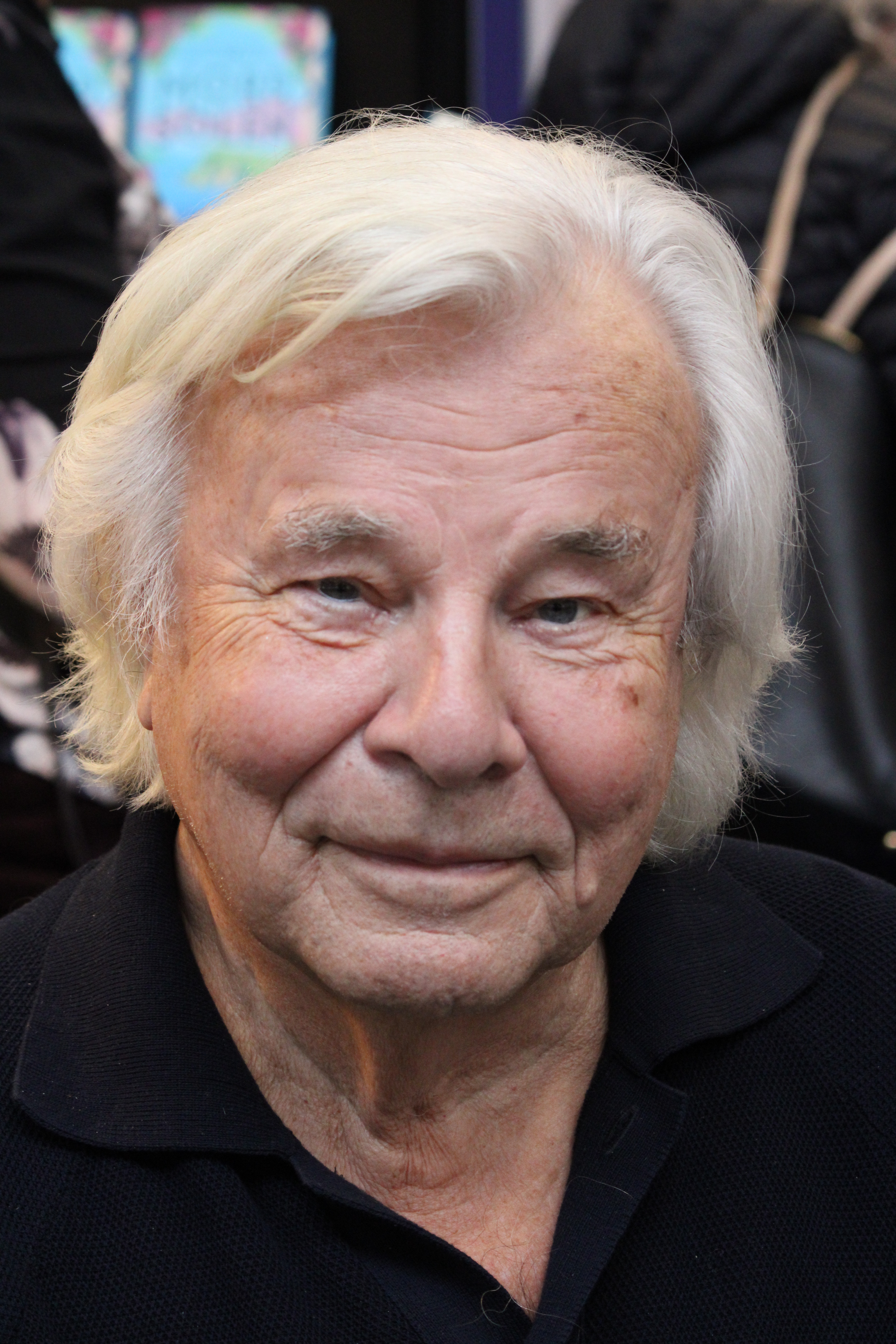
Jan Guillou

One of the brothers of Varnhem and Danish Vitae Scholae is brother Guilbert, a former Knight Templar, who instructs him in the use of the sword and the art of medieval warfare in the Holy Lands. After relocating back to Varnhem again, the Prior of the convent, Father Henri, instructs Arn to witness the outside world for himself before taking the vows of poverty, chastity and obedience (q.v. Evangelical counsels). Arn does so, but falls into the terrible sin of having sexual intercourse with Cecelia, who is also in the nunnery. Cecelia gets pregnant and tells her sister Katarina. Katarina is jealous and tells the Head Mother that not only has Cecelia had sex with Arn, but reveals that Arn has had carnal knowledge before marriage with herself as well (she seduced him while he was drunk after his first visit to her father's homestead). Arn is then condemned to spend twenty years in the Holy Land, as a Knight Templar, and Cecelia is kept in the nunnery and sentenced to twenty years of penance in the convent of Gudhem; her boy child is taken away from her.

== See also ==
- The Knight Templar (Crusades trilogy)
- The Knight Templar (1999), ISBN 91-1-300733-5 the second book in the series
- The Kingdom at the End of the Road (2000), ISBN 91-89426-02-9 the third book in the series
- The Heritage of Arn (2001), ISBN 91-642-0003-5 a follow-up about Birger Jarl, the founder of Stockholm - fictionalized to be Arn's grandson
