= Siege of Jacob's Ford =

Component of the Crusades (1179)

- Part of the Crusades
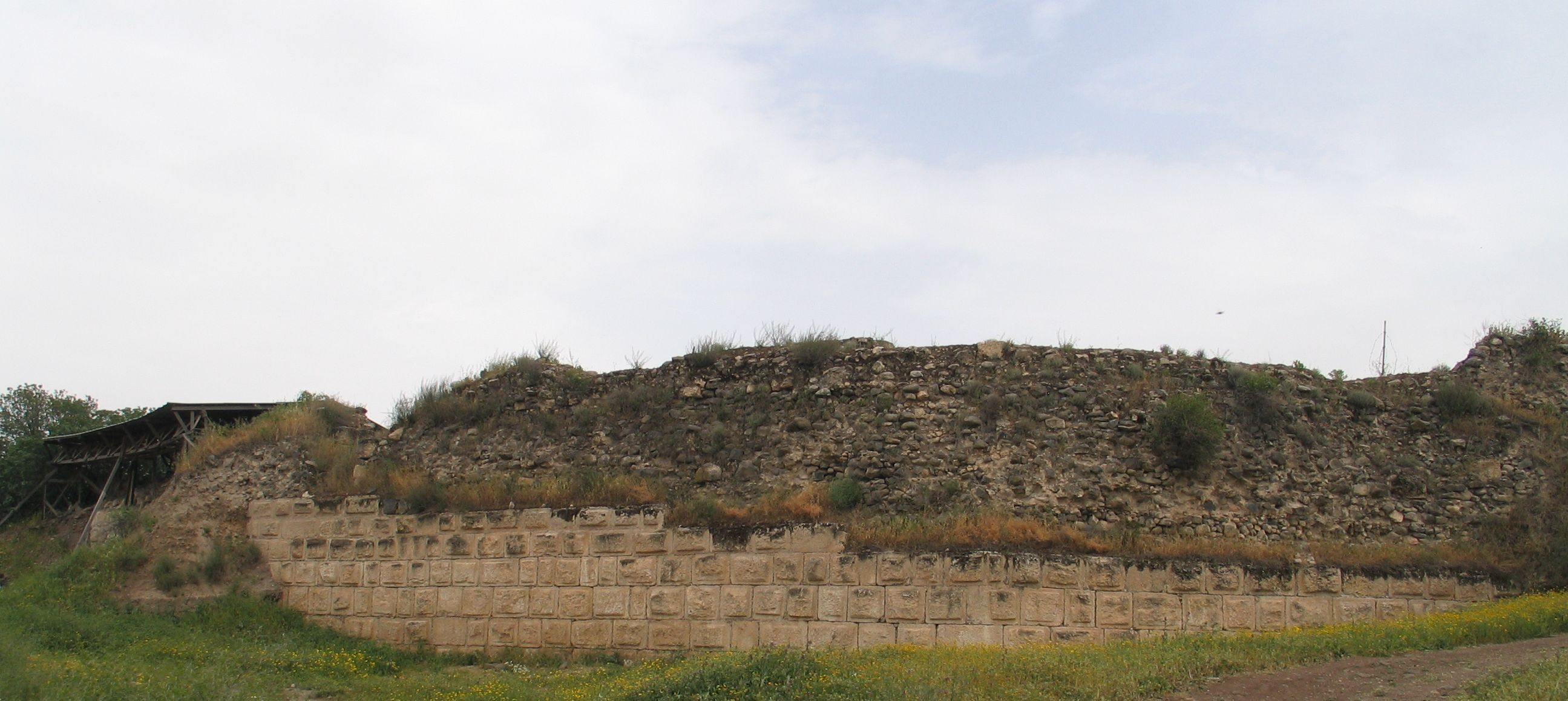
- The Ruins of the Crusader Fortress in Jacob's Ford
Date	23–30 August 1179
Location	Jacob's Ford, Kingdom of Jerusalem 33°0′17″N 35°37′37″E
Result	Ayyubid victory
Territorial changes	Ayyubid Capture of Jacob's Ford

Belligerents
Kingdom of Jerusalem	Ayyubid Dynasty

Commanders and leaders
Odo de St Amand (surrendered)	Saladin; Nur ad-Din Nuhammad bin Kara Arslan Ortoki; Badr al-Din Dolderim al-Yaruki

Strength
1,500 Crusaders	Unknown

Casualties and losses
Total : 1,500+ casualties 800 killed 700 captured	Unknown

The siege of Jacob's Ford was a victory of the Muslim Sultan Saladin over an unnamed Templar Castellan of Jacob's Ford. It occurred in August 1179, when Saladin conquered and destroyed Chastelet, a new border castle built by the Knights Templar at Jacob's Ford on the upper Jordan River, a historic passage point between the Golan Heights and north Galilee. Jacob's Ford is also known by the Latin name of Vadum Iacob and in modern Hebrew as Ateret. Many scholars believe that Saladin's reconquest of the Holy Land and Jerusalem in 1187 was heralded by this earlier victory.

== Background ==
Saladin was Sultan of Egypt and, by 1174, Sultan of Syria after his takeover of Damascus. After seizing power in Syria, Saladin vowed to forge an Islamic empire around Jerusalem. Naturally, the end goal was to recapture the Holy City of Jerusalem from the Crusaders, a significant stride towards an end to the Jihad. However, such a plan would take the Holy Land without major military conflict.

Baldwin IV took control over the Kingdom of Jerusalem at the age of thirteen after the death of his father Amalric I in 1174, the same year that Saladin came to power. Baldwin was a staunch believer in Christianity and, as a result, Saladin's biggest problem to overcome. Although Baldwin was a rich and powerful leader, he was stricken with leprosy at a very young age.

After approximately three years on the throne at Jerusalem, Baldwin was faced with his very first military challenge. Saladin invaded the Christian Kingdom in approximately 1177 to rout the Crusaders. Although Saladin was almost twenty years older and more experienced than Baldwin, the youthful Christian King did not flounder in stressful situations. Baldwin and his Crusaders outwitted the Muslims at the battle of Montgisard on 25 November 1177. As one Crusade scholar wrote with regards to Montgisard, "[t]his was a striking achievement – the only defeat in pitched battle that Saladin suffered before the advent of Richard the Lionheart and the Third Crusade". By the end of the battle, Saladin was forced to flee back to Egypt after narrowly escaping death. Although the victory resulted in tremendous losses for Baldwin's armies, his image throughout the kingdom gained in strength. In fact, some Christians in the Near East had even come to believe that 'miracle' of his victory [at Montgisard] appear[ed] as a sign of divine mandate".

== History ==
Jacob's Ford is approximately one hundred miles north of Jerusalem at the Jordan River and was a key river crossing on one of the main roads between Acre and Damascus. Jacob's Ford was also one of the safest crossings of the Jordan and, because of its location and importance, was utilized by Christian Palestine and Muslim Syria as a major intersection between the two civilizations. In the twelfth century, Baldwin and Saladin continually contested over the area on which Jacob's Ford was situated. As a bold strategic move and as a result of his military victory at Montgodard, Baldwin decided to march to Jacob's Ford and build a defensive fortress on its territory. The King Baldwin IV of Jerusalem and his Crusaders theorized that such a fortification could protect Jerusalem from a northern invasion and put pressure on Saladin's stronghold at Damascus.

Between October 1178 and April 1179, Baldwin IV began the first stages of constructing his new line of defense, a fortification called Chastelet. While construction was in progress, Saladin became fully aware of the task he would have to overcome at Jacob's Ford if he were to protect Syria and conquer Jerusalem. At the time, he was unable to stop the erection of Chastelet by military force because a large portion of his troops were stationed in northern Syria, putting down Muslim rebellions. As one author writes, "Saladin was always at pains to portray himself as the champion of Islam against the European intruders, although in fact he spent much of, if not more, of his career involved in a war against other Muslims." Consequently, the sultan turned to bribery and offered Baldwin 60,000 dinars to halt construction. Baldwin declined, but Saladin made a counter-offer of 100,000 dinars. The Christian King Baldwin IV of Jerusalem refused again and continued to build Chastelet. By the summer of 1179, Baldwin's forces had constructed a stone wall of massive proportions. "The Castle now had a formidable ten met[er] high wall – what one Arabic contemporary later described as ‘an impregnable rampart of stone and iron’ – and a single tower, but it was still a work in progress." In April 1179, Baldwin gave command of Jacob's Ford to the Knights Templar.

== Plans and tactics ==
After Baldwin IV refused both bribes, Saladin turned his attention away from the uprisings in northern Syria and focused on Jacob's Ford and the Castle of Chastelet. He was fully aware that any further bargaining or negotiations would only be in vain and that the more time he wasted, the more time Baldwin IV would have to complete his massive fortification. In 1179, only a few months after construction of Chastelet began, Saladin summoned a large Muslim army to march southeast towards Jacob’s Ford. The plan was simple: lay siege to the castle and its inhabitants before any reinforcements from Jerusalem or any of its neighboring territories could arrive.

Baldwin IV of Jerusalem, on the other hand, was situated at Tiberias, a province situated on the Sea of Galilee, approximately a half day's march from Jacob's Ford. Tiberias was 65–75 km away by road or path. If any attack were to befall his project, reinforcements would be able to arrive relatively quickly. Moreover, the fortification at Jacob’s Ford, at least what was completed of it, was relatively strong and was likely able to hold out until relief could arrive in case of siege. As one Crusades author asserts and inquisitively asks, "[t]he siege was effectively a race – could the Muslims crack the stronghold's defenses before the Latin forces arrived?"

== Siege ==
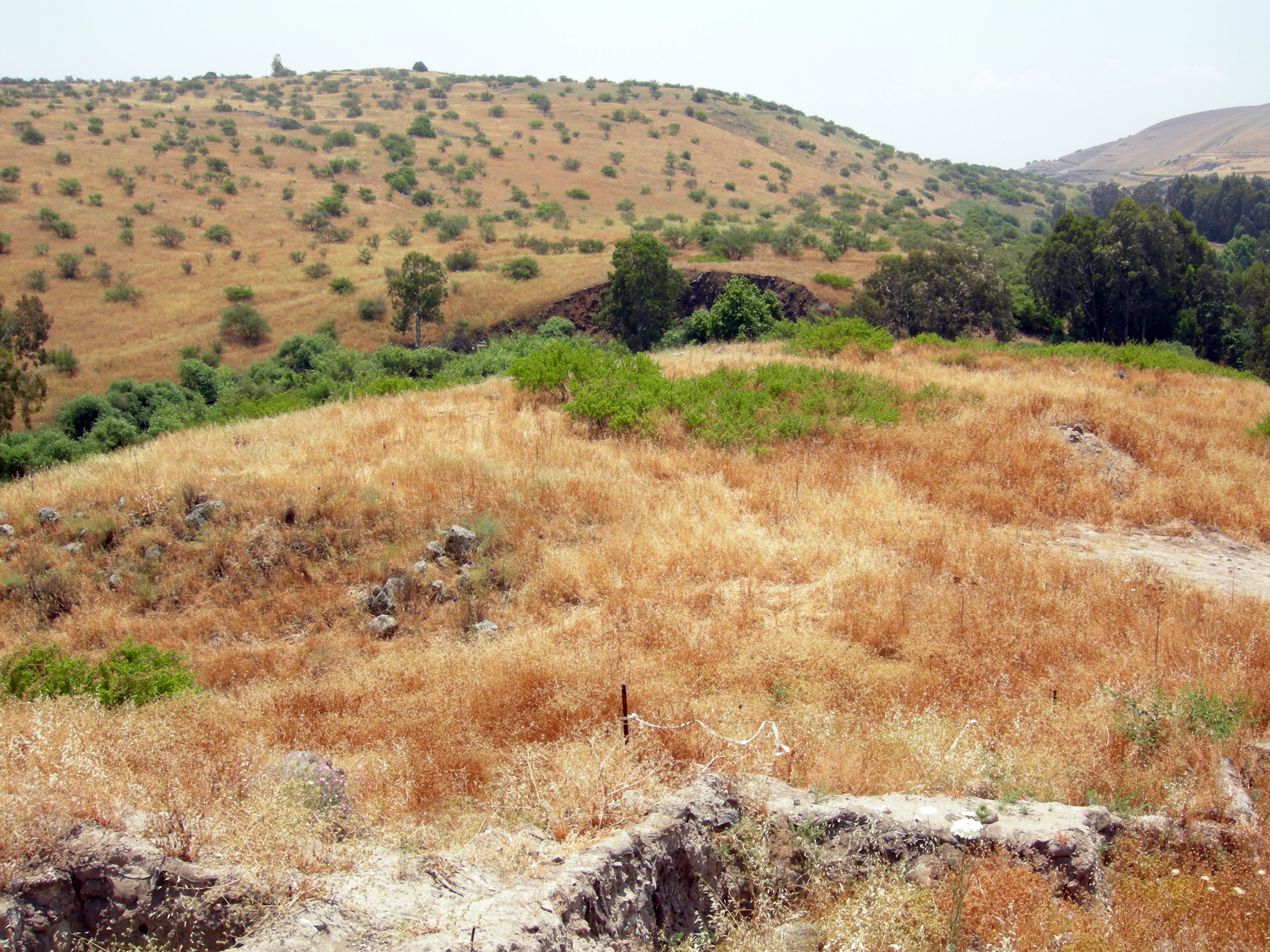
Jacob's Ford Battlefield (1179) viewed from the Chastelet main gateway to the east across the Jordan River

On 23 August 1179, Saladin arrived at Jacob's Ford and ordered his troops to shoot arrows at the castle, thus initiating the siege. While the archers distracted the men inside the fortification, miners were digging a tunnel to breach the stone and iron walls at the north-east corner of Chastelet. Once the tunnel was dug, Saladin's forces placed large amounts of wood inside and set it alight. This process, called sapping, was a method in which the tunnel's supports were burnt away forcing the walls to eventually collapse under their own weight. The walls didn't collapse, because the tunnel was too narrow. Sapping initially failed for Saladin and his troops, so the troops were forced to put out the fire with buckets of water and were paid one gold piece per bucket to do so. After the fire was extinguished, the miners were instructed to broaden the tunnel and eventually relight the fire. At the same time, King Baldwin IV, having learned of this attack, called for reinforcements from Jerusalem. However, communications between Baldwin and Chastelet were slow and, by this time, the siege had been under way for several days. The identity of the Templar Castellan remains unknown.

The Templar Castellan's forces inside the castle began to reinforce the main gates around the Castle. Shortly after, the Muslims relit the fire in the tunnel under the castle, and the walls collapsed. As a result, the Crusaders' attempts to refortify the castle were in vain and, approximately six days after the siege began, Saladin and his troops entered Chastelet. By 30 August 1179, the Muslim invaders had pillaged the castle at Jacob's Ford and killed most of its residents. On the same day, less than one week after reinforcements were called, Baldwin IV of Jerusalem and his supporting army set out from Tiberias, only to discover smoke permeating the horizon directly above Chastelet. Obviously, they were too late to save the 700 Knights, architects, and construction workers who were killed and the other 800 who were taken captive. Baldwin and his reinforcements turned back towards Tiberias and Saladin ordered the remains of the fortification to be torn down.

== Aftermath ==
Although Saladin claimed a military victory at Chastelet, his troops fell victim to another enemy. Directly after the siege, the bodies of the 700 Crusaders killed at Jacob's Ford were placed into a pit. The corpses in the pit began to decay in the August heat and, as a result, a plague ensued, killing approximately ten of Saladin's senior officers. However, this setback did not diminish Saladin's military prowess. In 1180, Saladin and Baldwin signed a truce. Seven years after this peace treaty between the Muslims and the Christians, Saladin captured Jerusalem from the Crusaders after the Battle of Hattin in 1187.

Some scholars suggest that, following Saladin's victory at Jacob's Ford in 1179, Jerusalem was extremely vulnerable to capture because "the entry into the Kingdom of Jerusalem by way of the Jordan crossing immediately south of Lake Tiberias, used [by] Saladin in 1182, 1184, and 1187 was virtually undefended". However, that crossing has nothing to do with the more northerly Jacob's Ford, and beside that it was only some ten kilometres south from the fortified and garrisoned Crusader town of Tiberias, capital of the Principality of Galilee, this being one among several Crusader strongholds in the eastern Galilee and Jordan Valley, which leaves space for debate.

After the capture of Jerusalem, Saladin remained militarily and politically successful in the Near East until a military encounter with Richard the Lionheart, after which he was forced to make peace in 1192. He died the next year. Meanwhile, King Baldwin IV, afflicted with leprosy, died in 1185 at age twenty-three.

== For succession of related campaigns see also ==
- 1177: Battle of Montgisard
- 1179: Battle of Banias
- 1179: Battle of Marj Ayyun
- 1182: Battle of Belvoir Castle
- 1183: Battle of Al-Fule
- 1183: Siege of Kerak
- 1187: Battle of Cresson
- 1187: Battle of Hattin
- 1187: Siege of Jerusalem
- 1187: Siege of Tyre
