= The Knight Templar =

1999 novel by Jan Guillou

- First edition (Swedish)
- Author: Jan Guillou
- Original title: Tempelriddaren
- Language: Swedish
- Series: The Knight Templar (Crusades trilogy)
- Genre: Historical novel
- Publisher: Norstedts Förlag
- Publication date: June 1999
- Publication place: Sweden
- Media type: Print (Hardback & Paperback) & Audio Book & E-book
- Pages: 419 pp
- ISBN: 91-1-300733-5
- OCLC: 43500046
- Dewey Decimal: 839.73/74 21
- LC Class: PT9876.17.U38 T46 1999
- Preceded by: The Road to Jerusalem
- Followed by: The Kingdom at the End of the Road

The Knight Templar (Swedish: Tempelriddaren) is the second book in the Crusades trilogy by Jan Guillou. This book follows the fictional character of Arn Magnusson as a Knight Templar in the kingdom of Jerusalem. The book starts in Arn's 27th year and ends as he departs the holy lands.

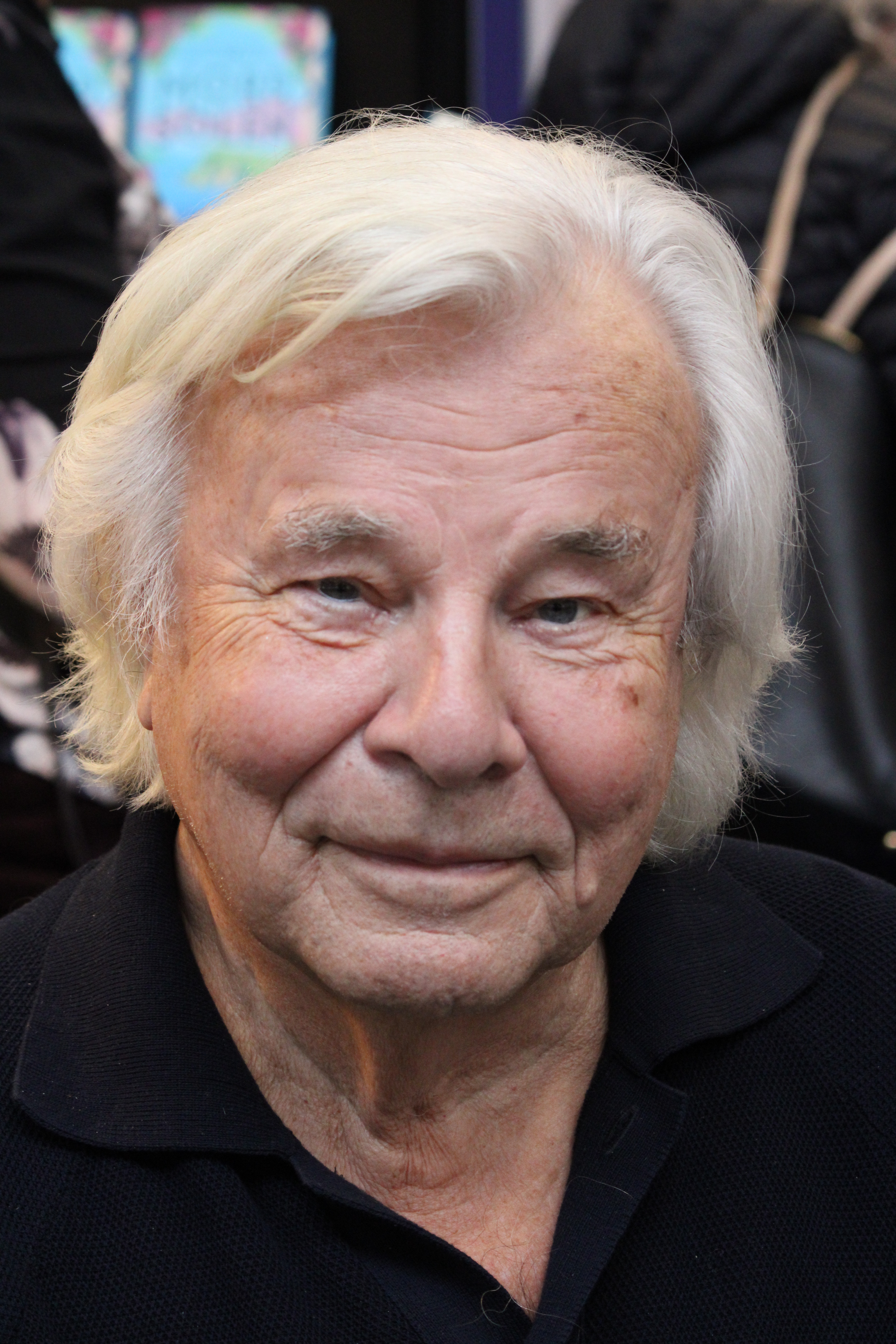
Jan Guillou

== Rescuing Saladin ==
At the age of 27, Arn is already a veteran in the Crusader army, when he faces the strangest experience a Knight Templar can have. While pursuing a band of saracen thieves, he comes across Saladin, the leader of the Muslim forces, and saves his life. They become close friends, but great enemies at the same time. During the conversation with Saladin, Arn learns and deduces that Saladin is preparing an attack on the Kingdom of Jerusalem from the south and brings this information back to Jerusalem. As Arn is the commander of the Templar fort at Gaza, he prepares to take the first blow of Saladin's force, hoping to at least delay Saladin, so that Jerusalem maybe saved, as the King's army at the time is busied with a campaign in the far north.

== Siege of Ascalon ==
After a short siege Saladin spares the city, in part due to Saladin's life being saved by Arn earlier, as he is going for a bigger prize, the city of Jerusalem. Arn is given the order to march with all manpower to break the siege of Ascalon. Arn and his men manage a surprise attack, and together with the knights inside the city they completely crush the siege force. Even though both the Grand Master and two senior Templars are present in Ascalon, command of the Templar forces to pursue Saladin is given to Arn, due to his recent battle luck, seen as the will of God. Saladin still unaware of the broken siege is taken completely by surprise as the Templars charge on his center force in cover of dense fog, and trap the bulk of the Mamluk cavalry in a trench, utterly defeating Saladin's army at the Battle of Montgisard. When Arnaud de Toroge is named Grand Master of the Knights Templar, Arn is summoned to Jerusalem to become Master of the city where he and the Grand Master pursue a religiously tolerant policy with the goal of creating a lasting peace between Christians and Muslims.

== Advisor of Saladin ==
After the death of de Toroge, assassinated by Heraclius, Patriarch of Jerusalem, Gerard of Ridefort is named new Grand Master, and Arn is immediately dismissed from the city and retakes his position in Gaza. Arn now becomes disillusioned by the crusades and in the Battle of Hattin, Arn is severely wounded and spends several weeks at Saladin's hospital in Damascus. He then becomes a personal advisor to Saladin and convinces Saladin to spare the population of Jerusalem, which is conquered (in 1187). Also in Saladin's captivity is Gerard of Ridefort, who, by "persuasion", signs Arn's release note from the order. In the very end of the book, Richard the Lionheart comes to Palestine with an army of crusaders. Richard captures Acre from Saladin, and when Saladin tries to buy back 5,700 prisoners from him, Richard prefers to massacre the populace instead, because some terms had not been fulfilled. Arn is now very eager to return home, and Saladin donates to Arn the remaining sum of money which the Lionheart forsook in his lust for blood. As is told in the following book, Arn travels to Acre, on the way hiring various craftsmen, then obtains a Templar cargo ship and departs for his homeland.

== Civil war in Sweden ==
Meanwhile, Arn's fiancée, Cecilia Algotsdotter, is serving an equally long punishment (20 years) in a convent of Gudhem for the sins she and Arn committed at the age of 17. Gothia is plunged into a civil war over the crown, fought over by the Sverker clan, and the joined forces of the Erik- and Folkung clan. Cecilia being counted as a member of the latter is continuously bullied by the women at the convent, who are all of the Sverker clan. She is later joined by another Cecilia who is of the Erik clan. They thensforth named Cecilia Rosa (Algotsdotter) and Cecilia Blanka, due to their hair colours. Together they outlast the torture of the Sverkers, and especially the Abbess Rikissa, who spare no effort in punishing the two friends. Relief comes as the Eriks and the Folkungs finally defeat the Sverkers at the battle of Bjälbo. Cecilia Blanka, who is the fiancée of the future King, Canute I Ericson begins to haunt the Abess with her coming power, which finally breaks the persistent torture of the two. The two also befriend a young Sverker maid, Ulvhilde Emundsdotter, ironically the daughter of the man who was famously defeated by Arn Magnusson and later slain by Canute. The three form a lifelong friendship and with their wit and cunning eventually become a ruling force in the nation (more so in the following books).

== See also ==
- The Knight Templar (Crusades trilogy)
- The Road to Jerusalem (1998), ISBN 91-1-300565-0 the first book in the series
- The Kingdom at the End of the Road (2000), ISBN 91-89426-02-9 the third book in the series
- The Heritage of Arn (2001), ISBN 91-642-0003-5 a follow-up about Birger Jarl, the founder of Stockholm - fictionalized to be Arn's grandson
