= The Heritage of Arn =

2001 book by Jan Guillou

- Swedish first edition cover
- Author: Jan Guillou
- Original title: Arvet efter Arn
- Language: Swedish
- Genre: Historical novel
- Publisher: Piratförlaget
- Publication date: June 2001
- Publication place: Sweden
- Media type: Print (Hardback & Paperback) & Audio Book & E-book
- Pages: 424 pp
- ISBN: 91-642-0003-5
- OCLC: 49309930
- LC Class: PT9876.17.U38 A78 2001
- Preceded by: The Kingdom at the End of the Road

The Heritage of Arn (Swedish: Arvet efter Arn) is a sequel to The Knight Templar (Crusades trilogy) by Jan Guillou about Birger Jarl, the founder of Stockholm - fictionalized to be Arn Magnusson's grandson.

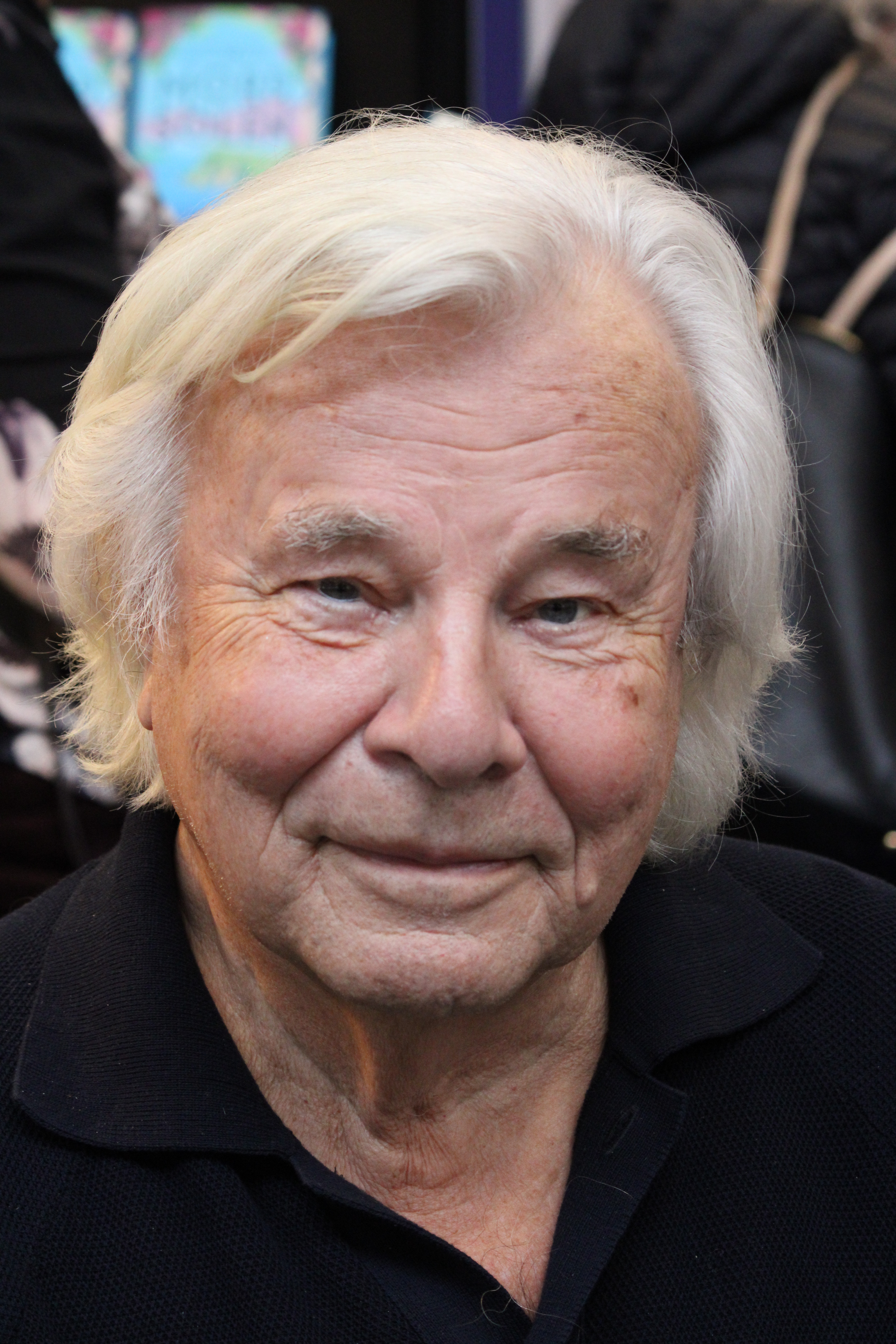
Jan Guillou

The story spans across a transitional period of Scandinavia where the last remnants of the Viking traditions are replaced by continental medieval customs and the Swedes and Geats unite under the hard rule of Birger "Jarl" Magnusson. The novel, based on Swedish history and legends, starts Birger as a young man who has just lost his father Magnus and grandfather Arn Magnusson. Under the eyes of his formidable mother, Ingrid Ylva, he is groomed into a fully fledged general and statesman. Cunning in war, finance, politics and theology, he slowly seizes power over the country, annexes Finland as part of Sweden and eliminates all pretenders to the throne in favour of his own son. Thus concluding the work of making Sweden one single nation.

== See also ==
- The Knight Templar (Crusades trilogy)
- The Road to Jerusalem (1998), ISBN 91-1-300565-0 the first book in the series
- The Knight Templar (1999), ISBN 91-1-300733-5 the second book in the series
- The Kingdom at the End of the Road (2000), ISBN 91-89426-02-9 the third book in the series
