= Gerard of Ridefort =

Grand Master of the Knights Templar from 1184 to 1189

Gérard de Ridefort
- Coat of arms of Gérard de Ridefort

Grand Master of the Knights Templar
- In office 1184–1189
- Preceded by: Arnold of Torroja
- Succeeded by: Robert IV of Sablé

Personal details
- Born: c. 1140
- Died: October 4, 1189 (aged 48–49) Acre

Military service
- Allegiance: Kingdom of Jerusalem; Knights Templar
- Rank: Marshal of Jerusalem (1179-1184); Templar Grand Master (1184-1189)
- Battles/wars: Battle of Cresson (WIA); Battle of Hattin (POW); Third Crusade; Siege of Acre (executed)

Gérard de Ridefort, also called Gerard de Ridefort (died 4 October 1189), was Grand Master of the Knights Templar from the end of 1184 and until his death in 1189.

== Early life ==
Gerard de Ridefort is thought probably to have been of Flemish origin, although some nineteenth-century writers suggested an Anglo-Norman background, apparently through misreading his designation as "of Bideford". It is uncertain when he arrived in the Kingdom of Jerusalem. He appears in the charter record in the service of Baldwin IV of Jerusalem in the late 1170s, and by 22 October 1179 held the rank of Marshal of the kingdom.

It seems that he expected Raymond III of Tripoli to give him the hand of an available heiress. However, when Cécile Dorel inherited her father's coastal fief of Botrun in the County of Tripoli, Raymond married her (before March 1181) to Plivain or Plivano, the nephew of a Pisan merchant, for a bride price of 10,000 bezants. By the mid-thirteenth century, when the Old French Continuation of William of Tyre was compiled, the story of the bride of Botrun had evolved into a fanciful legend in which Plivain's uncle put the young lady (there renamed Lucie or Lucia) on the scales, and offered Raymond her weight in gold, to obtain the marriage.

== Templar ==
Gérard fell seriously ill, after which he took vows as a Templar. By June 1183 he held the rank of seneschal of the Order. He was elected Grand Master in late 1184 or early 1185, after the death of Arnold of Torroja in Verona.

Gérard continued to hold a grudge against Raymond of Tripoli, which influenced some of his political manœuvrings. In 1186, when King Baldwin V, successor to the late King Baldwin IV, had died, Gérard quickly took the side of Agnes de Courtenay’s daughter Queen Sibylla and her husband Guy de Lusignan, in the ensuing succession struggle. Raymond and his allies, including the Ibelin family were the leaders of the opposing faction, who supported the claim of Sibylla's younger half-sister Princess Isabella.

In the crisis of 1187, Gérard used the money sent by King Henry II to be deposited with The Templars in Jerusalem to hire additional troops for the arrière ban to defend the Kingdom Of Jerusalem from Saladin. (Henry had sent the funds for his own future crusading plans, in penance for the murder of Thomas Becket; some of it was deposited with the Templars, some with the Knights Hospitalíer, in Jerusalem and Tyre.) Gérard and fewer than 100 Templars, together with some Hospitallers, attacked Saladin's son al-Afdal at the Battle of Cresson in 1187. Al-Afdal, however, had over 5,000 men. The Hospitaller Grand Master Roger de Moulins was killed; Gérard, though wounded, was one of the few survivors. Gérard's report of the battle was the source for a short narrative written by Pope Urban III to Baldwin of Exeter, archbishop of Canterbury.

In July of the same year Gérard led the Templars at the Battle Of Háttin. Saladin had captured Tiberias and Guy was contemplating a march on the city to retake it. Raymond advised him to wait for Saladin to come to them, since they were in a well-defended, well-watered position, and would have to cross a dry open plain to reach Tiberias. Gérard opposed this, and convinced Guy to continue the march. He was supported by Reynald de Châtillon, a fellow enemy of Raymond. The armies of Outremer ended up trapped on the dry plain and were defeated on 4 July. Raymond and several other nobles escaped, but some who were not killed, including Humphrey de Toron IV, Aimery de Lusignan, Reynald, Guy and also Gérard were among those captured by Saladin. The rest of the Templar prisoners were executed. Gérard remained a prisoner until 1188, during which time his Order was commanded by Brother Thierry (Terricus) from Tyre.

Gérard was given the condition by Saladin that, if he could convince a Templar fortress to surrender peacefully, he would be set free. He succeeded and on his release went to Tortosa, where he ably led the Templars' defence of their castle, which held out after the fall of the town to Saladin’s siege forces. Having taken back control of his order from Thierry, he seems to have seized the remainder of King Henry II’s money which had been left with the Templars in Tyre. This provoked a complaint from the city's defender, Conrad of Montferrat, in letters of 20 September 1188 to Baldwin of Exeter and Frederick Barbarossa, even saying: "...graver still, the Master of the Temple has made off with the King of England's alms".

In 1189, he again joined forces with Guy, taking the Templars to the Siege of Acre. After being taken prisoner once more, he was beheaded by Saladin on 4 October 1189.

== In popular culture ==
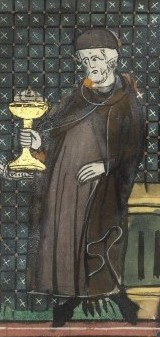
Gerard of Ridefort, as illustrated by Maître de Fauvel in 1337

Gérard de Ridefort is a character in some contemporary novels, films, and video games. He is often depicted as being a hot-headed, vicious, and stubborn religious fanatic, whose self-righteously arrogant, scheming and selfish actions lead to his undoing.

=== Literature ===
- He appears in Jack Whyte's book Standard of Honor as an adversary of Count Raymond.
- Gérard appears in Jan Guillou's Crusades trilogy about the fictional character Arn Magnusson, wherein he is depicted as helping to ensure the latter's release from the Templars.
- In Jerusalem by Cecelia Holland, "Gerard de Ridford" appears as the story's primary antagonist.

=== Games ===
- Gérard is a general of the Kingdom of Jerusalem at the Medieval II: Total War: Kingdoms Crusades Campaign.

=== Films ===
- Gérard was portrayed by Nicholas Boulton in the Swedish 2007 film Arn – The Knight Templar, and its 2008 sequel Arn – The Kingdom at Road's End, each of which depicts him as self-righteous, religiously fanatic, arrogant, and uncompromising.

== Bibliography ==
- Brevis Regni Ierosolymitani Historia, in Annali Genovesi di Caffaro e de’ suoi Continuatori, ed. Luigi Tommaso Belgrano (Fonti per la Storia d’Italia, no. 11), vol. 1 (Genoa, 1890), pp. 127–49.
- De Expugnatione Terræ Sanctæ per Saladinum Libellus, in Ralph of Coggeshall, Radulphi de Coggeshall Chronicon Anglicanum, ed. Joseph Stevenson (London, 1875).
- Peter W. Edbury, The Conquest of Jerusalem and the Third Crusade: Sources in Translation. Ashgate, 1996. [Old French Continuation of William of Tyre; this edition includes translation of Urban III's letter on the battle of Cresson.]
- Reinhold Röhricht (ed.), Regesta Regni Hierosolymitani MXCVII-MCCXCI, and Additamentum (Berlin, 1893–1904)
- Robinson, John J. (1992). Dungeon, Fire and Sword: The Knights Templar in the Crusades. M. Evans. ISBN 9781590771525.
- Roger of Howden, Gesta Regis Henrici Secundi Benedicti Abbatis, ed. William Stubbs (London, 1867).
- Roger of Howden, Chronica Magistri Rogeri de Houedene, ed. William Stubbs (London, 1868–71)

Religious titles
Preceded by Arnold of Torroja	Grand Master of the Knights Templar; 1184–1189	Succeeded by Robert de Sablè
