= Odo of St Amand =

Grand Master of the Knights Templar between 1171 and 1179

Grand Master of the Knights Templar
- In office 1171–1179
- Preceded by: Philip of Nablus
- Succeeded by: Arnold of Torroja

Personal details
- Born: 1110
- Died: October 1180 (aged 69-70)

Military service
- Allegiance: Kingdom of Jerusalem; Knights Templar
- Rank: Marshal of Jerusalem (1155-1156); Templar Grand Master (1171-1179)
- Battles/wars: The Crusades; Battle of Lake Huleh; Battle of Montgisard; Battle of Marj Ayyun

Odo of St. Amand (French: Eudes; 1110 – October 1180) was the master of the Knights Templar, between 1171 and 1179.

== Personal life ==
Odo was born to a noble family from Limousin, France. He was marshal of Jerusalem and later viscount. He was a headstrong leader of the order, which earned him praise and resentment in equal measure. An example of this can be found 1172. When a Templar knight, Gauthier du Maisnil, was accused of murdering an Assassin dignitary to King Amalric, Odo refused to hand him over. He cited the papal bull which stipulated the only power over the Templars was Rome.

== Military career ==
Odo took part in several expeditions during his time as grand master. He spearheaded military action in Naplouse, Jericho and Djerach, scoring considerable victories with the Templars. Perhaps his finest hour was at the battle of Montgisard, where his knights convincingly defeated a superior detachment of Saladin's army.

In March 1179, Odo oversaw the construction of the Chastelet fortress. Its position and impregnability made it a thorn in Saladin's side and he offered considerable amounts of money to have it destroyed. It was so effective that Saladin's May assault on Jerusalem in 1179 was defeated. His forces broke on the fortress's thick walls, and the fierce fighting of the Templars stationed there scored heavy losses on the Muslims. Trying to capitalize on the victory, an assault on the Islamic forces was organized at the Battle of Marj Ayun in 1179. It was spearheaded by King Baldwin IV, Count Raymond III of Tripoli, Odo de St Amand and Roger de Moulins. However, Saladin had regrouped and decimated the Christian forces. Baldwin IV escaped the carnage, taking with him the True Cross, but St. Amand was captured and taken hostage.

In August 1179, the new Templar fortress was captured and the knights stationed there were beheaded by the Muslim forces. Odo died in one of Saladin's jails sometime during 1180, although no exact date survives. His release was proposed, in exchange for one of Saladin's captive nephews, but negotiations came too late.

== Gathering support ==
Not only were Odo's victories important from a military standpoint, but they were vital in gaining fresh pledges of money and resources from homeland countries in Europe. Inspired by the Templars' sensational victory at Montgisard, Renaud, Lord of Margat, donated half of the income from several of his cities to the order's cause.

== Sources ==
- Barber, Malcolm (2012). The New Knighthood. Cambridge University Press.
- Burgtorf, Jochen (2017). "The Templars and the kings of Jerusalem". In Borchardt, Karl; Döring, Karoline; Josserand, Philippe; Nicholson, Helen (eds.). The Templars and their Sources. Vol. 10. Routledge. pp. 25–38.
- Hamilton, Bernard (2000). The Leper King and His Heirs: Baldwin IV and the Crusader Kingdom of Jerusalem. Cambridge University Press.

Religious titles
Preceded by Philippe de Milly	Grand Master of the Knights Templar; 1171–1179	Succeeded by Arnold of Torroja
