= Chastelet =

Castle built and destroyed during the Crusades

Coordinates: 33.0045°N 35.6277°E

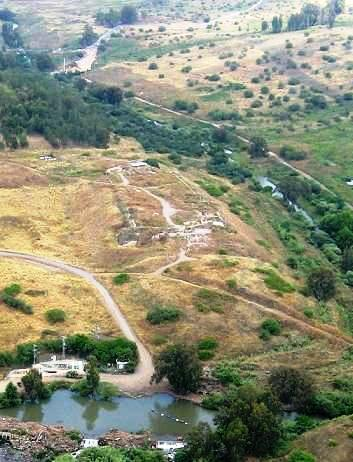
The castle ruins seen from above

Chastelet, also known as Beytulahzan, was a castle located beside Jacob's Ford, a ford of the upper Jordan River in Israel. The castle was built during the Crusades by the Knights Templar and the forces of the Kingdom of Jerusalem but was destroyed by the army of Saladin in 1179.

== Etymology ==
The name of the castle comes from the French word châtelet, meaning a fortified gatehouse. Jacob's Ford is also known by the Latin name of Vadum Iacob and in modern Hebrew as Ateret.

== History ==
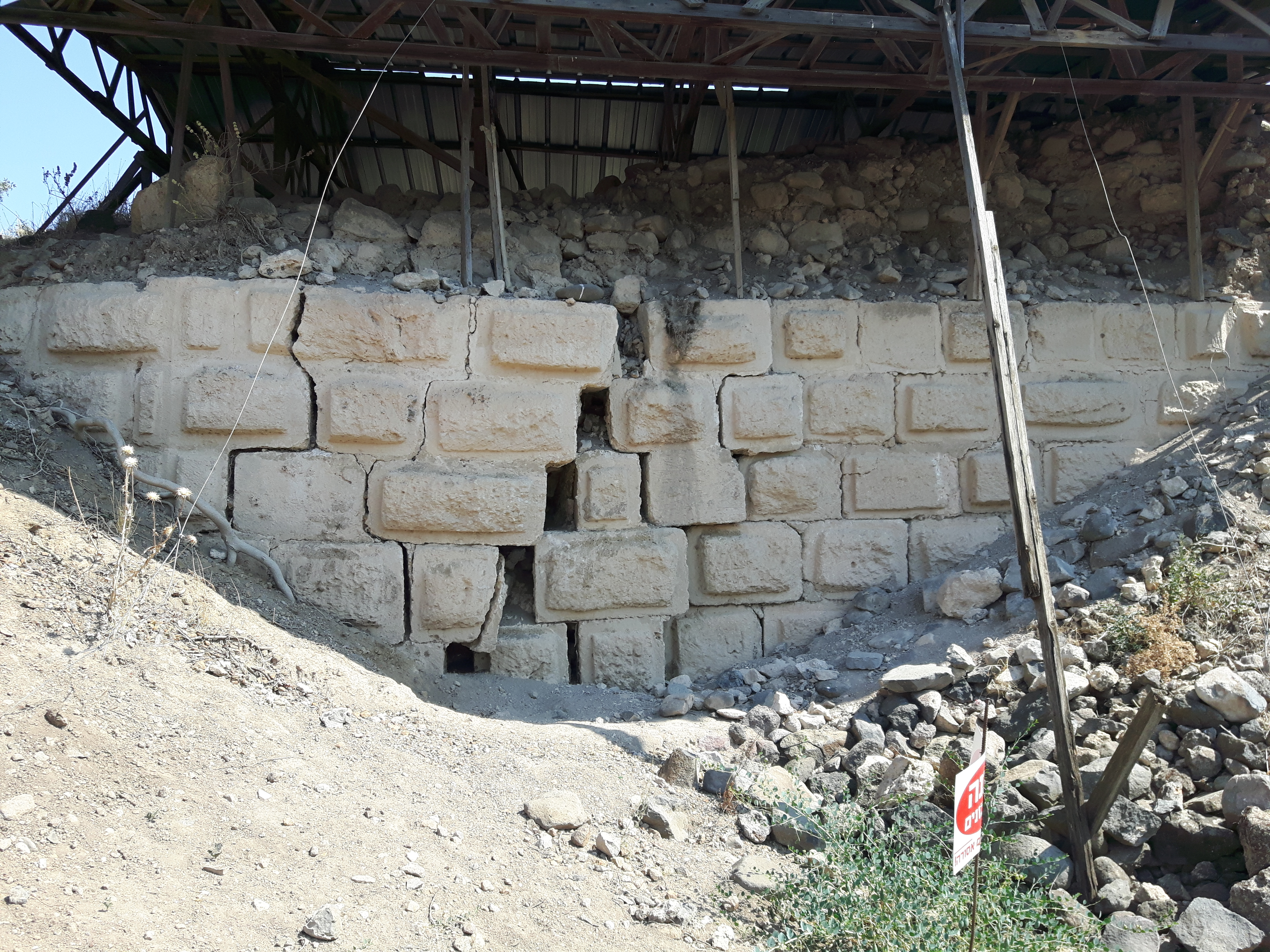
The geological fracture seen on the remains of the northern wall of the Mesad

The castle was intended to act as a bulwark against Muslim incursions into the Kingdom of Jerusalem and to strength protection for pilgrims and traders through Christian Palestine. Jointly constructed by the Knights Templar and the Kingdom of Jerusalem under orders of Baldwin IV of Jerusalem, construction of the castle began in 1178.

By May 1179, the main walls (built of lime, stone and pebbles) and foundations were completed, which included a perimeter wall with five gates, and a tower. The castle was fit for purpose and well-supplied, but not structurally complete. Some 1,500 men camped around the complex. Most of them were knights and sergeants of the military garrison, with several hundred workmen: blacksmiths, builders and Muslim prisoners used as laborers. After hearing of the castle's completion, Saladin brought his army within attacking distance of the castle and offered 60,000 dinars for a peaceful demolition of it. After his offer was rejected, he decided to test its defenses by moving his army to the walls and harassing the defenders with arrows. After one of his commanders was shot by a Templar arrow, Saladin retreated. King Baldwin IV's council sent an army to reinforce the castle, and on the way, they met and defeated a group of Saladin's men on a raiding expedition. The king's cavalry pursued the survivors and ran into Saladin and his main host. In the ensuing battle Saladin defeated the king's army and captured around 270 Christian horsemen, among them Templar master Odo of Saint-Armand. King Baldwin IV managed to escape.

On 24 August 1179, Saladin laid siege to the fortress. His most trusted officers advised a quick attack instead of a regular siege, and the Muslims subsequently barraged the outer defences. When Baldwin IV heard of this, he summoned a host to Tiberias to respond. In the meantime, the Muslims mined the inner walls of the castle, succeeding in digging a tunnel that brought down the main tower. The castle was stormed on 29 August 1179 and captured that same day. The castle's commander was killed in the attack, and 700 survivors taken prisoner. The surviving defenders were executed and the armoury was seized, including some 1,000 coats of armour; the castle was extensively demolished to prevent further use by the Christian forces. The castle fell before the relic of the True Cross could be retrieved from Jerusalem to accompany the Christian troops; since Le Chastellet was built to withstand a lengthy siege, the crusaders saw no reason to hurry. The historian William of Newburgh said that "the Christian army assembled at Tiberias, but not with the speed which was customary."

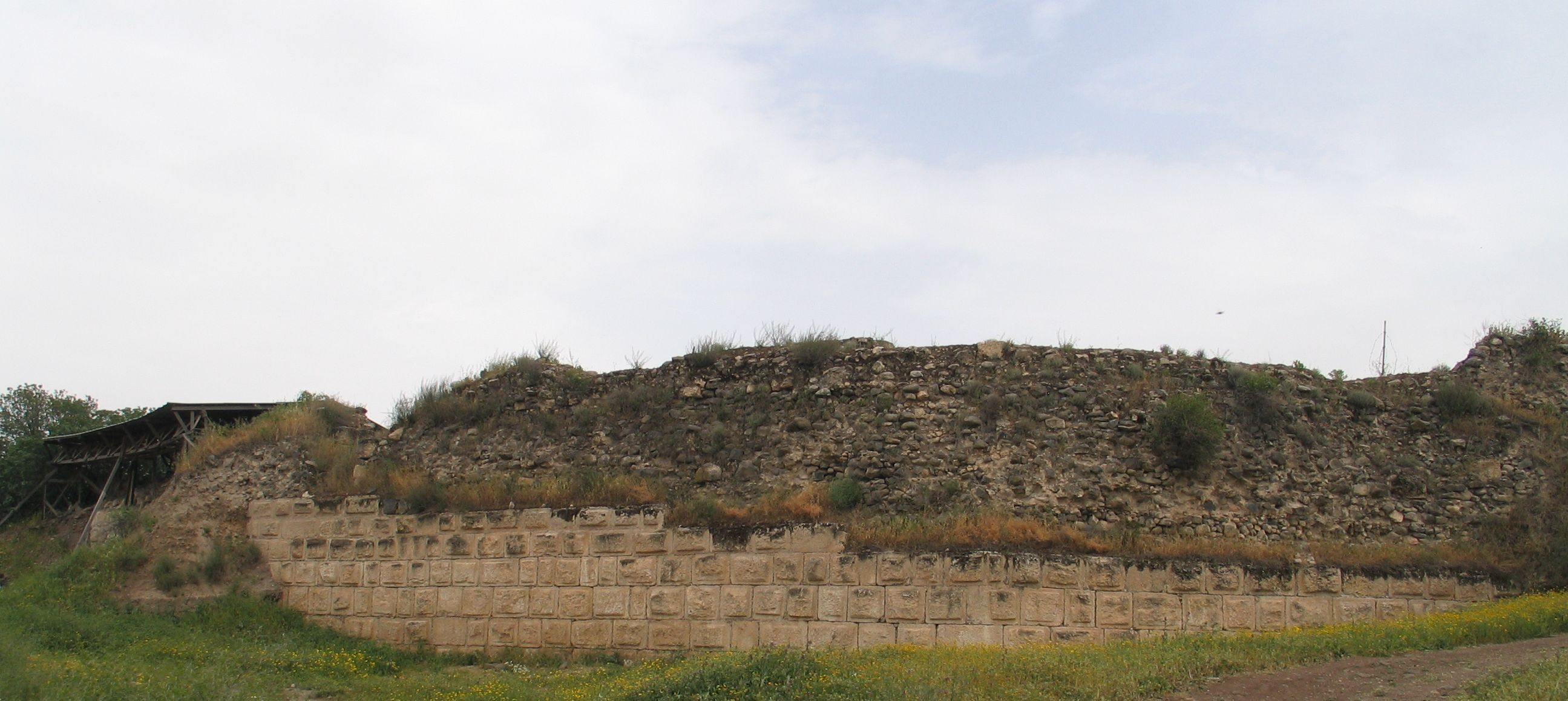
Ruins of the castle walls

In the 20th and early 21st centuries, the castle has been the site of extensive archaeological excavations. These included the discovery of extensive double-chambered baking ovens. Notably, over 160 coins of various types have also been found, providing a key source of coins from the Frankish crusading era.

In 2018, the site underwent a renovation funded with an investment of 1.6 million ILS.

== Sources ==
- Jones, Dan (2017). The Templars: The Rise and Spectacular Fall of God's Holy Warriors. Viking. pp. 178–186. ISBN 978-0525428305.
- Ellenblum, Ronnie (2009). Crusader Castles and Modern Histories. Cambridge University Press. ISBN 9780511497247.
- Jotischky, Andrew (2017). Crusading and the Crusader States. Taylor and Francis. ISBN 9781351983921.
- Kool, Robert (2016). Crusades. Taylor and Francis. ISBN 9781351985871.
- Pringle, Denys (1997). Secular buildings in the Crusader Kingdom of Jerusalem: an archaeological Gazetter. Cambridge University Press. p. 85. ISBN 0521-46010-7.
- Hamilton, Bernard (2000). The Leper King and His Heirs: Baldwin IV and the Crusader Kingdom of Jerusalem. Cambridge University Press. ISBN 9780521017473.
- Mesqui, Jean (2020). Crusading and Archaeology. Routledge. ISBN 9781315142883.
- Reinstein, Ziv (2024-11-14). מצד עתרת העתיק בגולן נפגע מטיל מלבנון. כך הוא נראה עתה - תיירות [Direct damage and significant destruction to one of the ancient fortresses in the north]. וואלה! (in Hebrew).
