= The Kingdom at the End of the Road =

2000 Book by Jan Guillou

- First edition
- Author: Jan Guillou
- Original title: Riket vid vägens slut
- Language: Swedish
- Series: The Knight Templar (Crusades trilogy)
- Genre: Historical novel
- Publisher: Piratförlaget
- Publication date: January 2000
- Publication place: Sweden
- Media type: Print (Hardback & Paperback) & Audio Book & E-book
- Pages: 431 pp
- ISBN: 91-89426-02-9
- OCLC: 45145878
- LC Class: PT9876.17.U38 R55 2000
- Preceded by: The Knight Templar
- Followed by: The Heritage of Arn

The Kingdom at the End of the Road (Swedish: Riket vid vägens slut) is the third book in Jan Guillou's The Knight Templar (Crusades trilogy) book series. This book follows the fictional character of Arn Magnusson as he returns home to Sweden after 20 years as a Knight Templar.

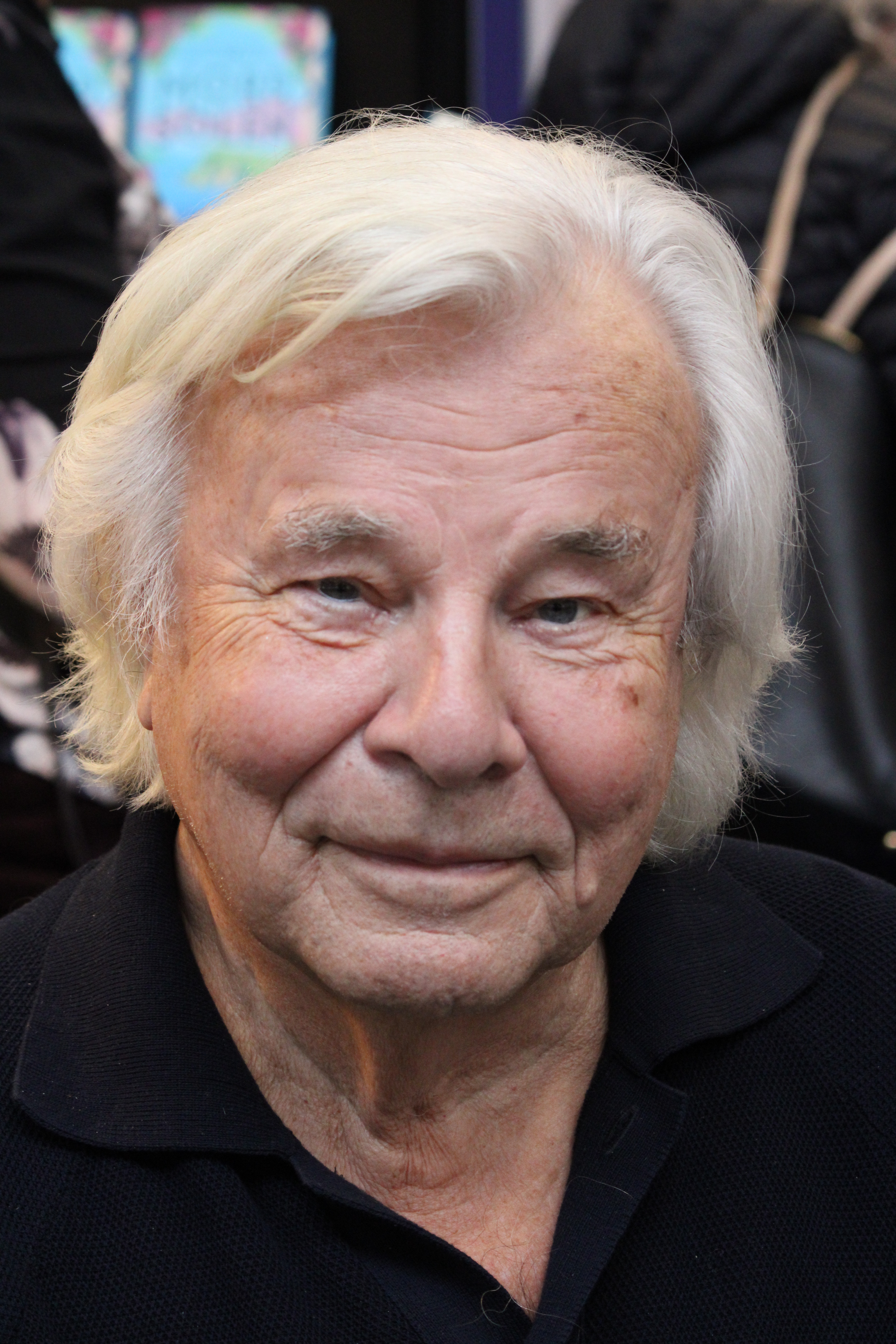
Jan Guillou

The book starts with Arn coming home to the abbey in which he grew up and reuniting with his kinsmen. Arn, now an experienced knight, has great plans for Sweden. To build a superior and centralized fighting force to create a stable peace within the three countries that will one day be known as Sweden. He is also forced to repel two invasions by the Danish-supported pretender to the throne, Sverker Karlsson.

This book covers the last part of Arn's life and argues that Arn is the de facto founding father of modern Sweden.

== See also ==
- The Knight Templar (Crusades trilogy)
- The Road to Jerusalem (1998), ISBN 91-1-300565-0 the first book in the series
- The Knight Templar (1999), ISBN 91-1-300733-5 the second book in the series
- The Heritage of Arn (2001), ISBN 91-642-0003-5 a follow-up about Birger Jarl, the founder of Stockholm - fictionalized to be Arn's grandson
