= Earnaness =

Historic locales in Sweden

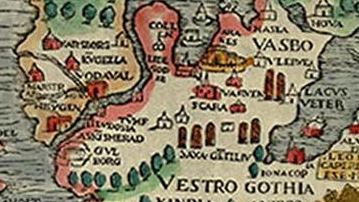
Aranes is the castle in this detail from the Carta Marina (1539)

Earnanæs (Old English), Aranæs (Old Swedish) and Årnäs (Modern Swedish) is the name of at least two locations, in what is today southern Sweden, which are known from history and legend. The names are variations of the same name, and this has aroused the interest of scholars since the 19th century.

== The ancient stronghold ==
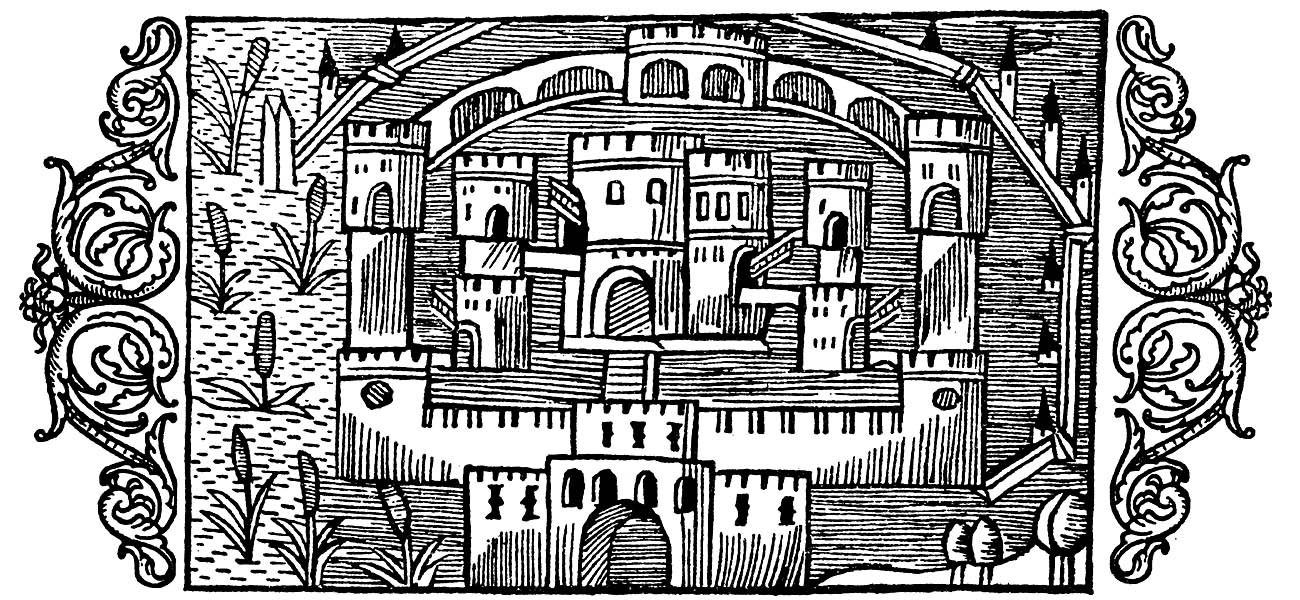
A woodcut of the castle by Olaus Magnus

The ancient stronghold of Aranæs (58°40′N 13°35′E) was located near Skara on the shore of lake Vänern, in Västergötland.

In the early 14th century, it was the property of the marshal and Swedish regent Torkel Knutsson. In this castle, King Birger Magnusson signed a reconciliation treaty with his brothers, the dukes Erik and Valdemar Magnusson. After the two dukes had poisoned the king's mind against his faithful marshal, Torkel was captured and taken to Stockholm, where he was beheaded. The once magnificent stronghold was demolished and the land was given to the convent of Gudhem, on the condition that the nuns should move to Aranæs within a year. The move appears to have been delayed, and instead they moved to Rackeby, in 1349, when they received the estate from King Magnus IV of Sweden. The king renewed his father's endowment of Aranæs to the nuns, and two years later a convent was founded there. The nuns lived at Aranæs for a decade, until the estate passed to the king.

King Albert of Sweden gave the estate to Gerhard Snakenborg in exchange for the castle Axevall, in 1366. In 1371, it was given by king Magnus to bishop Nils of Skara. It was the property of the Diocese of Skara until the Reformation. In 1683, Årnäs passed from the King to private owners. The castle has been the object of several recent archaeological excavations, which have shown that the castle was much larger than was previously expected. Its size is still not known.

== The lost town ==
The other one was the medieval borough Aranæs, a town mentioned in the saga of Håkon Håkonsson, who pillaged and burnt it in 1256. This town was supposedly located south of Gothenburg between Kungsbacka and Varberg in Halland where there is a farm by the name of Årnäs.
