= Vow of obedience =

Religious oath made by some Catholics

In the Catholic Church, the vow of obedience is one of the three vows of professing to live according to the evangelical counsels. It constitutes one of the religious vows which are made both by members of the religious institutes and diocesan hermits.

The 1983 Code of Canon Law (canon 601) defines it as follows:

"The evangelical counsel of obedience, undertaken in a spirit of faith and love in the following of Christ who was obedient even unto death, requires a submission of the will to legitimate superiors, who stand in the place of God when they command according to the proper constitutions."

In relation to Christian discipleship, the Second Vatican Council's Dogmatic Constitution on the Church speaks of "liberty strengthened by obedience".

== Description ==
The vow of obedience is stipulated in

- the novice's respective Church law, for example in the Roman Catholic Church, the 1983 Code of Canon Law (see canons 573, 601, 603.2)
- the respective rule of the order or institute to which the novice belongs.

== Secular clergy ==
Secular clergy promise obedience to their diocesan bishop but they do not take a vow to this effect. The Second Vatican Council's Decree on the Life and Ministry of Priests spoke of "willing responsible obedience" as a manifestation of how they should "conform themselves to Christ".
