= Consolidation of Sweden =

Unification of Sweden under a monarchy

Approximate borders of Sweden in the 12th century before the incorporation of Finland. Blue and yellow represent the Geats and Swedes tribes; their previous unification marks the consolidation of Sweden (in one commonly held view). Geats Swedes Gutes

The consolidation of Sweden was an extended process during which loosely organized polities of the first millennium AD consolidated under the power of a common king. The age of the first kingdom of Swedes centered around Lake Mälaren is unknown. The first time that the ancient Swedes and the neighbouring Götar polity around Lake Vättern are documented to have shared a ruler is with the election of Olof Skötkonung about AD 1000.

Scholars differ in defining early Sweden as either a country, state or kingdom. The Swedish name of Sweden is Sverige, which stems from an older form akin to Svea rike, "Country of the Swedes", which is still used poetically. It is found earliest in the Beowolf saga (Old English: Swēorīċe), recorded in the Nowell Codex in Old English around 1000, but linguistically traced to the 9th or 8th century.

== Older sources ==
Based on the origins of the name of the kingdom as meaning (Kingdom of the Swedes), some historians have argued that Sweden was unified when the Swedes first solidified their control over the regions they were living in. The earliest date for this is based on a brief section in the Roman historian Tacitus discussing the Suiones tribe. This would imply that a Swedish kingdom would have existed in the first to second centuries AD. However, with the increased rigour of historical method advanced in 20th century historical research, in Sweden as elsewhere, historians such as Curt Weibull and his brother Lauritz maintained that these perspectives have become obsolete. Modern historians noted that a millennium had passed between Tacitus and more in-depth and reliable documented accounts (or notices of contemporary events relating to Sweden by Frankish and German writers) of Swedish history. The work of Birger Nerman (1925), who argued that Sweden held a senior rank among the existing European states at the time represents a nationalist reaction to the academic historiography, with the latter taking a critical or cautious view of the value of old layers of sources of history especially if these documents and traditions are unsupported by any direct traces, any footprint of events and social or political conditions in the archaeological records, buildings, coinage etc. of the age in question.

== Geats-Swedes arguments ==
The names Swedes and Geats are attested in the Old English poems Beowulf (written down in the 11th century) and Widsith (from the 8th century) and building on older legendary and folklore material collected in England. In both poems, an Ongentheow (corresponding to Angantyr in Icelandic sagas) is named as the King of the Swedes, and the Geats are mentioned as a separate people. These names of peoples living in present-day Sweden, the Anglo-Saxon references and now lost tales they were attached to must have travelled across the North Sea. The first time the two peoples are documented to have had a common ruler is during the reign of Olof Skötkonung about AD 1000.

== Timeframe arguments ==
Rather than the unification of tribes under one king, others maintain that the process of consolidation was gradual. Nineteenth-century scholars saw the unification as a result of a series of wars based on evidence from the Norse sagas. For example, according to the Norwegian Historia Norwegiae and the Icelandic historian Snorri Sturlusson, a 7th-century king called Ingjald illråde burnt a number of subordinate kings to death inside his hall, thus abolishing the petty kingdoms in the consolidation of Sweden.

According to Sverre Bagge, unification in Sweden centered on controlling the areas around the major lakes in Sweden.

== See also ==
- Sweden proper
- History of Scandinavia
- Early Swedish history
- Götaland theory
