= Jan Guillou =

French-Swedish author and journalist

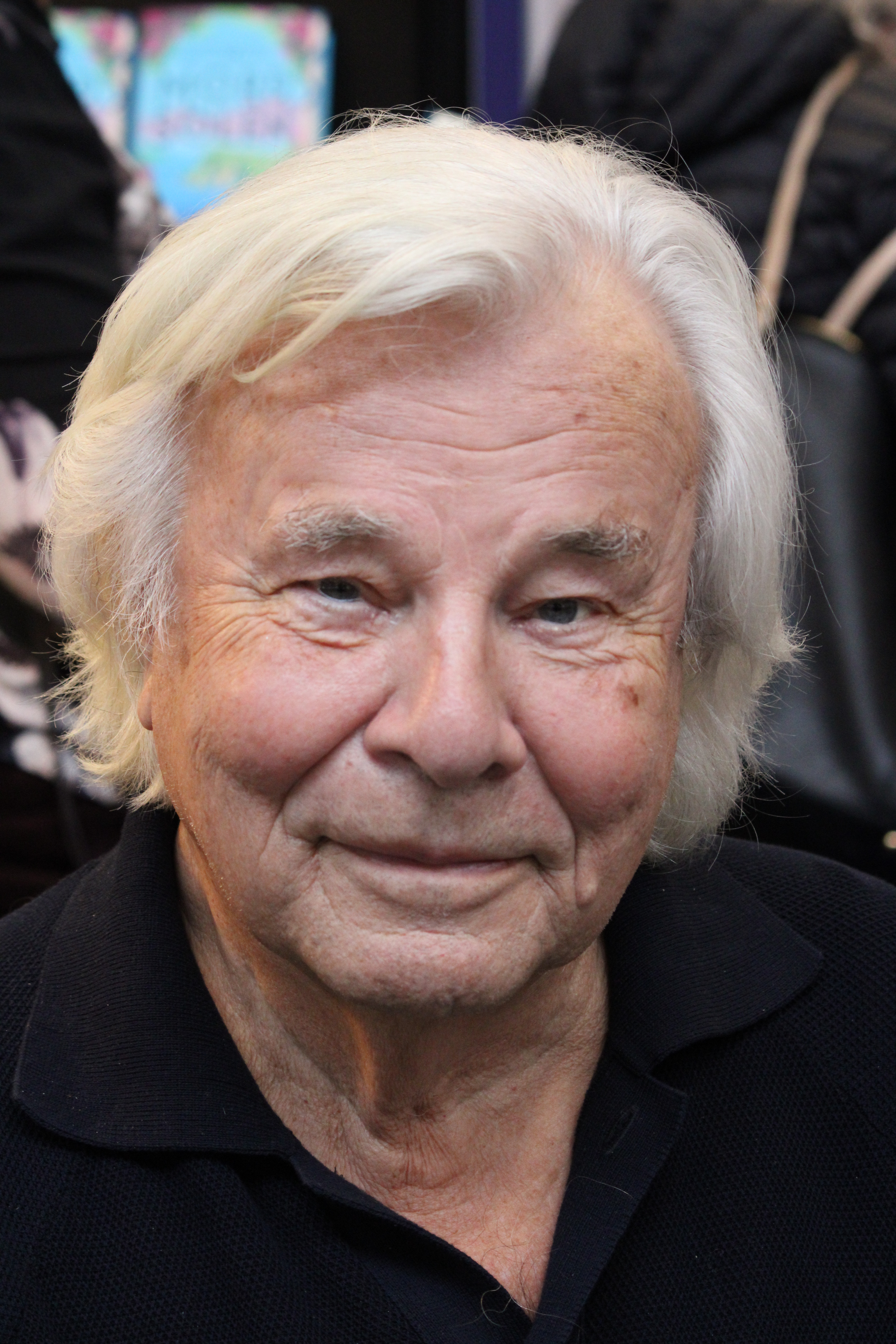
- Guillou in 2025
- Born: Jan Oskar Sverre Lucien Henri Guillou; 17 January 1944 (age 82); Södertälje, Sweden
- Occupations: Author, journalist
- Writing career
- Genres: Spy fiction, historical fiction, political thriller

Jan Oskar Sverre Lucien Henri Guillou (Swedish pronunciation: [ˈjɑːn ɡɪˈjuː], French: [ɡiju]; born 17 January 1944) is a French-Swedish author, journalist and convicted spy. Guillou has been accused by some commentators of being an agent of the KGB. Guillou's fame in Sweden was established during his time as an investigative journalist, most notably in 1973 when he and co-reporter Peter Bratt exposed a secret, immoral and illegal intelligence organization in Sweden, Informationsbyrån (IB). He is still active within journalism as a column writer for the Swedish evening tabloid Aftonbladet. Among his books are a series of spy fiction novels about a spy named Carl Hamilton, and a trilogy of historical fiction novels about a Knight Templar, Arn Magnusson. He is the owner of one of the largest publishing companies in Sweden, Piratförlaget (Pirate Publishing), together with his wife, publisher Ann-Marie Skarp, and Liza Marklund.

== Life and career ==
Guillou was born in Södertälje, Stockholm County, Sweden. His Breton-Swedish father, Charles Guillou (1922–2020), came to Sweden in 1941 as the son of a member of the French Resistance and head of the offices of Free France in Stockholm, and later became a journalist for the French nationwide daily newspaper L'Équipe. His mother, Marianne (née Botolfsen; 1922–2013), was of Norwegian descent. Guillou acquired French citizenship at birth and became a Swedish citizen in 1975. When Guillou's paternal grandfather was offered a position at the French embassy in Helsinki, Finland, his father decided to move with him and settled there. Guillou grew up with his mother and her new husband in Saltsjöbaden and Näsbypark outside of Stockholm.

=== Education ===
Guillou studied at Vasa Real in Stockholm but was expelled from the school because of his bad behaviour, including physical abuse, theft and blackmail. He then went on to study for two years at the Solbacka boarding school in Södermanland. Guillou has described his upbringing, with the continuous physical abuse from his sadistic stepfather and the harsh treatment at the Solbacka school, in the semi-autobiographical novel Ondskan (1981). According to the Swedish tabloid newspaper Expressen, his mother, his sister, his teachers and his friends from the Solbacka school have contested his account and called the book a hoax.

He finished his studentexamen (upper-secondary final examination) from the boarding school Viggbyholmsskolan, located in Viggbyholm, in 1964. Guillou then attended Stockholm University from 1964 to 1966.

=== Family ===
Guillou first lived together with author and translator Marina Stagh, with whom he has two children, Dan (born 1970) and Ann-Linn (born 1972) Guillou. His daughter Ann-Linn, a journalist and feminist commentator, lives in a civil union with Sandra Andersson, daughter of film director Roy Andersson.

He is now married to publisher Ann-Marie Skarp (born 1952), the daughter of colonel Åke Skarp and Märta (née Kugelberg). He has an apartment in the Östermalm district of Stockholm, where he has lived for most of his adult life. He also has a country residence in Flybo, Östhammar Municipality, northern Roslagen, where he lives when he writes his books.

=== Employment ===
Guillou started his career as a journalist writing for the magazine FIB aktuellt from 1966 to 1967. He later co-founded the Folket i Bild/Kulturfront magazine, at which he worked from 1972 until 1977. He currently writes a column for Aftonbladet and also comments occasionally in other news outlets on current events usually taking the left-wing and the Anti-American side, particularly the conflicts in the Middle East and miscellaneous domestic issues, including the United States' war on terrorism, Israeli policy towards the Palestinians, the Swedish Security Service, Swedish courtroom procedures and public inquiries.

Guillou has served as the host of several television programmes: Magazinet (1981–1984), Rekordmagazinet (last years together with Göran Skytte) and Grabbarna på Fagerhult (together with Pär Lorentzon and Leif G. W. Persson), all shown on Sveriges Television.

He co-authored the crime/drama television series Talismanen (TV4, 2003). In the series, Guillou and co-author Henning Mankell both play the roles of themselves. Guillou also authored and narrated the history documentary series Arns rike (TV4, 2004) and Häxornas tid (TV4, 2005).

He was awarded the Lenin Award (Sweden) in 2014, and at the prize ceremony Cecilia Cervin said this about him: "You have remained "cheeky", or refractory as Jan Myrdal usually calls it, i.e., disobedient, defiant, resilient, through a long writing life. You have achieved a lot with it and that is why we pay tribute to you today."

== The IB affair ==
In 1973, Folket i Bild/Kulturfront, a left-wing magazine, published a series of articles written by Guillou and Peter Bratt, revealing a Swedish secret intelligence agency called Informationsbyrån ("The Information Bureau" or IB for short). The articles, based on information initially furnished by former IB employee Håkan Isacson, described the IB as a secret organization that gathered information on Swedish communists and others deemed to be "security risks". The organization operated outside of the framework of the defense and ordinary intelligence, and was invisible in terms of state budget allocations. The articles in Folket i Bild/Kulturfront accused the IB staff of being engaged in alleged murder, break-ins, wiretapping against foreign embassies in Sweden and spying abroad.

The exposure of the IB in the magazine, which included headshots with names and social security numbers of some of the alleged staff published under the headline "Spies", led to a major domestic political scandal known as the "IB affair" (IB-affären). The activities ascribed to this secret outfit and its alleged ties to the Swedish Social Democratic Party were denied by Prime Minister Olof Palme, Defense Minister Sven Andersson and the Supreme Commander of the Swedish Armed Forces, General Stig Synnergren. However, later investigations by various journalists and by a public commissions, as well as autobiographies by the persons involved, have confirmed some of the activities described by Bratt and Guillou. In 2002, the public commission published a 3,000-page report where research about the IB affair was included.

Guillou, Peter Bratt and Håkan Isacson were all arrested, tried in camera (behind closed doors) and convicted of espionage. According to Bratt, the verdict required some stretching of established judicial practice on the part of the court since none of them were accused of having acted in collusion with a foreign power. After one appeal Guillou's sentence was reduced from one year to 10 months. Guillou and Bratt served part of their sentence in solitary cells. Guillou was kept first at Långholmen Prison in central Stockholm and later at Österåker Prison north of the capital.

== The CIA affair ==
In 1976, two employees of Sveriges Radio contacted Guillou at Folket i Bild/Kulturfront with a story of a colleague that had been recruited by a CIA officer in Stockholm. They had earlier been turned down by a major newspaper, and now asked the journalist that had exposed IB if he could publish the story. The three worked out a scenario where the CIA recruiter could be legally accused of espionage, and instructed the recruit to collect evidence thereof. Unbelievably enough, the CIA officer agreed to give his spy written instructions of what information to retrieve, so the informal counter-intelligence group had only to stockpile these, take photographs of the two spies meeting, and discuss how much they needed before the final exposure would be made.

The recruited spy was at a later meeting instructed to go to Angola with orders to get information about both military and political conditions. The legally experienced within the group advised their double agent not to agree, but he went anyway. Afterwards, the group assembled to write a false report about the conditions in the civil war-ridden country. Before the three could finalize the entire story for publishing, the spy went to Angola a second time, now with additional tasks on his instruction sheet.

After the spy had returned to Sweden, Guillou in advance placed the article in a major newspaper and with a television news editor. He also contacted the Foreign Department in order to prevent official denials, and discuss the repercussions of the espionage exposure. The published article was a true 'scoop', and the CIA spy handler was ordered to leave Sweden together with a colleague. The spy himself avoided prosecution thanks to the article's portrayal of him as a rather heroic journalist, exposing foreign illegal operations to the public. Afterwards, both he and Guillou were interrogated by the Swedish Security Service, but for assumed political reasons, no criminal charges were made.

== Swedish tabloid accusation ==
During a five-year period starting in 1967, Guillou had a series of meetings with KGB representatives. In October 2009, the Swedish news tabloid Expressen told this story under the headline "Guillou secret agent for Soviet Union". The Swedish security service Säpo at the time knew of the contacts from Guillou's colleague Arne Lemberg, who suspected the activities could be illegal.

According to Guillou, his intention was to expose the KGB espionage journalistically through a scoop based on the activities he was being exposed to and the discussions he had with his KGB contact Jevgenij Gergel. One of the journalists who wrote the articles later commented that he believed Guillou's explanation, "I do not doubt one word of what he has said".

Guillou received payment from KGB for written reports on Swedish politics, and Expressen points to this fact when defending its choice to refer to Guillou as a secret agent. Former KGB Colonel and defector Sergey Tretyakov characterised Guillou as a "classic agent". "Because he accepted money and, worst of all, signed receipts, there's no question about it. The handling of him could be a textbook example at the KGB school in Moscow". Espionage prosecutor Tomas Lindstrand wrote that "agent and spy are not synonymous ideas .... an agent does not have to commit acts of espionage. An agent can perform assignments for his handler without crossing the line to what is prosecutable."

Säpo at the time was skeptical towards Lemberg's report and commented that it found nothing illegal in a newspaper man writing an article based on public information and delivering it to Jevgenij Gergel.

The public Ombudsman of the Swedish Press, Yrsa Stenius, later concluded that Expressen's presentation of facts had been an example of irresponsible journalism. According to her, Expressen had not backed up its frontpage assertion, that "Jan Guillou [was a] Secret Soviet Agent", despite the fact that this had caused "massive" damage to Guillou's reputation. Stenius's conclusion caused controversy, and a number of newspaper leader writers demanded that she resign her post.

On 1 June 2010, the Swedish Press Council [PON] acquitted Expressen of wrongdoing. Expressen denies having claimed that Guillou was guilty of the crime of "espionage", and PON agrees. The frontpage and headline assertions ("Guillou Secret Soviet Agent", "Confesses KGB mission", "Recruited by chief of espionage") according to PON "do not have well defined meanings". PON was also satisfied that the factual details of the story were fully covered in the text of the articles which also included Guillou's own account of the events.

== Political views ==
During the 1960s and early 1970s, Guillou was associated with the Maoist Clarté association. He was also a member of the Communist Party of Sweden (formerly known as the Communist League Marxists-Leninists), a minor Maoist party active mainly during the 1970s, for six months until he was expelled for refusing to pay the monthly member fee while he was living abroad. Today, he no longer considers himself a communist or a Maoist, but describes himself as socialist with a position on the political spectrum "to the left of the Left Party" (a Swedish party formerly known as "The Left Party, the Communists").

=== On the Middle East ===
Guillou is known for his support of the Palestinian people, and he has over the years consistently criticized Israel. In 1976, he wrote, "Zionism is in its foundation racist because the state of Israel is built upon an apartheid system, exactly like South Africa". He has repeatedly taken the stance that Israel is an "apartheid state". In an article published in Svenska Dagbladet in 1977, Guillou wrote, "I'm an optimist, I believe that Israel will cease to exist prior to Armageddon".

The book Irak – det nya Arabien (Iraq – The New Arabia), written by Guillou and his then-wife Marina Stagh, was published in 1977. In the book, which deals with Iraq under the Baath Party before Saddam Hussein's presidency, it is argued that the "European idea of Iraq as a particularly violent country" is simply "a blend of political propaganda and racist fantasies" (p. 91). Guillou and Stagh did the research for the book in 1975 and they assert that, at this time, "the Baath regime is clearly popular and among the most stable in the Arab World" (pp. 168–169), the freedom of the press enjoyed in Iraq was more extensive than in most other countries in the world (p. 239) and it would come as no surprise to the authors if "well before the year 2000, Iraq will have surpassed European countries in living standards" (p. 174).

The conditions at the Abu Ghraib prison, which Guillou claims to have visited as the first Western journalist, are described as excellent and even "better than Swedish prisons" (pp. 249–250). The book was published two years before Saddam Hussein became President of Iraq in 1979. In his 2009 autobiography, Ordets makt och vanmakt (The Power and Powerlessness of the Word), Guillou states that quotes such as the ones cited could be considered true back then. He does however also write that Saddam Hussein, who at the time of publishing was the vice-president under President Ahmed Hassan Al Bakr, was the actual leader of Iraq.

=== On the United States ===
Immediately following the September 11 attacks, Guillou caused controversy when he walked out of the Göteborg Book Fair in the midst of the three minutes of silence observed throughout Europe to honour the victims of the attacks. In an article in Aftonbladet, Guillou argued that the event was an act of hypocrisy, stating that "the U.S. is the great mass murderer of our time. The wars against Vietnam and its nearby countries alone claimed four million lives. Without a minute of silence in Sweden". He also criticised those who said that the attacks were "an attack on us all" by stating that the attacks were only "an attack on U.S. imperialism".

He labeled the media's reaction to the 2006 transatlantic aircraft plot and the measures taken to avoid havoc at the airports unnecessary since the suspects had already been caught. He argued that the media coverage was sensationalist and driven by profit considerations, and that the British government used the occasion to give an impression of success in the war on terrorism. Pointing out that no explosives had been found, he wrote in a column headlined "Don't believe anything written about al-Qaida" that the reactions had resulted in a victimization of the Muslim community.

When the film Evil (2003), an adaption of Guillou's autobiographical novel from 1981, was nominated for an Academy Award in 2003 Guillou was still listed as a terrorist by the US government, because of the IB affair, but managed to get a visa for attending the Academy Award ceremony. However, the film's director Mikael Håfström had given Guillou's ticket to his own wife and Guillou was not able to attend the ceremony.

=== On other issues ===
Ever since the IB affair and the resulting prison sentence for espionage in 1973, Guillou has been a strong critic of the Swedish Security Service. According to Guillou, the Security Service has listed him as a terrorist, which has led to problems with security officials when visiting other countries.

In recent years, Guillou has repeatedly criticised some people and groups within the Swedish radical feminist movement. However, he rejects being called an "antifeminist".

Guillou has also attracted controversy over his views on the history of homosexuality. He has said that "homosexuality is more of a vogue phenomenon than something you're born into. It's something that has come and gone through history" and that "homosexuality didn't exist in the 17th century".

== Books ==
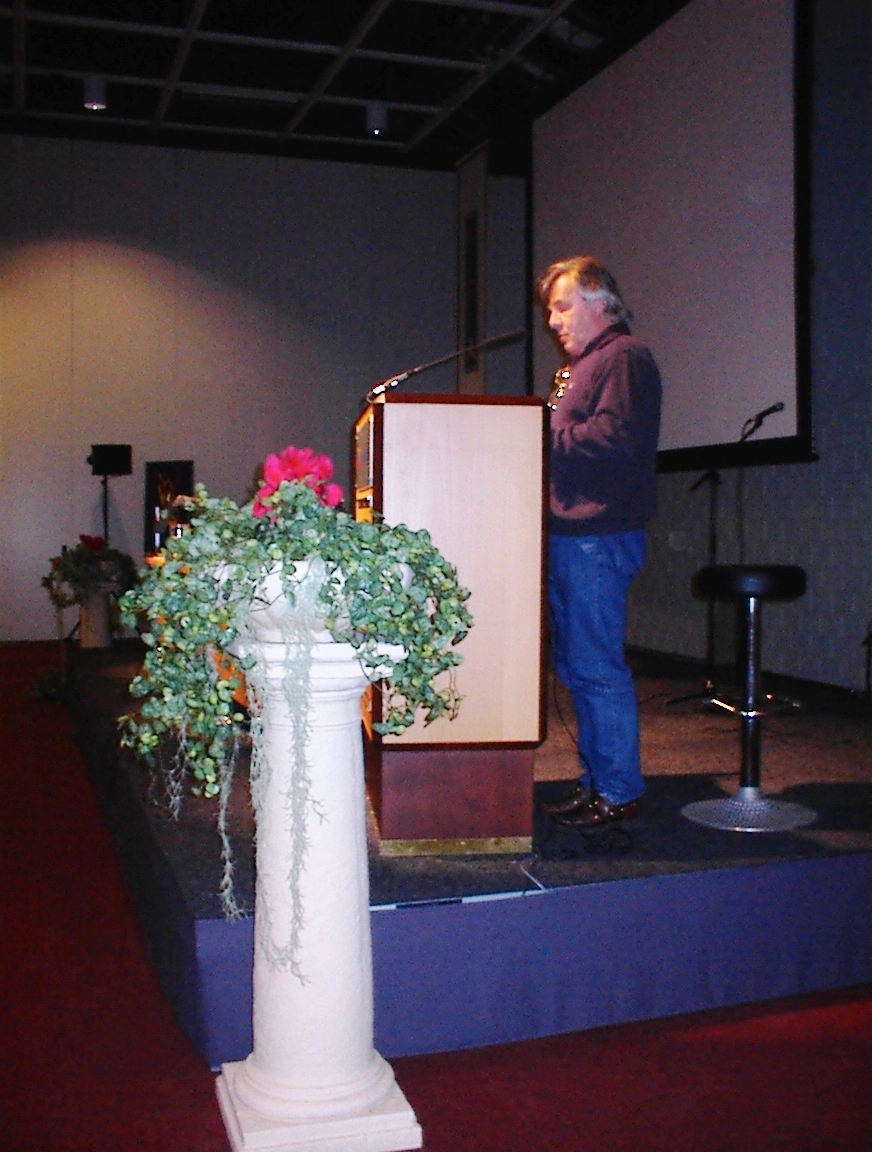
Guillou speaking at Helsinki Book Fair in October 2002

=== Early novels ===
Guillou's first novel Om kriget kommer (If the War Comes) was published in 1971. It's a political spy novel told in the form of a pseudo-documentary about how Sweden in the early 1970s launches a military invasion of South Africa and Rhodesia to overthrow the white apartheid regimes. The main character is the Swedish military spy Karl Aronovitch who prepares the invasion together with African politicians and guerillas.

His second novel, Det stora avslöjandet (The Big Disclosure), was written in prison (see the IB affair) and was published in 1974. The book is intended as a comedy and is a semi-autobiographical novel about a young journalist writing for men's magazines in Stockholm in the early 1970s. The author's alter ego created for the novel is named Erik Ponti, a character that would return in several of his later novels.

His third novel, Ondskan (The Evil), was published in 1981, and is heavily autobiographical in depicting the author's teenage experience of an abusive step-father and a sadistic upperclass boarding school. As in his previous novel, the character Erik Ponti functions as his fictional alter ego. The movie adaption Evil in 2003 was nominated for the Academy Award for Best Foreign Language Film at the 76th Academy Awards and won three Swedish Guldbagge Awards including Best Film.

=== Hamilton ===
In 1986 Guillou published Coq Rouge, the first novel about his fictional Swedish military spy Carl Hamilton. The idea to write a Swedish spy novel had first come to him in prison in 1974 (see the IB affair), but the writing was put on hold until the mid 80's when he was inspired to the plot of the novel when encountering the Norwegian security police in Oslo (an encounter that is featured in the novel where it happens to his alter ego Erik Ponti). The novel became a bestseller and nine more novels about Hamilton followed, with the series ending with its tenth title in 1995.

The main character Carl Hamilton is a Swedish navy officer with Navy SEAL and FBI training, having been secretly recruited by Sweden's military intelligence while doing compulsory military service. The plot follows Hamilton's career as a field operator for Sweden's security police and military intelligence agency, with various missions of investigating murder, infiltrating terrorist groups, rescuing hostages in foreign countries and committing assassinations, with a heavy focus on the world of politics and journalism. Partly because of Hamilton's radical leftist background he receives the codename Coq Rouge, which was used as the title for the original series.

Guillou stated that the tenth novel, En medborgare höjd över varje misstanke (1995), was the last book of the series and that it was impossible for Hamilton to return. However, when he was working on the novel Madame Terror ten years later, he realised that he needed Hamilton to make the plot work. After Hamilton had made his return, he also appears in the novel Men inte om det gäller din dotter.

Film and TV adaptations based on Hamilton

- Codename Coq Rouge, portrayed by Stellan Skarsgård (1989)
- Förhöret, portrayed by Stellan Skarsgård (television film 1989) (English translation: The Interrogation)
- The Democratic Terrorist (TV series), with Humberto López y Guerra (1989)
- Enemy's Enemy, portrayed by Peter Haber (television miniseries 1990)
- The Democratic Terrorist (film), portrayed by Stellan Skarsgård (1992)
- Vendetta, portrayed by Stefan Sauk (movie 1995, extended television miniseries 1996)
- Tribunal, portrayed by Stefan Sauk (television film, 1995)
- Hamilton, portrayed by Peter Stormare (movie 1998, extended television miniseries 2001)
- Hamilton – I nationens intresse, portrayed by Mikael Persbrandt (2012)
- Hamilton – Men inte om det gäller din dotter, portrayed by Mikael Persbrandt (2012)
- Agent Hamilton portrayed by Jakob Oftebro (2020)

The Carl Hamilton who appears in the movies and TV series made between 1989 and 1998 (Stellan Skarsgård, Peter Haber, Stefan Sauk and Peter Stormare) is based on the novels, with minor changes.

The Carl Hamilton who appears in the movies Hamilton – I nationens intresse (2011) and Hamilton – Men inte om det gäller din dotter (2012), played by Mikael Persbrandt, is only loosely based on the character from the novel and does not follow the original story line or setting, and is mostly a new character moved into the 2010s.

The Carl Hamilton who appears in the TV series Hamilton (2020), played by Jakob Oftebro, is entirely different from the original story, both younger and moved to the 2020s.

=== Crusades trilogy ===
After finishing the Hamilton series in 1995, Guillou began writing a medieval trilogy about the Crusades. The intent was to depict the increasing modern day tensions between the Western world and the Arab world, by telling about the previous Holy War between Christianity and Islam. The main character of the trilogy is Arn Magnusson, a fictional Swedish nobleman in the 12th century who is forced to become a Knight Templar in Palestine during the Crusades. Arn becomes a witness as well as a catalyst to many important historical events, both in his homeland of Västra Götaland and in the Holy Land. Apart from depicting the Crusades, the novels also depict the early formation of Sweden.

The Crusades Trilogy consists of the following novels:

- The Road to Jerusalem, original Swedish title Vägen till Jerusalem (1998)
- The Knight Templar, original Swedish title Tempelriddaren (1999), ISBN 0-7528-4650-7
- The Kingdom at the End of the Road, original Swedish title Riket vid vägens slut (2000)

As a follow-up to the trilogy Guillou also wrote a fourth medieval novel entitled The Heritage of Arn, original Swedish title Arvet efter Arn (2001) about Birger Jarl, a mighty ruler during the formation of Sweden and supposed founder of Stockholm. In Guillou's fictional universe, Birger Jarl is the grandson of Arn Magnusson.

=== The war on terror ===
In 2004 Guillou returned to contemporary crime novels meant to depict the world of Western politics and law in the wake of 9/11 and the war on terror, mainly focusing on the new character Eva Johnsén-Tanguy, a high ranking police officer who comes to work within the Swedish security service. She is introduced in Tjuvarnas marknad ("Market of Thieves") in 2004, and her story continues in Fienden inom oss ("The Enemy Within Us") in 2007 and Men inte om det gäller din dotter ("But Not If It Concerns Your Daughter") in 2008, a novel which also saw the return of Carl Hamilton.

=== The Great Century ===
In 2011 Guillou published the first part of a new series meant to depict the 20th century, from 1901 to 2001. In his own words the project is to be his last, and also his biggest and his best, telling the story of humanity's greatest, bloodiest and most cruel century. The series follows the family Lauritzen, starting in the late 19th century when three brothers from a poor fishing village in Norway are sent to Dresden in Germany to become engineers. The series then continue with their descendants through the 20th century, and each novel is meant to cover one decade. The plot includes ambitious engineering projects in Scandinavia and Africa, colonialism, communities of artists, underground resistance and espionage during the world wars, the nuclear threat, the impact of American culture on Sweden, the leftist movement in the '60s and '70s, Vietnam protests, economy and politics and law. The first three novels are mainly set in Norway, Germany, Eastern Africa and Britain, while the setting moves to Sweden with the fourth novel.

- Brobyggarna ("The Bridge Builders") (2011)
- Dandy (2012)
- Mellan rött och svart ("Between Red and Black") (2013)
- Att inte vilja se ("Not Wanting to See") (2014)
- Blå stjärnan ("The Blue Star") (2015)
- Äkta amerikanska jeans ("Real American Jeans") (2016)
- 1968 (2017)
- De som dödar drömmar sover aldrig ("Those Who Kill Dreams Never Sleep") (2018)
- Den andra dödssynden ("The Second Deadly Sin") (2019)
- Slutet på historien ("The End of the Story") (2020)

=== Carl Hamilton and Erik Ponti ===
These novels are written in the first person with Erik Ponti as the narrator. They include incidents taken from Guillou's own recent life.

- Den som dödade helvetets änglar (2022)
- Eventuellt uppsåt – att döda ortens gangsters (2023)
- Anteckningar från aftonsången (2024)
- Inte krig och inte fred (2025)

== Awards and honours ==
- 1984 – Stora Journalistpriset ("Great Journalist Award"), for his writings in the Keith Cederholm-case
- 1984 – Aftonbladets TV-pris ("Aftonbladet TV Award"), in the category "Male Television Person of the Year"
- 1988 – Bästa svenska kriminalroman ("Best Swedish Crime Novel") from the Swedish Academy of Crime Writers, for I nationens intresse
- 1990 – Prix France Culture ("France Culture Award") from France Culture, for Ondskan (awarded as best novel translated into French)
- 1998 – Årets författare ("Author of the Year") from the Swedish Union of Local Government Officers
- 2000 – Årets bok ("Book of the Year") from Månadens Bok, for Riket vid vägens slut
- 2014 – The Lenin Award

Guillou was also chairman of the Swedish Publicists' Association (Publicistklubben) from 2000 to 2004.
