= Arnold of Torroja =

Grand Master of the Knights Templar

- Arnau de Torroja
- Arnold of Torroja's coat of arms

9th Grand Master of the Knights Templar
- In office 1181–1184
- Preceded by: Odo of St Amand
- Succeeded by: Gerard de Ridefort

Personal details
- Born: Solsona
- Died: 30 September 1184 Verona, Italy

Arnold of Torroja (Catalan: Arnau de Torroja; ? – 30 September 1184) was a knight of Crown of Aragon and the ninth Grand Master of the Knights Templar from 1181 until his death in 1184.

== Personal life ==
While no date of birth survives for Torroja; he was very old at his death, being in excess of 70 years when he was elected as Grand Master. He had served in the order for many years and was the Templar Master in both Crown of Aragon and Provence.

== Military record ==
=== Reconquista ===
Torroja's military career had mainly been focused on the Reconquista, fighting Muslims for the Crown of Aragon and for Portugal but was principally active in Catalonia and Aragon. His appointment as Grand Master was likely due to his image as an outsider i.e. an experienced Templar whose power base was outside the Holy Land. This appealed to the order as the previous Grand Master Odo de St Amand had become embroiled in Jerusalem's politics but it did mean that Torroja was inexperienced in the "political situation of the Latin States". He became the order's new leader in 1181.

=== Conflict with the Hospitallers ===
During the Grand Master's reign the Knights Hospitaller reached a new peak in their influence. There had been rivalry between orders previously but factionalism in the face of renewed Muslim pressure was unacceptable. The two Grand Masters met for mediation with Pope Lucius III and King Baldwin IV and the problems were resolved. In fact Torroja is recorded as a skilled diplomat himself acting as a mediator between several political groups in the East. He also conducted successful peace negotiations with Saladin after raids by Raynald of Châtillon in Transjordan.

=== Embassy to Europe ===
In 1184, Torroja set out with Patriarch Heraclius and Grand Master Roger de Moulins of the Knights Hospitaller to gather European support for the Kingdom of Jerusalem. They planned to visit Italy, England and France, but he fell ill and died at Verona on September 30, 1184. He was succeeded as Grand Master by Gérard de Ridefort.

=== Tomb ===
In February 2018 was announced the discovery of a tomb in the San Fermo Maggiore church in Verona, which almost certainly is Arnold's final resting place. The tomb contained a stone sarcophagus with a cross pattée carved on it, itself containing a human body, and several analysis conducted by researchers of the Universities of Verona, Bologna and Nottingham together would confirm the identity of the deceased; it would be the first known tomb of a Templar Grand Master.

From preliminary analysis, the remains are those of a man in his fifties who lived around seven centuries ago, and who suffered from back pain and toothache. Along with the bones, remains of a dress of fine silk datable to the 12th century, as well as what looks like a shroud, further support the identification. The DNA from the bones will be compared with that of Arnold's brother, the then archbishop of Tarragona, Guillem de Torroja.

Religious titles
Preceded by Odo de St Amand	Grand Master of the Knights Templar; 1179–1184	Succeeded by Gérard de Ridefort
