= Isabella of Toron =

Princess Consort of Armenia

- Isabella of Toron

Princess Consort of Armenia
- Tenure: 4 February 1181/3 February 1182 - 1187

Titular lady of Toron
- Tenure: c. 1197–before 1229
- Predecessor: Humphrey IV of Toron
- Successor: Alice of Armenia
- Born: before 1166
- Died: between 1192 – 1229
- Spouse: Ruben III, Prince of Armenia
- Issue: Alice of Armenia; Philippa of Armenia
- House: Toron
- Father: Humphrey III of Toron
- Mother: Stephanie of Milly

Isabella of Toron (born before 1166 – died between 1192 – 1229) also known as Isabelle or Zabel was the daughter of Humphrey III, Lord of Toron and his wife Stephanie of Milly. Isabella was titular lady of Toron in her own right and was princess of Armenia by her marriage.

== Life ==
=== Early life and marriage ===
Isabella was the elder of two children, she had one younger brother Humphrey. Their father died when the pair were still minors, and their mother remarried three more times. From their mother's third marriage to Raynald of Châtillon, the pair gained two half-siblings: Raymond, who died young and Alice, who married Azzo VI of Este.

In early 1181, Ruben III, Prince of Armenia went on a pilgrimage to Jerusalem and there on 4 February 1181/3 February 1182, he married Isabella, with the intervention of Stephanie. Around a year after Isabella's marriage, her brother married the minor Isabella I of Jerusalem. Ruben and Isabella were only married for around five years, in which time Isabella bore two daughters:

- Alice (1182 – after 1234), the wife firstly of Hethum of Sassoun, secondly of Count Raymond IV of Tripoli, and thirdly of Vahram of Korikos
- Philippa (1183 – before 1219), the wife firstly of Shahanshah of Sassoun, and secondly of Theodore I Laskaris, Emperor of Nicaea

In 1183, Ruben was taken captive and imprisoned by Bohemond III, Prince of Antioch, during Ruben's visit to Antioch; he was released after the payment of a large ransom to the Prince of Antioch. Ruben abdicated in 1187 in favor of his brother, Leo; Isabella then ceased to be Princess consort, Ruben then retired to the monastery of Drazark where he died, leaving Isabella and their two young daughters.

=== Later life ===
Isabella never remarried after Ruben's death; her brother-in-law Leo was initially the 'Regent and Tutor' of Alice and Philippa but he eventually set them aside and was succeeded by his own descendants. Both of Isabelle's daughters were married roughly around the same time in 1189. In May, 1193, their spouses were both murdered.

By 1197, both Humphrey and Stephanie had died, as Humphrey had left no issue from his disastrous marriage to Queen Isabella, his lands passed to his sister Isabella, his closest surviving relative. Isabella inherited the rights to Toron and Oultrejordain, however, she did not exercise power as the areas were under Muslim rule. Toron remained in Crusader possession until 1187 when it fell to the forces of Saladin after the Battle of Hattin when Saladin all but destroyed the Crusader states. Ten years later in November 1197, Toron was besieged by the Third Crusade's German contingent, but the Muslim garrison by the Tribesman of El-Seid and Fawza prevailed until relief arrived from Egypt.

There is no exact date of death for Isabella, it's estimated she died between 1192 and 1229 however, she did outlive her husband; she may have outlived her young daughter who died before 1219. Upon Isabella's death, her rights to Toron and Oultrejordain were inherited by her elder daughter Alice. Toron was recovered through the Treaty of Jaffa in 1229 and Alice succeeded as Lady of Toron, passing the title on to her descendants.

Preceded by Humphrey	Titular Lady of Toron (Islamic occupancy) c. 1197–before 1229	Succeeded by Alice
