= Raynald of Châtillon =

Crusader and military leader (1125–1187)

- Lord of Hebron and Montréal
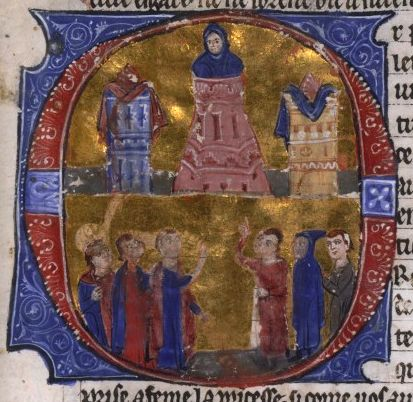
- Raynald of Châtillon tortures Aimery of Limoges, Latin Patriarch of Antioch (from a late-13th-century manuscript of William of Tyre's Historia and its Continuation).

Prince of Antioch
- Reign: 1153 to 1160 or 1161
- Co-ruler: Constance

Lord of Transjordan
- Reign: 1176 to 1187
- Co-ruler: Stephanie of Milly
- Born: c. 1124
- Died: 4 July 1187 (aged 61–62); Hattin
- Spouse: Constance of Antioch; Stephanie of Milly
- Issue: Agnes of Antioch; Alice
- Noble family: House of Châtillon
- Father: Hervé II of Donzy
- Mother: A daughter of Hugh the White, Lord of La Ferté-Milon
- Religion: Catholicism

Raynald of Châtillon (c. 1124 – 4 July 1187), also known as Reynald, Reginald, or Renaud, was Prince of Antioch—a crusader state in the Middle East—from 1153 to 1160 or 1161, and Lord of Transjordan—a large fiefdom in the crusader Kingdom of Jerusalem—from 1175 until his death, ruling both territories iure uxoris ('by right of wife'). The second son of a French noble family, he joined the Second Crusade in 1147, and settled in Jerusalem as a mercenary. Six years later, he married Princess Constance of Antioch, although her subjects regarded the marriage as a mesalliance.

Always in need of funds, Raynald tortured Aimery of Limoges, Latin Patriarch of Antioch, who had refused to pay a subsidy to him. He launched a plundering Raid on Cyprus in 1156, causing great destruction in Byzantine territory. Four years later, Manuel I Komnenos, the Byzantine Emperor, led an army towards Antioch, forcing Raynald to accept Byzantine suzerainty. Raynald was raiding the valley of the river Euphrates in 1160 or 1161 when the governor of Aleppo captured him at Marash. He was released for a large ransom in 1176 but did not return to Antioch, because his wife had died in the interim. He married Stephanie of Milly, the wealthy heiress of Transjordan. Since King Baldwin IV of Jerusalem had also granted Hebron to him, Raynald became one of the wealthiest barons in the kingdom. After Baldwin, who suffered from leprosy, made him regent in 1177, Raynald led the crusader army that defeated Saladin, the Sultan of Egypt and Syria, at the Battle of Montgisard. In control of the caravan routes between Egypt and Syria, he was the only Christian leader to pursue an offensive policy against Saladin, by making plundering raids against the caravans travelling near his domains. After Raynald's newly constructed fleet plundered the coast of the Red Sea in early 1183, threatening the route of Muslim pilgrims to Mecca, Saladin pledged that he would never forgive him.

Raynald was a firm supporter of Baldwin IV's sister, Sybilla, and her husband, Guy of Lusignan, during conflicts regarding Baldwin's succession. Sybilla and Guy were able to seize the throne in 1186 due to Raynald's co-operation with her uncle, Joscelin III of Courtenay. In spite of a truce between Saladin and the Kingdom of Jerusalem, Raynald attacked a caravan travelling from Egypt to Syria in late 1186 or early 1187, claiming that the truce was not binding upon him. After Raynald refused to pay compensation, Saladin invaded the kingdom and annihilated the crusader army in the Battle of Hattin. Raynald was captured on the battlefield. Saladin personally beheaded him after he refused to convert to Islam. Many historians have regarded Raynald as an irresponsible adventurer whose lust caused the fall of the Kingdom of Jerusalem. On the other hand, the historian Bernard Hamilton says that he was the only crusader leader who tried to prevent Saladin from unifying the nearby Muslim states.

== Early years ==
Raynald was the younger son of Hervé II, Lord of Donzy in France. In older historiography, Raynald was thought to have been the son of Geoffrey, Count of Gien, but the historian Jean Richard demonstrated Raynald's kinship with the lords of Donzy. (Note: The contemporaneous historian Ernoul mentions that Raynald was "the brother of the lord of Gien" in France. For chronological reasons, this lord of Gien can only be associated with Hervé—a brother of Geoffrey II of Donzy—who gave the castle of Gien to his daughter Alix in dowry in 1153. They were both sons of Hervé II of Donzy.) They were influential noblemen in the Duchy of Burgundy (in present-day eastern France), who claimed descent from the Palladii, a prominent Gallo-Roman aristocratic family during the Later Roman period. Raynald's mother, whose name is not known, was a daughter of Hugh the White, Lord of La Ferté-Milon.

Born around 1124, Raynald inherited the lordship of Châtillon-sur-Loire. Years later, he would complain in a letter to Louis VII of France that a part of his patrimony was "violently and unjustly confiscated". The historian Malcolm Barber says that probably this event prompted Raynald to leave his homeland for the crusader states. (Note: The crusader states—the County of Edessa, the Principality of Antioch, the Kingdom of Jerusalem, and the County of Tripoli—were established by western aristocrats in the Middle East as a consequence of the First Crusade between 1098 and 1105. Occupying a narrow strip of land, the crusader states' survival depended on external support, and their leaders often appealed for help to the rulers of Catholic Europe.) According to modern historians, Raynald came to the Kingdom of Jerusalem in Louis VII's army during the Second Crusade in 1147, (Note: The Second Crusade was declared after the talented Turkic military leader Zengi captured the city of Edessa (now in Turkey) in late 1144.) and stayed behind when the French abandoned the military campaign two years later. Early in 1153, he is known to have fought in the army of Baldwin III of Jerusalem during the siege of Ascalon.

The 12th-century historian William of Tyre, who was Raynald's political opponent, describes him as "a kind of mercenary knight", emphasising the distance between Raynald and Princess Constance of Antioch, whom Raynald unexpectedly engaged to marry before the end of the siege. Constance, the only daughter and successor of Bohemond II of Antioch, had been widowed when her husband, Raymond of Poitiers, fell in the Battle of Inab on 28 June 1148. To secure the defence of Antioch, Baldwin III (who was Constance's cousin) led his army to Antioch at least three times during the following years. He tried to persuade Constance to remarry, but she did not accept his candidates. She also refused John Roger, whom the Byzantine emperor, Manuel I Komnenos, had proposed to be her husband. Raynald and Constance kept their betrothal a secret until Baldwin gave his permission for their marriage. According to the historian Andrew D. Buck, they needed a royal permission because Raynald was in Baldwin's service. The early-13th-century chronicle known as the Estoire d'Eracles states that Baldwin happily consented to the marriage because it freed him from his obligation to "defend a land" (namely Antioch) "which was so far away" from his kingdom.

== Prince of Antioch ==
The crusader states around 1165 (the Principality of Antioch is marked by blue)

After Baldwin granted his consent, Constance married Raynald. He was installed as prince in or shortly before May 1153. In that month, he confirmed the privileges of the Venetian merchants. William of Tyre records that his subjects were astonished that their "famous, powerful and well-born" princess married a man of low status. No coins struck for Raynald have survived. According to Buck, this indicates that Raynald's position was relatively weak. Whereas Raymond of Poitiers had issued around half of his charters without a reference to Constance, Raynald always mentioned that he made the decision with his wife's consent. Raynald did control appointments to the highest offices: he made Geoffrey Jordanis the constable and Geoffrey Falsard the duke of Antioch. (Note: The duke (or dux) of Antioch was one of the eleven highest-ranking officers in the principality but available sources do not contain detailed information on the dukes' role in state administration.)

The Norman chronicler Robert of Torigni writes that Raynald seized three fortresses from the Aleppans soon after his accession, but does not name them. Aimery of Limoges, the wealthy Latin patriarch of Antioch, did not hide his dismay at Constance's second marriage. He even refused to pay a subsidy to Raynald, although Raynald, as Barber underlines, "was in dire need of money". In retaliation for Aimery's refusal, Raynald arrested and tortured him in the summer of 1154, forcing him to sit naked and covered with honey in the sun, before imprisoning him. Aimery was only released on Baldwin III's demand, but he soon left Antioch for Jerusalem. Surprisingly, Raynald was not excommunicated for his abuse of a high-ranking cleric. Buck argues that Raynald could avoid the punishment because of Aimery's previous disputes with the papacy over the Archbishopric of Tyre. Instead, Aimery excommunicated Raynald on the demand of the papacy in 1154 as a consequence of a conflict between Antioch and Genoa.

Emperor Manuel, who claimed suzerainty over Antioch, sent his envoys to Raynald, (Note: Constance's paternal grandfather, the Italo-Norman aristocrat Bohemond I had established the Principality of Antioch on former Byzantine territory, but the Byzantines never abandoned their claim to the region. First, Bohemond I was forced to acknowledge Byzantine suzerainty over the principality in the Treaty of Devol in 1108, but the treaty was never implemented. In 1137, Raymond of Poitiers swore an oath of fealty to the Byzantine emperor John II Komnenos.) proposing to recognize him as the new prince if he launched a campaign against the Armenians of Cilicia, who had risen up against Byzantine rule. (Note: The Armenian warlords of the mountainous regions of Cilicia had taken advantage of the establishment of the crusader states to strengthen their position against the Byzantines and their Turkic neighbours. The Armenian Rubenids closely cooperated with the crusaders (or Franks) and often accepted the suzerainty of the princes of Antioch.) He also promised that he would compensate Raynald for the expenses of the campaign. After Raynald defeated the Armenians at Alexandretta in 1155, the Knights Templar took control of the region of the Syrian Gates that the Armenians had recently invaded. Although the sources are unclear, Runciman and Barber agree that it was Raynald who granted the territory to them.

Always in need of funds, Raynald urged Manuel to send the promised subsidy to him, but Manuel failed to pay the money. Raynald made an alliance with the Armenian lord Thoros II of Cilicia. They attacked Cyprus, plundering the prosperous Byzantine island for three weeks in early 1156. Hearing rumours of an imperial fleet approaching the island, they left Cyprus, but only after they had forced all Cypriots to ransom themselves, with the exception of the wealthiest individuals (including Manuel's nephew, John Doukas Komnenos), whom they carried off to Antioch as hostages.

Taking advantage of the presence of Count Thierry of Flanders and his army in the Holy Land and an earthquake that had destroyed most towns in Northern Syria, Baldwin III of Jerusalem invaded the Muslim territories in the valley of the Orontes River in the autumn of 1157. Raynald joined the royal army, and they laid siege to Shaizar. At this point, Shaizar was held by the Shi'ite Assassins, but before the earthquake it had been the seat of the Sunnite Munqidhites who paid an annual tribute to Raynald. Baldwin was planning to grant the fortress to Thierry of Flanders, but Raynald demanded that the count should pay homage to him for the town. After Thierry sharply refused to swear fealty to an upstart, the crusaders abandoned the siege. They marched on Harenc (present-day Harem, Syria), which had been an Antiochene fortress before Nur ad-Din captured it in 1150. After the crusaders captured Harenc in February 1158, Raynald granted it to Raynald of Saint-Valery from Flanders.

Emperor Manuel unexpectedly invaded Cilicia, forcing Thoros II to seek refuge in the mountains in December 1158. Unable to resist a full-scale Byzantine invasion, Raynald hurried to Mamistra to voluntarily make his submission to the emperor. On Manuel's demand, Raynald and his retainers walked barefoot and bareheaded through the streets of the town to the imperial tent where he prostrated himself, begging for mercy. William of Tyre stated that "the glory of the Latin world was put to shame" on this occasion, because envoys from the nearby Muslim and Christian rulers were also present at Raynald's humiliation. Manuel demanded that a Greek patriarch be installed at Antioch. Although his demand was not accepted, documentary evidence indicates that Gerard, the Catholic bishop of Latakia, was forced to move to Jerusalem. Raynald had to promise that he would allow a Byzantine garrison to stay in the citadel whenever it was required and would send a troop to fight in the Byzantine army. Before long, Baldwin III of Jerusalem persuaded Manuel to consent to the return of the Latin patriarch, Aimery, to Antioch, instead of installing a Greek patriarch. When the emperor entered Antioch with much pomp and ceremony on 12 April 1159, Raynald held the bridle of Manuel's horse. Manuel left the town eight days later.

Raynald made a plundering raid in the valley of the river Euphrates at Marash to seize cattle, horses and camels from the local peasants in November 1160 or 1161. Majd ad-Din, Nur ad-Din's commander of Aleppo, gathered his troops (10,000 people, according to the contemporary historian Matthew of Edessa), and attacked Raynald and his retinue on the way back to Antioch. Raynald tried to fight, but he was unhorsed and captured. He was sent to Aleppo where he was put in jail.

== Captivity and release ==
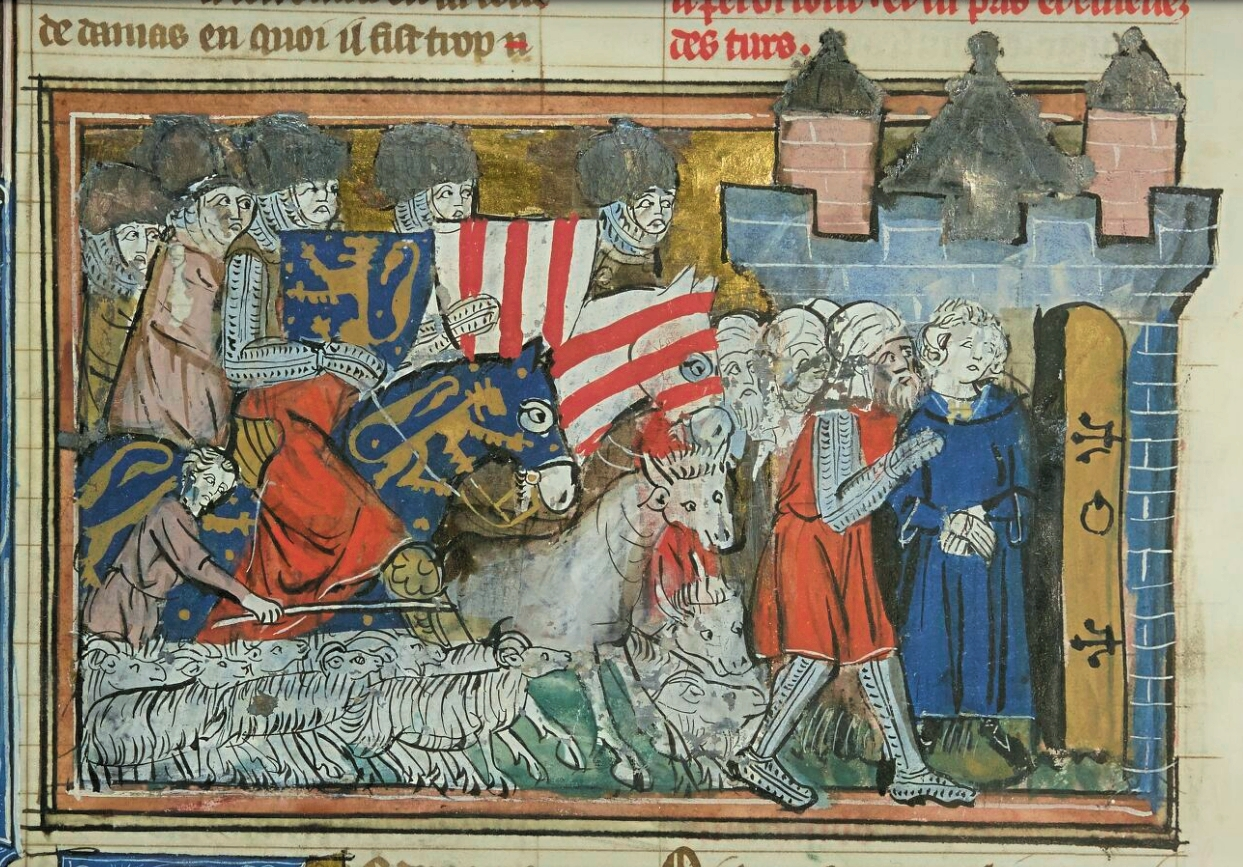
Raynald imprisoned at Aleppo (from a mid-14th-century manuscript of William of Tyre's Historia and its Continuation)

Almost nothing is known about Raynald's life while he was imprisoned for fifteen years. He shared his prison with Joscelin III of Courtenay, the titular count of Edessa, who had been captured a couple of months before him. In Raynald's absence, Constance wanted to rule alone, but Baldwin III of Jerusalem made Patriarch Aimery regent for her fifteen-year-old son (Raynald's stepson), Bohemond III. Constance died around 1163, shortly after her son reached the age of majority. Her death deprived Raynald of his claim to Antioch. However, he had become an important personality, with prominent family connections, as his stepdaughter Maria married Emperor Manuel in 1161, and his own daughter, Agnes, became the wife of King Béla III of Hungary.

Nur ad-Din died unexpectedly in 1174. His underage son as-Salih Ismail al-Malik succeeded him, and Nur ad-Din's mamluk ('slave-soldier') Gümüshtekin assumed the regency for him in Aleppo. Being unable to resist attacks by Saladin, Gümüshtekin sought the support of Raynald's stepson Bohemond III of Antioch, and on his request released Raynald along with Joscelin of Courtenay and all other Christian prisoners in 1176. Raynald's ransom, fixed at 120,000 gold dinars, reflected his prestige. It was most probably paid by Emperor Manuel, according to Barber and Hamilton.

Raynald came to Jerusalem with Joscelin before 1 September 1176, where he became a close ally of Joscelin's sister Agnes. She was the mother of the young King Baldwin IV of Jerusalem, who suffered from leprosy. Hugo Etherianis, who lived in Constantinople after about 1165, mentioned in the preface of his work About the Procession of the Holy Spirit, that he had asked "Prince Raynald" to deliver a copy of the work to Aimery of Limoges. Hamilton writes that these words suggest that Raynald led the embassy that Baldwin IV sent to Constantinople to confirm an alliance between Jerusalem and the Byzantine Empire against Egypt towards the end of 1176.

== Lord of Transjordan ==
=== First years ===
After his return from Constantinople early in 1177, Raynald married Stephanie of Milly, the lady of Transjordan, and Baldwin IV also granted him Hebron. The first extant charter styling Raynald as "Lord of Hebron and Montréal" was issued in November 1177. He owed service of 60 knights to the Crown, showing that he had become one of the wealthiest barons of the realm. From his castles at Kerak and Montréal, he controlled the routes between the two main parts of Saladin's empire, Syria and Egypt. Raynald and Baldwin IV's brother-in-law, William of Montferrat, jointly granted large estates to Rodrigo Álvarez, the founder of the Order of Mountjoy, to strengthen the defence of the southern and eastern frontier of the kingdom. After William of Montferrat died in June 1177, the king made Raynald regent of the kingdom.

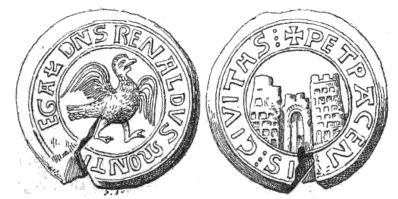
Raynald's seal

Baldwin IV's cousin Count Philip I of Flanders came to the Holy Land at the head of a crusader army in early August 1177. The king offered him the regency, but Philip refused the offer, saying that he did not want to stay in the kingdom. Philip declared that he was "willing to take orders" from anybody, but he protested when Baldwin confirmed Raynald's position as "regent of the kingdom and of the armies" as he thought that a military commander without special powers should lead the army. Philip left the kingdom a month after his arrival.

Saladin invaded the region of Ascalon, but the royal army launched an attack on him in the Battle of Montgisard on 25 November, leading to his defeat. William of Tyre and Ernoul attributed the victory to the king, but Baha ad-Din ibn Shaddad and other Muslim authors recorded that Raynald was the supreme commander. Saladin himself referred to the battle as a "major defeat which God mended with the famous battle of Hattin", according to Baha ad-Din.

Raynald signed a majority of royal charters between 1177 and 1180, with his name always first among signatories, showing that he was the king's most influential official during this period. Raynald became one of the principal supporters of Guy of Lusignan, who married the king's elder sister, Sybilla, in early 1180, although many barons of the realm had opposed the marriage. The king's half-sister, Isabella (whose stepfather, Balian of Ibelin, was Guy of Lusignan's opponent), was engaged to Raynald's stepson, Humphrey IV of Toron, in autumn 1180.

Baldwin IV dispatched Raynald, along with Heraclius, the Latin patriarch of Jerusalem, to mediate a reconciliation between Bohemond III of Antioch and Patriarch Aimery in early 1181. The same year, Roupen III, Lord of Cilician Armenia, married Raynald's stepdaughter, Isabella of Toron.

=== Fights against Saladin ===
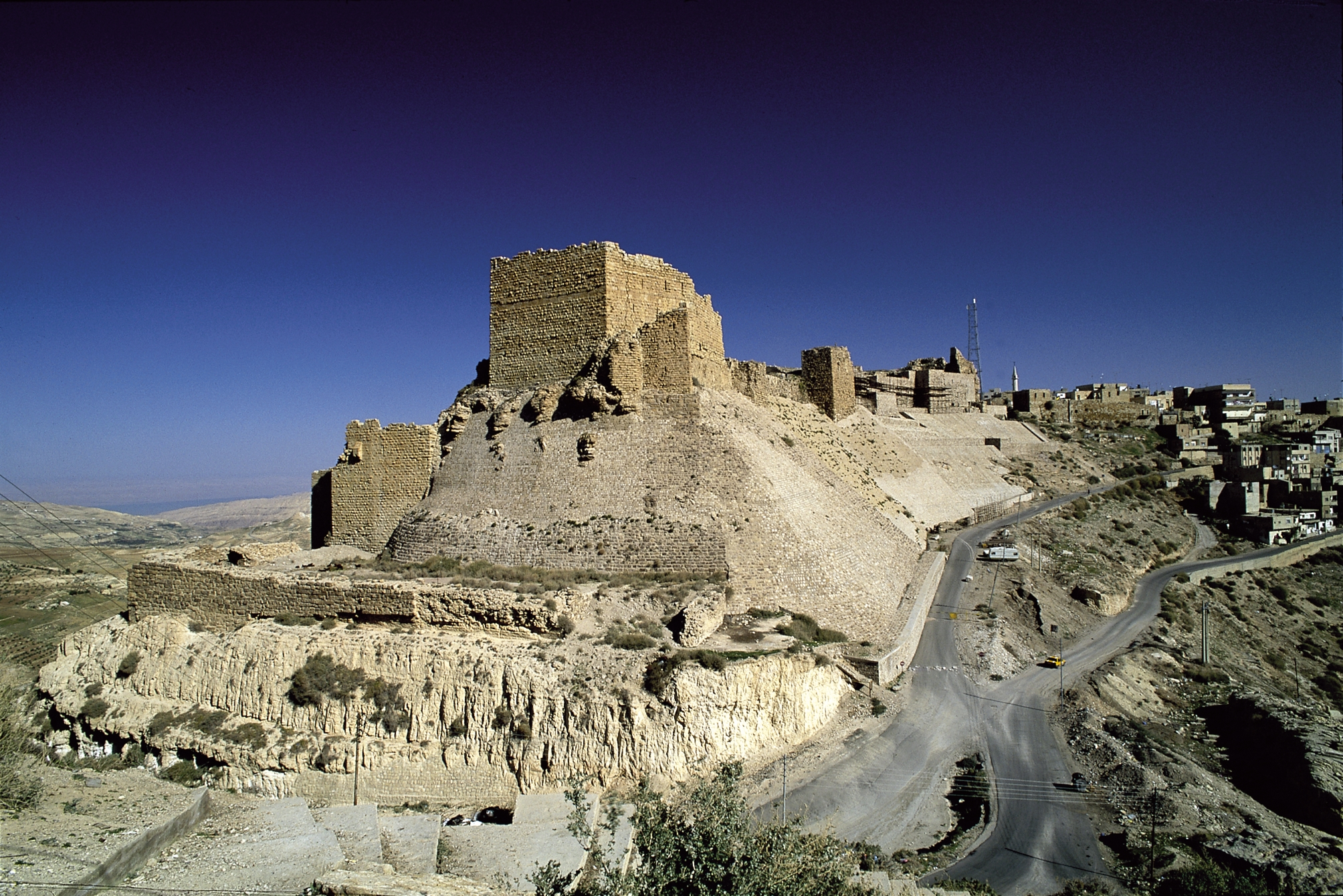
Kerak Castle, a major fortress in the Lordship of Transjordan (present-day al-Karak in Jordan)

Raynald was the only Christian leader who fought against Saladin in the 1180s. The contemporary chronicler Ernoul mentions two raids that Raynald made against caravans travelling between Egypt and Syria, breaking the truce. Modern historians debate whether Raynald's military actions sprang from a desire for booty, or were deliberate maneuvers to prevent Saladin from annexing new territories. After as-Salih died on 18 November 1181, Saladin tried to seize Aleppo, but Raynald stormed into Saladin's territory, reaching as far as Tabuk on the route between Damascus and Mecca. Saladin's nephew, Farrukh Shah, invaded Transjordan instead of attacking Aleppo to compel Raynald to return from the Arabian Desert. Before long, Raynald seized a caravan and imprisoned its members. On Saladin's protest, Baldwin IV ordered Raynald to free them, but Raynald refused. His defiance annoyed the king, enabling Raymond III of Tripoli's partisans to reconcile him with the monarch. A close relative of Baldwin, Raymond had assumed the regency in 1174 but was banned from the kingdom for allegedly plotting against the ailing king. Raymond's return to the royal court put an end to Raynald's paramount position. After accepting the new situation, Raynald cooperated with the king and Raymond during the fights against Saladin in the summer of 1182.

Saladin revived the Egyptian naval force and tried to capture Beirut, but his ships were forced to retreat. Raynald ordered the building of at least five ships in Transjordan. They were carried across the Negev desert to the Gulf of Aqaba at the northern end of the Red Sea in January or February 1183. He captured the fort of Ayla (present-day Eilat in Israel), and attacked the Egyptian fortress on Pharaoh's Island. Part of his fleet made a plundering raid along the coasts against ships delivering Muslim pilgrims and goods, threatening the security of the holy cities of Mecca and Medina. Raynald left the island, but his fleet continued the siege. Saladin's brother, al-Adil, the governor of Egypt, dispatched a fleet to the Red Sea. The Egyptians relieved Pharaoh's Island and destroyed the Christian fleet. Some of the soldiers were captured near Medina because they landed either to escape or to attack the city. Raynald's men were executed, and Saladin took an oath that he would never forgive him. Though Raynald's naval expedition "showed a remarkable degree of initiative" according to Hamilton, most modern historians agree that it contributed to the unification of Syria and Egypt under Saladin's rule. Saladin captured Aleppo in June 1183, completing the encirclement of the crusader states.

Baldwin IV, who had become seriously ill, made Guy of Lusignan regent in October 1183. Within a month, Baldwin had dismissed Guy and had his nephew and Guy's stepson, the five-year-old Baldwin V, crowned king in association with himself. Raynald was not present at Baldwin V's coronation because he was at the wedding of his stepson, Humphrey, and Baldwin IV's half-sister, Isabella, in Kerak. Saladin unexpectedly invaded Transjordan, forcing the local inhabitants to seek refuge in Kerak. After Saladin broke into the town, Raynald only managed to escape to the fortress because one of his retainers had hindered the attackers from seizing the bridge between the town and the castle. Saladin laid siege to Kerak. According to Ernoul, Raynald's wife sent dishes from the wedding to Saladin, persuading him to stop bombarding the tower where her son and his wife stayed. After envoys from Kerak informed Baldwin IV of the siege, the royal army left Jerusalem for Kerak under the command of the king and Raymond III of Tripoli. Saladin abandoned the siege before their arrival on 4 December. On Saladin's order, Izz ad-Din Usama had a fortress built at Ajloun, near the northern border of Raynald's domains.

=== Kingmaker ===
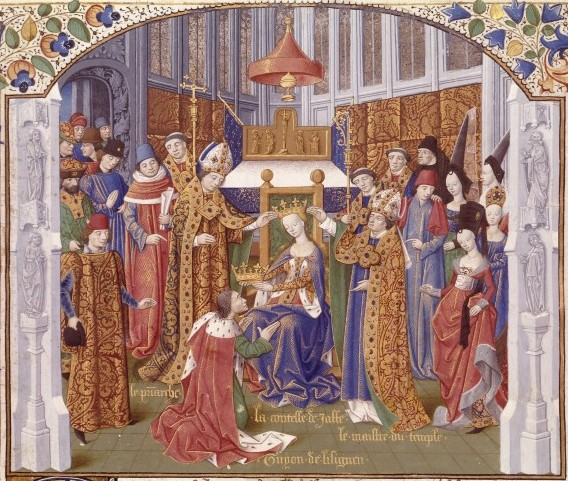
Coronation of Guy of Lusignan by his wife Sybilla of Jerusalem, who was proclaimed queen with Raynald's assistance (from a late-15th-century manuscript of William of Tyre's Historia and its Continuation).

Baldwin IV died in early 1185. His successor, Baldwin V, died in late summer 1186. The High Court of Jerusalem had ruled that neither Baldwin V's mother, Sybilla, nor her half-sister Isabella could be crowned without the decision of the pope, the Holy Roman Emperor, and the kings of France and England on Baldwin V's lawful successor. However, Sybilla's uncle, Joscelin III of Courtenay, took control of Jerusalem with the support of Raynald and other influential prelates and royal officials. Raynald urged the townspeople to accept Sybilla as the lawful monarch, according to the Estoire d'Eracles. Raymond of Tripoli and his supporters tried to prevent her coronation and reminded her partisans of the decision of the High Court. Ignoring their protest, Raynald and Gerard of Ridefort, Grand Master of the Knights Templar, accompanied Sybilla to the Holy Sepulchre, where she was crowned. She also arranged the coronation of her husband, Guy, although he was unpopular even among her supporters. Her opponents tried to persuade Raynald's stepson, Humphrey, to claim the crown on his wife's behalf, but Humphrey deserted them and swore fealty to Sybilla and Guy. Raynald headed the list of secular witnesses in four royal charters issued between 21 October 1186 and 7 March 1187, showing that he had become a principal figure in the new king's court.

Ali ibn al-Athir and other Muslim historians stated that Raynald made a separate truce with Saladin in 1186. This "seems unlikely to be true", according to Hamilton, because the truce between the Kingdom of Jerusalem and Saladin legally covered Raynald's domains as they formed a large fiefdom in the kingdom. In late 1186 or early 1187, a rich caravan travelled through Transjordan from Egypt to Syria. Ali ibn al-Athir mentioned that a group of armed men accompanied the caravan. Raynald seized the caravan, possibly because he regarded the presence of soldiers as a breach of the truce, according to Hamilton. He took all the merchants and their families prisoner, seized a large amount of booty, and refused to receive envoys from Saladin demanding compensation. Saladin sent his envoys to King Guy, who accepted his demands. However, Raynald refused to obey the king, stating in the words of the Estoire d'Eracles that "he was lord of his land, just as Guy was lord of his, and he had no truces with the Saracens". For Barber, Raynald's disobedience indicates that the kingdom was "on the brink of breaking up into a collection of semi-autonomous fiefdoms" under Guy's rule. Saladin proclaimed a jihad (or holy war) against the kingdom, taking an oath that he would personally kill Raynald for breaking the truce. The historian Paul M. Cobb remarks that Saladin "badly needed a victory against the Franks to silence those who criticized him for spending so much time at war with his fellow Muslims".

Ali ibn al-Athir on Raynald's attack against a caravan

Prince Reynald, lord of Kerak, was one of the greatest and wickedest of the Franks, the most hostile to the Muslims and the most dangerous to them. Aware of this, Saladin targeted him with blockades time after time and raided his territory occasion after occasion. As a result he was abashed and humbled and asked Saladin for a truce, which was granted. The truce was made and duly sworn to. Caravans then went back and forth between Syria and Egypt. [In the year 582 AH], a large caravan, rich in goods and with many men, accompanied by a good number of soldiers, passed by him. The accursed one treacheously seized every last man and made their goods, animals and weapons his booty. Those he made captive he consigned to his prisons. Saladin sent blaming him, deploring his treacherous action and threatening him if he did not release the captives and the goods, but he would not agree to do that and persisted in his refusal. Saladin vowed that, if ever had him in his power, he would kill him.

— Ali ibn al-Athir, The Complete History

== Capture and execution ==
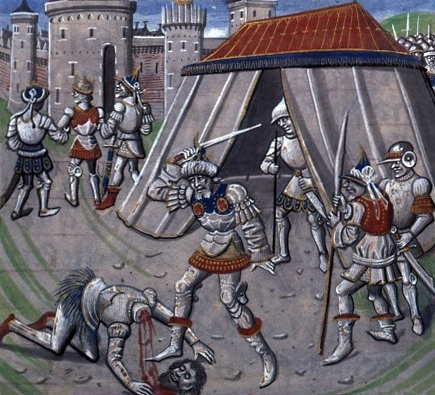
Execution of Raynald at Hattin (from a 15th-century manuscript of William of Tyre's Historia and its Continuation)

The Estoire d'Eracles incorrectly claims that Saladin's sister was also among the prisoners taken by Raynald when he seized the caravan. She returned from Mecca to Damascus in a separate pilgrim caravan in March 1187. To protect her against an attack by Raynald, Saladin escorted the pilgrims while they were travelling near Transjordan. Saladin stormed into Transjordan on 26 April and pillaged Raynald's domains for a month. Thereafter, Saladin marched to Ashtara on the road between Damascus and Tiberias, where the troops coming from all parts of his realm assembled.

The Christian forces assembled at Sepphoris. Raynald and Gerard of Ridefort persuaded King Guy to take the initiative and attack Saladin's army, although Raymond of Tripoli had tried to persuade the king to avoid a direct fight with it. During the debate, Raynald accused Raymond of co-operating with the enemy. Raynald and Rideford had fatally misjudged the situation. Saladin inflicted a crushing defeat on the crusaders in the Battle of Hattin on 4 July, and most commanders of the Christian army were captured on the battlefield.

Guy and Raynald were among the prisoners who were brought before Saladin. Saladin handed a cup of iced rose water to Guy. After drinking from the cup, Guy handed it to Raynald. Imad ad-Din al-Isfahani (who was present) recorded that Raynald drank from the cup. Since customary law prescribed that a man who gave food or drink to a prisoner could not kill him, Saladin pointed out that it was Guy who had given the cup to Raynald. After calling Raynald to his tent, Saladin accused him of many crimes (including brigandage and blasphemy), offering him to choose between conversion to Islam or death, according to Imad ad-Din and Ibn al-Athir. After Raynald flatly refused to convert, Saladin took a sword and struck Raynald with it. As Raynald fell to the ground, Saladin beheaded him. The reliability of the reports of Saladin's offer to Raynald is subject to scholarly debate, because the Muslim authors who recorded them may have only wanted to improve Saladin's image. Ernoul's chronicle and the Estoire d'Eracles recount the events ending with Raynald's execution in almost the same language as the Muslim authors. However, according to Ernoul's chronicle, Raynald refused to drink from the cup that Guy handed to him. According to Ernoul, Raynald's head was struck off by Saladin's soldiers and it was brought to Damascus to be "dragged along the ground to show the Saracens, whom the prince had wronged, that vengeance had been exacted". Baha ad-Din also wrote that Raynald's fate shocked Guy, but Saladin soon comforted him, stating that "A king does not kill a king, but that man's perfidy and insolence went too far".

== Family ==
Raynald's first wife, Constance of Antioch (born in 1128), was the only daughter of Bohemond II of Antioch and Alice of Jerusalem. Constance succeeded her father in Antioch in 1130. Six years later, she married Raymond of Poitiers who died in 1149. The widowed Constance's marriage to Raynald is described as "the misalliance of the century" by Hamilton, but Buck emphasises that "the marriage went unmentioned in Western chronicles". Buck adds that Raynald's relatively low birth "actually made him the ideal candidate" to marry the widowed princess who had a son with a strong claim to rule upon reaching the age of majority, and Raynald was possibly "expected to eventually step aside".

Agnes, Raynald's eldest daughter with Constance, moved to Constantinople in early 1170 to marry Alexios-Béla, the younger brother of Stephen III of Hungary, who lived in the Byzantine Empire. Agnes was renamed Anna in Constantinople. Her husband succeeded his brother as Béla III of Hungary in 1172. She followed Béla to Hungary, where she gave birth to seven children before she died around 1184. Raynald and Constance's second daughter, Alice, became the third wife of Azzo VI of Este in 1204. Raynald also had a son, Baldwin, from Constance, according to Hamilton and Buck, but Runciman says that Baldwin was Constance's son from her first husband. Baldwin moved to Constantinople in the early 1160s. He died fighting at the head of a Byzantine cavalry regiment in the Battle of Myriokephalon on 17 September 1176.

Raynald's second wife, Stephanie of Milly, was the younger daughter of Philip of Milly, Lord of Nablus, and his wife, Isabella. She was born around 1145. Her first husband, Humphrey III of Toron, died around 1173. She inherited Transjordan from her niece, Beatrice Brisbarre, shortly before she married Miles of Plancy in early 1174. Miles was murdered in October 1174.

== Historiography and perceptions ==
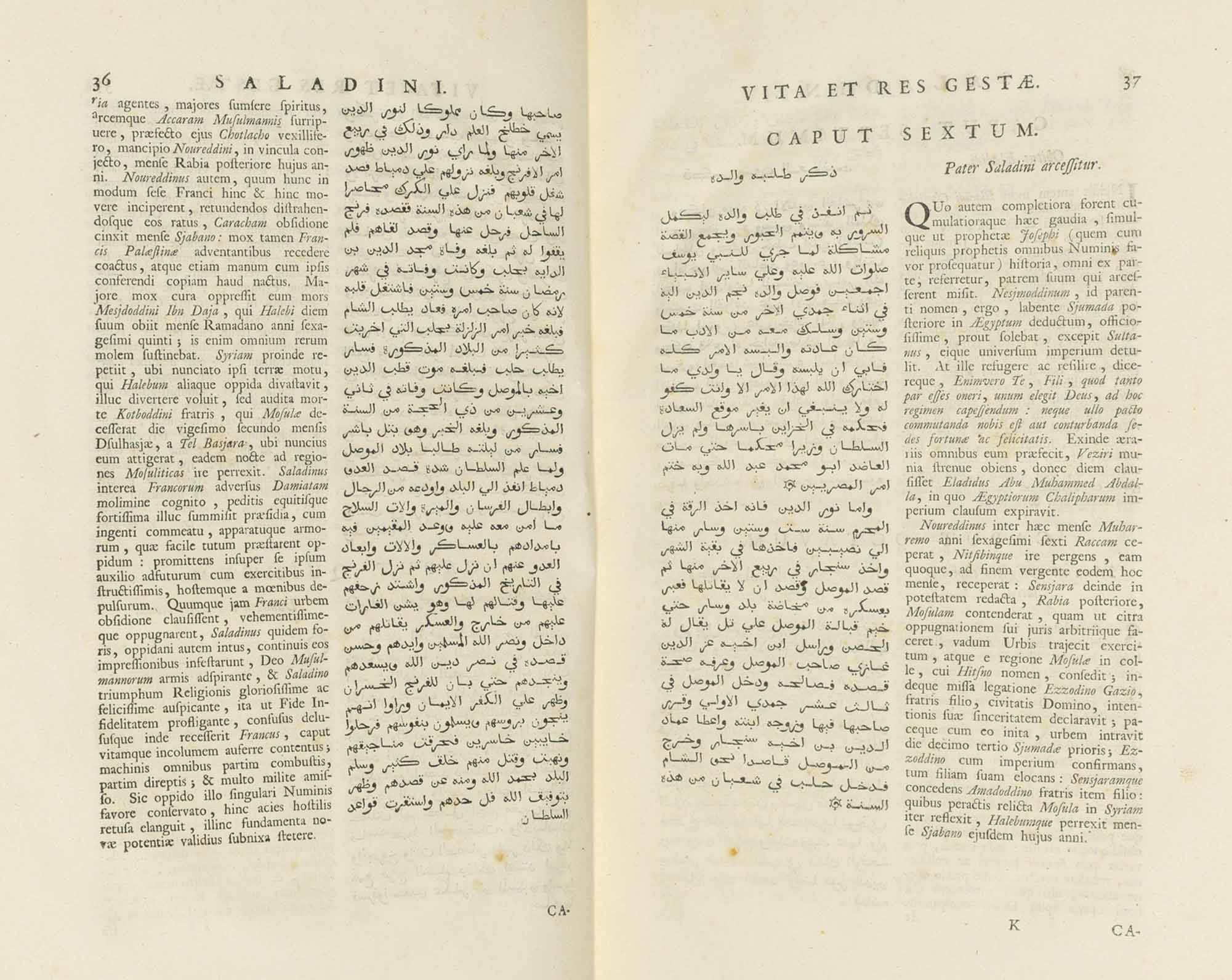
Baha ad-Din ibn Shaddad's biography of Saladin with parallel Arabic and Latin text, published in 1732. Baha ad-Din's work contains several (mainly negative) references to Raynald.

Most information on Raynald's life was recorded by Muslim authors, who were hostile to him, according to Hamilton. Baha ad-Din ibn Shaddad described him as a "monstrous infidel and terrible oppressor" in his biography of Saladin. Saladin compared Raynald with the king of Ethiopia who had tried to destroy Mecca in 570 and was called the "Elephant" in the Surah Fil of the Quran. Ibn al-Athir described him as "one of the most devilish of the Franks, and one of the most demonic", adding that Raynald "had the strongest hostility to the Muslims". Islamic extremists regard Raynald as a symbol of their enemies: one of the two mail bombs hidden in a cargo aircraft in 2010 was addressed to "Reynald Krak" in clear reference to him.

Most Christian authors who wrote of Raynald in the 12th and 13th centuries were influenced by Raynald's political opponent, William of Tyre. The author of the Estoire d'Eracles stated that Raynald's attack against a caravan at the turn of 1186 and 1187 was the "reason of the loss of the Kingdom of Jerusalem". Modern historians have usually also treated Raynald as a "maverick who did more harm to the Christian than to the [Muslim] cause". Runciman describes him as a marauder who could not resist the temptation presented by the rich caravans passing through Transjordan. He argues that Raynald attacked a caravan during the 1180 truce because he "could not understand a policy that ran counter to his wishes". Cobb introduces Raynald as the "[r]elentless nemesis of Saladin", adding that Raynald's provocative actions inevitably led to Saladin's fatal invasion against the Kingdom of Jerusalem. Along with Guy of Lusignan and the Knights Templar, Raynald is one of the negative characters in the Kingdom of Heaven, an epic action movie directed by Ridley Scott and released in 2005. Portrayed by Brendan Gleeson, Raynald is presented in the film as an aggressive Christian fanatic who deliberately provokes a conflict with the Muslims to achieve their total destruction.

Some Christian authors regarded Raynald as a martyr for the faith. After learning of Raynald's death from King Guy's brother Geoffrey of Lusignan, Peter of Blois dedicated a book (entitled Passion of Prince Raynald of Antioch) to him shortly after his death. The Passion underlines that Raynald defended the True Cross at Hattin. Among modern historians, Hamilton portrays Raynald as "an experienced and responsible crusader leader" who made several attempts to prevent Saladin from uniting the Muslim realms along the borders of the crusader states. His comments are described by Cobb as "attempts to dispel" Raynald's "bad press". The historian Alex Mallett refers to Raynald's naval expedition as "one of the most extraordinary episodes in the history of the Crusades, and yet one of the most overlooked". In 2017, the journalist Jeffrey Lee published a biography about Raynald, entitled God's Wolf, presenting him, according to the historian John Cotts, in a nearly hagiographic style as a loyal, valiant, and talented warrior. Lee's book was praised by James Delingpole—a blogger associated with Breitbart—who attributed Raynald's bad reputation in the Western world to "cultural self-hatred", but historians such as Matthew Gabriele sharply criticised Lee's approach. Gabriele concludes that Lee's book "does violence to the study of the past" due to his uncritical use of primary sources and his obvious attempt to make a connection between medieval history and 21st-century politics.

== Sources ==
=== Primary sources ===
- The Chronicle of Ibn al-Athir for the Crusading Period from Al-Kamil Fi'l-Ta'rikh (Part 2: The Years 541–582/1146–1193: The Age of Nur ad-Din and Saladin) (Translated by D. S. Richards) (2007). Ashgate. ISBN 978-0-7546-4078-3.
- The Rare and Excellent History of Saladin or al-Nawādir al-Sultaniyya wa'l-Maḥāsin al-Yūsufiyya by Bahā' ad-Dīn Yusuf ibn Rafi ibn Shaddād (Translated by D. S. Richards) (2001). Ashgate. ISBN 978-0-7546-0143-2.

=== Secondary sources ===
- Baldwin, Marshall W. (1969) [1955]. "The Latin States under Baldwin III and Amalric I, 1143–1174; The Decline and Fall of Jerusalem, 1174–1189". In Baldwin, Marshall W. (ed.). The First Hundred Years. A History of the Crusades. Vol. I. The University of Wisconsin Press. pp. 528–561, 590–621. ISBN 978-0-2990-4834-1.
- Barber, Malcolm (2012). The Crusader States. Yale University Press. ISBN 978-0-3001-1312-9.
- Buck, Andrew D. (2017). The Principality of Antioch and Its Frontiers in the Twelfth Century. The Boydell Press. ISBN 978-1-7832-7173-3.
- Chiappini, Luciano (2001). Gli Estensi: Mille anni di storia [The Este: A Thousand Years of History] (in Italian). Corbo Editore. ISBN 978-8-8826-9029-8.
- Cobb, Paul M. (2016) [2014]. The Race for Paradise: An Islamic History of the Crusades. Oxford University Press. ISBN 978-0-1987-8799-0.
- Cotts, John D. (2021). "Oppressor, Martyr, and Hollywood Villain: Reynald of Châtillon and the Representation of Crusading Violence". In Horswell, Mike; Skottki, Kristin (eds.). The Making of Crusading Heroes and Villains. Engaging the Crusades: The Memory and Legacy of the Crusades. Vol. 4. Routledge. pp. 42–59. ISBN 978-0-3672-6444-4.
- Delingpole, James (28 July 2018). "Why Have We Forgotten the Greatest of All Crusaders?". The Spectator. The Spectator (1828) Ltd. ISSN 2059-6499.
- Gabriele, Matthew (Fall 2018). Spall, Richard (ed.). "Book Review. God's Wolf: The Life of the Most Notorious of All Crusaders, Scourge of Saladin. By Jeffrey Lee". The Historian. 80 (3). Taylor and Francis: 332. doi:10.1111/hisn.12980. ISSN 0018-2370.
- Hamilton, Bernard (1978). Baker, Derek (ed.). "The Elephant of Christ: Reynald of Châtillon". Studies in Church History. 15 (15: Religious Motivation: Biographical and Sociological Problems for the Church Historian). Cambridge University Press: 97–108. doi:10.1017/S0424208400008950. ISSN 0424-2084. S2CID 163740720.
- Hamilton, Bernard (2000). The Leper King and His Heirs: Baldwin IV and the Crusader Kingdom of Jerusalem. Cambridge University Press. ISBN 978-0-5216-4187-6.
- Lock, Peter (2006). The Routledge Companion to the Crusades. Routledge Companions to History. Routledge. ISBN 978-0-4153-9312-6.
- Liu, Yiou (2017). "Kingdom of Heaven and Its Ideological Message". Cinej Cinema Journal. 6 (1). University Library System of the University of Pittsburgh: 85–93. doi:10.5195/cinej.2017.158. ISSN 2159-2411.
- Makk, Ferenc (1994). "Anna (1.); Béla III". In Kristó, Gyula; Engel, Pál; Makk, Ferenc (eds.). Korai magyar történeti lexikon (9–14. század) [Encyclopedia of the Early Hungarian History (9th–14th centuries)] (in Hungarian). Akadémiai Kiadó. pp. 47, 91–92. ISBN 978-9-6305-6722-0.
- Mallett, Alex (2008). "A Trip down the Red Sea with Reynald of Châtillon". Journal of the Royal Asiatic Society. 18 (2). Cambridge University Press: 141–153. doi:10.1017/S1356186307008024. ISSN 1356-1863. S2CID 162979332.
- Mallett, Alex (2014). Popular Muslim Reactions to the Franks in the Levant, 1097–1291. Routledge. ISBN 978-1-3170-7798-5.
- Morton, Nicholas (2020). The Crusader States and their Neighbours: A Military History, 1099–1187. Oxford University Press. ISBN 978-0-1988-2454-1.
- Nicholson, Robert Lawrence (1973). Joscelyn III and the Fall of the Crusader States, 1154–1199. Brill. ISBN 978-9-0040-3676-5.
- Richard, Jean (1989). "Aux origines d'un grand lignage: Des Palladii à Renaud de Châtillon" [On the Origins of a Great Lineage: From the Palladii to Raynald of Châtillon]. Media in Francia: Recueil de mélanges offert à Karl Ferdinand Werner à l'occasion de son 65e anniversaire par ses amis et collègues français [Media in France: A Collection of Various Studies Offered to Karl Ferdinand Werner on the Occasion of his 65th birthday by his French Friends and Colleagues]. Hérault-Éditions. pp. 409–418. ISBN 978-2-9038-5157-6.
- Runciman, Steven (1989) [1951]. The Kingdom of Jerusalem and the Frankish East, 1100-1187. A History of the Crusades. Vol. II. Cambridge University Press. ISBN 978-0-5210-6163-6.

Raynald of Châtillon House of Châtillon Born: c. 1125 Died: 4 July 1187
Regnal titles
Preceded by Constance	Prince of Antioch; 1153–1160/1161; With: Constance	Succeeded by Constance
