= Siege of Kerak (1183) =

Siege of the Crusades

- Part of the Crusades
Date	Early November – 3 December 1183
Location	Kerak Castle, then part of Kingdom of Jerusalem 31°10′51″N 35°42′5″E
Result	Siege lifted

Belligerents
Lordship of Transjordan	Ayyubid Dynasty

Commanders and leaders
Raynald of Châtillon; Stephanie of Milly	Saladin; Al-Adil I

Kerak Castle, one of the most impregnable strongholds in the Kingdom of Jerusalem, underwent its first significant siege in late 1183. Saladin, ruler of Egypt and Damascus, besieged Kerak in early November 1183 after its lord, Raynald of Châtillon, conducted raids of Saladin's lands.

Saladin set out from Damascus on 22 October and besieged Kerak as it hosted the wedding of Raynald's stepson Humphrey IV of Toron and King Baldwin IV's half-sister Isabella. Raynald attempted to delay the siege by defending the walled settlement outside the fortress, but it fell quickly. Despite this success and intense bombardment, Saladin was unable to make progress, hindered by Kerak's deep moat and mountainous terrain. When ailing King Baldwin learned about the siege, he found himself obligated to settle his succession before mustering a relief force. After the coronation of his nephew, Baldwin V, he accompanied his army to Kerak but ceded command to his kinsman Count Raymond III of Tripoli. Saladin refused to engage the royal army and lifted the siege on 3 December.

== Background ==
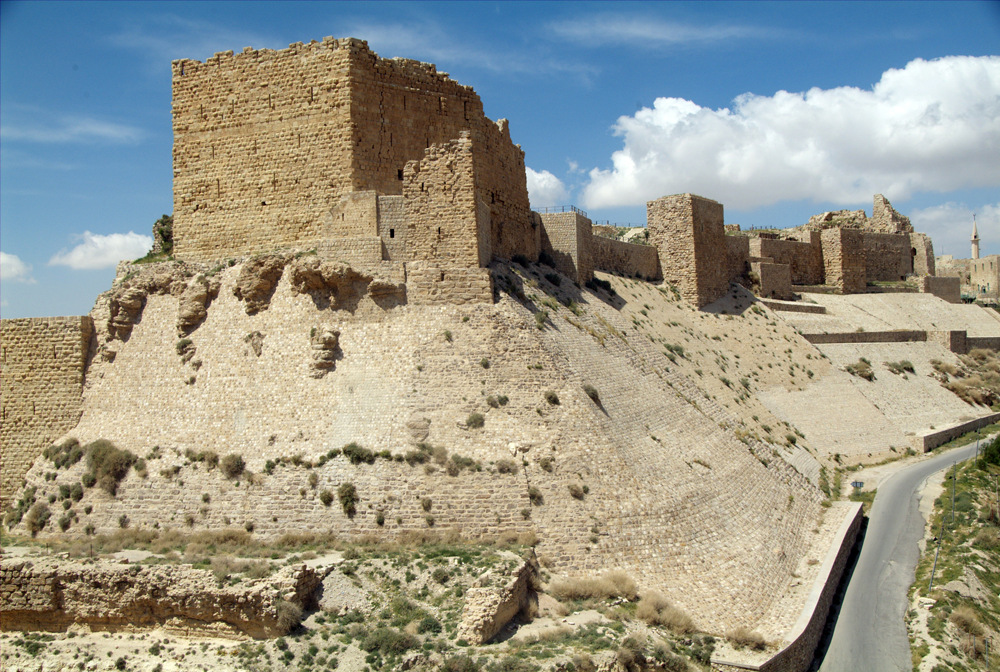
A steep escarpment, together with a deep moat, made Kerak a formidable fortress.

After establishing his rule over both Egypt and Damascus in 1174, the Muslim ruler Saladin became a grave threat to the crusader Kingdom of Jerusalem. Teenage King Baldwin IV was a minor at the time, and the kingdom was ruled in his name by Count Raymond III of Tripoli, who did not act to prevent Saladin's encirclement of the kingdom. Baldwin began ruling upon reaching the age of majority in 1176 and immediately changed course, determined to curb Saladin's growing power. Baldwin had leprosy and relied heavily on Raynald of Châtillon, whom he rewarded with marriage to the lady of Transjordan, Stephanie of Milly, in 1177. The principal holdings of Stephanie and Raynald were the castles of Montreal and Kerak; the latter was one of the most impregnable fortresses in the kingdom.

Baldwin and Raynald led the royal army against Saladin in two battles in 1179: at Montgisard, where they were victorious, and at Marj Ayyun, where Saladin defeated them. The garrisons of Kerak and Montreal lost 100 men in a Muslim ambush in mid-1182, leaving Kerak undermanned. In February 1183, Raynald orchestrated raids of Saladin's lands along the coast of the Red Sea. By that time, leprosy had left King Baldwin blind and unable to use his hands or walk unsupported. Succession rested on his older sister, Sibylla. He appointed her husband, Guy of Lusignan, to govern the kingdom as regent in his name, but the kingdom's nobles refused to cooperate with Guy on military campaigns. Baldwin and Sibylla's younger half-sister, Isabella, lived at Kerak as the betrothed of Stephanie's son, Humphrey IV of Toron.

== Attack ==
=== Preparations ===
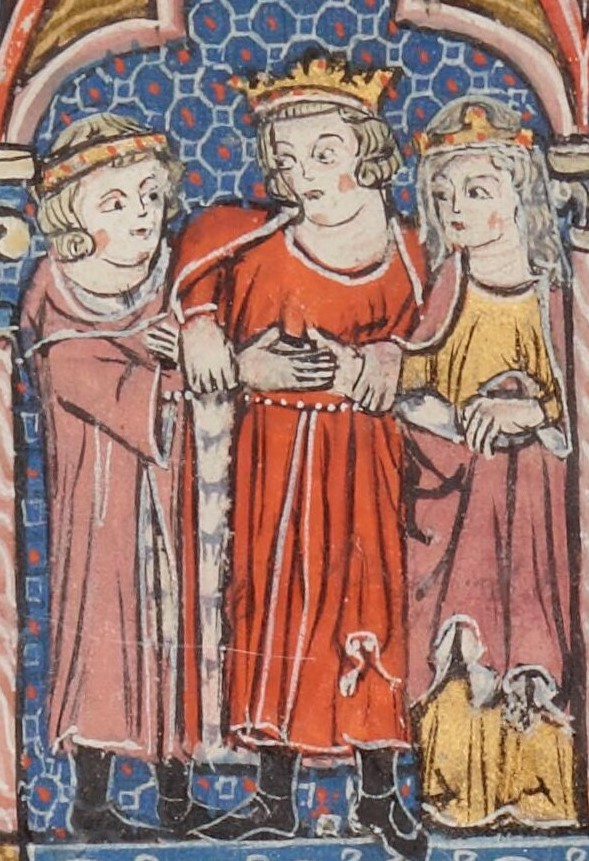
Kerak was besieged just as it hosted a royal wedding. The attackers hoped to capture valuable prisoners.

The wedding of Isabella and Humphrey was scheduled for October 1183, by which time Isabella had entered her twelfth year, the minimum age at which girls could marry according to the Catholic canon law. Celebrations were organized far ahead of time, and professional performers–dancers, jugglers and musicians–summoned from throughout the Latin East flocked to Kerak. The groom's stepfather, Raynald, arrived to host the guests, which included some of the leading people in the kingdom; many of them were Raynald's bitter enemies, including the bride's mother, Queen Maria. The wedding preparations likely alerted Saladin, who probably timed the attack on Kerak to coincide with the festivities. If successful, it would have enabled him both to retaliate against Raynald for the Red Sea raids and to secure high-ranking captives whose ransoms could help offset the costs of the expedition.

Saladin's move into Transjordan appears to have served not only to target Kerak but also to effect an administrative rearrangement: his brother Al-Adil had requested to give up his governorship of Egypt and assume control of Aleppo and northern Syria instead. Additionally, the attack provided an opportunity for Saladin to receive fresh troops from Egypt. As Saladin departed from Damascus on 22 October, Al-Adil set out with part of the Egyptian army, his treasury, and household, accompanied by merchants who used the army's protection to travel safely to Syria. Along with Saladin's army came throwing machines and other siege engines, which he had prepared ahead of time.

=== Capture of town ===
Saladin concentrated his main army at Rabba, roughly 10 km to the north of Kerak, before advancing to the fortress and surrounding it in early November. Because access was blocked from all other sides by a steep escarpment, Kerak Castle could be approached only through its faubourg, a settlement separated from the castle by a 28–30-meter-deep defensive moat. Archbishop William of Tyre, chancellor of the kingdom at the time, described Kerak and the adjacent town in his chronicle:

Clustering on the outskirts of this fortress, on the site of the earlier city, was now a village whose inhabitants had placed their homes there as a comparatively safe location. East [south] of them lay the fortress, the best of protection, while on the other side rose the mountain itself, encompassed, as has been said, by deep valleys. Thus, if the village had even a moderately low wall, the inhabitants need not fear any hostile attack. At two points only was there any possibility of reaching the top of the mountain, and these could be easily defended by a few men even against large hostile forces. The other sides were supposed to be impregnable.

Raynald sent a messenger to inform King Baldwin of the attack and had a beacon lit on his keep to signal distress. He mounted a defense of the town in an attempt to delay the siege of the fortress long enough for news of the attack to reach Jerusalem and for a relief force to arrive. His efforts were aided by the townspeople and Syriac Christian farmers and shephers from the area, who had taken refuge there. William of Tyre disapproved of Raynald's strategy, even though he too described the settlement as easily defended. Al-Adil joined Saladin with his army on 22 November.

The townspeople left their livestock in the castle's moat. While the town's defenses were being prepared, Raynald had his cavalry harry Saladin's army to slow their advance. He lacked men and despite the mountainous terrain working in his advantage, the defenses were quickly breached. On 23 November, Raynald decided to abandon the faubourg. As the population and defenders retreated into the fortress in panic, the bridge spanning the moat and connecting the fortress with the town was dislodged; this stopped the attackers but also prevented the defenders from launching any sallies against them, which in turn allowed Saladin to set up his siege engines close to the moat. The townspeople left their houses full of food stockpiled for the approaching winter, and these were occupied by Saladin's army and the accompanying non-combatants. The arrival of the townspeople added further strain to the already overcrowded fortress. Thus began what was probably the first significant siege of Kerak.

=== Bombardment ===
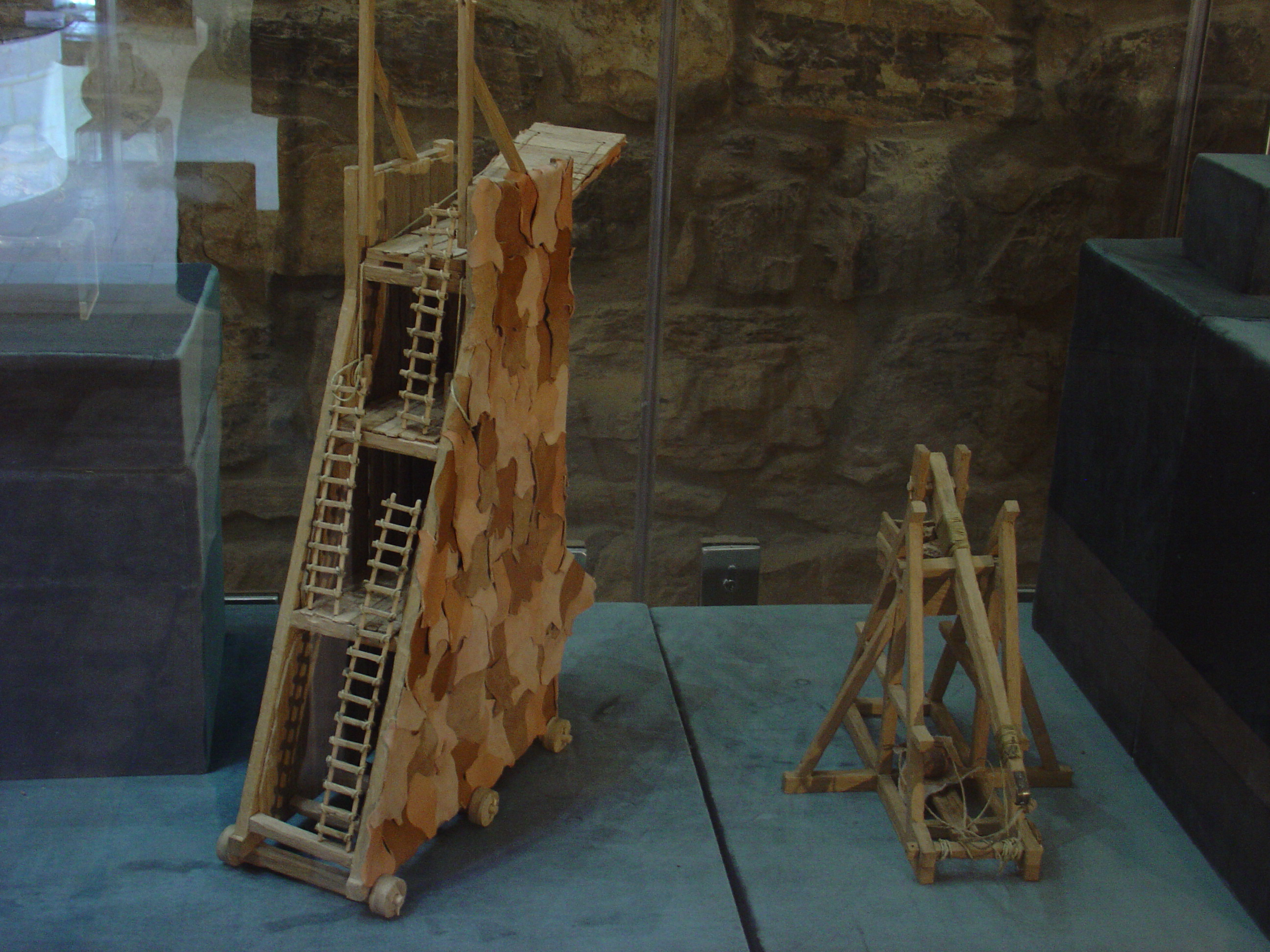
Kerak was incessantly bombarded by siege engines such as these replicas in Kerak Museum, but the stronghold was barely affected.

Humphrey and Isabella's wedding went ahead, possibly on the day the siege was laid. Among the surviving descriptions of the siege, the most detailed is that of Ernoul, who likely draws on information from Queen Maria, mother of the bride and wife of his patron, Balian of Ibelin. According to Ernoul, Stephanie–mother of the groom–sent dishes from the wedding feast to Saladin and reminded him that he had held her in his arms when he was a prisoner at Kerak; Saladin then asked in which tower the newlyweds would spend the night and ordered his engineers not to bombard it. (Note: The story of Saladin's captivity at Kerak, which does not appear in any sources other than Ernoul's chronicle, does not match what it is otherwise known about Saladin's early life, and may belong to a body of legend surrounding Saladin's youth that was in circulation around the time of the Third Crusade (1189–1192). That he would spare the tower occupied by Isabella and Humphrey is plausible, however, because he would not have wished to endanger potential captives of such value.)

William writes that six of Saladin's trebuchets were placed in the town, bombarding the northern side of the fortress, and two more at a place called Obelet, most probably a ridge to the south. Ibn al-Athir, a historian in Saladin's employ, mentions seven trebuchets. The siege engines fired large stones day and night, but could do little damage to the stonework; the stones posed danger only to people who left their shelter, such as a group of builders who attempted to construct a machine on a tower or battlements only to be targeted by the besiegers. The ridge that was the probable location of Obelet was about 115 meters (377 ft) away from the castle's southern defences, which was likely too far for 12th-century artillery to be effective.

As continuous bombardment kept the defenders pinned down and unable to interfere, the besiegers obtained fresh meat after descending by ropes into the moat and killing the livestock that the townspeople had left there. The armies of Saladin and his brother were unable to make progress; Ibn al-Athir suggests that Saladin had brought too few trebuchets, although the number he gives is higher than at any other siege of a crusader fortress up to that point in his history. Kerak's natural defenses, the deep moat, and a sturdy northern wall proved sufficient to withstand the siege, and the stronghold does not appear to have ever been at risk of falling.

== Relief ==
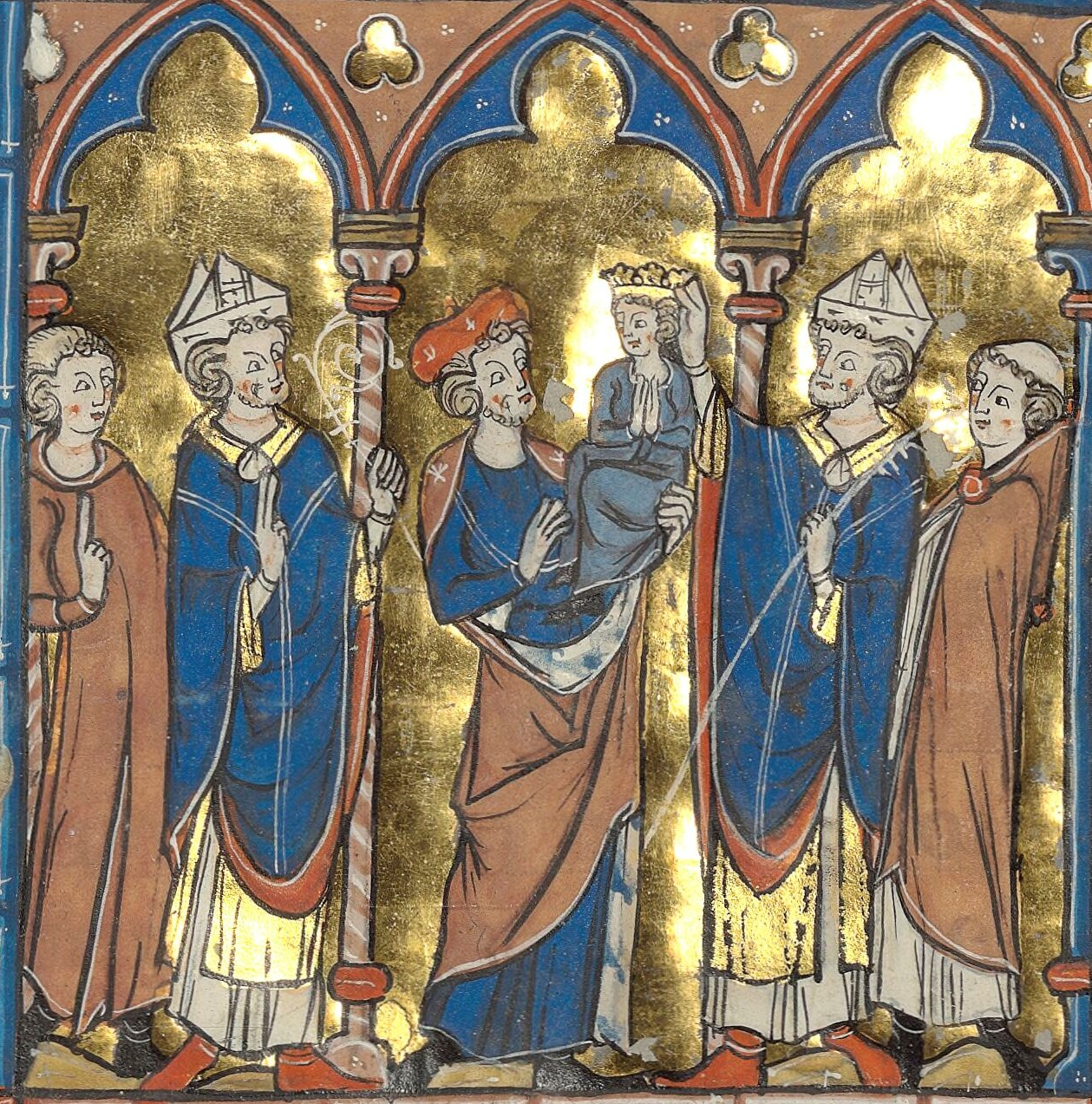
Before a relief force could be sent to Kerak, a political crisis had to be resolved–and the solution was to crown a child king.

In Jerusalem, King Baldwin had convened a council to advise him about the kingdom's affairs when news broke that Kerak was under siege. He promptly dismissed Guy from regency and resumed government. It is probable that Guy's enemies seized the opportunity to remove him from succession; despite the urgency in Transjordan, the council deliberated on who should succeed Baldwin. Joscelin of Courtenay and Raynald, who later proved to be staunch supporters of Sibylla's claim, were not present; Raynald was at Kerak, and Joscelin–her and Baldwin's uncle–may have been there as well. Baldwin and Sibylla's mother, Agnes of Courtenay, offered a solution: Sibylla's son, Baldwin of Montferrat, was crowned as co-king on 20 November.

In late November, Baldwin had a beacon lit on the Tower of David to communicate to the defenders of Kerak that help was on the way. This fire was probably not visible in Kerak, but may have been part of a chain of beacons that could be seen by the defenders, who suffered from overcrowding and intense bombardment.

Despite his illness, Baldwin accompanied his army to Kerak, probably carried in a litter, while Guy led the men of Jaffa and Ascalon. Baldwin was too frail to fight, and upon reaching the Dead Sea, he appointed Raymond of Tripoli to command the host. When scouts informed Saladin that the royal army was approaching Hebron, he became concerned for the safety of Egypt, which had been left without troops. He sent the Egyptian troops back to Egypt with his nephew Taqi al-Din as the new governor. With his forces thus spent, Saladin refused to engage. He abandoned his siege efforts on 3 December and left when the relief force arrived the following day after a three-day march. Baldwin entered Kerak in triumph. Both armies then retreated from Kerak; Saladin was back in Damascus by 12 December.

The threat posed by Raynald left Saladin intent on capturing Kerak. He spent the months following his departure from the siege planning another attack while Raynald carried on with this aggressive policy. In July 1184, Saladin besieged Kerak once again.

== Fiction ==
The 1183 siege of Kerak is depicted in the 2005 film Kingdom of Heaven. Kerak Castle is portrayed as having a large, imposing gate, "meant to impress, to intimidate and evoke mood and emotion", rather than the small, practical gate that the historical castle had. In the film, Baldwin's cavalry confronts Saladin's in front of Kerak Castle.

== Bibliography ==
- Fulton, Michael S. (2024). Crusader Castle: The Desert Fortress of Kerak. Pen and Sword. ISBN 978-1-3990-9129-9.
- Fulton, Michael S. (13 August 2018). Artillery in the Era of the Crusades: Siege Warfare and the Development of Trebuchet Technology. BRILL. ISBN 978-90-04-37692-2.
- Hamilton, Bernard (1978). Baker, Derek (ed.). "The Elephant of Christ: Reynald of Châtillon". Studies in Church History. 15 (15: Religious Motivation: Biographical and Sociological Problems for the Church Historian). Cambridge University Press: 97–108. doi:10.1017/S0424208400008950. ISSN 0424-2084. S2CID 163740720.
- Hamilton, Bernard (2000). The Leper King and His Heirs: Baldwin IV and the Crusader Kingdom of Jerusalem. Cambridge University Press. ISBN 9780521017473.
- Smith, J. Lewis (2005). Kingdom of Heaven: The Ridley Scott Film and the History Behind the Story. Newmarket Press. ISBN 978-1-55704-708-3.
- Runciman, Steven (1952). A History of the Crusades. Vol. II: The Kingdom of Jerusalem. Cambridge University Press. ISBN 0521347718.
