= Sargis Pitsak =

Armenian 14th-century artist

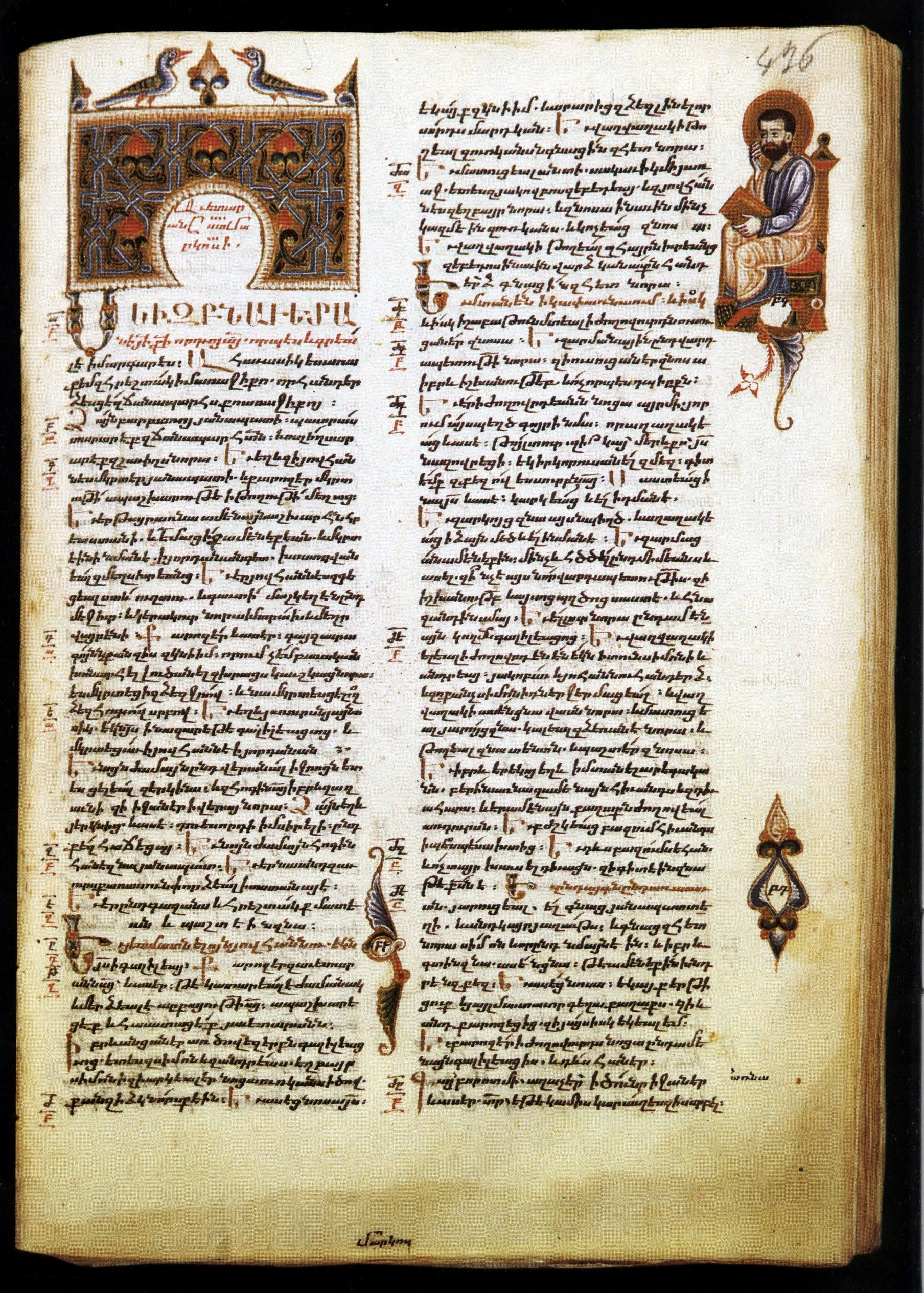
First page of the Gospel of Mark in Armenian, by Sargis Pitsak, 14th century.

Sargis Pitsak (Armenian: Սարգիս Պիծակ) was an early 14th-century Armenian artist. Nearly 50 illustrated manuscripts are attributed to him. His father was called Grigor.

Pitsak lived in Cilicia, during a difficult period when epidemics often followed wars. He copied and illustrated manuscripts on the request of King Leon IV, queen Mariun and others.

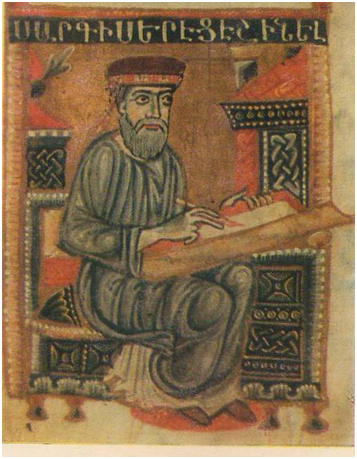
Sargis Pitsak (self portrait in 1338)

Pitsak seems to have been familiar with the work of Toros Roslin and he completed the illustration of a famous Gospel (Matenadaran, Cod. 7651), in which some miniatures reflect Roslin's influence.

== Gallery ==
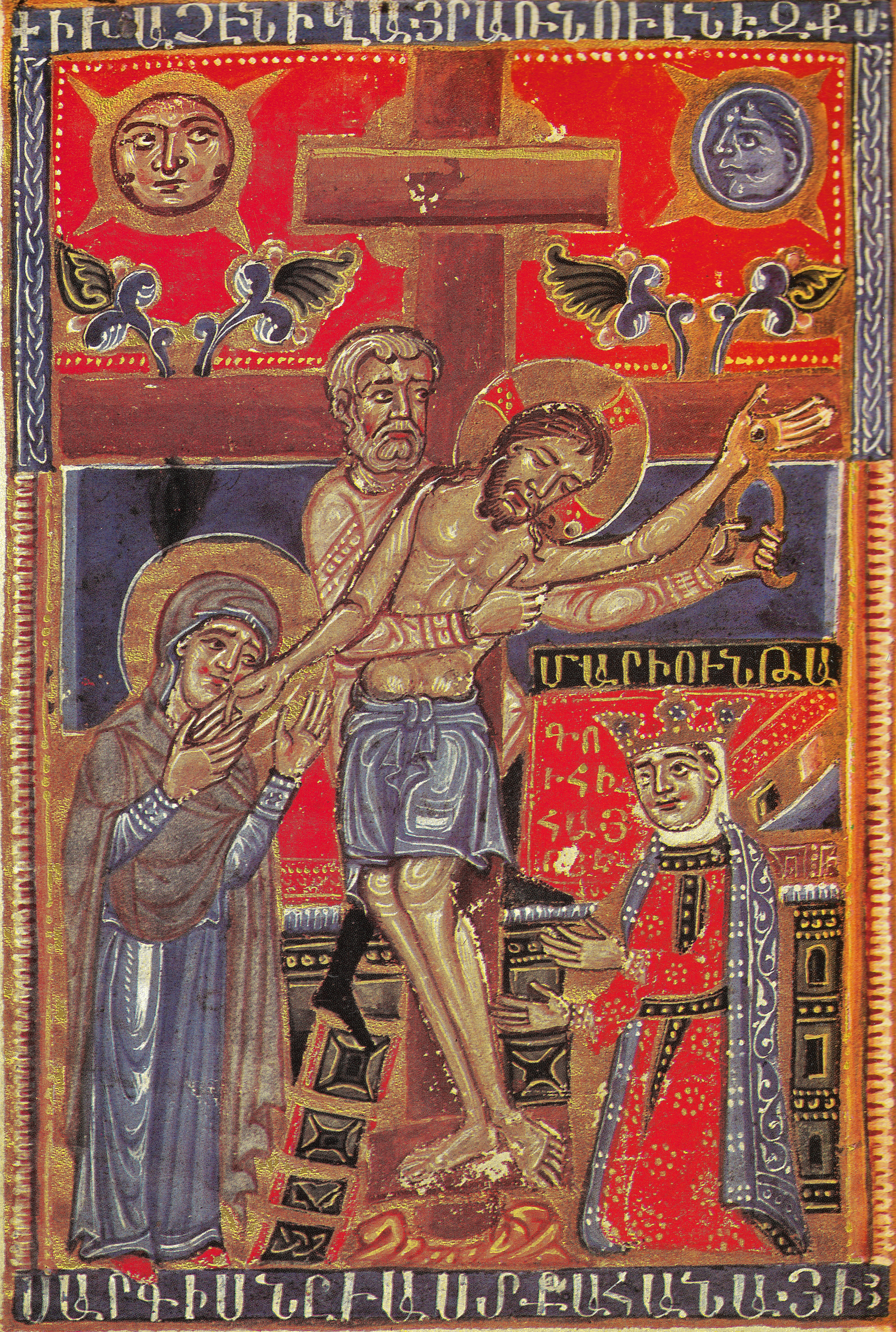
Crucifixion of Jesus. Armenian manuscript of Queen Mariun Gospel, by Sargis Pitsak, 1346.

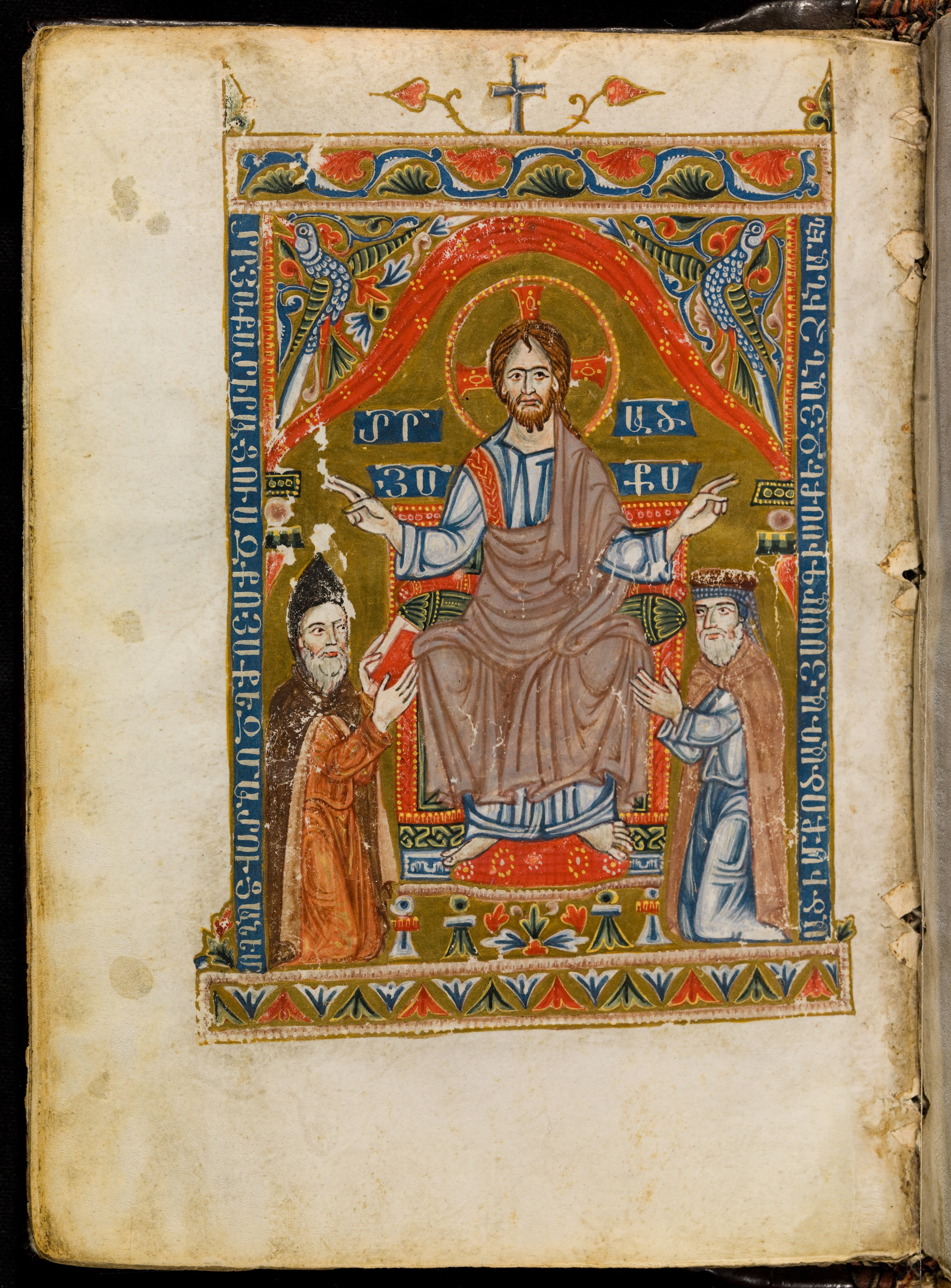
Christ, the donor and the scribe. From the Four Gospels. Drazark monastery, 1342. Chester Beatty Library
