= Raid on Cyprus (1156) =

In 1156, Raynald of Châtillon, Prince of Antioch, and Thoros II, Lord of Cilician Armenia, raided the Byzantine island of Cyprus, inflicting extensive destruction.

== Background ==
Cyprus was attacked by naval forces of the nascent Islamic Caliphate in 648 and again in 654. In 686, an agreement between the Byzantine emperor Justinian II and the Caliph ʿAbd al-Malik ibn Marwān divided the island's tax revenues equally between the two powers. Around 875, Emperor Basil I ended this arrangement, making the island a theme (province), but an Arab invasion in 882 forced him to restore joint Arab–Byzantine rule. Full Byzantine control was restored in 965 under Nikephoros II Phokas, providing a base for the reconquest of the city of Antioch in Syria. The Byzantines lost Antioch to the renegade general Philaretos Brachamios in 1078; in 1084 the city was conquered by the Seljuk leader Suleiman ibn Qutalmish.

The Seljuks, originally a prominent Turkoman clan, formed a loose federation of semi-independent states under their dynasty and other warlords. As the Turkomans seized much of Anatolia, Emperor Alexios I Komnenos sought help from Pope Urban II, who proclaimed the First Crusade in 1095 and inspired enthusiasm by promising spiritual rewards to its participants. The main crusading armies reached Constantinople in November 1096 under the leadership of western nobles, among them Bohemond of Taranto, a Norman leader and veteran of wars against Byzantium. At Alexios's insistence, they swore to restore to the empire any former Byzantine lands they might conquer. After their victories in Anatolia, the crusaders reached Antioch in October 1097. During the siege, Cyprus served as an important base of supply until the city fell in June 1098.

The Crusader states, Cilician Armenia and their neighbours c. 1165

Antioch then became an independent principality under Bohemond and his kinsmen, despite Byzantine claims to suzerainty. In 1137, Emperor John II Komnenos campaigned in Cilicia and Syria and compelled Raymond of Poitiers, Prince of Antioch, to swear fealty to him. Raymond held the principality jure uxoris, as the husband of Bohemond's granddaughter, Princess Constance of Antioch. After John's death, Raymond invaded Cilicia, but was defeated by the imperial army and in 1145 renewed his oath before Emperor Manuel I Komnenos. Raymond was killed at the Battle of Inab in 1149 while fighting against Turkomans. Manuel then tried to extend Byzantine authority by arranging Constance's marriage to his widowed brother-in-law John Roger, but in 1153 she instead married the French Raynald of Châtillon.

Cilicia had long attracted migrants from Greater Armenia, and this movement intensified after the Turkoman advances. Relations between the westerners, or Franks, and the Armenians were generally cordial, strengthened by marriage alliances. By the First Crusade, Cilicia was largely ruled by Armenian warlords, among them Constantine of the Roupenid dynasty. Although the Byzantines conquered Cilicia in 1137, after 1145 the Roupenid Thoros II began to restore his family's lordship. At that time, the Byzantines were preoccupied with wars against the Normans of Sicily and the Hungarians. In an effort to halt Thoros's expansion in Cilicia, Manuel employed Raynald to attack the Armenians.

Raynald marched into Cilicia and defeated Thoros, compelling him to cede lands in the Amanus Mountains to the Principality of Antioch. Raynald then demanded payment of the money Manuel had promised, but Manuel refused. The Byzantinist Ralph-Johannes Lilie argues that Manuel regarded the Armenian defeat as ephemeral, while the historian Steve Tibble tentatively attributes Manuel's refusal to incompetence, treachery, or misunderstanding. In retaliation for this refusal, Raynald formed an alliance with Thoros and agreed to launch a raid on Cyprus.

== Raid ==
The principal sources for the raid are the chronicles of the Frankish William of Tyre and the Byzantine John Kinnamos, while another Byzantine chronicler, Niketas Choniates, fails to mention it. William of Tyre, who loathed Raynald of Châtillon, described him as "a man of violent impulses, both in sinning and in repenting", prompting Tibble to observe that Raynald possessed "many of the natural talents of a pirate". Tibble also emphasises that Raynald's decision illustrates how much easier it was to organise a naval raid against a rural and poorly defended island than to attack Byzantine castles and confront the imperial cavalry. Raynald controlled ports and could readily hire ships, while also drawing on the services of the pirates active in the eastern Mediterranean.

The raiders reached Cyprus in the spring of 1156. Spies operating in the city of Antioch and at the port of Saint Simeon had warned the Byzantine authorities in advance. The island was defended by a weak garrison. A Byzantine militia was raised to confront the raiders, but Raynald inflicted a decisive defeat upon it, thereby eliminating any prospect of further resistance. In Tibble's view, Raynald sought not merely to obtain money, but also to demonstrate how little protection the Byzantine state could offer the Cypriots; consequently, he allowed his troops to "go wild-to burn, to pillage and to kill". The raiders plundered monasteries and raped nuns as well as other women. For days, according to William of Tyre, Raynald "wreaked his fury upon the innocent Cypriots", perpetrating "upon them and upon their wives and children outrages abominable in the sight of both God and men". The twelfth-century Armenian historian Gregory the Priest adds that the raiders cut off the noses and ears of Greek Orthodox priests and systematically plundered houses in both the towns and the countryside. By the end of the expedition, the raiders had amassed, as William of Tyre notes, "a vast amount of riches and spoils of every kind", filling their ships before returning to Antioch.

== Aftermath ==
William of Tyre makes clear that the joint Antiochene–Armenian action against fellow Christians shocked the Franks of the Kingdom of Jerusalem. They were likewise convinced that Raynald and Thoros deserved punishment for it. William of Tyre also notes that Cyprus "had always been useful and friendly" to the Crusader states, thereby contributing to Raynald's later reputation for placing his own personal interests above those of the wider political community.

== Bibliography ==
- Asbridge, Thomas (2012) [2010]. The Crusades: The War for the Holy Land. Simon and Schuster. ISBN 978-1-8498-3688-3.
- Harris, Jonathan (2022). Byzantium and the Crusades. Bloomsbury Publishing. ISBN 978-1-3501-9978-1.
- Holt, P. M. (2004). The Crusader States and their Neighbours. Pearson Longman. ISBN 978-0-582-36931-3.
- Lilie, Ralph-Johannes (2004) [1993]. Byzantium and the Crusader States, 1096–1204. Clarendon Press. ISBN 978-0-19-820407-7.
- Lock, Peter (2006). The Routledge Companion to the Crusades. Routledge Companions to History. Routledge. ISBN 978-0-415-39312-6.
- Tibble, Steve (2025) [2024]. Crusader Criminals: The Knights Who Went Rogue in the Holy Land. Yale University Press. ISBN 978-0-300-28429-4.
- Treadgold, Warren (1997). A History of the Byzantine State and Society. Stanford University Press. ISBN 978-0-8047-2630-6.
