= Philippa of Armenia =

Empress consort of Nicaea
- Tenure: 1214–1216
- Born: 1183
- Died: before 1219
- Spouse: Theodore I Laskaris
- Father: Ruben III, Prince of Armenia
- Mother: Isabella of Toron

Philippa of Armenia (1183 – before 1219) was Empress consort of Nicaea from 1214 until 1216, as the second wife of Emperor Theodore I Lascaris. She was a daughter of Ruben III of Armenia and Isabella of Toron. Her maternal grandparents were Humphrey III of Toron and Stephanie of Milly.

== Princess of Armenia ==
She was a younger sister of Alice of Armenia, later wife of Raymond IV, Count of Tripoli. Her father died in 1186 when Alice was four-years-old and Philippa was only three. He was succeeded by his younger brother of Levon I of Armenia who was initially the "Regent and Tutor" of his young nieces. Their uncle eventually set them aside and was succeeded by his own descendants.

According to the writings of Sempad the Constable, on 3 February 1189/1190, Philippa was betrothed to Schahenscah, a son of Tchordouanel, Lord of Sasun and an unnamed sister of Gregory IV the Young, Armenian Catholicos of Cilicia. At the same time, Alice was betrothed to Hathum, Lord of Sasun, older brother of Schahenscah. The area of Sasun which the two brothers controlled was relatively significant for the Armenian Kingdom of Cilicia at the time and Levon may have been attempting to secure their loyalty through the betrothals.

The marriages of Alice and Philippa occurred somewhere between their dates of betrothal and May, 1193. In May, 1193, Hathum and Schahenscah were both murdered. The sisters are mentioned by Sempad as their widows. Sempad also recorded contemporary rumors of Levon being behind both assassinations. Since Alice was only eleven-years-old and Philippa ten, the marriages were likely not consummated.

On 31 January 1198/1199, Philippa was betrothed to Oshin of Lampron, eldest son of Hathum, Lord of Lampron (c. 1145 – 1218). The marriage never occurred but Sempad does not state any particular reason. Oshin may have succeeded his father in 1218. But in 1220, he was already deceased and the Lord of Lampron was his younger brother Constantine.

== Empress ==
On 24 November 1214, Philippa married Theodore I Laskaris of the Empire of Nicaea. Their marriage is recorded in the chronicle of George Akropolites. They had a son, Constantine Laskaris, born in 1215 and governed the Thracesian Theme in 1249.

However, in 1216, Theodore had the marriage annulled. Philippa was returned to her uncle Levon and their son was disinherited. Although religious reasons were cited the exact causes are not known. It is possible that Levon may have misrepresented Philippa as one of his own daughters in the marriage negotiations, meaning that Theodore may have been looking to secure succession rights to the Armenian throne, while Philippa was only a niece of the monarch and not particularly close in the succession.

When Levon died in May, 1219, he was succeeded by his daughter Zabel. Philippa is not mentioned among his living relatives by Sempad. She had probably died between 1216 and early 1219.

== Bibliography ==
- Sempad the Constable, Le Royaume Armenien de Cilicie.
- George Acropolites, Annales.
- Angelov, Dimiter (2019). The Byzantine Hellene: The Life of Emperor Theodore Laskaris and Byzantium in the Thirteenth Century. Cambridge University Press. ISBN 978-1108480710.

Philippa of Armenia Rubenids Born: 1183 Died: before 1219
Royal titles
Preceded by Anna Angelina	Empress consort of Nicaea; 1214–1216	Succeeded by Marie de Courtenay
