= Drazark monastery =

Armenian Christian monastery and leading cultural center, ca. 900-ca. 1920

Drazark monastery Դրազարկ վանք
- Location within Turkey

Religion
- Affiliation: Armenian Apostolic Church
- Province: Adana province
- Region: Mediterranean
- Ecclesiastical or organizational status: Destroyed in 1915
- Status: Ceased functioning as a monastery in 1915

Location
- Location: (Turkey)
- State: Turkey
- Interactive map of Drazark monastery Դրազարկ վանք
- Coordinates: 37.6640°N 35.8085°E

Architecture
- Type: Church
- Style: Armenian
- Completed: 1100 A.D.

Drazark monastery (Armenian: Դրազարկ վանք) is a destroyed monastic complex of Armenian Apostolic Church in Adana province of modern Turkey, which lies about 40 km. northwest of the city of Sis – historical capital of Cilician Armenia, at one of inaccessible slopes of Cilician Taurus range (middle part of the Taurus Mountains).

== Etymology ==
Drazark in Armenian language directly means knock on the door. But beside Drazark the monastery was known by some other names:

1. T'razark (Armenian: Թրազարկ, lit. 'Sword's strike')
2. P'osivank (Armenian: Փոսիվանք, lit. 'monastery in the hallow')
3. Avag-vank (Armenian: Ավագ վանք, lit. 'main monastery')

== The Exterior ==
Summarizing recollections on Drazark frequently met numerous words like "big, inhabited by angels, notable, extremely outstanding" and similar characterizations which allows to suggest, this was a great monastic complex. Drazark consisted of 5 churches. Main church standing in the middle was called Surb Astvatzatzin (Armenian: Սուրբ Աստվածածին) that in Armenian language means Holy Mother of God. Another 4 churches were attached to it by forming a cross:

1. Surb Nshan (Armenian: Սուրբ Նշան, lit. 'Holy Portent')
2. Surb P'rkich (Armenian: Սուրբ Փրկիչ, lit. 'Holy Savior')
3. Surb Grigor (Armenian: Սուրբ Գրիգոր Լուսավորիչ, lit. 'Saint Gregory the Illuminator')
4. Surb T'oros (Armenian: Սուրբ Թորոս, lit. 'St. Toros, the Armenian form of St. Theodore')

== History ==
The monastery's founding date is unknown, but the first mention of it appears in the 10th century AD. After the earthquake of 1114, Prince Toros I (~1100–1129) of the Rubenid dynasty restored the monastery and added to it a mausoleum for the leadership of the Armenian Church in Cilicia and for the princely families of Armenian Cilicia, as well as an educational center. It also served as the bishop's residence for the Cilician capital of Sis. Prince Toros I invited people to head the construction, including Gevorg Meghrik Vaspurakantsi (Armenian: Գևորգ Մեղրիկ Վասպուրականցի, George Meghrik from Vaspurakan) and Kirakos Gitnakan (Armenian: Կիրակոս Գիտնական, Kirakos the Learned). At the request of the prince, these men remained there and, between 1050 and 1121 AD, launched an extravagant educational program, created and copied numerous manuscripts for the monks' brotherhood, and developed regulations whereby the monks must be occupied by reading and copying manuscripts. They edited the "Apostles' Acts" (Armenian: Գործք առաքելոց) after translating them from Greek, interpreted St. John's Gospel (Armenian: Հովհաննեսի Ավետարան), completed the volumes Book of Feasts (Armenian: Տոնական գիրք) and Lectionary (Armenian: Ճաշոց գիրք), and translated several codices and testimonies. In 1114 after the death of Archimandrite Gevorg Meghrik, Kirakos Gitnakan was elected the monastery's new archimandrite. Years later, Archimandrite Barseh, a person endowed with special privileges, headed the monastery, followed by Archimandrite Samuel (1178–1181). Drazark monastery's archbishop of Sis, Hovannes (1198–1219), attended the coronation of King Levon I. Many notable personalities of the time thrived in Drazark monastery, such as Vardan Aygektsi, Arakel Hnazandents, Barseh Gitnavor, and Konstantin Lambronatsi, in whose time the monastery became a target for enemies (1305).

Drazark monastery was famed for its high level of education in music and languages, though it always encouraged overall development in its pupils. Toros P'ilisop'a (the Philosopher) and Hovsep Yerazhisht headed the monastic musicians, and various masters of medieval written language studied within the monastery's walls, including Hovhannes Arqayeghbayr (1220–1289, Bishop John of Sis, younger brother of King Hetum I), as well as Sargis Pitsak. The monastery also trained diplomats for the Armenian Kingdom of Cilicia, such as Toros Philosopher, who was subsequently a statesman and ambassador of Cilician Armenia at the time of Levon II (1269–89) and Hetum II (1289–1307) to the kingdom of England. The monastery of Drazark continued to function even after the demise of Cilician Armenia and during the dark period of the Seljukid and Ottoman rule over Cilician Armenians during the next several centuries. At the time of the Cilician Massacre in 1909, Turks plundered the monastery and murdered its priests. The monastery ceased to exist entirely a few years later during the Armenian genocide (1914–1923), sharing the fate of millions of Armenians who fell victim to Turks.

== People buried in the monastic cemetery ==
1. Thoros I, Prince of Armenia
2. Thoros II, Prince of Armenia
3. Thoros III, King of Armenia
4. Ruben III, Prince of Armenia
5. King Hetum I
6. Queen Zabel
7. Catholicos Grigor IV Son
8. Catholicos Grigor V K'aravehz
9. Catholicos Konstantin I Bardzraberdtsi
10. Catholicos Konstantin IV Lambronatsi
11. Sargis Pitsak
12. Gevorg Meghrik

== Current condition ==
The remains of Drazark monastery, especially its main church of Surb Astvatzatzin (Holy Mother of God), were still known to exist in 1930, but fell from memory as the Armenian population in the area was killed or deported. In 1981 the American archaeologist Robert W. Edwards discovered the ruins of an extensive medieval monastery and one surviving church of Armenian construction, located approximately 45 km WNW of Sis (Kozan) and known today as Sara Çiçek (“yellow flower”), which he tentatively identified as Drazark. The unexcavated church, which reveals a plan similar to the barrel-vaulted chapels of Greater Armenia, has a lower level with a conspicuous south entrance leading to a small reception area and possibly crypts.

The exact location of Drazark was established by Samvel Grigoryan in 2015. Samvel Grigoryan is the author of the first article on this topic published in May 2017 « The location of Drazark, burial place of the kings and queens of Armenia and of the 'blessed Rubenians' », Handes Amsorya, Vienne – Erevan 2017, p. 61-84.. In 2015 at the Turkish village of Kibrislar, located approximately 40 km NNW of Sis, Jirair Christianian surveyed online the medieval Armenian church (now converted into a mosque) and concluded very plausibly that this site was the monastic complex of Drazark (this statement is not true). (J. Christian titled his article "The Discovery of the Medieval Armenian Monastery of Drazark...", although the monastery was discovered several years before the publication of his article by S. Grigoryan who had established the exact location of Drazark). Today, only a two-story church-mausoleum remains of the extensive complex of Drazark. This structure most likely is the Holy Mother of God church, which housed in its lower floor the mausoleum where kings, queens, princes, as well as catholicoi and bishops of the church were buried. The remains of Drazark exhibit the largest surviving assemblage of medieval Armenian sculptural elements in Cilicia, including a pair of monumental khatchkars, large sculpted stone crosses mounted in the upper story ashlar masonry of the church's west façade, and an ogee arch with framing colonnettes and bordering geometric designs. Inside the church many niches line the walls, attesting to a rich collection of relics. The expansion of the upper story church and its sculptural decorations were likely added during the reigns of King Het‛um I and his wife Queen Zapēl, or their son King Levon II and his wife Queen Keran, as both couples were devout patrons of the Church, and based on architectural parallels of the mid-13th century.

== Cultural heritage from Drazark that reached our days ==
However, the Matenadaran institute (repository of ancient Armenian manuscripts) in Yerevan has a collection containing over 40 handwritten books made at Drazark monastery. They are written partially at a parchment and decorated by miniature paintings done by hands of medieval authors of gilded paint with wide use of Vordan Karmir. In addition some of the manuscripts that was created in Drazark stored today in Matenadaran institute under the numbers: 154, 199, 1576, 3792, 3845, 3929, 5736, 6290, 10524. There is a Bibles, interpretations, motet writings, tutorials on natural sciences, the oldest copy of famous "Book of Lamentations" by Grigor Narekatsi and so on.
