= Crusader raids on the Red Sea =

12th-century maritime military action

Crusader raids on the Red Sea (1182–1183)
- Part of the Crusades
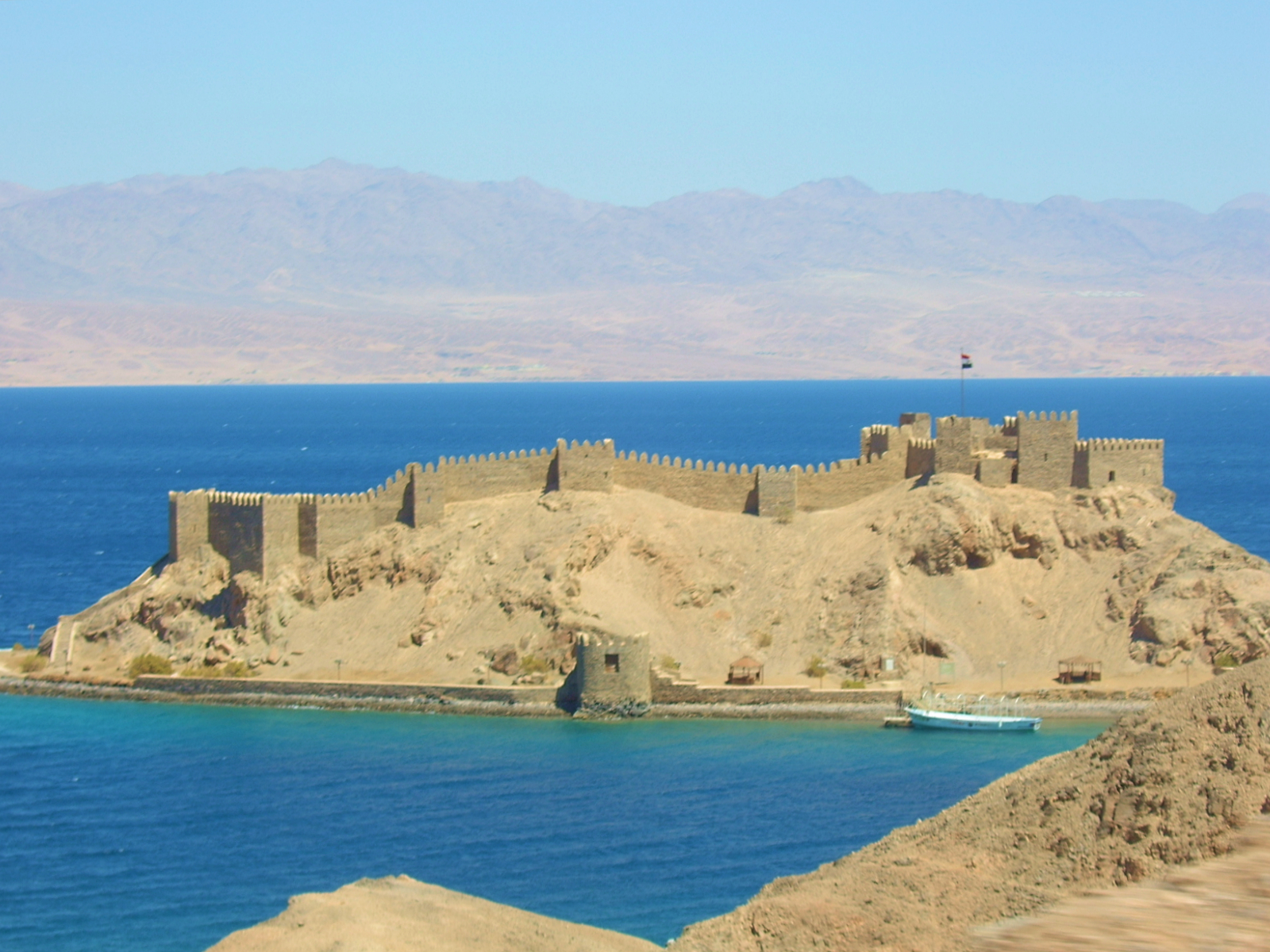
- Ile de Graye, which was blockaded by Raynald of Châtillon's ships.
Date	December 1182 – February 1183
Location	Red Sea & Gulf of Aqaba
Result	Ayyubid victory

Belligerents
Lordship of Transjordan	Ayyubid Dynasty

Commanders and leaders
Raynald of Châtillon	Al-Adil; Husam al-Din Lu'Lu'

Strength
5 ships 300 men	Unknown

Casualties and losses
Destruction of the entire force	Unknown
- 16 merchant ships burned or captured Caravans massacred and ports sacked

The lord of Transjordan, Raynald of Châtillon, constructed a flotilla and launched raids on the Red Sea. He attacked Pharaoh's Island and Muslim ships.

== Background ==
In the year 1182, while the Ayyubid sultan Saladin was campaigning in Iraq, the crusader forces launched raids surrounding Damascus and Bosra. To the south, the lord of Transjordan, Raynald of Châtillon, prepared for an unexpected attack. He began constructing 5 galleys and moving them from Kerak to the Gulf of Aqaba using camels from late 1182 to early 1183. According to a letter of Saladin, it had taken Raynald 2 years to construct this flotilla. He also hired Arab mercenaries to guide his flotilla. The total force was about 300 men.

== Raids ==
Raynald divided his fleet, with two ships blockading the Pharaoh's Island and the rest to attack Muslim shipping in the Red Sea. In the Muslim world, the news of this raid was received with shock and caused outrage. For the next three weeks, the crusader fleet wreaked havoc upon the unsuspecting ports of Egypt and Arabia, harassing pilgrims and merchants and threatening Islam’s spiritual heartland, the sacred cities of Mecca and Medina. The crusaders managed to capture and burn some 16 merchant ships. They also managed to capture a pilgrim ship and destroyed two merchant ships from Aden. They went ashore, set fire to stores of food on the beach that were bound for Makkah and Madinah, and captured a rich trade caravan, killing all its people. These raids created fear in Mecca.

News of these raids arrived in Egypt. Saladin's brother and governor of Egypt, Al-Adil, ordered warships to be transported from Cairo to the Red Sea. The Ayyubid fleet was commanded by Husam al-Din Lu'lu'. The Ayyubids first sailed to the Gulf of Aqaba, where they managed to break the blockade and destroy the two Crusader galleys. Raynald was forced to abandon the land siege and escape to Kerak. The Ayyubids then hunted down the rest of the Crusader galleys. The Ayyubids spotted the Crusaders at Al-Hawra, a one-day march from Medina, and pinned them down at the harbor. The crusaders realized they had no chance against them and escaped inland, abandoning their ships, captives, and loot.

The Ayyubids chased them and overtook them on the fifth day of their march. Many Crusaders were killed, and the rest, numbering 170, were captured, which probably happened in the month of Shawwal (28 January-26 February 1183). Al-Adil wrote to inform Saladin of what had happened, and Saladin ordered that all the prisoners should be executed, as they had knowledge of the Red Sea routes. The Crusader captives were divided and sent to different cities in the Ayyubid realm to be executed publicly.

== Sources ==
- Thomas Asbridge (2011), The Crusades: The Authoritative History of the War for the Holy Land.
- Bernard Hamilton (2000), The Leper King And His Heirs.
- Facey, W. (2005). "Crusaders in the Red Sea: Renaud de Chatillon's Raids of AD 1182–3". In Janet C.M. Starkey (ed.). People of the Red Sea: Proceedings of the Red Sea Project II. BAR International Series no. 1395. Oxford: Archaeopress. pp. 87–98.
