= Ruben III =

Roupen III Ռուբեն Գ
- Lord of Cilicia

Lord of Armenian Cilicia
- Reign: 1175–1187
- Predecessor: Mleh I
- Successor: Leo II
- Born: 1145
- Died: May 6, 1187 (aged 41–42); Drazark monastery
- Burial: Drazark monastery
- Spouse: Isabella of Toron
- Issue: Alix; Philippa
- House: Roupenians
- Father: Stephen
- Mother: Rita of Barbaron

Ruben III (Armenian: Ռուբեն Գ), also Roupen III, Rupen III, or Reuben III, (1145 – Monastery of Drazark, May 6, 1187) was the ninth lord of Armenian Cilicia (1175–1187).

== His life ==
He was the eldest son of Stephen, the third son of Leo I, lord of Armenian Cilicia. His mother was Rita, a daughter of Sempad, Lord of Barbaron. Roupen's father was murdered on February 7, 1165.

Roupen was in charge of Cilicia following the murder of his paternal uncle, Mleh on May 15, 1175.

He was an excellent prince, compassionate and kind; he ruled the country very well, and was praised by everybody.

— Vahram of Edessa: The Rhymed Chronicle of Armenia Minor

On 4 February 1181/3 February 1182 he married Isabella of Toron, daughter of Humphrey III of Toron. Before Roupen's 1188 death, Levon became the new ruler.

On his return to his own country Rouben was kind and humane to every one, and at his death left the crown to Leon; he gave him many rules concerning the government of the country, and committed to him his daughters, with an injunction not to give them foreign husbands, that the Armenians might not be governed by foreigners and harassed by a tyrant.

— Vahram of Edessa: The Rhymed Chronicle of Armenia Minor

== Marriage and children ==
# (4 February 1181 – 3 February 1182) Isabella of Toron, a daughter of Humphrey III of Toron and Stephanie of Milly

- Alice (1182 – after 1234), the wife firstly of Hethum of Sassoun, secondly of Count Raymond IV of Tripoli, and thirdly of Vahram of Korikos
- Philippa (1183 – before 1219), the wife firstly of Shahanshah of Sassoun, and secondly of Theodore I Laskaris, emperor of Nicaea

== Sources ==
- Gibb, Sir Hamilton A. R. (1969) [1955]. "The Rise of Saladin, 1169–1189". In Setton, Kenneth M.; Baldwin, Marshall W. (eds.). A History of the Crusades, Volume I: The First Hundred Years (Second ed.). Madison, Milwaukee, and London: University of Wisconsin Press. ISBN 0-299-04834-9.
- Ghazarian, Jacob G: The Armenian Kingdom in Cilicia during the Crusades: The Integration of Cilician Armenians with the Latins (1080–1393); RoutledgeCurzon (Taylor & Francis Group), 2000, Abingdon; ISBN 0-7007-1418-9
- Runciman, Steven (1952). A History of the Crusades, Volume II: The Kingdom of Jerusalem and the Frankish East. Cambridge: Cambridge University Press.

Ruben III House of Roupen
Regnal titles
Preceded by Mleh I	Lord of Armenian Cilicia; 1175–1187	Succeeded by Leo II
