= Sibylla of Jerusalem =

Queen of Jerusalem from 1186 to 1190

Sibylla
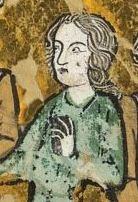
- Detail of a 13th-century miniature

Queen of Jerusalem
- Reign: 1186 – 1190
- Predecessor: Baldwin V
- Successor: Isabella I
- Co-ruler: Guy
- Born: c. 1159; Kingdom of Jerusalem
- Died: 25 July 1190 (aged 30–31); Acre
- Spouses: William Longsword of Montferrat (m. 1176; died 1177) Guy of Lusignan (m. 1180)
- Issue: Baldwin V
- House: House of Anjou
- Father: Amalric of Jerusalem
- Mother: Agnes of Courtenay
- Religion: Roman Catholicism

Sibylla (Old French: Sibyl; c. 1159 – 1190) was the queen of Jerusalem from 1186 until her death in 1190. She reigned alongside her husband Guy of Lusignan, whom she continued to support despite his unpopularity among the barons of the Kingdom of Jerusalem.

Sibylla was the eldest daughter of King Amalric and the only daughter of his first wife, Agnes of Courtenay. Her father died in 1174, making her heir presumptive to her younger brother, King Baldwin IV; when it became clear that the 13-year-old king had contracted leprosy, the matter of Sibylla's marriage became urgent. The regent, Count Raymond III of Tripoli, arranged for her to marry William Longsword of Montferrat in late 1176, but within a year, William died, leaving her pregnant and in possession of the County of Jaffa and Ascalon.

Shortly after giving birth to a son, Baldwin, Sibylla came to be associated with her brother in public acts, thereby being designated as next in line to the throne. Sibylla's brother arranged her second marriage to Guy of Lusignan in 1180, likely to foil a coup planned by Raymond III of Tripoli and Bohemond III of Antioch. The couple had four daughters, but their marriage deeply divided the nobility. By 1183, King Baldwin had become completely incapacitated by his disease as well as disillusioned with Guy's character and inability to lead. To prevent Guy's accession to the throne, Baldwin had Sibylla's son crowned as co-king and attempted to separate Sibylla from Guy, but the couple refused to show up at court.

Baldwin IV died in 1185, having named Raymond to rule as regent for Baldwin V instead of Sibylla or Guy. The boy king died the next year, and Sibylla moved quickly to claim the throne against Raymond's ambitions. She agreed to her supporters' demand to set Guy aside on the condition that she could choose her next husband, and outwitted them at her coronation in mid-September 1186 by choosing to remarry Guy and crown him herself. Saladin took advantage of the discord in the kingdom to invade in 1187, reducing the Kingdom of Jerusalem to a single city, Tyre. Sibylla visited her husband, who had been taken captive at the decisive Battle of Hattin, and procured from Saladin his release. While Guy was besieging Acre, Sibylla and their daughters died in 1190 of an epidemic outside Acre.

== Childhood ==
Sibylla was the elder of the two children of the count of Jaffa and Ascalon, Amalric, and his first wife, Agnes of Courtenay. Sibylla was born between 1157, when her parents married, and 1161, when her younger brother, Baldwin, was born. Her paternal uncle was the then-reigning king of Jerusalem, Baldwin III, and her paternal grandmother was Queen Melisende, the first female ruler of the Kingdom of Jerusalem. The ruling class of the kingdom and other crusader states, called the Franks, were French-speaking Catholics who had arrived in the Levant from Western Europe and remained Western in culture. Sibylla was named after the countess of Flanders, her father's half-sister and her godmother.

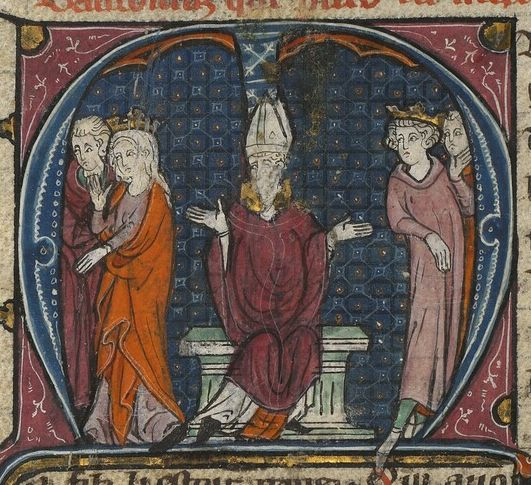
The annulment of the marriage of Agnes (left) and Amalric (right)

When King Baldwin III died in 1163, the High Court forced Amalric to agree to an annulment of his marriage to Agnes to be accepted as the new king. After their marriage was annulled, Amalric succeeded in having Pope Alexander III declare their children declared legitimate. As there was no longer a queen's household in the King's court until his marriage to Maria Komnene in 1167, it was unsuitable for the four-year-old Sibylla. In common with Western practices, Sibylla moved to the Convent of Saint Lazarus near Jerusalem to be educated by the King's aunt, Abbess Ioveta, Queen Melisende's youngest sister; Sibylla's godmother, Countess Sibylla of Flanders, was also there as a nun, having become one in 1159. She consequently had little contact with her mother or brother, who was heir apparent to their father. With his second wife, Maria Komnene, the King had two daughters, of whom only Isabella survived infancy.

A convent was not only the usual place for a noblewoman like Sibylla to receive her education, but the best one; it was not only a learning center for women, but also protected Sibylla from forced marriage or abduction. As a student at the abbey, Sibylla would have learned what was expected of any aristocratic woman at this time. She would have learned about the Christian faith, how to read and write in Old French and Latin, and women's skills such as spinning, embroidery, and singing. She would also learn how to hunt with a hawk, or even how to handle a bow.

King Amalric feared that, like his brother and their father, King Fulk, he too would die young, before his heir reached the age of majority. Having no close male relative who could rule as regent on his son's behalf if the latter ascended as a minor, Amalric authorized the archbishop of Tyre, Frederick de la Roche, in 1169 to find a husband for Sibylla in Western Europe. This candidate had to be an older man of high enough rank and with enough experience in government who was not related to Sibylla within the Church's forbidden degrees. Amalric chose Count Stephen I of Sancerre, the brother-in-law of King Louis VII of France and a relative of the English royal house. Stephen came to Jerusalem in 1171, joined by other important noblemen, including his nephew Hugh III of Burgundy, who was later offered Sibylla's hand in marriage. The chronicler William of Tyre described Stephen as "a man noble in flesh, but not so behavior" Sibylla's brother was suspected of having contracted leprosy, then an incurable disease that would prevent him from marrying and having children, so Amalric therefore saw Sibylla and Stephen as eventual monarchs instead of his son. However, Stephen rejected the match for unknown reasons, returning to his own lands after a few months.

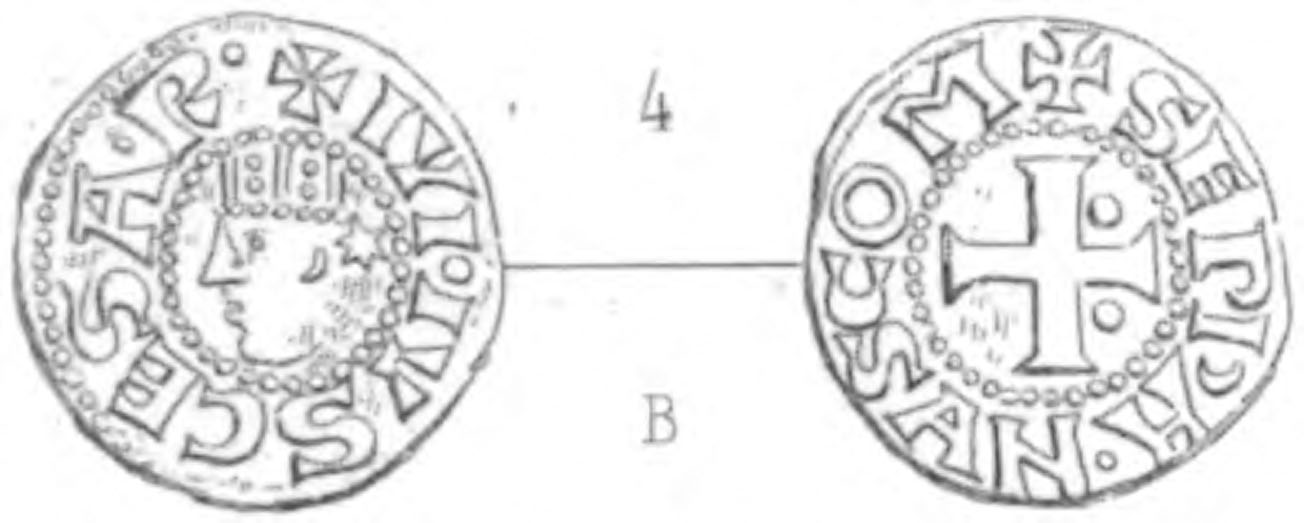
Coin depicting Stephen I of Sancerre

While it is unknown why Stephen backed out of the arrangement "disgracefully and foully", it is possible that he and Amalric could not agree on what power he would hold as Sibylla's husband. As Amalric already had a son, Baldwin, and could have still had a healthy son with his wife Maria at this time, Stephen realized that he was not guaranteed to inherit anything. It is also possible that Stephen, knowing of Agnes and Amalric's annulment, grew to worry about Sibylla's legitimacy.

== Heir presumptive ==
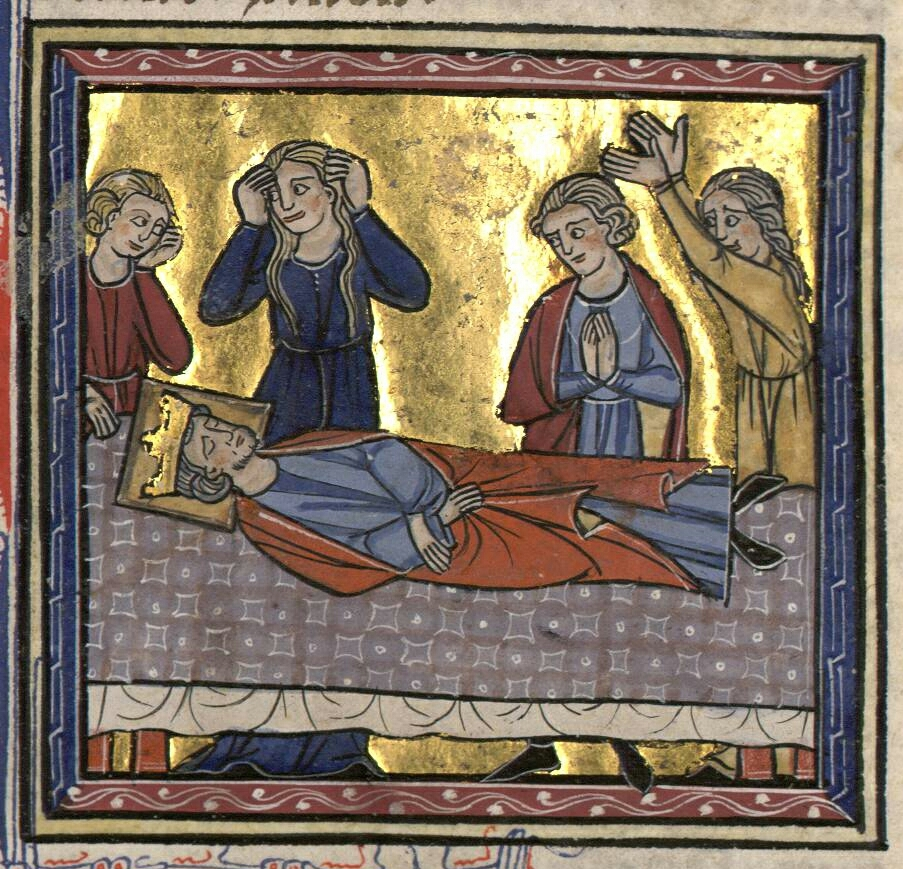
Death of King Amalric as depicted in the 13th century

When King Amalric died of dysentery on 11 July 1174, the High Court met to discuss who should succeed him. Sibylla's 13-year-old brother, Baldwin, would have been the obvious successor had there not been fears of his incipient leprosy. The only serious alternative to him was Sibylla, then aged about 15. Female succession had been grounded in recent law and had precedent, as Sibylla's grandmother Melisende preceded her sons on the throne. However, Sibylla was young, inexperienced, and unmarried. No bachelor in the Latin East was fit to marry her; Count Raymond III of Tripoli and Baldwin of Antioch were too closely related, and a marriage to one of the barons in the kingdom could have caused resentment among the others. A match had to be found abroad, but since that would have taken too long, Baldwin IV was chosen with the expectation that a husband would be found for Sibylla to succeed him if he proved to be affected.

=== Marriage ===
Count Raymond of Tripoli, who was by then also prince of Galilee in the Kingdom of Jerusalem, became regent for the young king on the basis of being the nearest male relative. He allowed Sibylla and Baldwin's mother, Agnes, to return to court, and Agnes had strong attachment to and influence on her children in the following years. Baldwin's condition deteriorated rapidly after his accession, and since it was clear that he had leprosy, it became imperative to arrange a marriage for Sibylla. The groom chosen by Raymond and the High Court was William "Longsword" of Montferrat, son of Marquis William V of Montferrat and cousin of both Holy Roman Emperor Frederick Barbarossa and King Louis VII of France. Additionally, William V took part in the Second Crusade, displaying his family's dedication to the Kingdom of Jerusalem.

William arrived in the East in October 1176; by that time, the barons of the Kingdom of Jerusalem were no longer so well disposed towards him, likely because Emperor Frederick had suffered military setbacks against the Lombard League and could no longer be expected to aid the Catholics in the East. William of Tyre reported that William Longsword's marriage to Sibylla was "unwelcome to and openly opposed by certain of those men by whose advice he had been summoned." The marriage had to go forward, however, because Sibylla's prospects could irreparably diminish if she were to be jilted again. According to William of Tyre, William Longsword became Sibylla's husband in November, just forty days after his arrival, as Baldwin and Sibylla had sworn on oath the previous year. William was subsequently granted the County of Jaffa and Ascalon, making Sibylla the only countess in the kingdom besides her mother, who had been granted the title after her annulment, which conferred a certain distinction. Baldwin may have offered to abdicate in William's favour, but William declined because he knew he lacked support among the nobility. Regardless, Sibylla and William appeared to have a stable future together, and could easily take authority if required.

=== Countess ===
Map of the fiefs in the Kingdom of Jerusalem

Around April 1177, shortly after he and Sibylla conceived a child, William fell critically ill; when Baldwin came to visit his brother-in-law, he fell gravely ill too. William died in June, by which time Sibylla's pregnancy was known, and she was left as the suo jure countess of Jaffa and Ascalon. William's death left his contemporaries dismayed, with many suspecting that he had been murdered. William of Tyre made little note of it, implying that his intemperate lifestyle and excessive eating and drinking led to his death.

Sibylla and Baldwin's first cousin Count Philip I of Flanders arrived in Jerusalem soon after William's death, but declined regency when the King, who was still terribly ill, hastily and eagerly offered it to him. Rather, one of Philip's major goals was to arrange for Sibylla and her half-sister Isabella to marry Robert and William, respectively, sons of his favourite liegeman Robert V of Béthune. Presumably, Philip wanted these men to surrender their lands in Flanders to him and take over the Kingdom of Jerusalem. Immediately recognizing Philip's attempt to undermine Baldwin's authority, the High Court countered that custom entitled the widowed Sibylla to a year of mourning, which was especially seemly given her pregnancy. Philip and the High Court could not agree on which of them had the final say in choosing Sibylla's next husband. The lord of Ramla, Baldwin of Ibelin, led the opposition to Philip and hoped to be the chosen suitor.

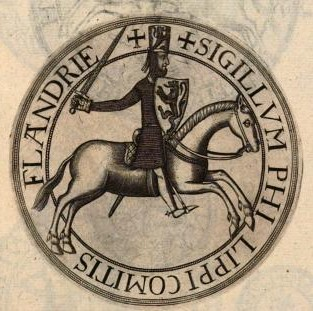
Seal of Philip I of Flanders

Sibylla gave birth to a son, named Baldwin, in the winter of 1177–78. The boy was named after his maternal uncle, indicating that he was to become his heir. Her mourning period ended in June 1178, and it became appropriate to negotiate a new marriage for her. Baldwin of Ibelin's suit was well known, but rejected; his brother Balian was allowed to marry Sibylla's stepmother, Queen Maria, in late 1177. On 1 July 1178, Sibylla began to be associated with her brother in public acts, and he therefore acknowledged her as next in line for the throne. This was reminiscent of their grandmother Melisende's association with her father, King Baldwin II. Baldwin IV thus confirmed Sibylla's status as his heir presumptive.

The High Court agreed unanimously that Sibylla should next marry Duke Hugh III of Burgundy; according to William of Tyre, they said "that we should concede to him in matrimony the lord king's sister, whom first the marquis (of Montferrat) had had, on the same conditions." Baldwin IV so desperately wanted a brother-in-law to take over the kingdom for him that he empowered the king of France to choose an alternative candidate if Hugh refused. However, unlike Stephen, Hugh would not become Baldwin IV's direct heir to the throne since Sibylla now had a son. Hugh intended to sail to the East in early 1180 and marry Sibylla at Easter. A group of crusaders from France, led by Count Henry I of Champagne, Peter I of Courtenay, and Philip of Dreux, arrived in July 1179, but they failed to prevent the Egyptian ruler Saladin from destroying the crusader fortress of Le Chastellet. Regardless, they remained in the kingdom in the hopes of assisting at Sibylla and Hugh's coronation the following year. However, Hugh never set sail, possibly not wishing to leave his young son, Odo, as his regent in Burgundy.

=== Remarriage ===
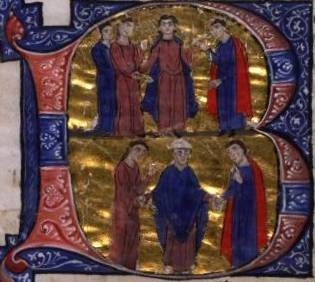
13th-century Acre depiction of Baldwin IV betrothing Sibylla to Guy and Sibylla marrying Guy

Things took an unexpected turn during the Holy Week in 1180. The brewing conflict in France that followed the accession of King Philip II prevented Hugh from leaving his domain. Contemporary chroniclers Ernoul and William of Tyre relate the events differently. According to Ernoul, Sibylla wrote to Baldwin of Ibelin when he was in Saladin's captivity, promising that she would convince her brother to allow their marriage if he could ransom himself, but her mother persuaded her to marry Guy of Lusignan, a Poitevin knight, instead. Historian Bernard Hamilton argues that Ernoul's account, though accepted in older historiography, is biased in favour of the Ibelins.

William of Tyre reports that during the Holy Week in 1180, Count Raymond III of Tripoli and Prince Bohemond III of Antioch were marching towards Jerusalem to stage a coup against King Baldwin. Hamilton concludes that they intended to force the King to have Sibylla marry Baldwin of Ibelin and to then abdicate, and that the King foiled their plan by arranging her marriage to Guy. The marriage took place very quickly; the ceremony was canonically invalid and public notice was not given. King Baldwin had never approved Baldwin of Ibelin, possibly because the Ibelin family had only recently risen to lordly rank. Another factor was that Saladin had been informed by Raymond and Bohemond's conspiracy to enthrone Baldwin of Ibelin and therefore set Baldwin of Ibelin's ransom to that of a king; a successor with such a debt was not desirable.

From 1180, Sibylla held Jaffa and Ascalon with Guy, and had four daughters with him, including Alice and Maria. Their marriage divided the nobility into a faction supporting Guy (Sibylla; the king; their mother, Agnes; their stepfather, Raynald, lord of Sidon; their maternal uncle, Joscelin of Courtenay; and the lord of Oultrejordain, Raynald of Châtillon) and a faction opposing him (Sibylla's paternal kinsmen Bohemond of Antioch and Raymond of Tripoli; Baldwin and Balian of Ibelin; and her stepmother, Maria Komnene). In order to prevent the opposing party from setting up a rival claimant, the King took his mother's advice and, in October 1180, betrothed his and Sibylla's half-sister, Isabella, to Humphrey IV of Toron, stepson of Raynald of Châtillon. From March 1181, both Sibylla and Guy were associated with King Baldwin in public acts.

Sibylla's family, including Guy and his partisans (blue rectangular) and Guy's opponents (red rounded)

Baldwin II of Jerusalem	Morphia of Melitene
Eremburga of Maine	Fulk V of Anjou	Melisende of Jerusalem	Alice of Jerusalem	Hodierna of Jerusalem	Ioveta of Jerusalem
Geoffrey V of Anjou	Sibylla of Anjou	Baldwin III of Jerusalem	Joscelin of Courtenay	Agnes of Courtenay	Amalric of Jerusalem	Maria Komnene	Balian of Ibelin	Stephanie of Milly	Raynald of Châtillon	Constance of Antioch	Raymond III of Tripoli
Henry II of England	Philip I of Flanders	William of Montferrat	Sibylla of Jerusalem	Guy of Lusignan	Baldwin IV of Jerusalem	Isabella I of Jerusalem	Humphrey IV of Toron	Bohemond III of Antioch	Maria of Antioch	Manuel I Komnenos	Baldwin of Antioch
Baldwin V of Jerusalem

== Disinheritance ==
Baldwin IV's leprosy progressed quickly; in 1183 he lost his sight and could no longer walk unsupported or use his hands. Having developed a life-threatening fever, he summoned the High Court in June and made Guy regent. Baldwin retained only the royal title and the city of Jerusalem. Guy proved far too unpopular to be an effective military leader, and gravely insulted the incapacitated king by refusing to exchange Jerusalem for Tyre.

Saladin attacked Kerak Castle in late 1183 while the wedding of Sibylla's half-sister Isabella to Humphrey of Toron was celebrated. Baldwin summoned his troops. Not trusting him to efficiently command the army, the King deprived Guy of regency and, effectively, of his place in the line of succession. The succession was then deliberated by the assembled nobility, which included Guy, Agnes, Bohemond of Antioch, Raymond of Tripoli, Raynald of Sidon, and the Ibelin brothers, but not Sibylla's supporters Raynald of Châtillon and Joscelin of Courtenay. Eventually, Agnes's proposal that Sibylla's five-year-old son, Baldwin V, be crowned co-king was accepted because his was the next strongest claim after Sibylla's. The coronation took place on 20 November, and the boy received the homage of all the barons except his stepfather, who was not invited. Sibylla most likely agreed to this coronation and accepted the fact that she would not be her son's regent. Baldwin IV and his army then relieved the siege of Kerak.

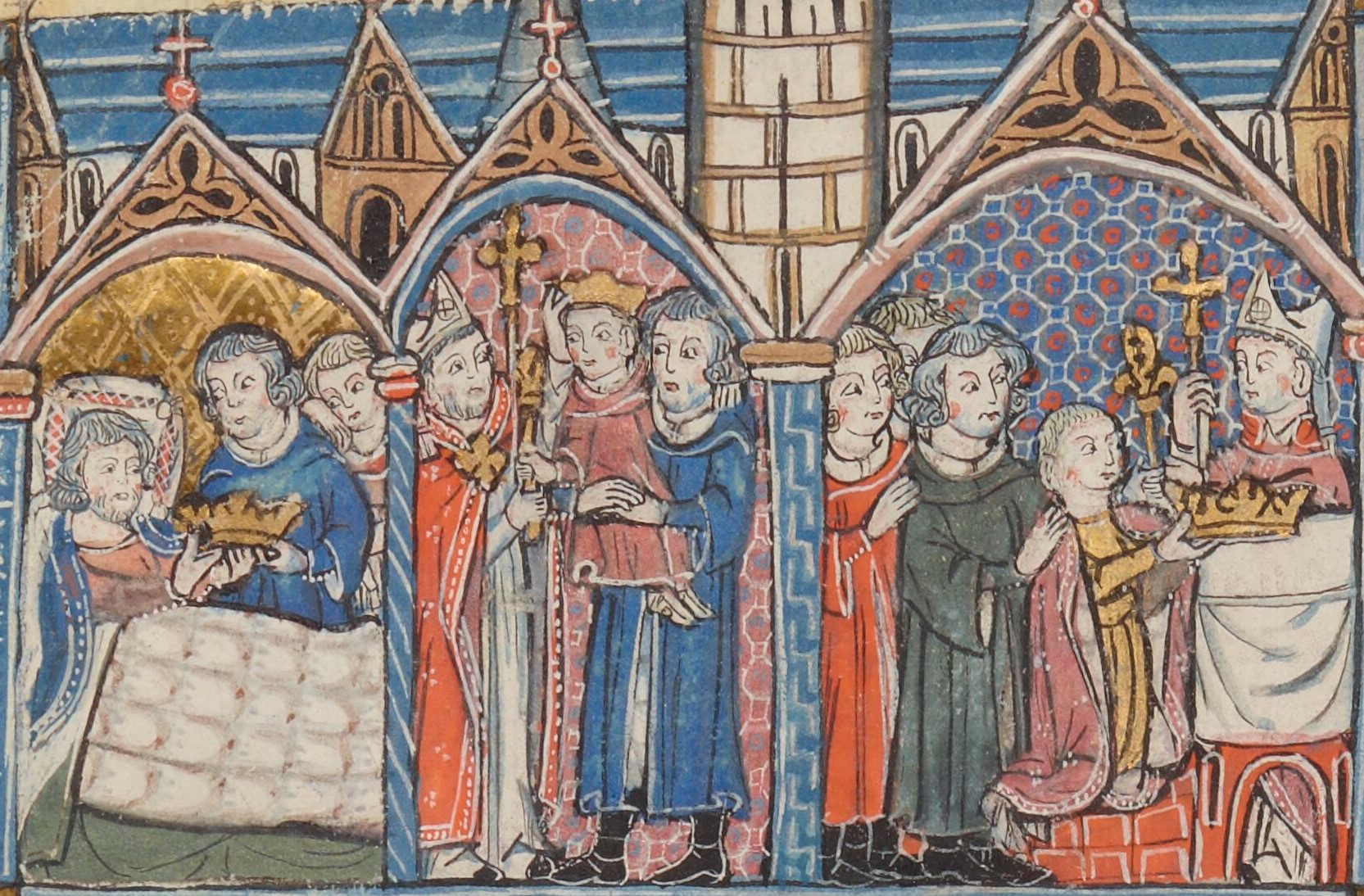
Death of Baldwin IV, coronation of Baldwin V, and nomination of Raymond to regency as depicted in Acre in the 13th century

The question of who would rule the kingdom as regent for Baldwin V troubled the disabled king. Sibylla and Guy would have the best claim to regency if Baldwin IV died. Her brother knew that this could only be prevented by having their marriage annulled and discussed the matter with the Latin patriarch of Jerusalem, Heraclius. Baldwin failed to take into account Sibylla's steadfast devotion to Guy as well as Guy's friendship with Heraclius, who may have warned Guy about Baldwin's intentions. Instead of going to Jerusalem with the rest of the army after lifting the siege of Kerak, Guy went straight to Ascalon and sent a message to Sibylla, who joined him there. The annulment could not proceed without their presence, and the couple's refusal to leave Ascalon despite Baldwin's summons frustrated the scheme to separate them. Baldwin next attempted to confiscate Jaffa and Ascalon but only succeeded in revoking Jaffa.

On Baldwin IV's deathbed in early 1185, the right to rule the kingdom as regent in the name of Baldwin V, then a sickly child, was offered to Raymond of Tripoli. Raymond accepted the regency on the condition that the pope should, on the advice of the Holy Roman emperor and the kings of England and France, decide whether the crown should pass to Sibylla or Isabella in case of Baldwin V's premature death. The High Court accepted the conditions and swore an oath to him in the presence of Baldwin IV. Guardianship of the boy was awarded to his granduncle Joscelin of Courtenay, and they lived in Acre. Raymond's party was determined to prevent Sibylla's accession; they questioned her legitimacy on the basis of the annulment of her parents' marriage and emphasized that Isabella was born to a reigning king. The latter argument, resting on the Byzantine idea of being "born in the purple", may have come from Isabella's Byzantine mother, Maria Komnene. Baldwin IV died in March 1185 or before 16 May 1185 at the latest, when Baldwin V is recorded as the sole king. Baldwin V's paternal grandfather, Marquis William V of Montferrat, arrived in Jerusalem to safeguard the young king's rights.

== Reign ==
=== Accession ===
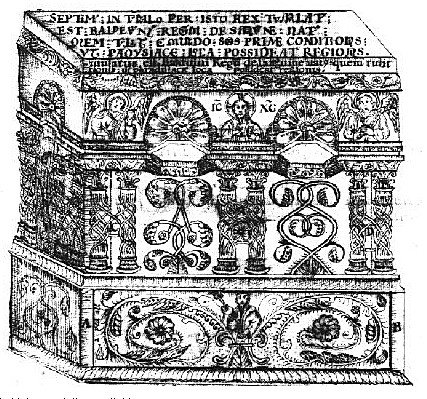
The elaborate tomb commissioned by Sibylla for her son, Baldwin V

Sibylla's son died in Acre in August 1186. Sibylla hurried to Jerusalem to attend her son's funeral. She and Guy garrisoned the city with their strong armed escort. Sibylla's mother had died by then too. Sibylla commissioned an elaborate tomb for her son, as it was the duty of noblewomen at this time to ensure the commemoration of their husbands and children.

Raymond summoned the High Court to Nablus. Sibylla's half-sister, Isabella, attended with her husband Humphrey and her stepfamily, the Ibelins, as likely did Raymond's stepsons, Hugh, William, Ralph, and Odo of Saint Omer. Contemporaries believed that Raymond intended to claim the throne for himself. Meanwhile, Sibylla's uncle Joscelin of Courtenay took possession of Acre and Beirut in her name.

Raymond underestimated the support for Sibylla. Raynald of Châtillon and William V of Montferrat came to Sibylla's side. She was also backed by the patriarch and the Master of the Knights Templar, Gerard of Ridefort, who both resided in Jerusalem, as well as by the constable, Guy's brother Aimery; the chancellor, Peter of Lydda; and the seneschal, her uncle Joscelin. The nobility and clergy assembled in Jerusalem wished to settle the succession immediately. They concurred that Sibylla had the best claim, but disagreed on whether Guy should become king alongside her. In the end, Sibylla's supporters required her to leave Guy in return for their recognition of her rights. Sibylla agreed to divorce Guy on three conditions: the legitimisation of her daughters by Guy, Guy's retention of Jaffa and Ascalon, and the freedom to choose a new husband as she saw fit. The conditions were accepted.

=== Coronation ===
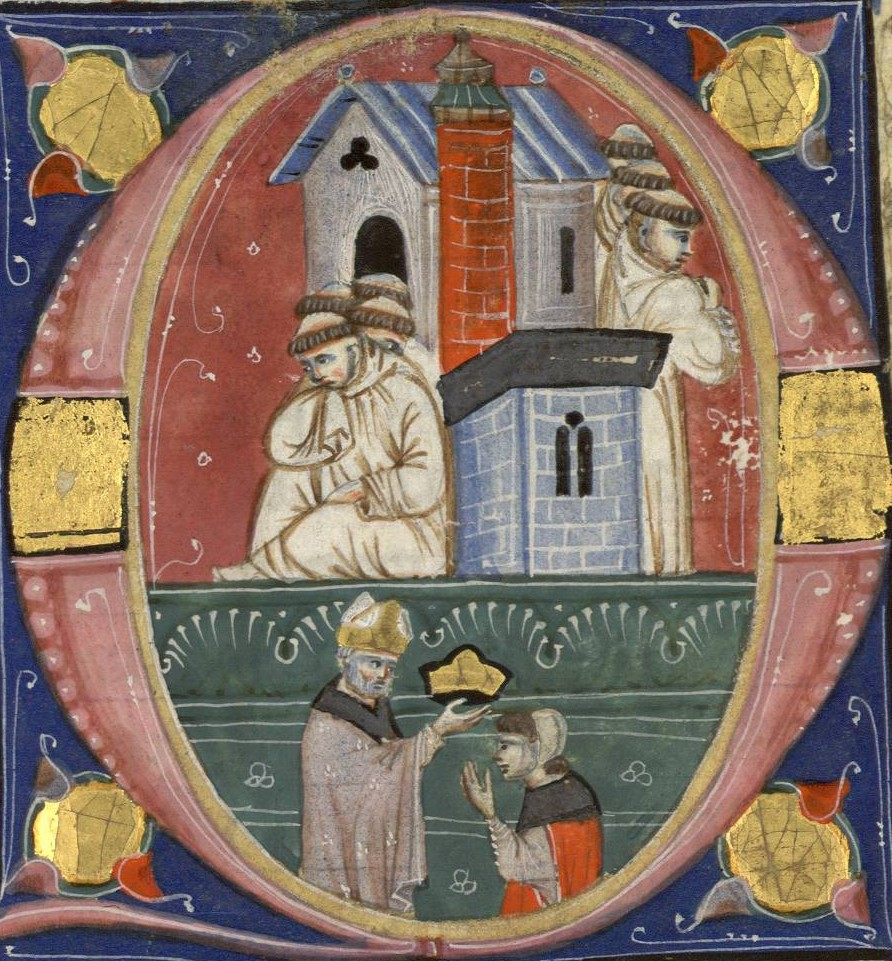
Sibylla crowned by Heraclius while monks sent from Nablus spy on them

On the advice of Heraclius and Gerard, Sibylla summoned the lords to attend her coronation. Possibly in an attempt to appease Raymond and his party, Guy was not mentioned in the summons; Sibylla proclaimed that the kingdom had passed to her by right of inheritance. Raymond's party nevertheless refused to attend, arguing that doing so would violate the oaths taken at Baldwin IV's deathbed, and went so far as to send a delegation of monks to forbid the coronation. The master of the Knights Hospitaller, Roger des Moulins, also declined to be present, more likely due to the oath than out of any opposition to Sibylla. He was nevertheless persuaded to surrender his key to the chest containing regalia. The city gates were barred ahead of the coronation to prevent disruption by the opposing party, and instead of by the attendees, Sibylla was acclaimed queen by the citizens of Jerusalem at the urging of Raynald of Châtillon.

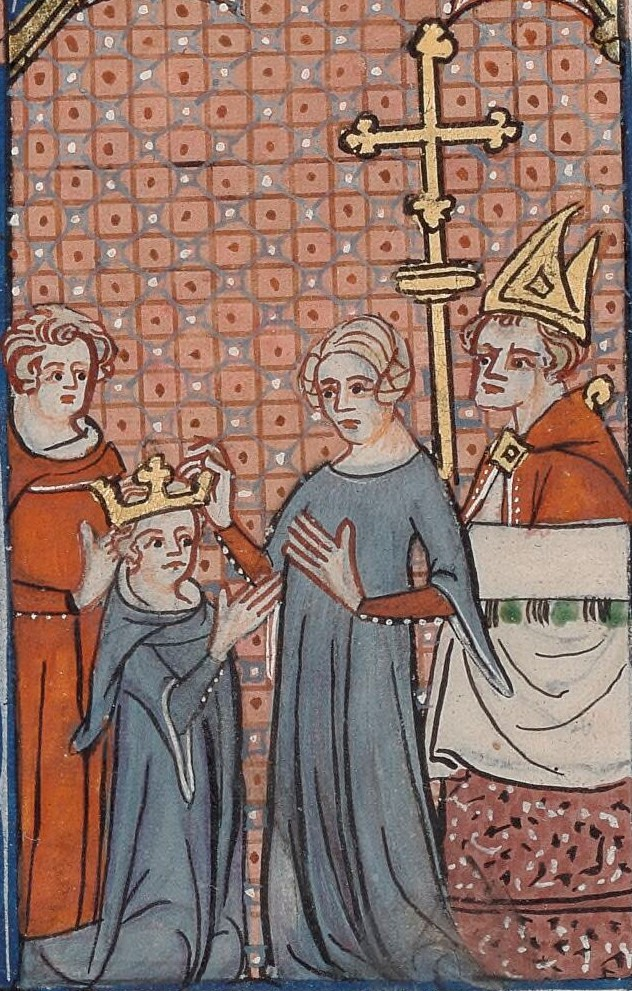
After she was crowned by the patriarch, Sibylla called Guy and crowned him king.

As was traditional, the coronation was held at the Church of the Holy Sepulchre, likely in mid-September. After crowning her, the patriarch gave a second crown to Sibylla and asked her to choose a new consort. She astonished the attendees by calling forth Guy and placing the crown on his head. However, there is no mention of Sibylla and Guy being anointed, which would have been customary at the time. Having agreed that she should choose a husband after setting Guy aside, the assembled noblemen could raise no objection to her choice. Upon hearing about this turn of events, Raymond proposed crowning Isabella and Humphrey as rival monarchs, but Humphrey sneaked out of Nablus at night and rode to Jerusalem. Upon arrival, he demanded an audience with the Queen, who agreed after initial reluctance. He swore fealty to her, and she took him to see Guy, to whom he paid homage. Roger des Moulins and Heraclius mediated peace, and all the barons except Raymond of Tripoli and Baldwin of Ibelin came to Jerusalem to submit.

=== Fall of Jerusalem ===
Sibylla was well-positioned to wield power because Guy's authority was entirely dependent on her. She was associated with her husband in public acts in the first months of their reign, but this was cut short by Saladin's invasion. In an act of continued defiance, Raymond had retired to his fief of Galilee, allied with Saladin, and garrisoned Tiberias with Muslim troops. Saladin attacked the kingdom on 26 April 1187. After Muslim troops annihilated the combined armies of the Templars and the Hospitallers at Cresson near Nazareth on 1 May, Raymond was forced by his own vassals to submit to Guy. Though now unified, the kingdom had been critically weakened by the defeat at Cresson. The Christian army led by Guy suffered a crushing defeat at the Horns of Hattin on 4 July. Saladin took Guy prisoner and executed Raynald; Raymond died of an illness in Tripoli in September.

At the time of King Guy's defeat and imprisonment at Hattin, Queen Sibylla was in Jerusalem. She went to Ascalon with her daughters to defend the city and only surrendered it to Saladin in return for Guy's release, but Saladin nevertheless kept him imprisoned. However, none of these appeals for aid were sent in Sibylla's name. In September, Saladin besieged Jerusalem. The Queen commanded the defence with the assistance of Patriarch Heraclius and Balian of Ibelin, but intense bombardment forced them to surrender. Saladin allowed the defeated to ransom themselves, and Sibylla was further permitted to visit Guy in Nablus while she travelled to Antioch. She was apparently prevented from embarking there for Europe when her ship was seized by Conrad of Montferrat, her first husband's brother who had taken up the defence of Tyre. Sibylla instead joined her stepmother, Queen Maria, in Tripoli. In the months following the Battle of Hattin, all of the kingdom except Tyre fell to Saladin.

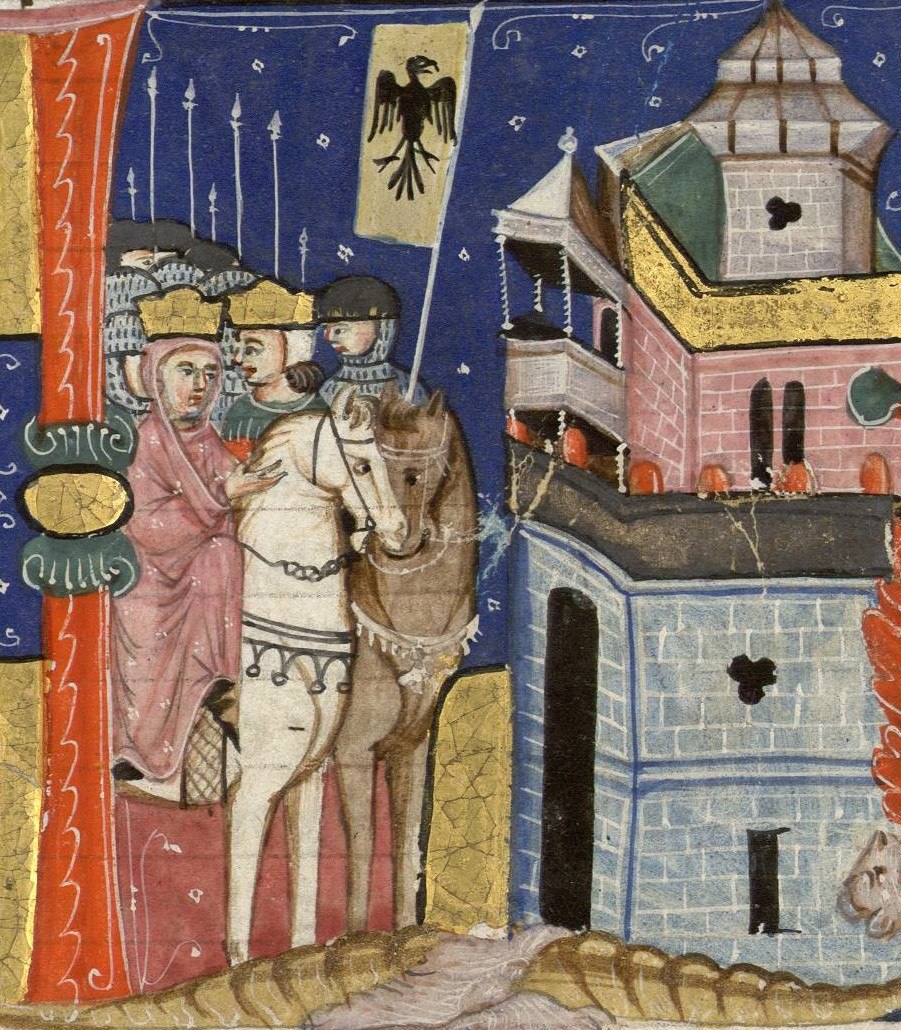
1295 depiction of Guy and Sibylla outside Tyre

Sibylla repeatedly pleaded with Saladin for Guy's release, and Saladin granted her request in July 1188. The couple tearfully reunited on the island of Arwad near Tortosa, from where they went north to Antioch and then back south to Tripoli, gathering an army along the way. They marched to Tyre in April 1189. The city's defender, Conrad, refused to allow the King and Queen into the city, forcing them to spend months outside its walls. Conrad posited that Guy had forfeited the kingdom at Hattin and that Tyre was being held in trust for the Holy Roman emperor and the kings of England and France, who would decide to whom the government should be assigned.

== Death ==
The Third Crusade was launched in 1189, and Sibylla accompanied Guy to the siege of Acre along with Humphrey, Isabella, Maria, and Balian. An epidemic struck the crusaders' camp in 1190. Sibylla died in late summer or autumn along with her daughters Alice and Maria. (Note: Hamilton dates Sibylla's death to 25 July 1190. Nicholson argues that she died between 16 and 21 October.) It is not clear whether the other two daughters had died earlier or at the same time. The Itinerarium recorded accusations of foul play against Guy, but in truth, their deaths deprived Guy of any right to the throne. Sibylla's heir was her half-sister Isabella I.

== Assessment ==
Historian Bernard Hamilton disagrees with Ernoul's characterization of Sibylla as fickle, foolish, and sentimental, arguing that the portrayal "bears little relation to the known facts". Influenced by the prevailing medieval perception of ideal queenship, Sibylla's contemporaries and near-contemporaneous chroniclers were interested more in her relationship with Guy than in her military activity. Standing by her husband won her approval of her contemporaries; Roger of Wendover described her as:

A most praiseworthy woman, to be commended both for her virtue and for her courage. She so arranged matters that the kingdom obtained a ruler while she retained a husband.

Resourcefulness and loyalty remain Sibylla's chief traits in modern historiography, which historian Helen J. Nicholson attributes to the distortion of her image by contemporary gender ideals.

== Popular culture ==
- Kingdom of Heaven – Eva Green portrayed Sibylla as an orientalized princess who loved Balian of Ibelin rather than Guy.
- Kudüs Fatihi Selahaddin Eyyubi - Gülper Özdemir portrayed Sibylla, who hated Guy and loved Balian.

== Notes ==
Titles of nobility
Vacant Merged into royal domain Title last held by Amalric	Countess of Jaffa and Ascalon; 1176-1186 with William of Montferrat (1176-1177); Guy of Lusignan (1180-1186)	Vacant Merged into royal domain Title next held by Geoffrey of Lusignan
Regnal titles
Preceded by Baldwin V	Queen of Jerusalem; 1186-1190 with Guy	Succeeded by Isabella I
