= Eschiva of Bures =

Princess of Galilee from 1158 to 1187

Eschiva of Bures, also known as Eschiva II (Note: The 13th-century Lignages d'Outremer attribute two daughters to Hugh of Falkenberg, an early prince of Galilee. Harry Pirie-Gordon names Eschiva I as the daughter and heir of Hugh and wife of William of Bures and consequently refers to Eschiva of Bures as Eschiva II. Bernard Hamilton and Malcolm Barber also refer to Eschiva of Bures as Eschiva II.) or Eschiva I, (Note: Martin Rheinheimer considers the existence of Hugh's daughters doubtful. He consequently refers to Eschiva of Bures as Eschiva I, with her granddaughter Eschiva of Saint-Omer as Eschiva II.) was the princess of Galilee in the Kingdom of Jerusalem from 1158 to 1187. She inherited the principality and in 1159 married Walter of Saint-Omer, who became prince and the father of her children. In 1174, within months of being widowed, she married Count Raymond III of Tripoli. She governed the principality from the town of Tiberias during Raymond's absence from 1180 to 1182. In the aftermath of the battle of Hattin, she surrendered Tiberias to the Egyptian ruler Saladin.

== Background ==
The Principality of Galilee was the largest fief in the Kingdom of Jerusalem. The principality was centered on the town of Tiberias and is consequently also commonly referred to as the lordship of Tiberias. The kingdom (as well as the other crusader states to its north, including the County of Tripoli) was established by the Franks, the Latin Christians who invaded the Levant and defeated its Muslim rulers during the First Crusade in 1098–99.

The genealogy of the princes of Galilee is disputed. According to Harry Pirie-Gordon's reconstruction, Eschiva was the daughter of Prince Elinand and Ermengarde, who was the sister of Balian and Baldwin of Ibelin and daughter of Helvis of Ramla. Upon Elinand's death, Eschiva was too young to marry, and her fief was administered by Simon, who is presumed to have married her mother, and then by William, Elinand's younger brother. In 1158, William died or ceded the principality to Eschiva. The historian Martin Rheinheimer proposes that Eschiva was the daughter of either Elinand (whom he identifies with Elias, the nephew and sometime heir of William (I) of Bures, prince of Galilee) or of Radulf of Issy (another nephew of Prince William); this would make her either the sister or cousin of her predecessor William (II) of Bures. Rheinheimer's colleague Hans Eberhard Mayer argues instead that Rheinheimer's William I and William II were the same person, and that this William and Ermengarde of Ibelin were Eschiva's parents. According to Mayer, Eschiva inherited the fief when William died in 1158.

== Marriages ==
Eschiva's first husband was Walter of Saint Omer, who received the principality through their marriage. The earliest record of him as the prince of Galilee dates from March 1159. Walter was a relative of Hugh of Falkenberg, an early prince of Galilee. Mayer proposes that King Baldwin III arranged the marriage because he wanted to merge the concurring claims of the Bures and Saint-Omer families to Galilee. Eschiva and Walter had four sons: Hugh, William, Ralph, and Odo.

Walter died in early 1174. His and Eschiva's sons were still minors. Eschiva, the greatest heiress in the kingdom, thus became the most eligible woman too. She soon married Count Raymond III of Tripoli. The historians Bernard Hamilton and Malcolm Barber date Eschiva's marriage to Raymond to the beginning of Raymond's regency on behalf of the young King Baldwin IV, who had succeeded upon the death of King Amalric in July 1174. Lewis points to the account of the contemporaneous chronicler Ernoul, who writes that the marriage was arranged by Amalric. The marriage to Eschiva made Raymond the most powerful baron in the Kingdom of Jerusalem. Eschiva and Raymond did not have any children. The chronicler William of Tyre reports that Raymond was a faithful and loving husband and a dedicated stepfather to Eschiva's children.

== Governance ==
By 1177, Eschiva's sons Hugh and William had reached adulthood. Raymond was apparently absent from Tiberias from 1180 to 1182. The historian Kevin Lewis assumes that Eschiva, her sons, or her constable were left in charge of Tiberias during this time.

Upon the death of King Baldwin V in 1186, Raymond appears to have intended to claim the throne. He was thwarted by the young king's mother, Sibylla, who staged her own coronation and proceeded to crown her husband, Guy of Lusignan. Tensions grew between Count Raymond and King Guy: the former requested help from Saladin, the Muslim ruler of Egypt, and Tiberias was defended by Saladin's forces. In early 1187, it became clear that Saladin was preparing to attack the kingdom. After a Christian army was annihilated by Saladin's forces at the battle of Cresson in May, Raymond's reputation collapsed. Arab chroniclers report that the leaders of the kingdom threatened to have him excommunicated and his marriage with Eschiva annulled. He therefore submitted to Guy. Raymond left Tiberias in May to join the king's forces at Sepphoris. He instructed Eschiva and her bailifs that, if they should find themselves unable to defend Tiberias from Saladin, they should board their boats and wait for him in the Sea of Galilee. Raymond took with him all the knights of Galilee, including Eschiva's four sons, leaving her with only the town's garrison to protect her.

The Principality of Galilee was the first target of Saladin's anticipated invasion. In the morning of 2 July, he laid siege to Tiberias. Eschiva sent a messenger on horseback to Sepphoris to inform the king, the count, and the barons that the Muslims were about to storm the town; the town indeed fell by noon, forcing Eschiva and her subjects to retreat into the citadel. The messenger arrived to Sepphoris in the evening. The men there could not agree on whether they should attack the Muslims to lift the siege. Raymond counselled against intervention, trusting in the fortification and garrison of Tiberias. He was condemned by his peers as an unchivalrous coward for risking the lives of his wife and her household. Eschiva's sons were anxious to rescue their mother. King Guy, advised by the master of the Knights Templar, Gerard of Ridefort, decided to head towards Tiberias to face the Muslims. This decision proved disastrous for them: on 4 July, the Christian army was destroyed at the battle of Hattin.

Believing that her husband and sons were killed, Eschiva started negotiating terms of surrender with Saladin. She offered to surrender the citadel of Tiberias to Saladin in return for a safe conduct to Tripoli "for herself, her children, her followers and her possessions". Lewis argues that these children could not have been her four adult sons but either daughters or undocumented younger sons by Walter. Saladin granted this, and Eschiva surrendered Tiberias on 5 July. According to Baha ad-Din ibn Shaddad, 4,000 people left Tiberias with Eschiva. As it turned out, Raymond had survived by fleeing the battlefield. One of Eschiva's sons was captured, but others fled with Raymond. The couple reunited either in Tyre or in Tripoli. Raymond died there in late summer, likely in September. By that time, the kingdom had been lost. Eschiva disappears from historical record in 1187.

== Sources ==
- Barber, Malcolm (2012). The Crusader States. Yale University Press. ISBN 978-0-300-11312-9.
- Braun, Eliot; Razi, Zvi (1992). "The Lost Crusader Castle of Tiberias". The Horns of Ḥaṭṭīn. Proceedings of the Second Conference of the Society for the Study of the Crusades and the Latin East. Yad Izhak Ben-Zvi. ISBN 978-965-217-085-9.
- Hamilton, Bernard (2000). The Leper King and His Heirs: Baldwin IV and the Crusader Kingdom of Jerusalem. Cambridge University Press. ISBN 978-0-521-64187-6.
- Lewis, Kevin James (2017). The Counts of Tripoli and Lebanon in the Twelfth Century: Sons of Saint-Gilles. Routledge. ISBN 978-1-4724-5890-2.
- Mayer, Hans Eberhard (1994). "The crusader principality of Galilee between Saint-Omer and Bures-sur-Yvette". In Gyselen, R. (ed.). Itinéraires d'Orient: Hommages à Claude Cahen. Groupe pour l'Étude de la Civilisation du Moyen-orient. pp. 157–167. ISBN 978-2-9508266-0-2.
- Pirie-Gordon, Harry (1912). "The Reigning Princes of Galilee". The English Historical Review. 27 (107). Oxford University Press: 445–461. doi:10.1093/ehr/XXVII.CVII.445. ISSN 0013-8266. JSTOR 550606.
- Reynolds, Gordon M. (2 May 2019). "Opportunism & Duty: Gendered Perceptions of Women's Involvement in Crusade Negotiation and Mediation (1147-1254)". Medieval Feminist Forum. doi:10.17077/1536-8742.2096.
- Rheinheimer, Martin (1990), Das Kreuzfahrerfürstentum Galiläa, Kieler Werkstücke, Reihe C, Beitrage zur europaischen Geschichte des fruhen und hohen Mittelalters, vol. 1, Peter Lang GmbH, ISBN 9783631427033
- Runciman, Steven (1989). A History of the Crusades, Volume II: The Kingdom of Jerusalem and the Frankish East, 1100-1187. Cambridge University Press. ISBN 0-521-06163-6.
