= Maria Komnene, Queen of Jerusalem =

Queen of Jerusalem from 1167 to 1174

Maria Komnene
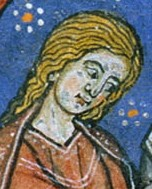
- Detail of a 13th-century French miniature

Queen consort of Jerusalem
- Tenure: 29 August 1167 – 11 July 1174
- Born: c. 1154
- Died: 1217 (aged 62–63)
- Spouses: Amalric, King of Jerusalem (m. 1167; died 1174) Balian, Lord of Ibelin (m. 1177; died 1194)
- Issue: Isabella I, Queen of Jerusalem; Helvis, Lady of Sidon; John I, Lord of Beirut; Margaret, Princess of Galilee; Philip, Regent of Cyprus
- House: Komnenos
- Father: John Doukas Komnenos

Maria Komnene (Greek: Μαρία Κομνηνή; c. 1154 – 1217), Latinized Comnena, was the queen of Jerusalem from 1167 until 1174 as the second wife of King Amalric. She occupied a central position in the Kingdom of Jerusalem for twenty years, earning a reputation for intrigue and ruthlessness.

Maria was a grandniece of Byzantine Emperor Manuel I Komnenos. Her marriage to Amalric in 1167 served to establish an alliance between the Byzantine Empire and the Kingdom of Jerusalem. When Amalric died in 1174, the crown passed to Maria's stepson, Baldwin IV, and she withdrew with her daughter, Isabella, to the city of Nablus, which she was to rule as queen dowager. Due to Baldwin's leprosy, Maria's stepdaughter, Sibylla, and daughter, Isabella, were regarded as potential successors. Maria married the lord of Ibelin, Balian, in 1177, and had four more children.

From 1180, Maria was one of the leaders of the faction opposing Sibylla and her husband Guy of Lusignan. Baldwin IV died in 1185, leaving Sibylla's son, Baldwin V, as king. When Baldwin V died the next year, Maria and her party planned to crown her daughter Isabella and son-in-law Humphrey IV of Toron, but Humphrey submitted to Sibylla and Guy, who thus solidified their hold on the kingdom. Saladin, ruler of Egypt and Syria, invaded in 1187, capturing Jerusalem and most of the kingdom. Sibylla died in 1190 while Guy was retaking Acre, and his opponents asserted that his reign had thus ended and that Isabella was the rightful heir. Maria had her daughter's marriage to Humphrey annulled so that Isabella could marry a more capable candidate, Conrad of Montferrat. Maria died in the reign of her great-granddaughter Isabella II, having outlived all her allies and adversaries.

== Background ==
Maria was the daughter of the Byzantine protosebastos John Doukas Komnenos and grandniece of Emperor Manuel I Komnenos. The Byzantine Empire was a Greek Orthodox state that claimed suzerainty over the crusader states in the Levant. Nearly all of the Christian peasants in the Kingdom of Jerusalem belonged to the Greek Orthodox Church, but the ruling class, the Franks, were Roman Catholics. The crusader states were constantly threatened by neighbouring Muslim powers.

Maria's cousin Theodora Komnene was queen of Jerusalem as the wife of King Baldwin III. Their marriage sealed Baldwin's alliance with Emperor Manuel. They had no children, however, and Baldwin was succeeded upon his death in 1163 by his brother, Amalric. The High Court of Jerusalem forced Amalric to agree to an annulment of his marriage to Agnes of Courtenay, but he successfully appealed to Pope Alexander III to have their children, Sibylla and Baldwin, declared legitimate.

== Queenship ==
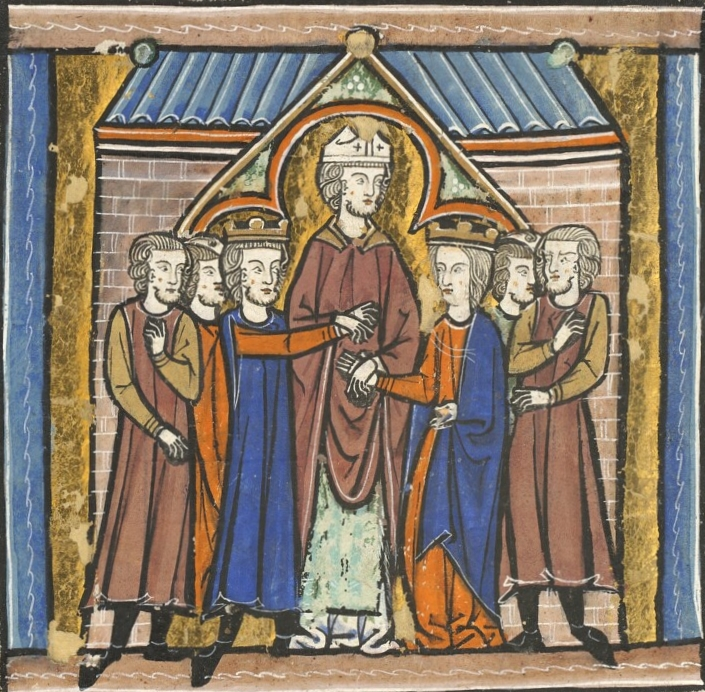
13th-century depiction of Maria marrying Amalric

Wishing to restore the alliance with the powerful Byzantine Empire, King Amalric took his vassals' advice and in 1165 sent his butler, Odo of St Amand, and the archbishop of Caesarea, Ernesius, as envoys to Emperor Manuel. Negotiations for Amalric's marriage with one of the emperor's relatives lasted two years. Maria was eventually selected and sent to the Levant.

Maria landed with Odo and Ernesius at Tyre in August 1167. Like her cousin and predecessor, Theodora, but in contrast to the Western practice, Maria was crowned before wedding. The Latin patriarch of Jerusalem, Amalric of Nesle, celebrated her marriage to the king at the Cathedral of Tyre on 29 August 1167. Both ceremonies were lavish. The historian Bernard Hamilton concludes that the new queen was neither particularly attractive, as not even her supporters flattered her, nor endowed with an impressive dowry, as her cousin Theodora had been.

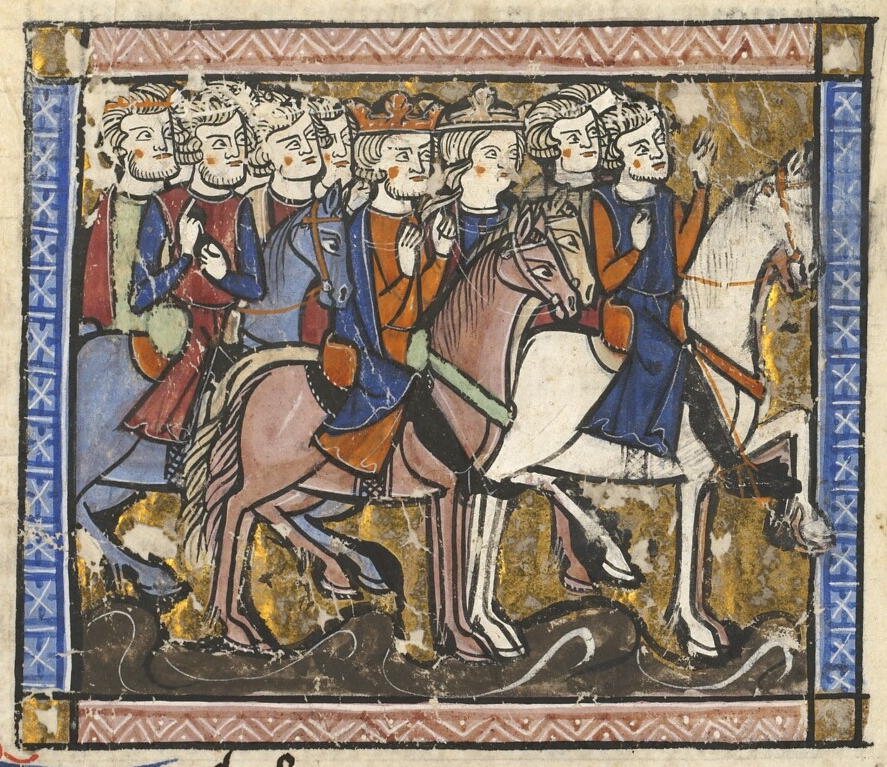
13th-century depiction of Maria and Amalric riding with entourage

Maria and her household represented Byzantine interests in the crusader states, but like Theodora in Baldwin III's reign, she had no influence on the government as queen. Amalric and Baldwin III were both keen to avoid sharing authority with their wives; Hamilton suggests that they might have been mindful of the power once wielded by their mother, Queen Melisende. Hamilton believes that Maria was also disadvantaged by having no son, while historian Deborah Gerish considers it "highly likely" that her Greek heritage and religion were also obstacles. The historian Hans E. Mayer suggests that Maria converted to Roman Catholicism after her marriage. Amalric introduced Byzantine clothing fashion into his court, which Gerish credits to his inclination towards closeness with the imperial court rather than Maria's influence.

Maria and Amalric had a daughter who died in infancy, likely born in 1171. Their only surviving child was Isabella, born in 1172. There was little affection in the relationship between the queen and her stepson, Baldwin. Maria proved markedly ambitious, and Hamilton believes that she probably resented Baldwin's precedence over her own progeny in the line of succession. The lack of a son in the royal marriage became troubling as suspicion grew that Baldwin had contracted leprosy, which was then an incurable and much stigmatised illness.

== Queen dowager ==
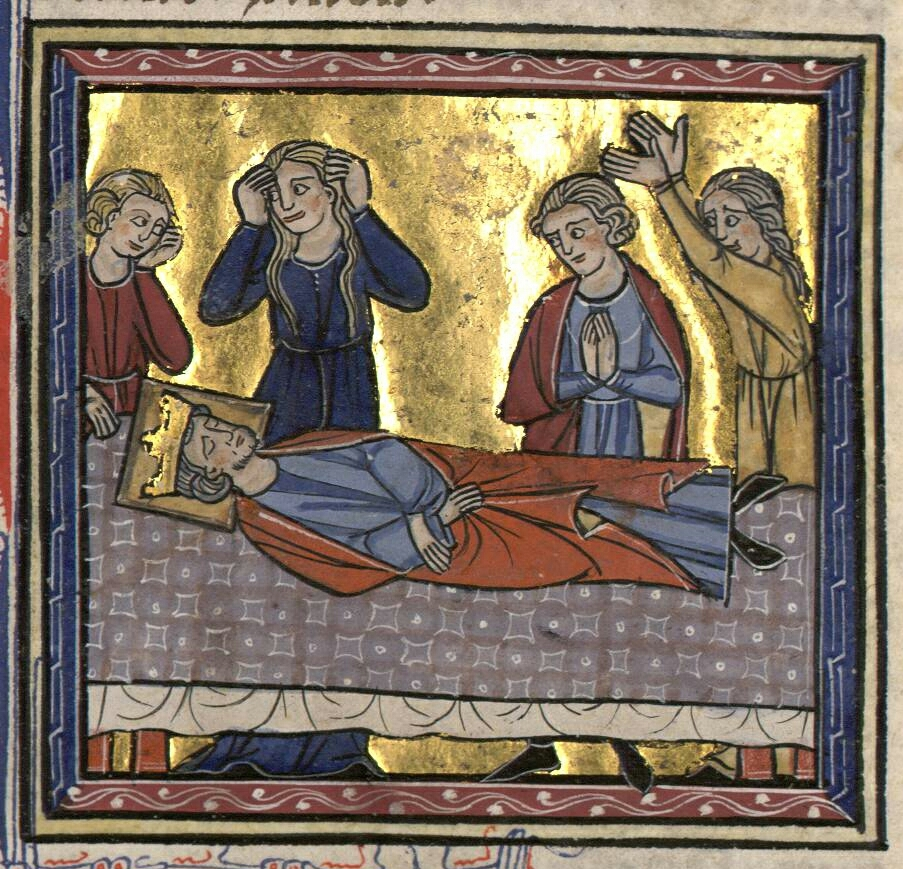
Death of King Amalric as depicted in the 13th century

=== Widowhood ===
Maria's husband, Amalric, came down with dysentery in June 1174. On his deathbed, he granted the city of Nablus, formerly held by his mother, to Maria to be held in fief as dower. He died on 11 July. Maria may have taken part in the ensuing discussion about succession to the throne. Amalric was succeeded by his only son, 13-year-old Baldwin, who had not yet been formally diagnosed with leprosy. Despite ominous symptoms, he was seen as a better candidate than his slightly older sister, Sibylla, because she was a girl and unmarried. The claim of Maria's daughter, Isabella, was unviable because she was only two years old.

Maria found herself in an unusual situation after Amalric's death: she was the queen dowager, but the new king, Baldwin IV, had a living mother, Agnes of Courtenay. Maria thus had no right to rule the kingdom as regent for the underage monarch. Having no role at court, she retired from public life and moved to Nablus with her daughter. When Count Raymond III of Tripoli assumed the regency, Agnes returned to court. Soon after his accession it became clear that Baldwin was indeed afflicted with leprosy. The diagnosis meant that he could not marry and father an heir. Amalric's daughters, Sibylla and Isabella, therefore became crucial figures, and Maria became more powerful as Isabella's mother than she had been as Amalric's wife.

=== Diplomacy ===
Baldwin reached the age of majority in 1176 and assumed personal rule. The young king started planning an invasion of Egypt, ruled by the Muslim sultan Saladin, who had become a threat to crusader states during Raymond's regency. Baldwin sought the help of Emperor Manuel, who wanted a Byzantine protectorate in the crusader states in return. Having retired from public life, Maria could not be relied upon to act as the emperor's representative in Jerusalem, and so Manuel proposed the restoration of the Greek Orthodox patriarch of Jerusalem instead. The emperor at the same time arranged for another Frankish ruler, Prince Bohemond III of Antioch, to marry the emperor's kinswoman Theodora Komnene. Hamilton believes that this Theodora was probably Maria's sister.

Count Philip I of Flanders arrived in Jerusalem in 1177. His liege, King Louis VII of France, tasked him with discussing a Franco-Byzantine alliance with Emperor Manuel on his way back to Europe. Philip was expected to assist in the Egyptian campaign, but prevaricated when he realized that he would not be granted sovereignty over conquered territory. In 1178 he visited Maria in Nablus to seek her advice about the Byzantine court. The queen dowager must have been in contact with the Byzantines in the Levant and aware of their intention to cancel the expedition due to their allies' failure to cooperate. It is likely she who explained to Philip that the High Court would pin the blame on him, thereby damaging his standing with Manuel. Philip quickly announced his readiness to assist, but the Byzantines doubted his sincerity and broke off the alliance.

=== Ibelin alliance ===
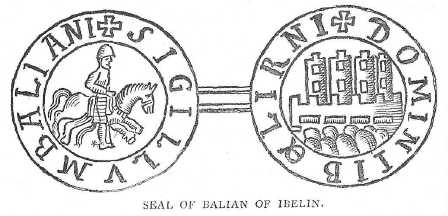
Seal of Balian of Ibelin

In late 1177, Queen Maria married Balian of Ibelin. As a female holder of a fief, Maria was required to ask the king's permission to marry. The match may have been a consolation prize to the House of Ibelin, as Balian's brother Baldwin had been denied marriage to Maria's stepdaughter, Sibylla, who was heir presumptive to the throne. Balian was to enjoy the usufruct of Nablus during Maria's lifetime, but she retained her authority. She also continued to use her royal title. The acquisition of the fief of Nablus made the Ibelin brothers the most powerful noblemen in the kingdom after Count Raymond III of Tripoli; Nablus commanded twice as many knights as Balian's lordships of Ibelin and Mirabel. Maria and Balian's union was happy and Maria played a great role in Balian's politics. They had four children: Helvis, John, Margaret, and Philip. Remarriage ended any possibility that Maria might manage the king's court; the role was assumed by Agnes, whose influence over Sibylla and Baldwin steadily increased.

In 1179, Saladin captured Maria's brother-in-law Baldwin of Ibelin. It is probably Maria who informed her granduncle Manuel about the scheme to have Baldwin marry Sibylla, prompting the emperor to pay his extortionate ransom. Sibylla was instead married to Guy of Lusignan in early 1180, leading to a rift among the nobility. Guy had the support of the king, the king's maternal family, and the lord of Oultrejordain, Raynald of Châtillon, while the opposing faction consisted of Queen Maria, the Ibelin brothers, Count Raymond III of Tripoli, and Prince Bohemond III of Antioch. In October, King Baldwin arranged the betrothal of his half-sister Isabella, Maria's daughter, to Raynald's stepson, Humphrey IV of Toron. Historian Steven Runciman believed this to have been Baldwin's attempt to reconciliate the two factions, while Hamilton argues that, on the contrary, the match served to prevent the Ibelin faction from using Isabella as a pawn in a dynastic conflict and that it was "almost certainly" the idea of the king's mother, Agnes. Isabella, then aged eight, was sent to live at Kerak Castle with Humphrey's mother, Stephanie of Milly, who prevented her from visiting Maria in Nablus.

=== Muslim threat ===
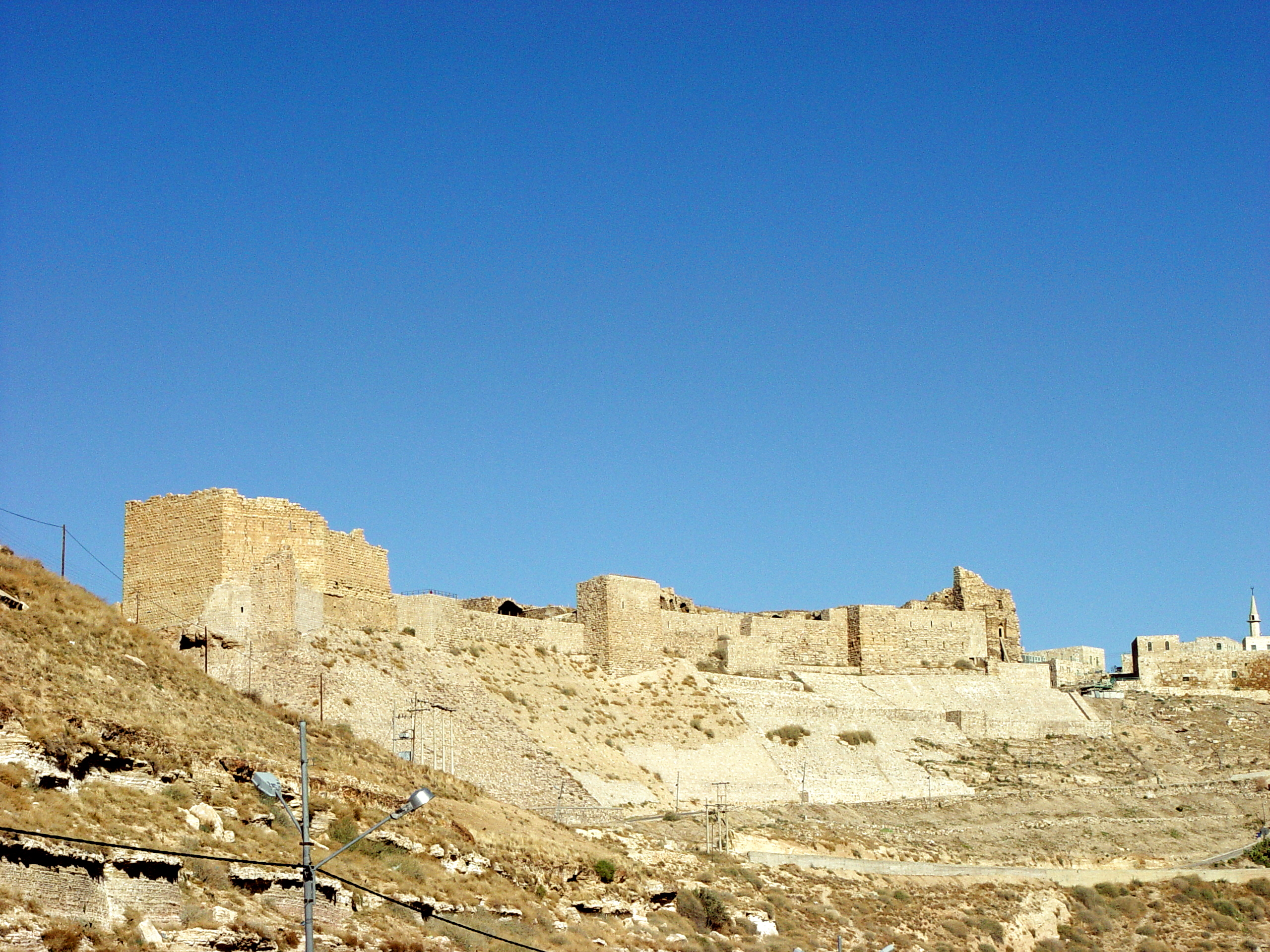
Kerak Castle

Isabella and Humphrey's wedding was held at Kerak in late 1183. Maria attended despite being a personal enemy of the groom's stepfather, Raynald. Extravagant festivities were cut short by the news of the approach of Saladin's army. The sultan had heard about the gathering and carefully planned his attack to increase the odds of obtaining valuable prisoners. It is probably from Maria, wife of his patron, that the chronicler Ernoul derives his account of the siege of Kerak. According to him, Humphrey's mother sent dishes from the wedding banquet to Saladin in return for his promise not to bombard the newlywed's lodgings. King Baldwin had meanwhile fallen out with Sibylla's husband, Guy. Upon hearing about the siege, he disinherited Guy and Sibylla and had Sibylla's son, Baldwin V, crowned as co-king. The king then led his army to the relief of Kerak.

In 1184, Saladin again besieged Kerak and once more fled before Baldwin IV's army. Knowing that all the king's troops were at Kerak, he attacked Nablus between 8 and 10 September. As Balian was at Kerak too, Hamilton concludes that it was presumably Maria who conducted the defence. The city was unwalled and she could do nothing to prevent Saladin from sacking it, but no Franks were killed because she took the entire population inside the citadel.

=== Succession dispute ===
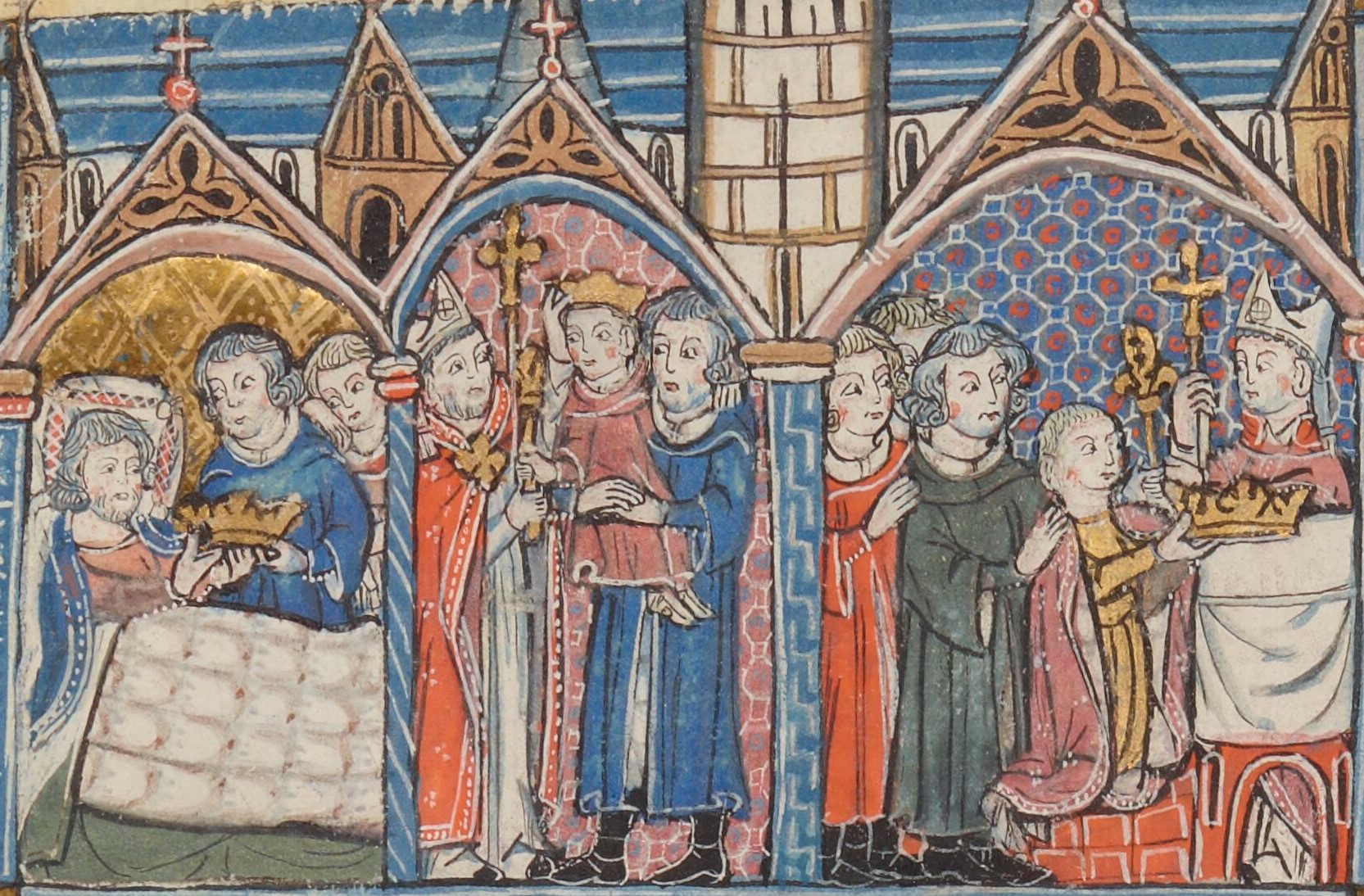
Death of Baldwin IV, Baldwin V carried by Balian, and Raymond's assumption of regency as depicted in Acre in the 13th century

Having become completely disabled as leprosy progressed, Baldwin IV lay on his deathbed in early 1185. He arranged for Sibylla's son, Baldwin V, to undergo a crown-wearing ceremony after which Maria's husband, Balian, expressed their family's support for the boy by carrying him to banquet on his shoulders. The High Court awarded regency to Raymond of Tripoli. Raymond demanded that, in the case of Baldwin V's death, the decision of whether the crown should pass to Sibylla ("the daughter of Countess Agnes") or Isabella ("the daughter of Queen Maria") would be made by the pope, the Holy Roman emperor, and the kings of England and France. Baldwin IV died after the barons promised to uphold this condition.

The boy king Baldwin V died of unknown causes in mid-1186. Sibylla hurried to Jerusalem to claim the throne. She and her supporters secured most of the royal domain while Raymond summoned the High Court to Maria's city of Nablus. The meeting was attended by Maria, Isabella, Humphrey, the Ibelins, and likely Raymond's stepsons, Hugh, William, and Ralph. When news of Sibylla and Guy's coronation in Jerusalem reached them, Raymond suggested crowning Isabella and Humphrey as rival monarchs. The argument that Isabella had a better claim than Sibylla because she was born in their father's reign while Sibylla had been born earlier probably came from Maria and the Byzantine tradition of porphyrogeniture, posits historian Jonathan Riley-Smith. Humphrey was unwilling to cause a civil war, however, and foiled the plan by sneaking out of Nablus and submitting to Sibylla. After that the rest of the nobility convened in Nablus, except Baldwin of Ibelin and Raymond, arrived to submit as well.

=== Third Crusade ===
Saladin took advantage of the discord between the nobles. He invaded the kingdom in April 1187 and won the Battle of Hattin on 4 July, which proved to be decisive. He captured King Guy and executed Lord Raynald, and Count Raymond died of an illness soon afterwards. Queen Maria and her children left Nablus and joined her stepdaughter, Queen Sibylla, in Jerusalem. After besieging the capital, Saladin arranged for Maria, her children, household, and possessions to be escorted to Tyre. Jerusalem fell on 2 October. Maria reunited with Sibylla in Tripoli. Guy, who was released in 1188, decided to besiege Acre. The queens, Balian, Isabella, and Humphrey accompanied him, and the Third Crusade ensued.

The Kingdom of Jerusalem without Jerusalem, as reconstituted in 1192

Unity appeared to have been restored during the crusade until Sibylla and her daughters by Guy died of an epidemic in mid-1190. Isabella was Sibylla's heir, but Guy attempted to retain the throne. The unpopularity of her husband, Humphrey, weakened Isabella's chances of supplanting Guy. Humphrey had alienated Guy's opponents by refusing to oppose him in 1186, while Maria had not forgiven him for his role in separating her from Isabella. Maria immediately allied with Conrad of Montferrat, the leader of the defence of Tyre who desired the kingship. With her party, which included Balian, Reynald of Sidon, and Pagan II of Haifa, she abducted her daughter from her tent next to Humphrey's. Isabella had been happy with Humphrey, and Maria had to browbeat her into agreeing to have their marriage annulled, arguing that her succession rights could not otherwise be enforced. Maria then stated before the papal legate, Archbishop Ubaldo Lanfranchi of Pisa, and the bishop of Beauvais, Philip of Dreux, that Isabella had been forced by Baldwin IV to marry Humphrey and that she was underage at the time. Isabella was subsequently crowned and married to Conrad.

== Last years ==
The Third Crusade brought the reconquest of a strip of coast from Jaffa to Tyre in 1192, but the kingdom remained without Jerusalem itself. Balian died in 1194 and Maria did not remarry again. She retained an active role in family affairs. Maria's native Byzantine state, which had ceased to be a great power in the 1180s, was all but destroyed in the Fourth Crusade, while the Kingdom of Jerusalem was reduced to a rump state centred in Acre; yet, Maria's influence only increased.

Maria's son-in-law, Conrad of Montferrat, died shortly after his marriage to Isabella. Isabella then married Count Henry II of Champagne and finally King Aimery of Cyprus. When she died in 1205, the crown of Jerusalem passed to her eldest daughter, Maria of Montferrat, aged about 14. The following year, the dowager queen and her son John decided that the young heiress should marry King Peter II of Aragon, but Peter was unable to obtain an annulment of his existing marriage. The next in line to the throne was Maria of Montferrat's half-sister Alice of Champagne, who presumably came under the guardianship of their grandmother, Maria Komnene. According to a 1197 agreement between Henry of Champagne and Aimery of Cyprus, Alice was to marry King Hugh I of Cyprus, Aimery's son and successor. Maria Komnene supervised her granddaughter's marriage contract. The wedding was celebrated in 1210. The same year, Maria of Montferrat married John of Brienne and was crowned queen, but died in childbirth in 1212.

Having outlived all the principal figures of Christian-ruled Jerusalem, Maria may have provided valuable recollections of the kingdom's laws and customs to her son John, who became a noted jurist. The other son, Philip, served as bailli (regent) of Cyprus. Her daughter Margaret married successively Hugh of Tiberias and Walter III of Caesarea. Another daughter, Helvis, married Reynald of Sidon, the widower of her mother's rival Agnes. Maria died in mid-1217, in the reign of her great-granddaughter Isabella II. All the kings of Jerusalem and Cyprus and much of the 13th-century nobility of both kingdoms descended from her.

== Character ==
A very hostile source, the Itinerarium Regis Ricardi, describes Maria as being "steeped in Greek filth from the cradle", and says that the character of her husband Balian "matched her own":

Where he was savage, she was godless; where he was shallow-minded, she was fickle; where he was treacherous, she was scheming.

Maria was resilient and adaptable, which, says Hamilton, enabled her to thrive politically in spite of unfavourable circumstances. Like her mother-in-law Melisende and rival Agnes, Maria desired power, but Hamilton notes that she differed from them in being interested more in practical matters than in appearances and thus worked to acquire power in "more devious" ways. Her opponents described her as ruthless and scheming, and Hamilton concludes that "there was some truth" in their view.

Royal titles
Vacant Title last held by Theodora Komnene	Queen consort of Jerusalem; 1167–1174	Vacant Title next held by Elisabeth of Bavaria
