= Hugh of Saint Omer =

Hugh of Saint Omer may refer to:

- Hugh of Fauquembergues, also Hugh I of Saint Omer (d. 1105/6), crusader
- Hugh II of Saint Omer (d. 1204), crusader
