= Assise sur la ligece =

Legislation passed in the first Kingdom of Jerusalem

Coat of arms of the kingdom of Jerusalem.

The Assise sur la ligece (roughly, "Assize on liege-homage") was an important piece of legislation passed by the High Court of Jerusalem, the feudal court of the crusader Kingdom of Jerusalem, in an unknown year but probably in the 1170s under King Amalric.

The Assise formally prohibited the illegal confiscation of fiefs and required all the king's vassals to ally against any lord who did so. Such a lord would not be tried, but would be stripped of his land or exiled instead. The king could now legally confiscate a fief if a vassal refused to pay homage to him; this had been done in the past but was technically illegal before this Assise. Apparently the Assise was created after a dispute between Gerard, lord of Sidon, and King Amalric; Gerard had dispossessed one of his rear-vassals and refused to return the land even when Amalric stepped in. Open warfare was just barely avoided.

The Assise also made all nobles direct vassals of the king, eliminating the previous distinction between higher and lesser nobles. This distinction still existed in reality, and although they theoretically had an equal voice in the Haute Cour, lesser nobles could only appeal to the high court when their own baronial courts refused to hear their complaints. In any case, the more powerful barons refused to be tried by lesser lords who were not their peers, and the higher nobles could still judge the less powerful lords themselves. There were about 600 men eligible to vote in the Court according to the Assise.

== Usage ==
During the period of near constant warfare in the early decades of the 12th century, the king of Jerusalem's foremost role was as leader of the feudal host. They rarely awarded land or lordships, and those they did that became vacant—a frequent event because of the high mortality rate in the conflict—reverted to the crown. Instead, their followers' loyalty was rewarded with city incomes. As a result, the royal domain of the first five rulers—including much of Judea, Samaria, the coast from Jaffa to Ascalon, the ports of Acre and Tyre, and other scattered castles and territories—was larger than the combined holdings of the nobility. This meant the rulers of Jerusalem had greater internal power than comparative western monarchs, although they did not have the administrative systems and personnel to govern such a large realm.

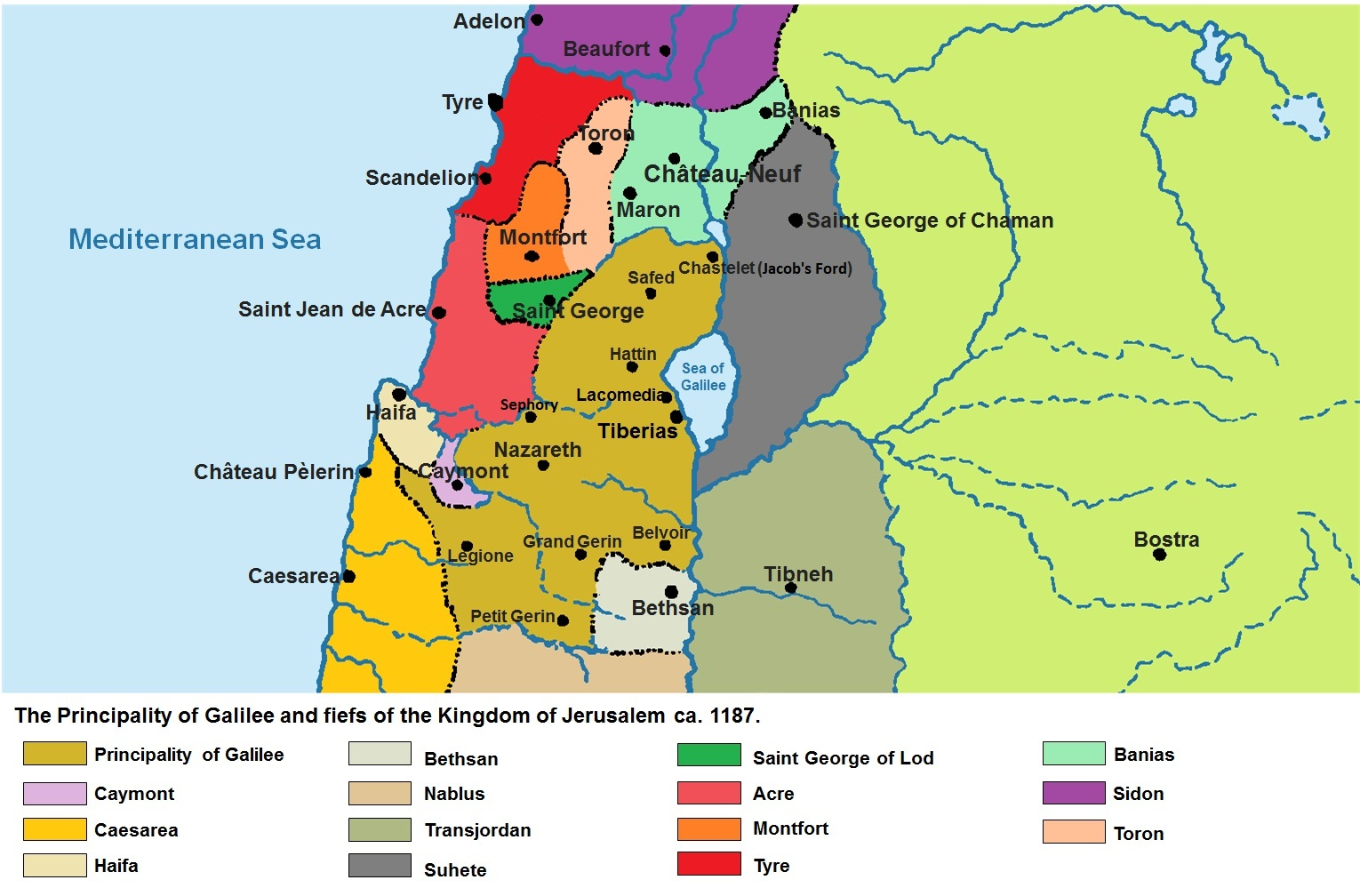
Map of the feudatories of the Kingdom of Jerusalem in 1187

The situation evolved in the second quarter of the century with the establishment of baronial dynasties. Magnates—such as Raynald of Châtillon, Lord of Transjordan, and Count Raymond III of Tripoli, prince of Galilee—often acted as autonomous rulers. Royal powers were abrogated, and governance was undertaken effectively within the feudatories. What central control remained was exercised at the High Court. Only the 13th-century jurists of Jerusalem used this term; curia regis was more common in Europe. These were meetings between the king and his tenants in chief. Over time, the duty of the vassal to give counsel developed into a privilege and ultimately the legitimacy of the monarch depended on the agreement of the court. In practice, the High Court comprised the great barons and the king's direct vassals. In law, a quorum was the king and three tenants-in-chief. In 1162, assise sur la ligece theoretically expanded the court's membership to all 600 or more fief-holders, making them all peers. All those who paid homage directly to the king were now members of the Haute Cour of Jerusalem. The heads of the military orders joined them by the end of the 12th century, and the Italian communes in the 13th century. The leaders of the Third Crusade ignored the monarchy of Jerusalem; the kings of England and France agreed on the division of future conquests as if there was no need to take into account the nobility of the crusader states. Joshua Prawer considered the rapid offering of the throne to Conrad of Montferrat in 1190 and then Henry II of Champagne in 1192, demonstrated the weakness of the crown of Jerusalem. This was given legal effect by Baldwin IV's will stipulate if Baldwin V died a minor, the pope, the kings of England and France, and the Holy Roman emperor should select the successor.

Before the defeat at Hattin in 1187, the laws developed by the court were documented as assises in Letters of the Holy Sepulchre. After Hattin, the Franks lost their cities, lands and churches. Many barons fled to Cyprus and intermarried with leading new emigres from the Lusignan, Montbéliard, Brienne and Montfort families. This created a class apart from the remnants of the old nobility with limited understanding of the Latin East including the king-consorts Guy, Conrad, Henry, Aimery, John and the absent Hohenstaufen that followed. The entire body of written law was lost in the subsequent fall of Jerusalem. From this point, the legal system was based largely on custom and the memory of the lost legislation. The renowned jurist Philip of Novara lamented:

We know [the laws] rather poorly, for they are known by hearsay and usage...and we think an assize is something we have seen as an assize...in the kingdom of Jerusalem [the barons] made much better use of the laws and acted on them more surely before the land was lost.

Thus, a myth was created of an idyllic early 12th-century legal system. The barons used this to reinterpret the assise sur la ligece, which Almalric I intended to strengthen the crown, to constrain the monarch instead, particularly regarding their right to remove feudal fiefs without trial. The concomitant loss of the vast majority of rural fiefs led to the barons becoming an urban mercantile class where knowledge of the law was a valuable, well-regarded skill and a career path to higher status. The barons of Jerusalem in the 13th century have been poorly regarded by both contemporary and modern commentators: their superficial rhetoric disgusted James of Vitry; Riley-Smith writes of their pedantry and the use of spurious legal justification for political action. For the barons themselves, it was this ability to articulate the law that was so prized. The sources of this are the elaborate and impressive treatises by the great baronial jurists from the second half of the 13th century.

The Barons invoked the assise sur la ligece three times in justification of open opposition to arbitrary acts by the king: in 1198, 1229 and 1232. Ralph of Tiberias set the precedent when he was accused of attempted regicide. King Aimery had narrowly survived an attempted murder by four armed members of the German Crusade in Tyre. While recovering, he became convinced that Ralph was responsible. At a meeting of the High Court, Aimery exiled him, ordering his departure from the kingdom within eight days. In response, Ralph devised a defence based on an interpretation of the assise sur la ligece. The defence was it was an absolute necessity that a case concerning the relationship between a lord and his vassal was judged in court, that vassals were peers bound to give mutual assistance and that vassals should withdraw service from a lord who refused to submit to the court's decision. Ralph's innovation was applying the assise to the king himself. Aimery refused. His vassals withdrew service from him until 1200 following great words, but Ralph still went into banishment. He only returned in 1207 after the king's death. In the later accounts of the jurists, Ralph was credited with a great achievement. He set a precedent in applying the assise to the actions of the crown. This provided him and his peers with justification, a method of resistance and sanctions that could be legally applied. At the same time, it is clear that the use of the assise sur la ligece was ineffective. Aimery's refusal meant Ralph had still found it necessary to leave the country.

The second time the precedent was followed consciously happened in 1228 after the arrival in the kingdom of Emperor Frederick II. Three years earlier, he had become king-consort when he married Isabella II and immediately claimed the throne of Jerusalem from her father, the king-regent, John of Brienne. Isabella died in the summer of that year, after giving birth to a son. The son, Conrad, was through his mother, the king of Jerusalem. As a result, on his arrival, Frederick was received as regent. In 1229, Frederick successfully negotiated the return of Jerusalem, lost in 1187 from Egypt, and went under the imperial crown in the Holy Sepulchre. Perhaps in a fit of hubris following the acquisition of the city, according to the later baronial jurists, he instructed his bailli Balian Grenier to take control of the Acre possessions of John of Beirut, Walter I Grenier, Walter III of Caesarea, John of Jaffa, Robert of Haifa, Phillip l'asne and John Moriau. These barons invoked the assise sur la ligece and their combined force restored their possessions. According to a surviving charter, Alice of Armenia took the same approach to claim the lordship of Toron. Frederick had awarded this to the Order of Brothers of the German House of Saint Mary in Jerusalem on its recovery. After this was decided in Alice's favour, a clear baronial victory, the Barons re-entered the Emperor's service. This was the high point of the vassals' ability to use the law to resist a monarch infringing what they believed to be their rights. From May 1229, when Frederick II left the Holy Land to defend his Italian and German lands, monarchs were absent—Conrad from 1225 until 1254 and his son Conradin until his execution by Charles of Anjou in 1268. Government in Jerusalem had developed in the opposite direction to monarchies in the west. European monarchs such as St Louis, Emperor Frederick and King Edward I—contemporary rulers of France, Germany and England respectively—were powerful with bureaucratic machinery for administration, jurisdiction and legislation. Jerusalem had a royalty without power.

The third invocation of the assise sur la ligece followed the Ibelin's fight for control with an Italian army led by Frederick's viceroy Richard Filangieri in the War of the Lombards. Filangieri besieged John of Beirut's city and convened the High Court to confirm his appointment as regent. When the court demanded he lift the siege, Filangieri implied John had committed treason, and if the court disagreed they should write to the Emperor for final judgement. Tyre, the Hospitallers, the Teutonic Knights and the Pisans supported Filangieri. In opposition were the Ibelins, Acre, the Templars and Genoa. The rebels established a surrogate commune, or parliament in Acre. The commune was developed from the confraternity of St Andrew. It had its own bell and officers. The most important was the major, a position for which John of Beirut was chosen. There was also a deputy major, consuls and captains. Membership was open to all free men. While the commune presented itself as representing the whole country, it did not even represent all of Acre, and large numbers still supported the Emperor. After 1236, there is little written evidence of the commune's activities and it is clear that it never adopted governmental functions. The main objective seems to have been an attempt to match Filangieri's mandate and resist Frederick II. Ultimately, the barons' motivation resulted from Filangieri rejecting the invocation of the Assise. The Barons withdrew their service and attempted to use force, but this was ineffective. Filangieri's Italian army was more than capable of resisting. This demonstrated the weakness in the Baron's case. The Assise relied on the king being weak. With a strong force of what John called foreign people or mercenaries supporting the monarchy, the Assise could not be enforced. The baronial jurists such as Philip of Novara and John of Jaffa do not mention this failure, the events of 1232 or even the bailliage of Filangieri. Instead, their impressive treatments articulated their political and constitutional ideas rather than the political reality.

== See also ==
- Assizes of Jerusalem

== Bibliography ==
- Asbridge, Thomas (2012). The Crusades: The War for the Holy Land. Simon & Schuster. ISBN 978-1-84983-688-3.
- Bassett, Hayley. (2018). "Regnant Queenship and Royal Marriage between the Latin Kingdom of Jerusalem and the Nobility of Western Europe". In Woodacre, Elena (ed.). A Companion to Global Queenship. Arc Humanities Press. pp. 39–52. ISBN 9781942401469. JSTOR j.ctvmd8390.9.
- Jotischky, Andrew (2004). Crusading and the Crusader States. Taylor & Francis. ISBN 978-0-582-41851-6.
- MacEvitt, Christopher (2008). The Crusades and the Christian World of the East:rough tolerance. University of Pennsylvania Press. ISBN 978-0-8122-2083-4.
- Prawer, Joshua (1972). The Crusaders' Kingdom. Phoenix Press. ISBN 978-1-84212-224-2.
- Riley-Smith, Jonathan (1971). "The Assise sur la Ligece and the Commune of Acre". Traditio. 27: 179–204. doi:10.1017/S0362152900005316. JSTOR 27830920.
