= Hugh of Tiberias =

Hugh of Tiberias may refer to:

- Hugh of Fauquembergues, prince of Galilee and Tiberias (1101–1105/06)
- Hugh II of Saint-Omer, titular prince of Galilee and Tiberias (1187–1204)
