= Elinand of Tiberias =

Elinand

prince of Galilee
- Reign: 1143/44–1148/49
- Predecessor: William I of Bures
- Successor: William II of Bures or Simon of Bures
- Died: 1148/49
- Spouse: Ermengarde of Ibelin (?)
- Issue: William II of Bures (?); Eschiva of Bures (?)
- Father: Godfrey of Bures or Hosto of Fauquembergues (both uncertain)
- Religion: Roman Catholicism

Elinand, also known as Elinard, was prince of Galilee from 1143 or 1144 to around 1149. His parentage is unknown. He succeeded William I of Bures who either had died, or been forced into exile. Elinand was one of the main supporters of Queen Melisende of Jerusalem. Mu'in ad-Din Unur, the ruler of Damascus, bribed him during the siege of Damascus in 1148, according to gossips spreading in the crusaders' camp.

== Origins ==
According to a widespread scholarly theory, Elinand was related to William I of Bures, who received the Principality of Galilee from Baldwin II of Jerusalem in 1119 or 1120. Historian Martin Rheinheimer associates Elinand with Elias, who was William I's nephew. William I referred to Elias and his brother, William, as his heirs in 1126. Rheinheimer also says, the brothers were the sons of William I's brother, Godfrey. Godfrey was killed during a plundering raid in the spring of 1119. Hans Eberhard Mayer refutes the association of Elinand with William I's nephew, emphasizing that the Biblical name, Elias, cannot be identical with the Germanic Elinand. Historian Malcolm Barber identifies Elinand as William I's second son.

Mayer underlines that nothing proves that Elinand was William I's kinsman. Mayer also notes, Elinand's otherwise rare name is well-documented in the region of Saint-Omer and Fauquembergues in the 12th century. He concludes that Elinand was most probably a member of the Saint-Omer family, and thus he was related to the second prince of Galilee, Hugh of Fauquembergues. He tentatively identifies Elinand's father with Hosto of Fauquembergues, who was castellan of Saint-Omer in the late 1120s, although no document evidences that Hosto fathered children.

== Prince of Galilee ==
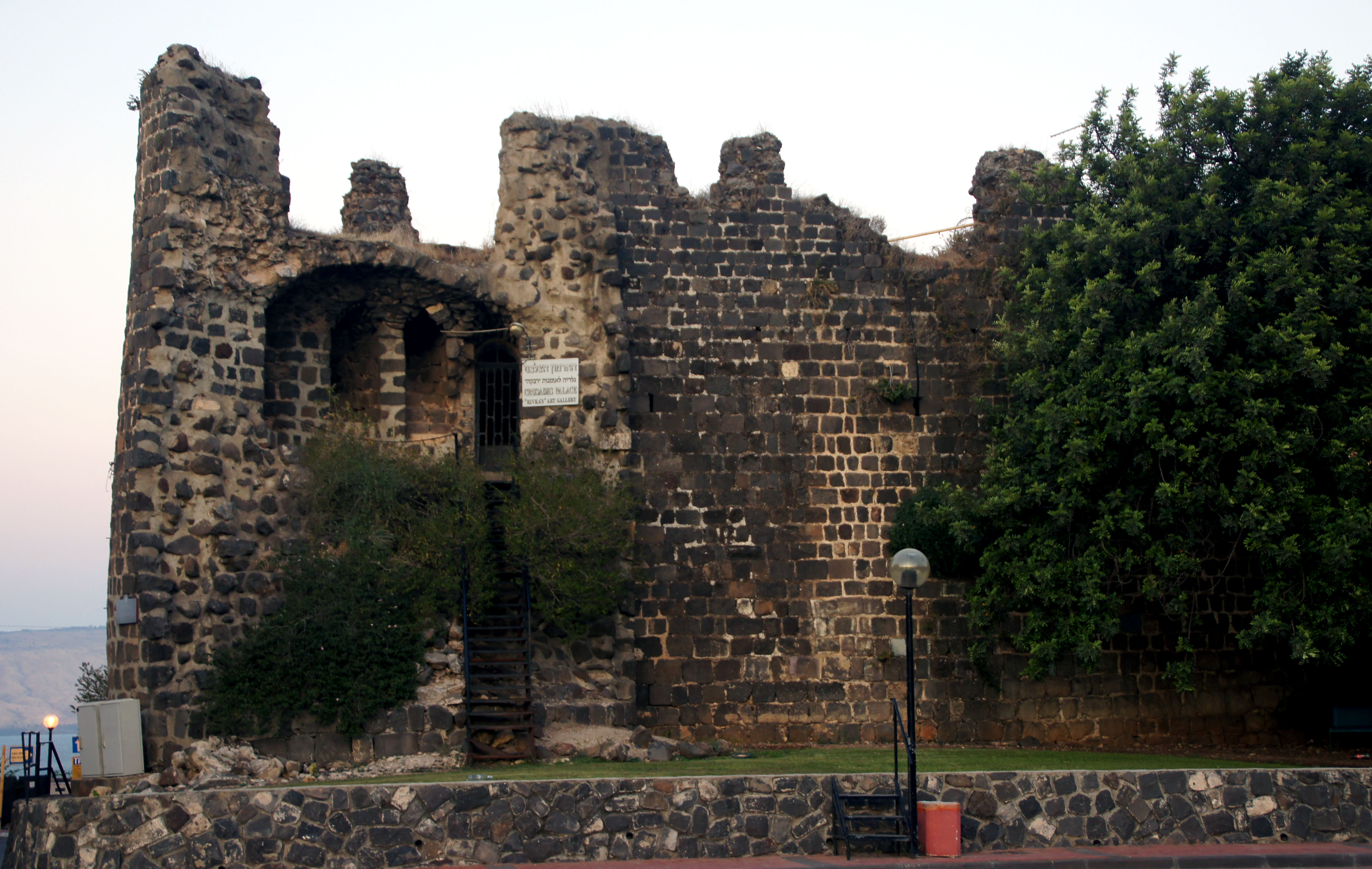
Ruins of the crusaders' castle at Tiberias, the seat of the Principality of Galilee

The circumstances of Elinand's emergence to power are unknown. Rheinheimer says that Elinand inherited the principality of Galilee (also known as the lordship of Tiberias) from William I in 1144. Mayer argues that Elinand seized Galilee with the support of Queen Melisende of Jerusalem, who had forced William I into exile after the death of her husband, King Fulk. Elinand became one of Melisende's main supporters.

Imad ad-Din Zengi laid siege to Edessa in late November 1144. Along with Manasses of Hierges and Philip of Milly, Eliland was appointed by Melisende to lead a relieve army to the town. They did not reach Edessa, because its defenders surrendered before the end of the year. Barber proposes that they most probably went to Antioch and participated in Raymond of Antioch's unsuccessful counter-offensive in early 1145.

Eliland attended the assembly of the commanders of the Second Crusade at Acre on 24 June 1148. The commanders decided to attack Damascus. The siege of Damascus began on 23 July, but four days later the crusaders abandoned the siege and returned to the kingdom. According to gossips which had started to spread among the crusaders during the siege, Mu'in ad-Din Unur, the ruler of Damascus, bribed Elinand. Shortly thereafter, Elinand either died, or forfeited Galilee.

== Family ==
A royal charter referred to Ermengarde, a sister of Hugh of Ibelin, as the lady of Tiberias in 1155. Rheinheimer, Sylvia Schein and other historians write that Ermengarde was Elinand's wife. They also say that Elinand's successor, William II, and William's heir, Eschiva, were their children. On the other hand, Mayer and Peter W. Edbury propose that Ermengarde of Ibelin was the wife of William I of Bures. Mayer also says that Elinand was succeeded by William I's nephew, Simon of Bures.

== Sources ==
- Barber, Malcolm (2012). The Crusader States. Yale University Press. ISBN 978-0-300-11312-9.
- Edbury, Peter W. (1997). John of Ibelin and the Kingdom of Jerusalem. The Boydell Press. ISBN 978-0-85115-703-0.
- Lock, Peter (2006). The Routledge Companion to the Crusades. Routledge. ISBN 9-78-0-415-39312-6.
- Mayer, Hans Eberhard (1994). "The crusader principality of Galilee between Saint-Omer and Bures-sur-Yvette" (PDF). In Gyselen, R. (ed.). Itinéraires d'Orient: Hommages à Claude Cahen. Groupe pour l'Étude de la Civilisation du Moyen-orient. pp. 157–167. ISBN 978-2-9508266-0-2.
- Schein, Sylvia (1994). "Women in Medieval Colonial Society: The Latin Kingdom of Jerusalem in the Twelfth Century". In Edgington, Susan B.; Lambert, Sarah (eds.). Gendering the Crusades. Columbia University Press. pp. 140–152. ISBN 0-231-12598-4.
- Runciman, Steven (1989). A History of the Crusades, Volume II: The Kingdom of Jerusalem and the Frankish East, 1100-1187. Cambridge University Press. ISBN 0-521-06163-6.

Elinand of Tiberias Died: 1148/1149
Preceded by William I of Bures	Prince of Galilee; 1143/1144–1148/1149	Succeeded by William II of Bures or Simon of Bures
