= Odo of Montbéliard =

13th-century baron in the Kingdom of Jerusalem

Coat of arms of Odo of Montbéliard.

Odo of Montbéliard or Eudes de Montbéliard (died 1247) was a leading baron of the crusader Kingdom of Jerusalem in the early 13th century. He often held the highest offices in the kingdom including bailli (viceroy) and constable (commander of the army).

Odo was the nephew of Walter of Montbéliard, a regent of the Kingdom of Cyprus. Odo's wife Eschiva of Saint Omer, daughter of Ralph of Saint Omer, was the heir of the Principality of Galilee.

In 1220 Odo was appointed constable of the Kingdom of Jerusalem by the king, John of Brienne. In 1223 Odo was appointed as bailli of the kingdom. However, in 1227 the Holy Roman emperor and king of Jerusalem, Frederick II, sent out Thomas of Aquino to replace Odo. The following year Odo was appointed as one of the three commanders of Frederick's Crusade along with Richard Filangieri and Hermann von Salza.

At the end of the Sixth Crusade, just before Frederick left Acre (1229) to return to Europe, he appointed Odo as constable. Then while Frederick was on his way to the harbour he was pelted with dung and entrails by the unappreciative people of Acre. Odo and John of Ibelin quelled the unrest.

In 1233 Odo was caught up in the disaffection at Frederick's decision to appoint Philip of Maugastel as bailli; an appointment which Odo was prepared to support. A furious mob attacked supporters of Philip and it was only the intervention of John of Caesarea that saved Odo from being killed. Odo and Balian of Sidon shared the role of bailli in 1236 against the wishes of Pope Gregory IX whose choice of Richard Filangieri was unacceptable to the barons.

Odo took part in Theobald I of Navarre's Crusade of 1239-1240 but there were tensions between Theobald and local barons including Odo. However, the treaty between Theobald and as-Salih Ismail, the emir of Damascus, in 1240 gave Galilee back to the Kingdom of Jerusalem, and as Odo of Montbéliard was titular Prince of Galilee (by right of his marriage to Eschiva of Saint-Omer), he now took up the rule of Galilee.

Tiberias, the capital of Galilee, was sacked by the Khwarezmian army in 1244, after which Odo began rebuilding the citadel. But in 1247 the city of Tiberias and Odo's Principality of Galilee were lost to the armies of the Ayyubid sultan as-Salih Ayyub. Odo died later that year.

== Sources ==
- Edbury, Peter W. (1994). The Kingdom of Cyprus and the Crusades, 1191-1374. Cambridge University Press.
- Peters, Edward, ed. (1971). Christian Society and the Crusades, 1198-1229 (2nd ed.). University of Pennsylvania Press.
- Pirie-Gordon, H. (1912). "The Reigning Princes of Galilee". The English Historical Review. XXVII (CVII): 445–461. doi:10.1093/ehr/XXVII.CVII.445. ISSN 0013-8266.
- Riley-Smith, Jonathan (1974). Feudal Nobility and the Kingdom of Jerusalem, 1174-1277. Palgrave Macmillan.
- Runciman, Steven (1999). A History of the Crusades. Vol. II: The Kingdom of Jerusalem and the Frankish East, 1100–1187. Cambridge University Press.
- Van Cleve, Thomas C. (1969). "The Crusade of Frederick II". In Wolff, R. L.; Hazard, H. W. (eds.). A History of the Crusades. Vol. II. University of Wisconsin Press.
