= Eschiva of Saint-Omer =

Princess of Galilee, ruled 1240–1247

Eschiva of Saint-Omer (died 1265), was a princess suo jure of the Principality of Galilee from 1240 to 1247. She was the daughter of Ralph of Saint-Omer.

== Early life ==
Eschiva was the daughter of Ralph of Saint-Omer and Agnes Grenier, the daughter of Reginald of Sidon. In 1198, Ralph was exiled from the Kingdom of Jerusalem after attempting to assassinate King Aimery. During his trial, Ralph formed a defence based around his interpretation of the assise sur la ligece, basing it on the need of a judgment in court for cases regarding lords and their vassals. The innovation was applying the Assise to the king himself, but Aimery refused, and his vassals withdrew service from him with Ralph going into banishment. Ralph would eventually go to Constantinople in 1204, and while it is extremely likely that Eschiva went with him, we cannot confirm this for certain.

== Marriage ==
At an unspecified time, Eschiva would marry Odo of Montbéliard, one of the most powerful noblemen in the kingdom, who would become the Prince of Galilee by right of his wife. While not much is known for certain about Eschiva, some of her life can be assumed based on her husband's activity. King John of Brienne would make Odo a highly important noble in his court, appointing him as constable in 1220 and bailli in 1223, but King Frederick sought to replace him with Thomas of Aquino. The following year, however, Odo was appointed as one of three commanders on Frederick's crusade.

In 1233, Odo was deeply upset by King Frederick's decision to appoint Maugastel as bailli, a role he was prepared to support. An enraged mob violently attacked Philip's supporters, and the intervention of John of Caesarea narrowly saved Odo from being killed. It is not known where Eschiva was at this time, but the death of her husband would have undoubtedly had serious implications for her. Odo and Balian of Sidon would go on to share the role of bailli against the wishes of the pope.

== Rule in Galilee ==
While Eschiva had always been the titular Princess of Galilee, a treaty signed between Theobald I of Navarre and Al-Salih Ismail, the Emir of Damascus on the crusade of 1239-1240 gave Galilee back to the Kingdom of Jerusalem. She would become the official princess regnant of Galilee alongside her husband Odo, but their rule was short-lived. In 1244, Tiberias, the capital of Galilee, was sacked by a Khwarazmian army, and the principality was later lost in 1247.

Eschiva's life after this point is near entirely unknown, but she died in 1265.

== Sources ==
- Mayer, Hans Eberhard (1994). "The crusader principality of Galilee between Saint-Omer and Bures-sur-Yvette". In Gyselen, R. (ed.). Itinéraires d'Orient: Hommages à Claude Cahen. Groupe pour l'Étude de la Civilisation du Moyen-orient. pp. 157–167. ISBN 978-2-9508266-0-2.
- Runciman, Steven (1989). A History of the Crusades, Volume II: The Kingdom of Jerusalem and the Frankish East, 1100-1187. Cambridge University Press. ISBN 0-521-06163-6.
- Riley-Smith, Jonathan (1973). The feudal nobility and the kingdom of Jerusalem, 1174-1277. Macmillan. ISBN 9780208013484.
- Riley-Smith, Jonathan (1971). "The Assise sur la Ligece and the Commune of Acre". Traditio. 27: 179–204. doi:10.1017/S0362152900005316. JSTOR 27830920.
- Nader, Marwan (2006). Burgesses and Burgess Law in the Latin Kingdoms of Jerusalem and Cyprus, (1099-1325). Ashgate Publishing Limited.
- Van Cleve, Thomas C. (1969). "The Crusade of Frederick II". In Wolff, R. L.; Hazard, H. W. (eds.). A History of the Crusades. Vol. II. University of Wisconsin Press.
