= William of Saint-Omer (son of Walter of Tiberias) =

Crusader noble of the Kingdom of Jerusalem

William of Saint Omer (died before 1204) was a Crusader noble of the Kingdom of Jerusalem and a son of Walter of Saint Omer, Prince of Galilee, and Eschiva of Bures.

== Family and inheritance ==
William was the second son of Walter of Saint Omer and Eschiva of Bures, after his elder brother Hugh II of Saint Omer. His younger brothers were Raoul of Saint Omer and Odo of Saint Omer. Walter died in 1174, after which Eschiva married Raymond III of Tripoli, who thereby became Prince of Galilee through his marriage to its heiress. Raymond had no children with Eschiva and acted as stepfather to her sons.

Following the Battle of Hattin in 1187 and Saladin's subsequent conquest of much of the Kingdom of Jerusalem, the Saint-Omer family's territorial possession of Galilee was lost. Raymond III died later that year. William's elder brother Hugh succeeded to the title of Prince of Galilee, although only as a titular prince because the territory itself had been lost.

In 1186, during the succession crisis following the death of Baldwin V, Raymond III summoned the High Court of Jerusalem to Nablus. William and his brothers were probably among those present as Raymond's stepsons, although the evidence for their individual attendance is not certain.

== Third Crusade ==
William supported Guy of Lusignan in his dispute with Conrad of Montferrat over the Kingdom of Jerusalem. After Guy began the siege of Acre in 1189, William joined the forces besieging the city.

The siege began in August 1189 and became the principal military operation of the early Third Crusade. William's participation placed him among the barons who continued to support Guy's claim during the prolonged struggle between Guy's faction and the supporters of Conrad.

== Marriage and descendants ==
William married Marie, a daughter of Renier, constable of Tripoli, and widow of Baldwin of Ibelin. They had one known daughter, Eschiva, who married Hugues Sans-Avoir, lord of Le Puy.

A charter from 1204 provides evidence for Eschiva's continued presence within the aristocratic networks of the Latin East. By that date William was already dead, while his brother Hugh remained titular Prince of Galilee.

== Death and succession ==
The date of William's death is unknown, but he died before 1204. His elder brother Hugh died in 1204, after which their younger brother Raoul succeeded to the family's titular claim to the Principality of Galilee.

The genealogy of the Saint-Omer family in the later Lignages d'Outremer requires caution. The work conflates different generations of the families associated with the lordship of Tiberias, and its genealogical information cannot always be reconciled with contemporary documentary evidence.
