= Walter of Saint-Omer =

Walter of Saint Omer
- Prince of Galilee; Lord of Tiberias
- Reign: 1159–71
- Predecessor: William II of Bures
- Successor: Raymond III, Count of Tripoli
- Died: 1174
- Spouse: Eschiva of Bures
- Issue: Hugh II of Saint Omer; William of Saint Omer; Raoul of Saint Omer; Odo of Saint Omer
- Family: House of Saint Omer
- Father: William II of Saint Omer
- Mother: Melisinde of Picquigny
- Religion: Roman Catholic

Walter of Saint Omer (French: Gautier de Saint-Omer; d 1174), also known as Walter of Fauquembergues or Walter of Tiberias, was the son of William II of Saint Omer and Melisinde of Picquigny, and prince of Galilee.

Walter married Eschiva of Bures, princess of Galilee, in 1158 at the instigation of Baldwin III of Jerusalem. They had four sons: Hugh, William, Ralph, and Odo.
