= Siege of Jerusalem (1187) =

Siege of Jerusalem by the Ayyubids

Coordinates: 31.7833°N 35.2167°E

Conquest of Jerusalem (1187)
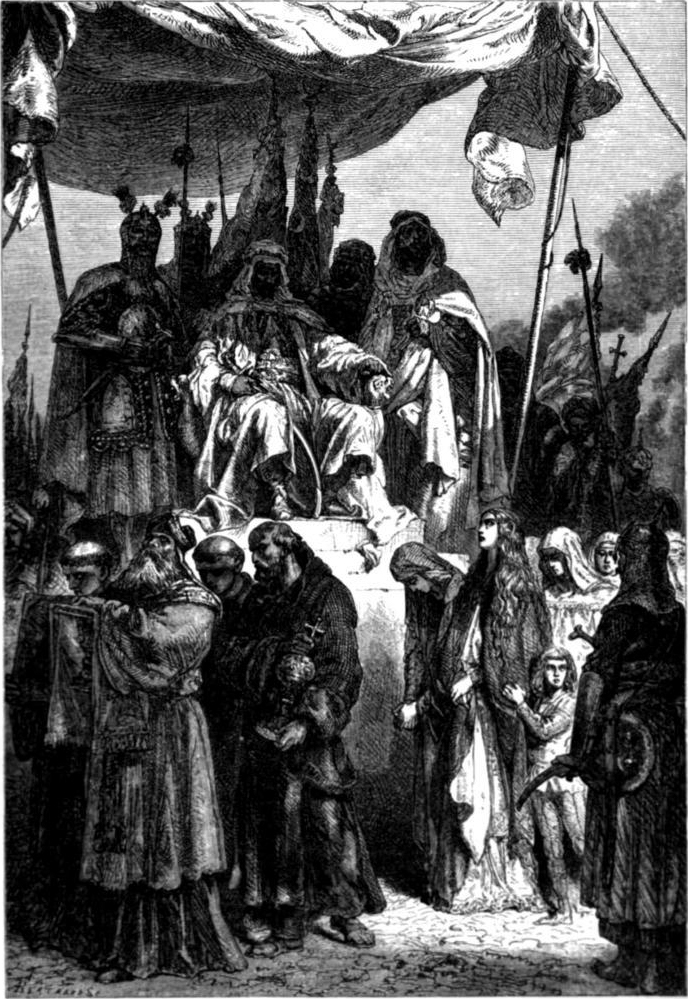
- Saladin and Christians of Jerusalem, illustration by Alphonse de Neuville in François Guizot's "The History of France from the Earliest Times to the Year 1789" (1883)
Date	20 September – 2 October, 1187 (1 week and 5 days)
Location	Jerusalem
Result	Ayyubid victory
Territorial changes	Jerusalem surrendered and restored to the Muslims

Belligerents
Ayyubid Sultanate of Egypt	Kingdom of Jerusalem; Knights Hospitaller; Knights Templar; Order of St. Lazarus; Order of Mountjoy; County of Tripoli

Commanders and leaders
Saladin; Al-Adil I Al-Afdal; Egyptian emirs	Balian of Ibelin (surrendered); Heraclius (surrendered)

Casualties and losses
- 11,000 Christian citizens enslaved

The siege of Jerusalem lasted from 20 September to 2 October 1187, when Balian of Ibelin surrendered the city to the forces of the Ayyubid Sultanate under sultan Saladin. Earlier that summer, Egyptian forces under Saladin had defeated the kingdom's army and conquered several cities. Balian was charged with organizing a defense. The city was full of refugees but had few soldiers. Despite this fact, the defenders managed to repulse several attempts by the Egyptian army to take the city by storm. Balian bargained with Saladin to buy safe passage for many, and the city was peacefully surrendered with limited bloodshed.

Though Jerusalem fell, it was not the end of the Kingdom of Jerusalem, as the capital shifted first to Tyre and later to Acre after the Third Crusade. Latin Christians responded in 1189 by launching the Third Crusade led by Richard the Lionheart, Philip Augustus, and Frederick Barbarossa separately. In Jerusalem, Saladin restored Muslim holy sites and generally showed tolerance towards Christians; he allowed Orthodox and Eastern Christian pilgrims to visit the holy sites freely—though Frankish (i.e. Catholic) pilgrims were required to pay a fee for entry. The control of Christian affairs in the city was handed over to the patriarch of Constantinople.

== Background ==
The Kingdom of Jerusalem, weakened by internal disputes, was defeated at the Battle of Hattin on 4 July 1187. Most of the nobility were taken prisoner, including King Guy. Thousands of Muslim slaves were freed. By mid-September, Saladin had taken Acre, Nablus, Jaffa, Toron, Sidon, Beirut, and Ascalon. The survivors of the battle and other refugees fled to Tyre, the only city able to hold out against Saladin, due to the fortuitous arrival of Conrad of Montferrat.

== Situation in Jerusalem ==
In Tyre, Balian of Ibelin had asked Saladin for safe passage to Jerusalem to retrieve his wife Maria Komnene, Queen of Jerusalem and their family. Saladin granted his request, provided that Balian not take up arms against him and not remain in Jerusalem for more than one day; however, upon arrival in the holy city, Patriarch Heraclius of Jerusalem, Queen Sibylla, and the rest of the inhabitants begged him to take charge of the defense of the city. Heraclius, who argued that he must stay for the sake of Christianity, offered to absolve him of the oath, and Balian agreed.

He sent word of his decision to Saladin at Ascalon via a deputation of burgesses, who rejected the sultan's proposals for a negotiated surrender of Jerusalem; however, Saladin arranged for an escort to accompany Maria, their children, and all their household to Tripoli. As the highest-ranking lord remaining in Jerusalem, according to the chronicler Ibn al-Athir, Balian was seen by the Muslims as holding a rank "more or less equal to that of a king."

Balian found the situation in Jerusalem dire. The city was filled with refugees fleeing Saladin's conquests, with more arriving daily. There were fewer than fourteen knights in the whole city, so he created sixty new knights from the ranks of the squires (knights in training) and burgesses. He prepared for the inevitable siege by storing food and money. The armies of Syria and Egypt assembled under Saladin, and after conquering Acre, Jaffa, and Caesarea (though he unsuccessfully besieged Tyre), the sultan arrived outside Jerusalem on September 20.

== Conquest ==
After a brief reconnoitre around the city, Saladin's army came to a rest before the Tower of David and the Damascus Gate. His archers continually pelted the ramparts with arrows. Siege towers (belfries) were rolled up to the walls but were pushed back each time. For six days, skirmishes were fought with little result. Saladin's forces suffered heavy casualties after each assault. On September 26, Saladin moved his camp to a different part of the city, on the Mount of Olives where there was no major gate from which the crusaders could counter-attack. The walls were constantly pounded by the siege engines, catapults, mangonels, petraries, Greek fire, crossbows, and arrows. A portion of the wall was mined, and it collapsed on September 29. The crusaders were unable to push Saladin's troops back from the breach, but at the same time, the Muslims could not gain entrance to the city. Soon there were only a few dozen knights and a handful of remaining men-at-arms defending the wall, as no more men could be found even for the promise of an enormous fee.

The civilians were in great despair. According to a passage possibly written by Ernoul, a squire of Balian, in the Old French Continuation of William of Tyre, the clergy organized a barefoot procession around the walls, much as the clergy on the First Crusade had done outside the walls in 1099. At Mount Calvary, women cropped their children's hair, after immersing them chin-deep in basins of cold water. These penances were aimed at turning away God's wrath from the city, but "...Our Lord did not deign to hear the prayers or noise that was made in the city. For the stench of adultery, of disgusting extravagance and of sin against nature would not let their prayers rise to God."

At the end of September, Balian rode out with an envoy to meet with the sultan, offering surrender. Saladin told Balian that he had sworn to take the city by force, and would only accept an unconditional surrender. Saladin told Balian that Saladin's banner had been raised on the city wall, but his army was driven back. Balian threatened that the defenders would destroy the Muslim holy places, slaughter their own families and the 5000 Muslim slaves, and burn all the wealth and treasures of the Crusaders. Saladin, who wanted to take the city with as little bloodshed of his fellow Muslims as possible, insisted that the Crusaders were to unconditionally surrender but could leave by paying a ransom of ten dinars for men, five for women and two for children; those who couldn't pay would be enslaved. Balian told him that there were 20,000 in the city who could never pay that amount. Saladin proposed a total of 100,000 dinars to free all the 20,000 Crusaders who were unable to pay. Balian complained that the Christian authorities could never raise such a sum. He proposed that 7,000 of them would be freed for a sum of 30,000 dinars, and Saladin agreed.

== Aftermath ==
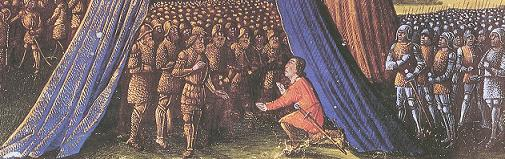
Balian of Ibelin surrendering the city of Jerusalem to Saladin, from Les Passages faits Outremer par les Français contre les Turcs et autres Sarrasins et Maures outremarins, c. 1490

Women and children together came to 8,000 and were quickly divided up among us, bringing a smile to Muslim faces at their lamentations. How many well-guarded women were profaned and women who had been kept hidden stripped of their modesty, and virgins dishonoured and proud women deflowered, and lovey women's red lips kissed, and happy ones made to weep. How many noblemen took them as concubines, how many ardent men blazed for one of them, and celibates were satisfied by them, and thirsty men sated by them and turbulent men able to give vent to their passion.

— Translation of the account of Saladin's secretary Imad al-Din of the treatment of female captives following the siege of Jerusalem

On Balian's orders, the Crusaders surrendered the city to Saladin's army on October 2. The take-over of the city was relatively peaceful especially in contrast to the Crusader siege of the city in 1099. Balian paid 30,000 dinars for freeing 7,000 of those unable to pay from the treasury of the city. The large golden Christian cross that had been placed over the Dome of the Rock by the Crusaders was pulled down and all Muslim prisoners of war taken by the Crusaders were released by Saladin. According to the Kurdish scholar and historian Baha ad-Din ibn Shaddad, these numbered close to 3,000. Saladin allowed many of the noblewomen of the city to leave without paying any ransom. For example, Queen Dowager Maria was allowed to leave the city with her retinue and associates, as was Queen Sibylla. Saladin also granted Sibylla safe passage to visit her captive husband, King Guy, in Nablus.

The native Christians were allowed to remain in the city and Jews were permitted to resettle as well. Those Christians of Crusader origin were allowed to leave Jerusalem for other lands along with their goods through a safe passage via Akko by paying a ransom of 10 dinars. Saladin's brother Al-Adil was moved by the sight and asked Saladin for 1,000 of them as a reward for his services. Saladin granted his wish and Al-Adil immediately released them all. Heraclius, upon seeing this, asked Saladin for some slaves to liberate. He was granted 700 while Balian was granted 500 and all of them were freed by them. All the aged people who could not pay the ransom were freed by orders of Saladin and allowed to leave the city. Saladin then proceeded to free 1,000 more captives upon request of Muzaffar al-Din Ibn Ali Kuchuk, who claimed they were from his hometown of Urfa. In order to control the departing population, Saladin ordered the gates of the city to be closed. At each gate of the city, a commander was placed to check the movement of the Crusaders and make sure only those who paid the ransom left the city. Saladin then assigned some of his officers the job of ensuring the safe arrival of the Crusaders in Christian lands. 15,000 of those who could not pay the ransom were sold into slavery in the Ayyubid Sultanate. According to Imad ad-Din al-Isfahani, 7,000 of them were men and 8,000 were women and children.

On Saladin's orders, the ransomed inhabitants marched away in three columns accompanied by 50 cavalrymen of Saladin's army. The Knights Templar and Hospitallers led the first two, with Balian and the Patriarch leading the third. Balian joined his wife and family in the County of Tripoli. The refugees first reached Tyre, where only men who could fight were allowed to enter by Conrad of Montferrat. The remaining refugees went to the County of Tripoli, which was under Crusader control. They were denied entrance and robbed of their possessions by raiding parties from within the city. Most of the less affluent refugees went to Armenian and Antiochian territories and were later successful in gaining entrance into Antioch. The remaining refugees fled from Ascalon to Alexandria, where they were housed in makeshift stockades and received hospitable treatment from the city officials and elders. They then boarded Italian ships which arrived from Pisa, Genoa and Venice in March 1188. The captains of the ships at first refused to take the refugees since they were not being paid for them and did not have supplies for them. The governor of Alexandria, who had earlier taken the oars of the ships for payment of taxes, refused to grant sailing permits to the captains until they agreed. The latter then agreed to take the refugees along with them and were made to swear decent treatment and safe arrival of the refugees before they left.

After the surrender of the city, the Church of the Holy Sepulchre was ordered to be closed for three days by Saladin while he considered what to do with it. Some of his advisers told him to destroy the Church in order to end all Christian interest in Jerusalem. Most of his advisers, however, told him to spare the Church, saying that Christian pilgrimages would continue anyway because of the sanctity of the place and also reminded him of the Caliph Umar, who allowed the Church to remain in Christian hands after conquering the city. Saladin ultimately decided not to destroy the church, saying that he had no intention to discourage Christian pilgrimages to the site; it was reopened after three days on his orders. The Frankish pilgrims were allowed to enter the church upon paying a fee. To solidify Muslim claims to Jerusalem, many holy sites, including the shrine known as Al-Aqsa, were ritually purified with rose water. Christian furnishings were removed from the mosque and it was fitted with oriental carpets. Its walls were illuminated with candelabras and text from the Quran. The Orthodox Christians and Syriacs were allowed to remain and to worship as they chose. The Copts, who were barred from entering Jerusalem by the Crusader kingdom of Jerusalem as they were considered heretics and atheists, were allowed to enter the city without paying any fees by Saladin as he considered them his subjects. The Coptic places of worship that were earlier taken over by the Crusaders were returned to the Coptic priests. The Copts were also allowed to visit the Church of the Holy Sepulchre and other Christian sites. The Abyssinian Christians were allowed to visit the holy places of Jerusalem without paying any fees.

The Byzantine emperor, Isaac Angelus, sent a message to Saladin congratulating him on taking the city, requesting him to convert all the churches in the city back to the Orthodox church and all Christian ceremonies to be performed according to the Greek Orthodox liturgy. His request was granted and the rights of other confessions were preserved. The local Christians were allowed to pray freely in their churches and the control of Christian affairs was handed over to the ecumenical patriarch of Constantinople.

Saladin went on to capture a number of other castles that were still holding out against him, including Belvoir, Kerak, and Montreal, and returned to Tyre to besiege it for a second time.

Meanwhile, news of the disastrous defeat at Hattin was brought to Europe by Joscius, Archbishop of Tyre, as well as other pilgrims and travellers, while Saladin was conquering the rest of the kingdom throughout the summer of 1187. Plans were immediately made for a new crusade; on October 29, Pope Gregory VIII issued the bull Audita tremendi, even before hearing of the fall of Jerusalem. In England and France, the Saladin tithe was enacted in order to finance expenses. The Third Crusade did not get underway until 1189, in three separate contingents led by Richard I of England, Philip II of France, and Frederick I, Holy Roman Emperor.

== In popular culture ==
- The final part of H.R. Haggard's novel The Brethren takes place during the siege.
- Much of the film Kingdom of Heaven focuses on the siege.
- Turkish series Kudüs Fatihi Selahaddin Eyyubi portraits the situation before and during the siege.
