= Assise =

Stratigraphic unit

In geology, an assise (from the French, derived from Latin assidere, "to sit beside") is two or more beds or strata of rock united by the occurrence of the same characteristic species or genera. In the hierarchy of stratigraphic units, an assise lies between a stage (or sub-stage) and a stratum.
