= Principality of Galilee =

Fief in crusader Kingdom of Jerusalem

- 1099–1187
- Flag

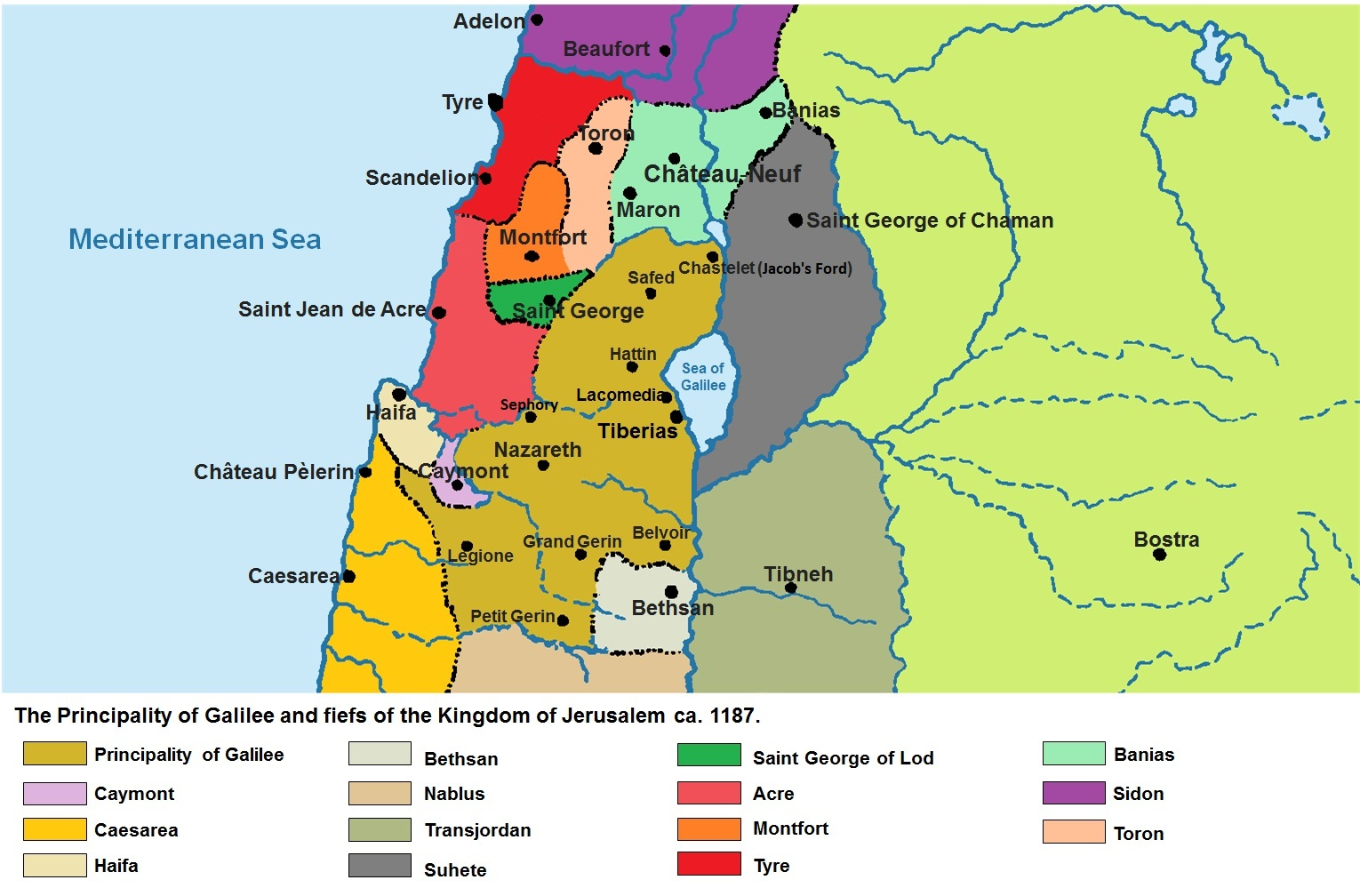
- Galilee in 1187
- Status: Vassal of Kingdom of Jerusalem
- Capital: Tiberias
- Common languages: Latin, Old French, Italian (also Arabic and Greek)
- Religion: Roman Catholicism, Greek Orthodoxy, Syriac Orthodoxy, Islam, Judaism
- Government: Feudal monarchy
- Prince
  - 1099–1101: Tancred
  - 1174–1187: Raymond III
- Historical era: High Middle Ages
  - First Crusade: 1099
  - Conquered by Saladin: 1187
Preceded by	Succeeded by
Fatimid Caliphate	Ayyubid dynasty

The principality of Galilee was one of the four major seigneuries of the crusader Kingdom of Jerusalem, according to 13th-century commentator John of Ibelin, grandson of Balian. The direct holdings of the principality centred around Tiberias, in Galilee proper, but with all its vassals, the lordship covered all Galilee (now Israel) and southern Phoenicia (today Lebanon). The independent Lordship of Sidon was located between Galilee's holdings. The principality also had its own vassals, the lordships of Nazareth and Haifa.

The principality was established, at least in name, in 1099 when Tancred was given Tiberias, Haifa, and Bethsan by Godfrey of Bouillon. In 1101, Baldwin I limited Tancred's power by giving Haifa to Geldemar Carpenel, and Tancred was forced to give up the principality and become regent in Antioch. The principality became the fief of the families of St. Omer, Montfaucon (Falcomberques), and then Bures, and its main seat was in Tiberias; thus it was sometimes also called the Principality of Tiberias or the Tiberiad. The principality was destroyed by Saladin in 1187, although the title was used by relatives and younger sons of the kings of Cyprus (the titular kings of Jerusalem) afterwards, and some of its former holdings were briefly reclaimed by a treaty made during the Barons' Crusade.

== List of princes of Galilee ==
Italicized names are of titular princes.

- Tancred (1099–1101)
- Hugh of Fauquembergues (1101–1106)
- Gervaise de Bazoches (1106–1108)
- Tancred, again (1109–1112)
- Joscelin I of Courtenay (1112–1119)
- William I of Bures (1120–1141)
- Elinand (1142–1148)
- William II of Bures (1148–1158)
- Walter of Saint Omer (1159–1171), first husband of Eschiva of Bures
- Raymond III of Tripoli (1174–1187) with his wife Eschiva of Bures
- Hugh II of Saint Omer (1187–1204)
- Raoul of Saint Omer (1204–1219)
- Eschiva of Saint Omer (1219–after 1265) with her husband Odo of Montbéliard (1219–1247); 1240–1247 as ruling Princes
- Balian d'Ibelin (?–1316), Prince of Galilee and Bethlehem, son of Philip of Ibelin (died 1304) (?–1316)
- Bohemund of Lusignan (c. 1280)
- Guy of Lusignan (c. 1320–1343), son of Hugh IV of Cyprus
- Hugh of Lusignan (1343–1386), son of Guy of Lusignan
- John of Brie
- Henry of Lusignan (?–1427), son of James I of Cyprus
- Philippe of Lusignan (?–ca 1466), son of Henry of Lusignan

== Lordship of Nazareth ==
Nazareth was the original site of the Latin patriarch, established by Tancred. It was created as a seigneury in Galilee in 1115. A Martin of Nazareth, who probably acted as viscount of Nazareth, is documented in 1115 and in 1130/1131.

== See also ==
- Vassals of the Kingdom of Jerusalem

== Sources ==
- John L. La Monte, Feudal Monarchy in the Latin Kingdom of Jerusalem, 1100-1291. The Medieval Academy of America, 1932.
- Jonathan Riley-Smith, The Feudal Nobility and the Kingdom of Jerusalem, 1174-1277. The Macmillan Press, 1973.
- Runciman, Steven (1952). A History of the Crusades, Volume II: The Kingdom of Jerusalem and the Frankish East. Vol. 2. Cambridge: Cambridge University Press.
- Steven Tibble, Monarchy and Lordships in the Latin Kingdom of Jerusalem, 1099-1291. Clarendon Press, 1989.
