= Ralph of Saint-Omer =

Seneschal of Jerusalem (died 1220)

Raoul of Saint Omer, Raoul of Tiberias or Ralph of Tiberias (died 1220) was briefly a claimant to the Principality of Galilee and twice seneschal of the Kingdom of Jerusalem. His parents were Eschiva of Bures, from whom he inherited his claim, and Walter of Saint Omer. She married Raymond III of Tripoli in 1174.

His elder brother Hugh tried arrange a marriage between Ralph and Queen Isabella I and thereby raise him to the throne, after her husband Henry II of Champagne died. This was rejected by the High Court because of his lack of wealth and instead King Aimery of Cyprus married her. Ralph was exiled after an assassination attempt on Aimery in 1198. At his trial Ralph devised a defence from an interpretation of the assise sur la ligece based on the requirement of a judgment in court for cases concerning lords and their vassals. The innovation was applying the Assise to the king himself. Aimery refused and his vassals withdrew service from him following great words and Ralph went into banishment. In later accounts Ralph was credited with a great achievement. He set a precedent applying the assise to the actions of the crown providing himself and his peers with justification, a method of resistance and sanctions that could be legally applied. Equally it is clear that the use the assise sur la ligece had been ineffective. Aimery had refused and Ralph had found it necessary to leave the country.

He went to Tripoli in 1198, Constantinople in 1204.

== Family ==
He married Agnes de Grenier, daughter of Renaud, Lord of Sidon. They had:

- Eschive of Tiberias, married Odo of Montbeliard

== Bibliography ==
- Nader, Marwan (2006). Burgesses and Burgess Law in the Latin Kingdoms of Jerusalem and Cyprus, (1099-1325). Ashgate Publishing Limited.
- Riley-Smith, Jonathan (1971). "The Assise sur la Ligece and the Commune of Acre". Traditio. 27: 179–204. doi:10.1017/S0362152900005316. JSTOR 27830920.
- Riley-Smith, Jonathan (1974). Feudal Nobility and the Kingdom of Jerusalem, 1174-1277. Palgrave Macmillan.

Preceded by Hugh II of Saint Omer	— TITULAR — Prince of Galilee; 1204–1219/20	Succeeded by Eschiva of Saint Omer; Odo of Montbéliard
