= Hugh II of Saint-Omer =

Crusader knight and titular Prince

Hugh II of Saint Omer (ca. 1150–1204) was a Crusader knight and titular Prince of Galilee and Tiberias.

He was the eldest son of Walter of Saint Omer and Eschiva of Bures. After the death of his father in 1174, Eschiva remarried to Raymond III, Count of Tripoli, who thus succeeded Walter as Prince of Galilee. Taken prisoner at the Battle of Marj Ayyun against Saladin in June 1179, he was later ransomed by his mother. In July 1182, he led the forces of Tripoli at the Battle of Belvoir Castle (as Raymond III was ill at the time), helping secure a hard-fought but indecisive victory over Saladin.

In 1187, the Battle of Hattin signaled the end of the Principality of Galilee, and Raymond of Tripoli died soon after; Hugh thus succeeded to his father's title, but merely as a titular ruler. He married Margaret of Ibelin, daughter of Balian of Ibelin and Queen Maria Komnene, but the marriage was childless. At his death in 1204, he was succeeded in his title by his brother Ralph.

The tale of his imprisonment by Saladin was the inspiration of Ordene de chevalerie, the first work on chivalry.

== Sources ==
- Hamilton, Bernard (2000). The Leper King and His Heirs: Baldwin IV and the Crusader Kingdom of Jerusalem. Cambridge University Press.

Preceded by Raymond III of Tripoli	— TITULAR — Prince of Galilee; 1187–1204	Succeeded by Ralph of Saint-Omer
