= House of Ibelin =

Crusader noble family of the 12th to 15th centuries in The Levant and Cyprus

- Nobility
- Ibelin coat of arms.
- Country: Kingdom of Jerusalem; Kingdom of Cyprus
- Origin: Chartres
- Founded: 1141
- Founder: Barisan of Ibelin
- Titles: Regent of Jerusalem; Regent of Cyprus; Seneschal of Cyprus; Constable of Jerusalem; Constable of Cyprus; Count of Jaffa and Ascalon; Lord of Ibelin; Lord of Ramla; Lord of Mirabel; Lord of Nablus; Lord of Beirut; Lord of Arsuf; Lord of Nicosia
- Connected families: Komnenos; House of Blois; House of Lusignan; Ramnulfids; House of Montfort; Hethumids; House of Welf
- Properties: Ibelin castle Arsuf castle
- Dissolution: 1400s
- Cadet branches: Ibelin-Jaffa; Ibelin-Beirut; Ibelin-Arsuf; Embriaco family (matrilinial)

The House of Ibelin was a noble family in the Crusader Kingdom of Jerusalem in the 12th century. They rose from relatively humble beginnings to become one of the most important families in the kingdom, holding various high offices and with extensive holdings in the Holy Land and Cyprus. The family disappeared after the fall of the Kingdom of Cyprus in the 15th century.

== Name ==
The family took their name from the castle of Ibelin, which was built in 1141 by King Fulk and entrusted to Barisan, the founder of the family. Ibelin was the crusader's name for the Arab city of Yibna, where the castle was situated. The castle fell to the Saracens at the end of the 12th century, but by then the family had holdings at Beirut and in Cyprus.

== First and second generations ==
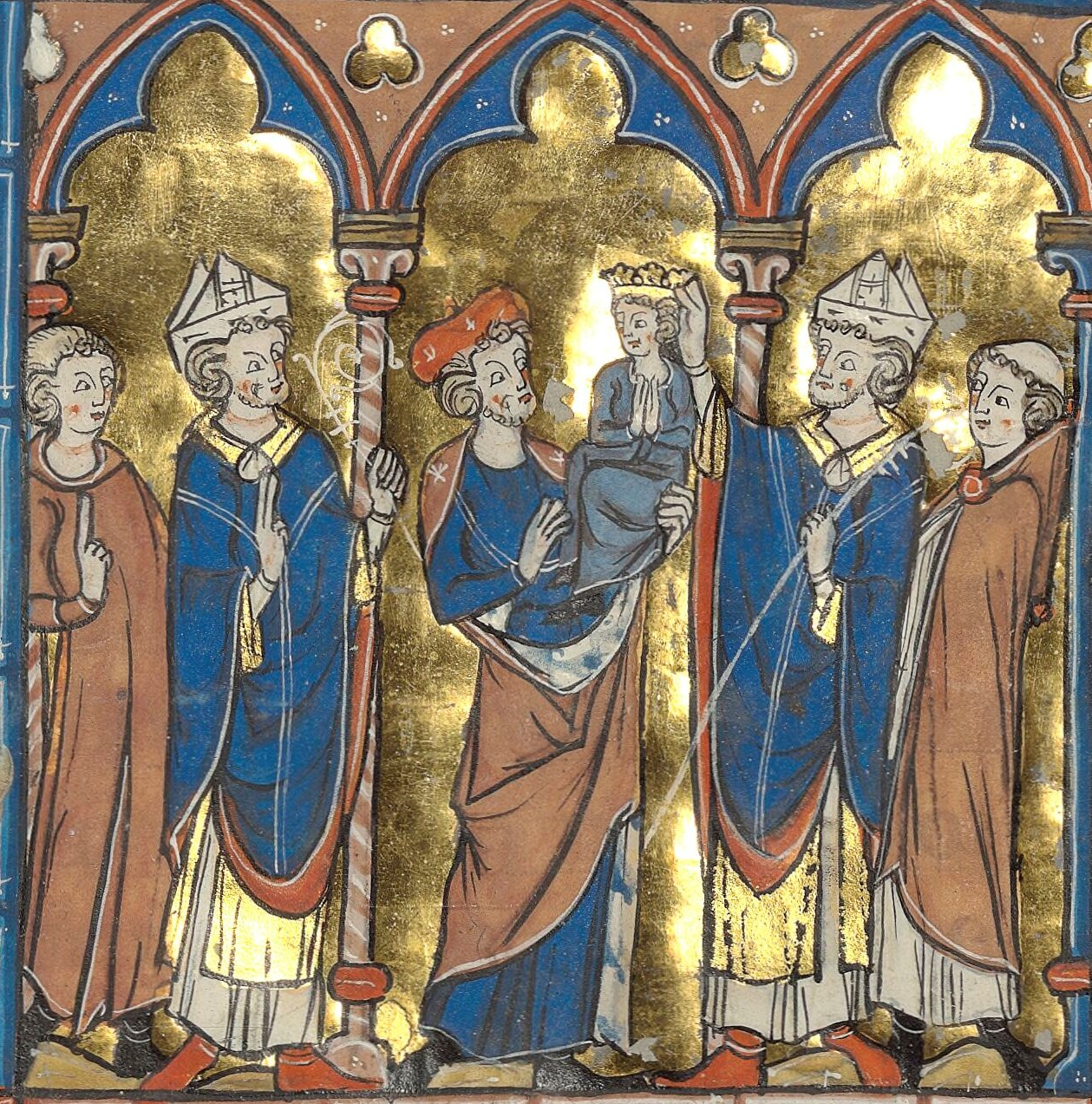
Balian of Ibelin, carrying King Baldwin V

The Ibelin family rose from relatively humble origins to become one of the most important noble families in the Crusader states of Jerusalem and Cyprus. The origins of the family remain uncertain. The Ibelins claimed to be descended from the Le Puiset viscounts of Chartres in France, though Peter W. Edbury suggests this could have been a fabrication and that the family may have originated from Pisa in Italy. According to Jonathan Riley-Smith, however, they may have indeed been connected to Chartres, with the first known member and founder of the house, Barisan of Ibelin, having possibly been a younger brother of Hugh II of Le Puiset, who was made count of Jaffa in 1110; he would then have also been a cousin to the Montlhéry family of King Baldwin II of Jerusalem. Barisan was a knight in service of the Count of Jaffa and in 1115 became Constable of Jaffa. As a reward for his loyalty, around 1122, he married Helvis, heiress of the nearby lordship of Ramla.

Barisan was given the castle of Ibelin in 1141 by King Fulk as a reward for his loyalty during the revolt of his then master Hugh II of Jaffa, in 1134. Ibelin was part of the County of Jaffa, which was annexed to the royal domain after Hugh's unsuccessful revolt. Barisan's marriage with Helvis produced Hugh, Baldwin, Barisan, Ermengarde, and Stephanie. The younger Barisan came to be known as Balian. Along with Ibelin, the family then held Ramla (inherited from Helvis), and the youngest son Balian received the lordship of Nablus when he married Maria Comnena, the Dowager Queen. Balian was the last to hold these territories as they all fell to Saladin in 1187.

The family underwent a remarkable rise in status in only two generations. In the circumstances of the crusader kingdom, this rapid rise, noblesse nouvelle, was not as difficult as it would have been in Europe. In crusader Palestine, individuals and whole families tended to die much sooner and replacements, sang nouveau, were needed.

== 13th century ==
Balian's descendants were among the most powerful nobles in the Kingdom of Jerusalem and the Kingdom of Cyprus. Balian's first son John, Old Lord of Beirut, was the leader of the opposition to Emperor Frederick II when the latter tried to impose imperial authority over the crusader states. The family briefly regained control of the castle of Ibelin in 1241 in the aftermath of Frederick's Sixth Crusade, when certain territories were returned to the Christians by treaty. John had numerous children with Melisende of Arsuf, including Balian, lord of Beirut; Baldwin, seneschal of Cyprus; another John, lord of Arsuf and constable of Jerusalem; and Guy, constable of Cyprus. This Balian was married to Eschiva of Montbéliard and was the father of John II of Beirut, who married the daughter of Duke Guy I of Athens. John of Arsuf was the father of Balian of Arsuf, who married Plaisance of Antioch. Guy the constable was the father of Isabella, who married Hugh III of Cyprus.

Balian of Ibelin's second son Philip was regent of Cyprus while his niece, the widowed Queen Alice, needed help to govern. With Alice of Montbéliard, Philip was the father of John of Ibelin, count of Jaffa and Ascalon, regent of Jerusalem, and author of the Assizes of the High Court of Jerusalem, the most important legal document from the crusader kingdom. John married Maria, sister of Hethum I of Armenia, and was the father of James, count of Jaffa and Ascalon and also a noted jurist; and of Guy, count of Jaffa and Ascalon and husband of his cousin Maria, Hethum's daughter.

Several members of the family went to the new kingdom of Cyprus at the beginning of the 13th century. Most of the rest moved there as the mainland kingdom was lost piece by piece. No members of the Ibelin family seems to have gone to any other country during this period. At this time, some of the Embriaco lords of Gibelet, relatives of the Ibelins, also took the name Ibelin because of their common maternal descent.

Despite the family's modest origins on the paternal side, the Ibelins during the 13th–15th centuries were among the highest nobility in the Kingdom of Cyprus, producing brides for younger sons, grandsons and brothers of kings (though the kings and eldest sons tended to find more royal wives). Ibelins lived among the highest circles of Cyprus, and married into the royal family, the Lusignans, and among such families as Montfort, Dampierre, ducal Brunswick, Montbeliard, and Gibelet(-Ibelins). They married also into other branches of Ibelins. They also had loftier ancestors: Maria Comnena was from the Byzantine imperial Comnenus dynasty, and was descended from the kings of Georgia, Bulgaria, ancient Armenia, Parthia, Persia and Syria.

When the Kingdom of Cyprus was destroyed in the 15th century, the Ibelins apparently also lost their lands and positions, and the family possibly became extinct.

== Lords of Ibelin ==
See Lordship of Ibelin.

- Barisan of Ibelin (c. 1134–1150)
- Hugh of Ibelin (1150–1170)
- Baldwin of Ibelin (inherited Ibelin in 1170, but passed it to Balian)
- Balian of Ibelin (1170–1193)
- John of Ibelin (1193–1236)
- Afterwards held directly by the Counts of Jaffa and Ascalon

== Ibelin heraldry ==
The Ibelin shield shown here was used in the film Kingdom of Heaven, but has nothing to do with the real Ibelin family. While researching shields and coats of arms for the film (which used real and fabricated shields), members of the production team discovered this shield - a red cross on a gold field - in a museum in Paris, with "Balian 1180" written under it. They were delighted, even though it wasn't "their" Balian, and used it as the Ibelin shield, despite it having no historic connection to that family. This information can be found in the Kingdom of Heaven companion book.

Jean de Joinville in his account of the Sixth Crusade mentions the coat of arms of the Count of Jaffa, who at this time was John of Ibelin. De Joinville describes the coat of arms as "or with a cross of gules patée", which roughly translates to "red cross patty on golden ground". That would mean the shield shown here is not that far off from the description given by Jean de Joinville. It remains unclear within the source, if it was the coat of arms of the count of Jaffa, regardless of who was holding that county, or the coat of arms of the house of Ibelin. For Jean de Joinville mentions other Ibelin in his account, but fails to connect them to said coat of arms.

== See also ==
- Officers of the Kingdom of Cyprus
- Officers of the Kingdom of Jerusalem
- Vassals of the Kingdom of Jerusalem

== Bibliography ==
- William of Tyre (1943), A History of Deeds Done Beyond the Sea, trans. E. A. Babcock and A. C. Krey, Columbia University Press
- Edbury, Peter W. (1997), John of Ibelin and the Kingdom of Jerusalem, Boydell Press
- Mayer, H. E. (1982), "Carving Up Crusaders: The Early Ibelins and Ramlas", Outremer: Studies in the history of the Crusading Kingdom of Jerusalem presented to Joshua Prawer, Yad Izhak Ben-Zvi Institute
- Nielen-Vandervoorde, Marie-Adélaïde (2003), Lignages d'Outremer, Documents relatifs à l'histoire des Croisades, Académie des Inscriptions et Belles-Lettres, ISBN 2-87754-141-X
- Riley-Smith, Jonathan (1997), The First Crusaders, 1095-1131, Cambridge University Press
- Rüdt de Collenberg, W. H. (1977–1979), "Les Ibelin aux XIIIe et XIVe siècles", Επετηρίς Κέντρου Επιστημονικών Ερευνών Κύπρου, 9
- Rüdt de Collenberg, W. H. (1983), Familles de l'Orient latin XIIe-XIVe siècles, Variorum reprints, pp. 117–265, reprint of article Les Ibelin aux XIIIe et XIVe siècles.
- Runciman, Steven (1951–1953), A History of the Crusades, Cambridge University Press
