= Ibelin =

Ibelin can refer to:

- Ibelin (castle), a Crusader castle in the Kingdom of Jerusalem
- Ibelin (town), a settlement connected to the castle
- Lordship of Ibelin, the fief connected to the settlement and castle
- House of Ibelin, a noble family of the crusader kingdom, holders of the castle and lordship
- The Remarkable Life of Ibelin, a 2024 documentary

== See also ==
- I'billin, a town in the Plain of Galilee, northern Israel
