= Baldwin of Ramla =

Baldwin of Ramla may refer to:

- Baldwin of Ibelin (died c. 1187), lord of Ramla from 1169 to 1186
- Baldwin I of Ramla (died 1138), castellan of Ramla from 1106 to 1134 and lord of Ramla from 1134 to 1138

== See also ==
- Baldwin (disambiguation)
