= Helvis of Ramla =

Aristocrat of the Kingdom Jerusalem (1110–1158)

Helvis
- Lady of Ramla
- Born: c. 1122
- Died: c. 1156
- Spouses: Barisan of Ibelin; Manasses of Hierges
- Issue: Balian of Ibelin; Baldwin of Ibelin; Hugh of Ibelin
- Father: Baldwin I of Ramla
- Mother: Stephanie of Flanders

Helvis of Ramla (c. 1122 – c. 1158) was the lady of Ramla in the crusader Kingdom of Jerusalem, and a progenitor of the prominent Ibelin family.

== Early life ==
Helvis was probably born around 1122 to Baldwin I of Ramla and his wife Stephanie of Flanders. Stephanie had previously been married to Guy of Milly and already had three sons, Guy, Henry, and Philip of Milly. Baldwin and Stephanie also had a son, Renier.

=== First marriage ===
Helvis married Barisan, the constable of the county of Jaffa, around 1137 or 1138. When Helvis' father died in 1138, she and Barisan inherited Ramla and the castle of Mirabel, until her brother Renier claimed it in 1143 or 1144; presumably this means he was her younger brother and had now reached the age of majority. Meanwhile, probably around 1141, Barisan was granted the newly constructed castle of Ibelin by king Fulk of Jerusalem. This may have been a reward for Barisan's support for Fulk during the rebellion of count Hugh II of Jaffa several years earlier in 1134, but it may also have been intended as compensation for the upcoming loss of Ramla and Mirabel. However, Renier died without children sometime between 1146 and 1148, and Ramla and Mirabel passed back to Helvis and Barisan.

With Barisan, Helvis had five children:

- Hugh of Ibelin
- Baldwin of Ibelin
- Balian of Ibelin
- Ermengarde, who married Elinand of Tiberias
- Stephanie

=== Second marriage ===
Barisan died in 1150 and Ibelin passed to their eldest son Hugh. Helvis soon married Manasses of Hierges, the constable of Jerusalem and a relative of queen Melisende of Jerusalem, who probably arranged the union. Around the same time, Melisende's son Baldwin III of Jerusalem reached the age of majority and claimed his right to the kingdom. When Manasses took Melisende's side in the dispute, Baldwin III besieged and captured Mirabel, and Manasses was exiled from the kingdom. Helvis' sons supported Baldwin III, possibly because they were offended by Melisende's arrangement of Manasses' marriage to their mother and their subsequent loss of access to Ramla and Mirabel.

Despite Manasses' exile, he and Helvis seem to have remained married, as Helvis never married anyone else. With Manasses, Helvis had two daughters:

- Helvis, who married Anselm of Brie
- Isabella, who married Hugh of Mimars

== Death ==
Helvis died sometime between 1158 and 1160. Ramla and Mirabel thereafter passed to Hugh of Ibelin.

== Sources ==
- Hans E. Mayer, "Carving up Crusaders: The Early Ibelins and Ramlas", in Outremer: Studies in the History of the Crusading Kingdom of Jerusalem Presented to Joshua Prawer, ed. Benjamin Z. Kedar, Hans E. Mayer, and R.C. Smail (Yad Izhak Ben-Zvi Institute, 1982).
- Hans E. Mayer, "Manasses of Hierges in East and West", in Revue Belge de Philologie et d'Histoire 66 (1988), repr. in Kings and Lords in the Latin Kingdom of Jerusalem (Ashgate, Variorum Collected Studies Series, 1994).
- Hans E. Mayer, "Studies in the History of Queen Melisende of Jerusalem," in Dumbarton Oaks Papers 26 (1972), repr. in Probleme des lateinischen Königreichs Jerusalem (Ashgate, Variorum Collected Studies Series, 1983).
- Denys Pringle, "The Castle and Lordship of Mirabel", in Montjoie: Studies in Crusade History in Honour of Hans Eberhard Mayer, ed. Benjamin Z. Kedar (Ashgate, 1997).
