= Iblin =

Iblin refers to

- Iblin, Syria, a village in Syria.
- Ibelin, a castle and a family in the medieval Kingdom of Jerusalem.
- I'billin, a village in Israel.
