= Lordship of Ramla =

Crusader vassal state of the Latin Kingdom of Jerusalem

The Lordship of Ramla was one of the lordships in the Kingdom of Jerusalem. It was vassal to and part of the County of Jaffa and Ascalon.

== History ==
During the First Crusade, Ramla was abandoned by its Muslim inhabitants, as it lacked the defenses necessary to withstand a siege.

Upon its capitulation in 1099, Ramla was left under the supervision of Robert of the diocese of Rouen, whom the crusaders installed as bishop of Lydda and Ramla.

Thus, Ramla was initially an ecclesiastical lordship. This would change, however, sometime between 1115 and 1120, when a certain Baldwin is noted as having a "lordlike position" in Ramla, suggesting the city had passed into secular control.

In 1126, Ramla became part of the County of Jaffa, and a separate lordship was created after the revolt of Hugh II of Jaffa in 1134, with Baldwin II as lord (although Baldwin I was not a lord in his own right). The castle of Ibelin was located quite near Ramla. It was later a part of the Ibelin possessions, inherited from Helvis, daughter of Baldwin of Ramla and wife of Barisan of Ibelin. Along with most of the rest of the kingdom, Ramla was recaptured by Saladin in 1187. Though legally distinct, Ramla in practise merged with the other Ibelin holdings regained after the Third Crusade, and in the mid-13th century it was indistinguishable from the larger County of Jaffa and Ascalon.

== Lords/officials of Ramla ==
- Bishop Robert (1099–1106)
- Baldwin I of Ramla, Castellan (1106–1134), Lord of Ramla (1134–1138)
- Barisan of Ibelin (1138–1150)
- Manasses of Hierges (1150–1152)
- Hugh of Ibelin, son of Barisan of Ibelin (1152–1169)
- Baldwin of Ibelin (1169–1186)
- Thomas of Ibelin, son of Baldwin of Ibelin (1186–1188; actually held by Balian of Ibelin, 1186–1193)
- John of Ibelin (c. 1247)

== Sources ==
- John L. La Monte, Feudal Monarchy in the Latin Kingdom of Jerusalem, 1100-1291. The Medieval Academy of America, 1932.
- Jonathan Riley-Smith, The Feudal Nobility and the Kingdom of Jerusalem, 1174-1277. The Macmillan Press, 1973.
- Steven Runciman, A History of the Crusades, Vol. II: The Kingdom of Jerusalem and the Frankish East, 1100-1187. Cambridge University Press, 1952.
- Steven Tibble, Monarchy and Lordships in the Latin Kingdom of Jerusalem, 1099-1291. Clarendon Press, 1989.
