= Vassals of the Kingdom of Jerusalem =

Seigneuries created in 1099

The Lordships of the Kingdom of Jerusalem in 1187

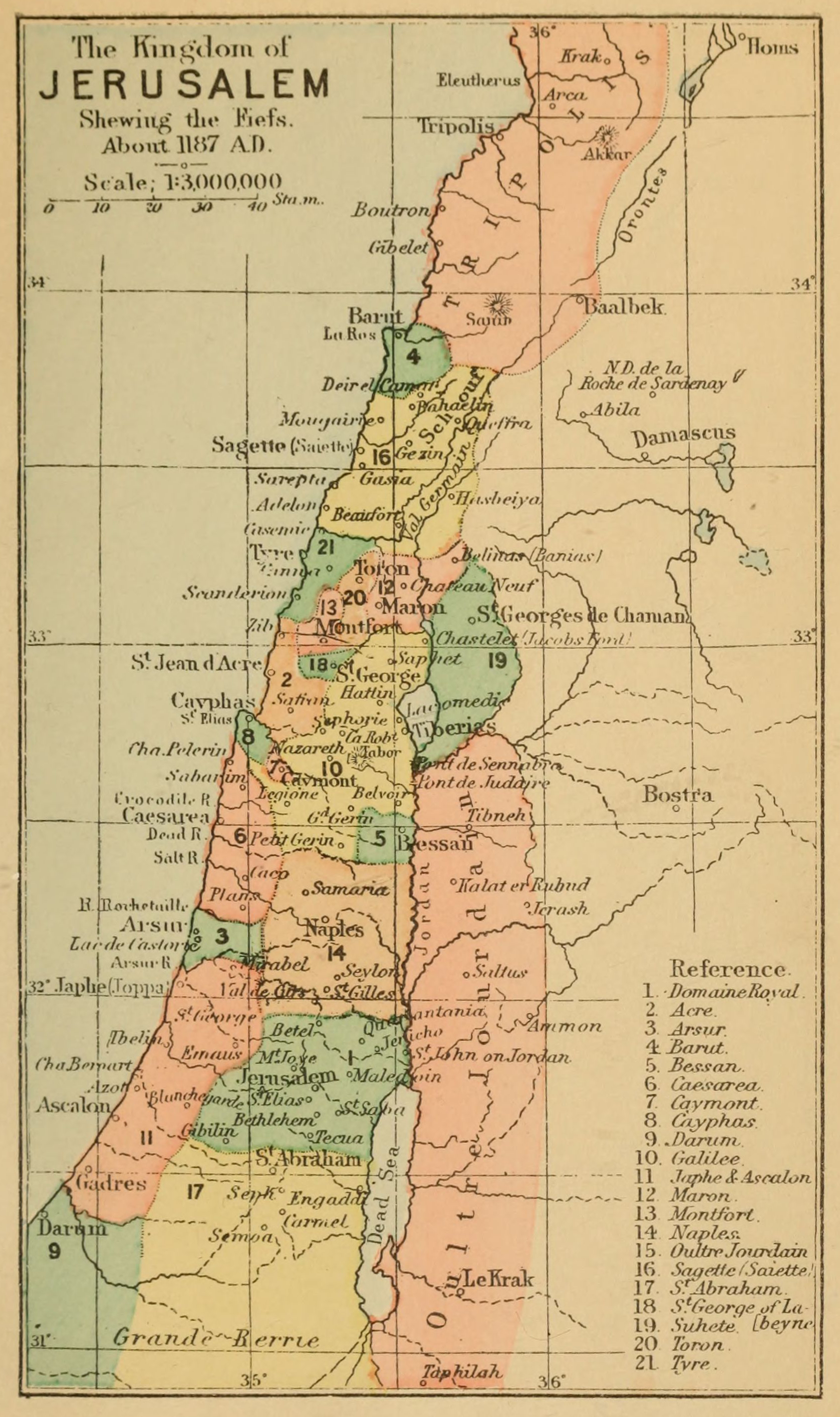
The Lordships of the Kingdom of Jerusalem in 1187, depicted in a map of 1889 by Claude Reignier Conder.

Coat of arms of the kingdom of Jerusalem.

The Kingdom of Jerusalem, one of the Crusader states that was created in 1099, was divided into a number of smaller seigneuries. According to the 13th-century jurist John of Ibelin, the four highest crown vassals (referred to as barons) in the kingdom proper were the count of Jaffa and Ascalon, the prince of Galilee, the lord of Sidon (French: Saete/Sagette), and the lord of Oultrejordain.

There were also a number of independent seigneuries, and some land held under direct royal control, such as Jerusalem itself, Acre and Tyre.

== Inheritance in the Kingdom of Jerusalem ==
Lordships in the Kingdom of Jerusalem were usually hereditary, in principle, but in practice the circumstances were such that their holders did not form long uninterrupted lines of inheritance, which was contrary to the usual patterns of succession in Europe.

In the early years of the kingdom, lords sought out their own territories, and lordships changed hands often. The average lifespan of male lords in Palestine was rather low, due to the constant state of warfare and violence, which led to inheritances by females and/or extinction of whole families.

Succession from father to son happened more rarely than in more peaceful countries in Europe. Female succession opened up the option for the liege or the monarch to reward services, loyalty and capability, as well as achievements, by giving an heiress' hand in marriage and her inherited lordship to a "new man".

A typical succession pattern was a father followed by a daughter, sister, or niece, who was then married to a man worthy of some reward, who then himself succeeded to the territory. This made the succession unpredictable and caused the family holding a particular territory to change once or perhaps even more often in a generation.

Sometimes families became extinct, or left the region, so either a distant relative came to claim their land, or more usually, their liege gave the lordship to another family. Sometimes a lord was condemned for treason, rebellion or some other reason, and he and possibly his descendants were disinherited from the lordship.

Occasionally, vacant lordships became part of the royal domain, but more often, another person was granted the lordship. This might give the impression that the titles were not hereditary, but almost always their succession took place according to feudal rights of inheritance, given the relatively high number of female heirs.

Many of these seigneuries ceased to exist after the loss of Jerusalem in 1187, and the rest of them after the fall of Acre in 1291. They often had Cypriot or European claimants for decades or centuries afterwards; these claimants held no actual territory in the region.

== Northern states ==
Aside from the Kingdom of Jerusalem, there were also three other major Crusader states in the Near East:

- County of Edessa
- County of Tripoli
- Principality of Antioch

These states nominally bore some dependency on the kingdom of Jerusalem. The king of Jerusalem was bound to reconcile them in case of disputes, or between a vassal prince and the Latin patriarch of Antioch, and could claim the regency in case of a vacancy or minority in their successions.

Edessa was perhaps the most closely tied to the kingdom, despite its distance. Its first two counts became kings of Jerusalem, and the county was bestowed as a royal gift on Joscelin I of Edessa.

The County of Tripoli, the nearest of them, is sometimes considered to have been a vassal lordship under the king's suzerainty, although it preserved an extraordinary degree of sovereignty.

Antioch was almost independent, for it was founded already before the kingship and its first holder was a rival of kings, the original leader of the crusade. Later in its history, it would at times recognize Byzantine or Armenian suzerainty, or none at all.

These states dated their documents by the reigns of their own rulers, carried out their own foreign policy, and sent military aid to the kingdom of their own will, rather than through feudal obligation; therefore, they are generally recognized as sovereign and are treated more fully under their own articles.

The Principality of Antioch, County of Tripoli and the Kingdom of Jerusalem were autonomous states.

== County of Jaffa and Ascalon ==
Jaffa, on the Mediterranean coast, was fortified after the First Crusade, and was held by the Le Puiset family until the revolt of Hugh II in 1134. Afterwards, it was usually held directly by the royal family or one of their relatives. After 1153, it became the double County of Jaffa and Ascalon, when the Fatimid fortress of Ascalon was conquered. It passed in and out of direct royal control, and became titular after the loss of the counties to the Muslims in the 13th-century . A number of seigneuries were vassals to the count of Jaffa, including the Lordship of Ramla, Lordship of Ibelin and Lordship of Mirabel.

=== Counts of Jaffa ===
Jaffa was taken by the Crusaders in June 1099 during the siege of Jerusalem and became part of the kingdom shortly thereafter. The counts of Jaffa were:

- Hugh I of Jaffa, first cousin of King Baldwin II, 1110–1118

Albert of Namur ruled on behalf of his stepson Hugh II from 1118 to 1122.

- Hugh II of Jaffa, son of Hugh I, 1122–1134

Jaffa was confiscated into the royal domain in 1134.

- Amalric of Jerusalem, son of Queen Melisende, 1151–1153 (when he reached the age of maturity)

Jaffa merged with newly-conquered Ascalon in 1153, becoming the County of Jaffa and Ascalon.

=== Counts of Jaffa and Ascalon ===
After the siege of Ascalon in 1153, the frontier fortress of Ascalon joined Jaffa in a combined county. The counts of Jaffa and Ascalon were:

- Amalric of Jerusalem, 1153–1163

Amalric became king in 1163. The county was next granted to his daughter on her first marriage.

- Sibylla of Jerusalem, 1176–1186, with her husbands William of Montferrat (1176–1177) and Guy of Lusignan (1180–1186)
- From 1187 to 1191, Jaffa and Ascalon were occupied by the Ayyubids
- Geoffrey of Lusignan (1191–1193), brother of Guy of Lusignan
- Aimery of Lusignan, brother of Guy of Lusignan, 1193–1198

Aimery married Queen Isabella I in 1198, and so from 1198 to 1221 the county was part of the royal domain.

- Walter IV of Brienne (1221–1244), nephew of John of Brienne and grandson-in-law of King Aimery and Queen Isabella I, 1221–1244
- John of Ibelin, son of Philip of Ibelin, Queen Isabella I's half-brother, 1244–1266

Ascalon was again occupied by the Ayyubids in 1247.

- James of Ibelin, son of John, 1266–1268

Jaffa was occupied by the Mamluks in 1268.

=== Lordship of Ramla ===
Originally held by the bishop of Ramla-Lydda, in 1126 Ramla became part of Jaffa, and a separate lordship was created after Hugh II's revolt in 1134. The castle of Ibelin happened to be located quite near Ramla. It was later a part of the Lordship of Ibelin, inherited from Helvis of Ramla, daughter of Baldwin I of Ramla and wife of Barisan of Ibelin. The Lords of Ramla were:

- Baldwin I of Ramla, 1134–1138
- Barisan of Ibelin, 1138–1150
- Manasses of Hierges, 1150–1152
- Hugh of Ibelin, son of Barisan of Ibelin, 1152–1169
- Baldwin of Ibelin, brother of Hugh of Ibelin, 1169–1186
- Thomas of Ibelin, son of Baldwin of Ibelin, 1186–1187
- Ramla occupied by Ayyubids, 1187–1191
- Balian of Ibelin, brother of Baldwin of Ibelin, 1191–1193
- John of Ibelin, son of Balian, 1193–1247
- Lordship held by Counts of Jaffa and Ascalon after 1247.

=== Lordship of Ibelin ===
The Lordship of Ibelin was also created out of Jaffa (in the 1140s, or perhaps as early as 1134 after Hugh II's revolt). The lordship was given as a reward to Barisan of Ibelin, whose wife Helvis of Ramla already owned lands in the vicinity. The castle of Ramla, the family's other inheritance, was nearby, and together these territories formed a wealthy entity. Balian of Ibelin married Maria Comnena, widow of Amalric I of Jerusalem, and the Ibelins became the most powerful noble family of the kingdom, later ruling also over Beirut (see Lordship of Beirut, below). The lords of Ibelin were:

- Barisan of Ibelin, c. 1134–1150
- Hugh of Ibelin, son of Barisan of Ibelin, 1150–1170
- Balian of Ibelin, son of Barisan of Ibelin, 1170–1193
- John of Ibelin, son of Balian, 1193–1236
- Lordship held by Counts of Jaffa and Ascalon after 1236.

=== Lordship of Mirabel ===
Mirabel was separated from Jaffa after the revolt in 1134, and given to Baldwin of Ibelin in 1166, although it was separate from Ibelin. He was succeeded by his son Thomas of Ibelin, ruling from 1186–1188.

== Principality of Galilee ==
The Principality of Galilee was established by Tancred in 1099 and was centered around Tiberias in Galilee proper, and was sometimes called the Principality of Tiberias or the Tiberiad. The principality became the fief of the families of Saint Omer, Montfaucon (Falcomberques), and then Bures. The principality was destroyed by Saladin in 1187, although the title was used by relatives and younger sons of the kings of Cyprus (the titular kings of Jerusalem) afterwards. The principality had its own vassals, the Lordships of Beirut, Nazareth and Haifa, which often had their own sub-vassals.

=== Princes of Galilee ===
The princes of Galilee were:

- Tancred, 1099–1101
- Hugh of Fauquembergues, 1101–1106
- Gervaise de Bazoches, 1106–1108
- Tancred, second reign, 1109–1112
- Joscelin I of Edessa (as Lord of Courtenay), 1112–1119
- William I of Bures, 1120–1141
- Elinand, 1142–1148
- William II of Bures, brother of Elinand, 1148–1158
- Eschiva of Bures, 1159–1187, with Gautier of Saint Omer (1159–1171) and Raymond III of Tripoli (1174–1187)
- Galilee occupied by Ayyubids, 1187–1240
- Eschiva of Saint Omer, granddaughter of William II, 1240–1247, with Odo of Montbéliard (1240–1247)
- Galilee taken by Ayyubids, 1247.

The sons of William II of Bures were titular princes of Galilee after the death of Eschiva of Bures in 1187: Hugh II of Saint Omer from 1187–1204 and Raoul of Saint Omer from 1204–1219. Eschiva of Saint Omer was daughter of Raoul of Saint Omer, and she was titular princess of Galilee from 1219–1240 and 1247 until after 1265. Her husband was titular prince of Galilee from 1219–1240.

=== Lordship of Nazareth ===
Nazareth was the original site of the Latin patriarch, established by Tancred. It was created as a seigneury in Galilee in 1115. The archbishop of Nazareth also ruled over Haifa.

=== Lordship of Haifa ===
Haifa was partly an ecclesiastical domain ruled by the archbishop of Nazareth, and partly created from other lands in the Principality of Galilee. The lords of Haifa were:

- Geldemar Carpenel, 1100–1101
- Tancred, 1101–1103
- Rorgius, 1103–1107
- Pagan, 1107–1112
- Royal domain, 1112–1187
- Haifa occupied by Ayyubids, 1187–1191
- Vivian, c. 1140s
- Pagan, 1190–?
- Rorgius II, ?–1244?
- Garsias Alvarez, c. 1250
- Gilles d'Estrain, c. 1260
- Haifa taken by Mamluks, 1265.

== Lordship of Beirut ==
Beirut was captured in 1110 and given to Fulk of Guînes. It was one of the longest-lived seigneuries, surviving until the final collapse of the kingdom in 1291, although only as a tiny strip on the Mediterranean coast surrounding Beirut. It was important for trade with Europe, and had its own vassals.

Beirut taken by Mamluks in 1291.

The vassals of the lord Beirut were the lords of Banias and the lords of Toron.

=== Lordship of Banias ===
Banias (Caesarea Philippi) was under the control of the Assassins from 1126–1129, when it was given to the Franks following the purge of the sect in Damascus by Taj al-Muluk Buri. The area was in dispute from 1132–1140 when Banias was merged with Toron under Humphrey II of Toron. It fell to Nur ad-Din in 1164, and when recovered it became part of the Lordship of Joscelin III of Edessa (see below).

=== Lordship of Chastel Neuf ===
Chastel Neuf was built by Hugh of Falkenberg around 1105 but was later given to the Hospitallers, until it fell to Nur ad-Din in 1167.

== Lordship of Toron ==
The castle of Toron was built by Hugh of Fauquembergues to help capture Tyre, and was given to Humphrey I of Toron in 1107. The lords of Toron tended to be very influential in the kingdom. Humphrey II was constable of Jerusalem. This grandson Humphrey IV was married to Isabella, Amalric I's daughter. Toron was later merged with the royal domain of Tyre. Toron had two vassals of its own, the Lordship of Castel Neuf, which fell to Nur ad-Din in 1167, and the Lordship of Toron-Ahmud, which was sold to the Teutonic Knights in 1261. The lords of Toron were:

- Humphrey I of Toron, before 1109–after 1136
- Humphrey II of Toron, son of Humphrey I, before 1137–1179
- Humphrey IV of Toron, grandson of Humphrey II, 1179–1183
- Royal domain, 1183–1187
- Toron occupied by Ayyubids, 1187–1229
- Alice of Armenia, granddaughter of Humphrey II, 1229–after 1236
- Maria of Antioch-Armenia, granddaughter of Alice, after 1236–1239
- Toron occupied by Ayyubids, 1239–1241
- Toron merged with Lordship of Tyre, 1241.

Toron itself had a sub-vassal, the Lordship of Maron.

=== Lordship of Maron ===
Not much is known about the Lordship of Maron. It was given in 1229 to the Teutonic Knights in exchange for their claims on Toron.

== Lordship of Sidon ==
The cities of Sidon (Saete/Sagette) and Caesarea Maritima (Caesarea) were captured by the Crusaders between 1101 and 1110. A noblemen Eustace I Grenier, a trussed advisor of Baldwin I of Jerusalem, was granted the lordship of both cities. He founded a dynasty that ruled until the 1260s when they were lost to the conquering Mongols and Mamluks.

=== Lords of Sidon ===
Sidon became part of the Kingdom of Jerusalem following the siege of Sidon in 1110. The lords of Sidon were:

- Eustace I Grenier, 1110–1123
- Gerard Grenier, son of Eustace I, 1123–1171
- Renaud Grenier, son of Gerard, 1171–1187
- Occupied by Ayyubids, 1187–1197
- Renaud Grenier, lordship restored, 1197–1202
- Balian I Grenier, son of Renaud, 1202–1239
- Julian Grenier, son of Balian I, 1239–1260
- Sidon destroyed by Ayyubids in 1249 and Mongols in 1260
- Sidon sold to the Knights Templar, 1260.

=== Lordship of Caesarea ===
Caesarea was captured in 1101 and given to the archbishop of Caesarea. The lords of Caesarea were:

- Eustace I Grenier, 1110–1123
- Walter I Grenier, son of Eustace I, 1123–1154
- Hugh Grenier, son of Walter I, 1154–1169
- Guy Grenier, son of Hugh, fl. 1170s
- Walter II Grenier, brother of Guy, c. 1180s–1189/1191
- Caesarea occupied by Ayyubids, 1187–1191
- Juliana Grenier, sister of Walter II, 1189/1193–1213/1216, with husbands:
  - Guy Brisebarre (possible lord), after 1183
  - Aymar de Lairon, 1189/1193–1213/1216
- Walter III, son of Juliana and Guy Brisebarre, 1213/1216–1229
- John, son of Walter III, 1229–1238/1241
- Margaret, daughter of John, 1238/1241–1255/1265 with her husband:
  - John Aleman, 1238/1243–1264/1265
- Nicholas Aleman, son of John Aleman (possible lord or titular lord), d. 1277
- Caesarea taken by Mamluks, 1265
- John of Nevilles, 1384–?
- John Gorap?

=== Lordship of the Schuf ===
The Schuf was created out of the Lordship of Sidon as a sub-vassal around 1170. It was centred on the Cave of Tyron. Julian of Sidon sold it to the Teutonic Knights in 1256.

== Lordship of Oultrejordain ==
The Lordship of Oultrejordain, consisting of land with an undefined boundary to the east of the Jordan River, was one of the largest and most important seigneuries. It was an important source of revenue, from the Muslim caravan routes that existed there. The last lord, Raynald of Châtillon, received Oultrejordain by marrying its heiress, Stephanie of Milly. Raynald considered himself prince of Oultrejordain, not subject to the king, and was especially hostile to the Muslims. He was largely responsible for Saladin's invasion of the kingdom in 1187. Saladin conquered much of the area in 1187 and personally executed Raynald at the Battle of Hattin. The lords of Oultrejordain were:

- Roman of Le Puy, possibly 1118–1126
- Pagan the Butler, 1126–1147
- Maurice of Montreal, nephew of Pagan, 1147–1161
- Philip of Milly, with his wife Isabella, daughter of Maurice, 1161–1168
- Stephanie de Milly, daughter and heiress, whose husbands exercised the powers of the lordship:
  - Humphrey III of Toron, 1168–1173
  - Miles of Plancy, 1173–1174
  - Raynald of Châtillon, 1176–1187
- Oultrejordain lost to Saladin, 1187.

== Other seigneuries ==
(Titular lords/princes are italicized)

=== Lordship of Adelon ===
The Lordship of Adelon seems to have been created after the center of the kingdom was moved to Acre, and held some influence under Frederick II, Holy Roman Emperor. The lords of Adelon were:

- Adam
- Agnes, c. 1200
  - Thierry de Termonde (died 1206)
- Daniel of Terremonde (died after 1225)
- Daniel II of Terremonde
- Peter, c. 1250
- Jordan

=== Lordship of Arsuf ===
Arsuf, located north of Jaffa, (called Arsur by the Crusaders) was captured in 1101 but remained a royal domain until around 1163 when John of Arsuf became lord. The lords of Arsuf were:

- Royal domain, 1101–1163
- John of Arsuf, 1163–1177
- Arsuf occupied by Ayyubids, 1187–1191
- Melisende of Arsuf, sister of John of Arsuf, 1177– at least 1218, with Thierry of Orguenes (c. 1190s)
- John of Ibelin, husband of Melisende, before 1209–1236
- John of Arsuf, son of Melisende of Arsuf and John of Ibelin, 1236–1258
- Balian of Ibelin, 1258–1261
- Arsuf sold to Knights Hospitaller, 1261
- Arsuf taken by Mamluks, 1265
- Balian of Ibelin, titular, 1261–1277
- John of Ibelin, son of Balian, 1277–1309
- Balian of Ibelin, son of John, 1309–1333
- Philip of Ibelin, son of Balian, 1333–1373.

=== Lordship of Bethlehem ===
- Balian II of Ibelin (died before April 19, 1316), also titular Prince of Galilee.

=== Lordship of Bethsan ===
Bethsan was occupied by Tancred in 1099; it was never part of Galilee, despite its location, but became a royal domain in 1101, probably until around 1120. It occasionally passed back under royal control until new lords were created. The lords of Bethsan were:

- Adam I of Bethune
- Adam II, son of Adam I
- John – after 1129
- Guermond, son of Adam II – after 1174
- Hugh of Gibelet
- Walter
- Adam III
- Guermond II, c. 1210
- Baldwin
- Walter, c. 1310?
- Thibaut

=== Lordship of Blanchegarde ===
Blanchegarde (modern Tell es-Safi) was built by Fulk of Jerusalem in 1142, as part of the royal domain, and administered by the royal castellans. It became a lordship in 1166, when it was given to Walter III Brisebarre, lord of Beirut. The lords of Blanchegarde were:

- Walter III Brisebarre, 1166–1187
- Blanchegarde taken by Ayyubids, 1191, 1192
- Gilles, c. 1210
- Raoul, ?–1265
- Amalric Barlais, 1265–?

=== Lordship of Botrun ===
The Lordship of Botrun was a fief around the city Batrun from 1115. The lords of Botrun were:

- Raymond of Agoult, before 1174
- William Dorel, until 1174
- Cecilia (Lucia), 1174–1181/1206; married Plivain
- Isabella, 1206–1244; married Bohemond of Botron, son of Bohemond III
- William, 1244–1262
- John I, 1262–1277
- Rudolf (Rostain), 1277–1289

=== Lordship of Caymont ===
Caymont was created in 1192 after the Third Crusade for Balian of Ibelin, who had lost his other territories to Saladin. It eventually passed into the royal domain.

=== Lordship of Dera ===
Little is known about Dera, except that it was created in 1118, during the reign of Baldwin II of Jerusalem.

=== Lordship of Hebron ===
Hebron, known to the Crusaders as "Castellion Saint Abraham", was one of the earliest seigneuries created. Hebron had been under royal control at various times before 1149. It had its own sub-vassal, the Lordship of Beth Gibelin, created by Fulk in 1149. Soon afterwards Hebron became a royal domain and Beth Gibelin passed to the Knights Hospitaller. The lords of Hebron were:

- Geldemar Carpenel, 1100
- Gerard of Avesnes, 1100–1101
- Royal domain, 1102–1104
- Hugh of Rebecques, 1104
- Royal domain, 1104–1108
- Walter Mahomet, 1108–1118
- Royal domain, 1118–1120
- Baldwin of Saint Abraham, 1120–1136
- Hugh II of Saint Abraham, 1136–1149
- Royal domain, 1149–1161
- Hebron merged with Lordship of Oultrejordain, 1161
- Under Ayyubid control, 1187–1191
- Royal domain, 1191
- Hebron destroyed by Khwarazmians, 1244.

=== Lordship of Montgisard ===
Montgisard (possibly Gezer) was built as a defense against Nur ad-Din, and was the site of the Battle of Montgisard in 1177. The lords of Montgisard were:

- William, c. 1155
- John
- Aimard, c. 1198
- Reginald, c. 1200
- William, c. 1230
- Robert, c. 1240
- Henry (?)
- Balian, c. 1300
- William
- Baldwin
- Robert
- John
- James, c. 1400.

=== Lordship of Nablus ===
Nablus was first captured in 1099 by Tancred, and named "Naples" by the Crusaders. It later became a separate lordship out of part of Oultrejordain. It was lost during Saladin's conquest of the kingdom. The lords of Nablus were:

- Royal domain, 1099–
- Pagan the Butler, 1126–?
- Guy of Milly, ?–1142 or between 1138–1144
- Philip of Milly, son of Guy, 1142 or between 1138–1144–1161
- Maria Comnena, received the lordship from her first husband Amalric I of Jerusalem
- Balian of Ibelin, 1177, Maria's second husband
- Stephanie of Ibelin, sister of Balian
- Nablus taken by Ayyubids, 1187.

Nablus was technically part of the royal domain, and also had a royal viscount, who governed in place of the monarch. The viscounts of Nablus were:

- Ulric, 1115–1152
- Baldwin Bubalus, c. 1159–1162
- Baldwin, son of Ulric, c. 1162–1176
- Amalric, c. 1176–1187.

=== Lordship of Scandalion ===
Scandelion, today's Iskandarouna in the Tyre District of the South Governorate of Lebanon, was built in 1116 as a royal domain. Denys Pringle quotes William of Tyre indicating the year 1117 for the date when Baldwin I has built the castle of Scandalion. It became a lordship by 1148 when Guy of Scandalion was created lord. The lords of Scandalion were:

- Guy of Scandalion, c. 1150
- Peter
- Raymond, c. 1200
- William of Mandelee
- Raymond
- Philip, c. 1270
- Humphrey, c. 1300
- Eschiva, c. 1370.

=== Lordship of Tyre ===
Conrad of Montferrat practically created this lordship during the Third Crusade by defending it, as it was the only remaining town of the kingdom. Tyre, always an important town, had been part of the royal domain, and after Conrad, it also belonged to the kings personally. After the kingdom moved to Acre, coronations took place in Tyre. Sometime after 1246, Tyre was conferred upon Philip of Montfort by Henry I of Cyprus (then regent of Jerusalem) for his support of the Ibelin (baronial) party against the Imperialists. The grant was confirmed c. 1269 by Hugh III of Cyprus, with a clause allowing Hugh to buy back the lordship. This was exercised in 1284, when the city was given to his sister Margaret, already the dowager lady of Tyre. The lords of Tyre were:

- Royal domain, 1124–1129
- Fulk of Anjou, 1129–1131
- Royal domain, 1131–1187
- Conrad of Montferrat, 1190–1192
- Royal domain, 1192–1246
- Philip of Montfort, 1246–1269
- John of Montfort, son of Philip, 1269–1283
- Humphrey of Montfort, brother of John, 1283–1284
- Royal domain, 1284–1289
- Amalric of Lusignan, 1289–1291
- Tyre taken by Mamluks, 1291.

=== Lordship of Joscelin III of Edessa ===
This lordship, often called the seigneurie de Joscelin, was an unusual creation given to Joscelin III, the nominal count of Edessa, which had been lost long before. It was created around 1176 when Joscelin married Agnes of Milly, and was formed from royal land around Acre. Joscelin had only daughters, who married into the families of von Henneberg and Mandelee. The heirs sold in 1220 the seigneury to the Teutonic Knights, who used the place near Acre as their fortress in Outremer. The archives of the lordship are the only baronial archives of Outremer to survive.

== See also ==
- Crusader states
- Kingdom of Jerusalem
- King of Jerusalem
  - Family tree of Kingdom of Jerusalem monarchs
- Officers of the Kingdom of Jerusalem
- High Court of Jerusalem
- Assizes of Jerusalem
