= Barisan of Ibelin =

Medieval crusader

Barisan

Lord of Ibelin
- Reign: 1141 – 1150
- Successor: Hugh of Ibelin
- Died: 1150
- Noble family: House of Ibelin
- Spouse: Helvis of Ramla
- Issue: Hugh of Ibelin; Baldwin of Ibelin; Balian of Ibelin; Ermengarde; Stephanie

Barisan of Ibelin (died 1150) was the first lord of Ibelin and the founder of the House of Ibelin in the crusader Kingdom of Jerusalem. His name was later written as "Balian" and he is sometimes known as Balian the Elder, Barisan the Old or Balian I. Barisan was also lord of Ramla from 1138 to 1150.

Barisan's origins are obscure. The Ibelins claimed to be descended from the viscounts of Chartres, but Peter W. Edbury suggests this could perhaps be a fabrication and that Barisan may have been from northern Italy. According to Jonathan Riley-Smith, however, he may have indeed been connected to Chartres, as the brother of Hugh of Le Puiset, Count of Jaffa; he would then have also been a cousin to the Montlhéry family of King Baldwin II of Jerusalem.

Nothing certain is known of his life before 1115, when he appears as constable of Jaffa under Hugh. In 1120 he was present at the Council of Nablus, where the first laws of the kingdom were promulgated, perhaps representing the new, underaged Count of Jaffa, Hugh II. Around the same year, his services were rewarded with a marriage to Helvis of Ramla, daughter of Baldwin I of Ramla. In 1134, when Hugh II rebelled against King Fulk, Barisan supported the king, and soon became prominent at Fulk's court. In 1141, perhaps as a reward for his loyalty in 1134, he was granted the newly constructed castle of Ibelin, located in the County of Jaffa between Jaffa itself and the Fatimid Egyptian fortress of Ascalon. It was from this castle that the family took their name.

In 1148 Barisan inherited the nearby lordship of Ramla, through his wife Helvis. That year, Barisan was also present at the council convened at Acre after the arrival of the Second Crusade, at which it was decided to attack Damascus. Barisan died in 1150 and Ibelin was inherited by Hugh. Helvis then married Manasses of Hierges, Constable of Jerusalem.

With Helvis lady of Ramla (daughter of Baldwin I of Ramla), Barisan was the father of:

- Hugh of Ibelin, Lord of Ramla
- Baldwin of Ibelin, Lord of Mirabel and Ramla
- Barisan the Younger (known as Balian), Lord of Nablus
- Ermengarde of Ibelin, Lady of Tiberias, married William I of Bures
- Stephanie of Ibelin (d. after 1167)

== In popular culture ==
A highly fictionalized version of Barisan, renamed to Godfrey, is played by Irish actor Liam Neeson in Ridley Scott's 2005 film Kingdom of Heaven.

== Sources ==
- William of Tyre, A History of Deeds Done Beyond the Sea, trans. E. A. Babcock and A. C. Krey. Columbia University Press, 1943.
- Peter W. Edbury, John of Ibelin and the Kingdom of Jerusalem. Boydell Press, 1997.
- Jonathan Riley-Smith, The First Crusaders, 1095-1131. Cambridge University Press, 1997, as Barisan the Old.
