= Balian of Ibelin =

12th-century nobleman in the Kingdom of Jerusalem

Balian
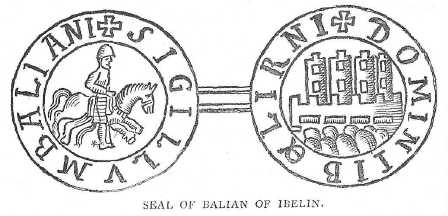
- A drawing of Balian of Ibelin's seal, from The Crusades: The Story of the Latin Kingdom of Jerusalem, by T. A. Archer and Charles Lethbridge Kingsford (London & NY, 1894)

Lord of Ibelin
- Tenure: 1170 - 1193
- Born: c. 1143
- Died: 1193 (aged 49–50)
- Noble family: House of Ibelin
- Spouse: Maria Komnene
- Issue: Helvis, Lady of Sidon; John I, Lord of Beirut; Margaret, Princess of Galilee; Philip, Regent of Cyprus
- Father: Barisan of Ibelin
- Mother: Helvis of Ramla

Balian of Ibelin (French: Balian d'Ibelin; c. 1143–1193), also known as Barisan the Younger, was a crusader noble of the Kingdom of Jerusalem in the 12th century. He was Lord of Ibelin from 1170 to 1193. As the leader of the defense of the city during the siege of Jerusalem in 1187, he surrendered Jerusalem to Saladin on 2 October 1187.

== Early years ==
Balian was the youngest son of Barisan of Ibelin, and brother of Hugh and Baldwin. His father, a knight in the County of Jaffa, had been rewarded with the lordship of Ibelin after the revolt of Hugh II of Jaffa. Barisan married Helvis of Ramla, heiress of the wealthy lordship of Ramla. Balian's name was also Barisan, but he seems to have adapted the name to the Old French "Balian" c. 1175–76; he is sometimes known as Balian the Younger or Balian II when his father is also referred to as Balian. He is also called Balian of Ramla or Balian of Nablus. In Latin his name appears variously as Balian, Barisan, Barisanus, Balianus, Balisan, and Balisanus. Arabic sources call him Balian ibn Barzan which translates "Balian, son of Barzan." His precise year of birth is unknown, but he was of the age of majority (usually 15) by 1158, when he first appears in charters, having been described as under-age ("infra annos") in 1156. After the death of Balian's eldest brother Hugh c. 1169, the castle of Ibelin passed to the next brother, Baldwin. Baldwin, preferring to remain lord of Ramla, gave it to Balian. Balian held Ibelin as a vassal of his brother, and indirectly as a rear-vassal of the king, from whom Baldwin held Ramla.

== Succession disputes ==
Balian supported Raymond III of Tripoli over Miles of Plancy as regent for King Baldwin IV in 1174, and in 1177 the brothers were present at the Battle of Montgisard, leading the vanguard victoriously against the strongest point of the Muslim line. That year Balian also married Maria Comnena, widow of King Amalric I, becoming stepfather to Amalric's younger daughter Isabella. He received the lordship of Nablus, which had been a dower gift to Maria following her marriage to Amalric. Thus Balian along with his brother became the greatest feudatory in the kingdom except for Raymond of Tripoli.

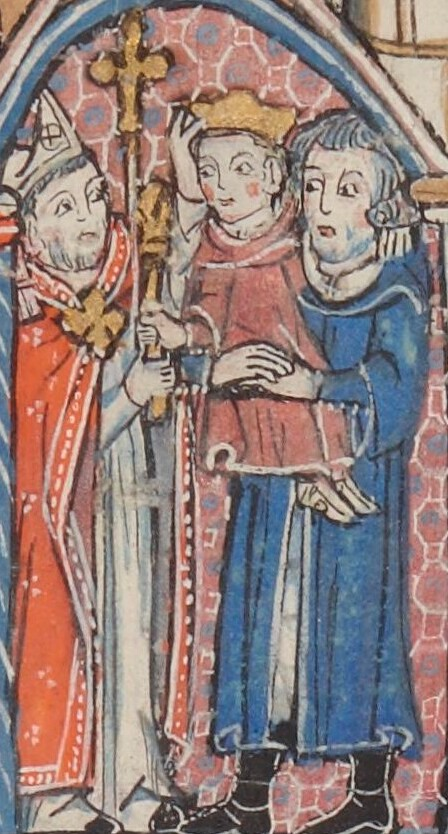
Balian carried Baldwin V on his shoulders at the boy's coronation.

In 1183 Balian and Baldwin supported Raymond against Guy of Lusignan, husband of Amalric's elder daughter Sibylla and by now regent for Baldwin IV, who was dying of leprosy. The king had his 5-year-old nephew Baldwin of Montferrat crowned as co-king in his own lifetime, in an attempt to prevent Guy from ascending. Shortly before his death in spring 1185, Baldwin IV ordered a formal crown-wearing by his nephew at the Church of the Holy Sepulchre. It was Balian himself—a notably tall man—who carried the child Baldwin V on his shoulder at the ceremony, signifying the support of Isabella's family for her nephew. Soon after, the eight-year-old boy became sole king. When he, too, died in 1186, Balian and Maria, with Raymond's support, put forward Maria's daughter Isabella, then about 14, as a candidate for the throne. However, her husband, Humphrey IV of Toron, refused the crown and swore fealty to Guy. Balian reluctantly also paid homage to Guy, while his brother refused to do so and exiled himself to Antioch.

== Dispute between Raymond and Guy ==
Balian remained in the kingdom, as an advisor to Guy. At the end of 1186, Saladin, the sultan of Egypt and Damascus, threatened the borders of the kingdom after Guy's ally Raynald of Châtillon, Lord of Oultrejordain, had attacked a Muslim caravan. Saladin was allied with the garrison of Tiberias in the north of the kingdom, a territory held by Raymond III. Guy gathered his army at Nazareth, planning to besiege Tiberias, but Balian disagreed with this, and instead suggested that Guy send an emissary to Raymond in Tripoli, hoping the two could be reconciled before Guy made a foolish attack on Saladin's larger army. After Easter of that year, Balian, Gerard of Ridefort (Grand Master of the Knights Templar), Roger de Moulins (Grand Master of the Knights Hospitaller), Reginald of Sidon, and Joscius, Archbishop of Tyre were sent on a new embassy to Tripoli.

When on 30 April the delegation had departed Jerusalem, Saladin had already taken the decision to declare war. On 26 April, he launched a third assault on Kerak, once again seizing control of the suburb. In the absence of a siege train, Saladin posed no threat to the castle itself, although he did inflict considerable damage upon the surrounding countryside. Additionally, he directed his son, al-Afdal, who had remained at Ras al-Ma', to lead a raiding party through Galilee with the objective of attacking the lands surrounding Acre. The raid was scheduled for 1 May, coinciding with the date on which the mediators appointed by the High Court had agreed to meet with Raymond III. Reynald of Sidon undertook a separate route to Tiberias, while Balian of Ibelin spent the night of 30 April at Nablus.

The masters of the military Orders and the archbishop of Tyre proceeded to the Templar castle of La Féve, situated a few miles south of Nazareth. On May 1, the Templars and Hospitallers were defeated by Saladin's son al-Afdal at the Battle of Cresson; Balian was still a day behind, and had also stopped at Sebastea to celebrate a feast day. After reaching the castle of La Fève, where the Templars and Hospitallers had camped, he found that the place was deserted, and soon heard news of the disastrous battle from the few survivors. Raymond heard about the battle as well and met the embassy at Tiberias, and agreed to accompany them back to Jerusalem.

== Battle of Hattin ==
Since al-Afdal's army had been allowed to enter the kingdom through their alliance with Raymond, the count now regretted his actions and reconciled with Guy. Guy marched north and camped at Sephoria, but insisted on marching the army across a dry and barren plain to relieve Tiberias. The army had no water and was constantly harassed by Saladin's troops, and was finally surrounded at the Horns of Hattin outside Tiberias early in July. On July 4, the main battle commenced between the Crusader army and Saladin's forces. The Crusaders were organized into three divisions: the advance guard to the east, the main body in the center, and the rear guard to the west. Saladin's army, forming a rough V shape around the Crusaders, had its right flank to the northeast and the main body to the south, with a smoke barrier created by burning brush.

As the battle progressed, the Crusaders faced severe challenges. Their infantry, suffering from dehydration, broke formation and tried to retreat towards the Horns of Hattin. Without their infantry, the Crusader cavalry engaged directly with the Muslims, attempting two attacks to break out of the encirclement. The first attack by the Templars and Hospitallers was unsuccessful, while a second led by Count Raymond initially broke through but was quickly sealed off by Saladin's forces, forcing Raymond to withdraw. The Crusader army became fragmented, and King Guy set up a royal tent at the southern Horn of Hattin as a rallying point. The battle continued into the afternoon, resulting in heavy losses, especially among infantry and Turcopoles, while few knights were killed and nearly all horses perished.

The Templars and Hospitallers suffered the most, with 200 captured and executed for their ferocity. Among the prisoners were King Guy and other noble leaders, while Count Raymond and a few others managed to escape. Balian, Raymond, Reginald, and Payen of Haifa were among the few leading nobles who managed to escape to Tyre. Raymond and Reginald soon left to attend to the defense of their own territories, and Tyre came under the leadership of Conrad of Montferrat, who had arrived not long after Hattin. Balian was to become one of his closest allies. Leaving Tyre, Balian asked Saladin for permission to return through the lines to Jerusalem to escort his wife and their children to Tripoli. Saladin allowed this, provided that Balian leave the city and take an oath to never raise arms against him.

== Defense of Jerusalem ==
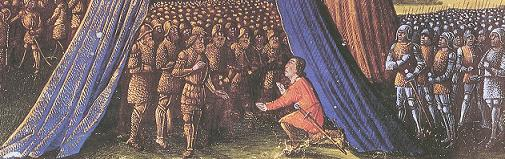
Balian of Ibelin surrendering the city of Jerusalem to Saladin, from Les Passages faits Outremer par les Français contre les Turcs et autres Sarrasins et Maures outremarins, c. 1490.

When Balian and his small group of knights arrived in the city, the inhabitants begged them to stay, and Balian was absolved of his oath to Saladin by Patriarch Eraclius, who argued that the greater need of Christendom was stronger than his oath to a non-Christian. Balian was recruited to lead the defense of the city, but he found that there were under fourteen, possibly as few as two, other knights there, so he created 60 new knights from the ranks of the burgesses. Queen Sibylla seems to have played little part in the defence, and oaths were taken to Balian as lord. With Eraclius, he prepared for the inevitable siege by storing food and money. Saladin indeed began the siege of Jerusalem on 20 September 1187, after he had conquered almost all of the rest of the kingdom, including Ibelin, Nablus, Ramla, and Ascalon. The sultan felt no ill-will to Balian for breaking his oath, and arranged for an escort to accompany Maria and their children to Tripoli. As the highest ranking lord remaining in Jerusalem, Balian, as Ibn al-Athir wrote, was seen by the Muslims as holding a rank "more or less equal to that of a king."

Saladin was able to knock down portions of the walls, but was unable to gain entrance to the city. Balian then rode out to meet with the sultan, to report to him that the defenders would rather kill each other and destroy the city than see it taken by force. After negotiations, it was decided that the city would be handed over peacefully, and that Saladin would free seven thousand men for 30,000 bezants; two women or ten children would be permitted to take the place of one man for the same price. Balian handed over the keys to the Tower of David (the citadel) on October 2. Saladin allowed for an orderly march away from Jerusalem, preventing the sort of massacre that had occurred when the Crusaders captured the city in 1099. Balian and Patriarch Eraclius had offered themselves as hostages for the ransoming of the remaining Frankish citizens, but Saladin had refused. The ransomed inhabitants marched away in three columns. Balian and the Patriarch led the third, which was the last to leave the city, probably around November 20. Balian joined his wife and children in Tripoli.

== Balian as king-maker, and the Third Crusade ==
The fall of Jerusalem, and the death of Sibylla at the Siege of Acre in 1190, led to a dispute over the throne of the kingdom. Balian's stepdaughter Isabella was now rightful queen, but Guy refused to concede his title, and Isabella's husband Humphrey—who had let her cause down in 1186—remained loyal to him. If Isabella were to succeed, she needed a politically acceptable and militarily competent husband, the obvious candidate being Conrad of Montferrat, who also had some claim as Baldwin V's paternal uncle. Balian and Maria seized Isabella and talked her into agreeing to a divorce. There were precedents: the annulment of Amalric I's marriage to Agnes of Courtenay, and the unsuccessful attempts to force Sibylla to divorce. Isabella's marriage was annulled by Ubaldo Lanfranchi, Archbishop of Pisa, who was Papal legate, and Philip of Dreux, Bishop of Beauvais. The Bishop of Beauvais then married her to Conrad (controversially, since his brother had been married to her half-sister and it was uncertain whether he had been divorced by his Byzantine wife). The succession dispute was prolonged by the arrival of Richard I of England and Philip II of France on the Third Crusade: Richard supported Guy, as a Poitevin vassal, while Philip supported Conrad, his late father's cousin. Balian and Maria's role in Isabella's divorce and their support for Conrad as king earned them the bitter hatred of Richard and his supporters. Ambroise, who wrote a poetic account of the crusade, called Balian "more false than a goblin" and said he "should be hunted with dogs". The anonymous author of the Itinerarium Peregrinorum et Gesta Regis Ricardi wrote that Balian was a member of a "council of consummate iniquity" around Conrad, accused him of taking Conrad's bribes, and said of Maria and Balian as a couple:

Steeped in Greek filth from the cradle, she had a husband whose morals matched her own: he was cruel, she was godless; he was fickle, she was pliable; he was faithless, she was fraudulent.

On 28 April 1192, only days after his kingship was confirmed by election, Conrad was assassinated in Tyre. It is said that one of the two assassins responsible had entered Balian's household in Tyre some months previously, pretending to be a servant, in order to stalk his victim; the other may have similarly infiltrated Reginald of Sidon's or Conrad's own household. Richard was widely suspected of involvement in the murder. Isabella, who was expecting her first child (Maria of Montferrat), married Henry II of Champagne only a week later.

Balian became one of Henry's advisors, and later that year (along with William of Tiberias), he commanded the rearguard of Richard's army at the Battle of Jaffa of 1192. Later, he helped negotiate the Treaty of Jaffa in 1192 between Richard and Saladin, essentially ending the crusade. Under this treaty, Ibelin remained under Saladin's control, but many sites along the coast which had been reconquered during the crusade were allowed to remain in Christian hands. After Richard departed, Saladin compensated Balian with the castle of Caymont and five other nearby sites, all outside Acre.

== Legacy ==
Balian died in 1193, in his early fifties. With Maria Komnene he had four children:

- Helvis of Ibelin, who married (1) Reginald of Sidon; (2) Guy of Montfort.
- John of Ibelin, Lord of Beirut and constable of Jerusalem, and regent for his niece Maria of Montferrat, Queen of Jerusalem. He married (1) Helvis of Nephin; (2) Melisende of Arsuf.
- Margaret, who married (1) Hugh II of Saint Omer (stepson of Raymond III of Tripoli); (2) Walter III of Cæsarea.
- Philip of Ibelin, Regent of Cyprus, who married Alice of Montbéliard, and sired John of Ibelin, Count of Jaffa and Ascalon

Balian's squire Ernoul, who was with him on the embassy to Tripoli in 1187, wrote parts of the Old French continuation of the Latin chronicle of William of Tyre (William had died in 1186, before the fall of Jerusalem). Although this family of manuscripts now often bears his name, his account survives in only fragments within it, mainly for the period 1186–88, with a heavy bias in favour of the Ibelin family. Balian became a common name in the Ibelin family in the 13th century. Balian, lord of Beirut, son of John and grandson of the above Balian, succeeded his father as lord of Beirut in 1236. Balian of Beirut's brother, also named John, had a son named Balian; this Balian was lord of Arsuf and married Plaisance of Antioch. The name also passed into the family of the Greniers of Sidon, since Balian's daughter Helvis and Reginald of Sidon named their son Balian.

== Popular culture ==
- A highly fictionalized version of Balian, played by English actor Orlando Bloom, is the protagonist of Ridley Scott's 2005 film Kingdom of Heaven.
- In Kudüs Fatihi Selahaddin Eyyubi, Balian was portrayed by Mehmet Ozan Dolunay.

== Sources ==
- Eddé, Anne-Marie (2011). Saladin. Cambridge, Mass.: Belknap Press. ISBN 9780674055599.
- Nicolle, David (1993). Hattin 1187, Saladin's Greatest Victory. London: Osprey. ISBN 1-85532-284-6.
- Baldwin, Whithed (1936). Raymond III of Tripolis and The Fall of Jerusalem (1140-1187). Princeton: Princeton University Press.
- Hamilton, Bernard (2000). The Leper King And His Heirs. Cambridge: Cambridge University Press. ISBN 978-0-521-64187-6.
- Brundage, James A. "De Expugnatione Terrae Sanctae per Saladinum". The Crusades: A Documentary Survey. Chicago: Barakaldo Books. ISBN 9781839743283.
- of Tyre, William (1941). Atwater Babcock, Emily; Krey, August C. (eds.). A History of Deeds Done Beyond the Sea. New York: Octagon Books. ISBN 9780374903206.
- Mas Latrie, Louis de (1871). Chronique d'Ernoul et de Bernard le Trésorier. Paris: Renouard. OCLC 952491978.
- Ruth Morgan, Margaret, ed. (1982). La Continuation de Guillaume de Tyr (1184–1192). Paris: P. Geuthner. ISBN 9782705301910.
- Ailes, Marianne; Barber, Malcolm, eds. (2011). The history of the Holy War : Ambroise's "Estoire de la Guerre Sainte. Woodbridge: The Boydell Press. ISBN 9781843836629.
- Nicholson, Helen J., ed. (2005). Chronicle of the Third Crusade. Aldershot: Ashgate. ISBN 9780754605812.
- Peter W. Edbury, The Conquest of Jerusalem and the Third Crusade: Sources in Translation. Ashgate, 1996.
- Edbury, Peter W. (1997). John of Ibelin and the Kingdom of Jerusalem. Woodbridge: Boydell Press. ISBN 9780851157030.
- Maalouf, Amin (1984). The Crusades Through Arab Eyes. London: Al Saqi. ISBN 9780863561139.
- Prâwer, Yehôšuà; Kedar, Benjamin Z. "Carving Up Crusaders: The Early Ibelins and Ramlas". Outremer: Studies in the history of the Crusading Kingdom of Jerusalem presented to Joshua Prawer. Jerusalem: Yad Izhak Ben-Zvi Institute. OCLC 260139594.
- Pirie-Gordon, H. (1912). "The Reigning Princes of Galilee". The English Historical Review. XXVII (CVII, July). Oxford Academic: 445–461. doi:10.1093/ehr/XXVII.CVII.445.
- Runciman, Steven (1952). A History of the Crusades, Volume II: The Kingdom of Jerusalem and the Frankish East. Cambridge: Cambridge University Press.

Preceded by Baldwin of Ibelin	Lordship of Ibelin c. 1170–1187	Succeeded by conquered by Saladin
Preceded by Maria Comnena	Lordship of Nablus; 1177–1187 (with Maria Comnena)	Succeeded by conquered by Saladin
Preceded by Royal domain	Lordship of Caymont; 1192–1193	Succeeded by John of Ibelin?
