= Hugh of Ibelin =

Crusader noble (c. 1132–1169/71)

Hugh

Lord of Ibelin and Ramla
- Tenure: 1152 - 1169
- Predecessor: Barisan of Ibelin
- Successor: Baldwin of Ibelin
- Born: c. 1130–1133
- Died: 1169/1171
- Noble family: House of Ibelin
- Spouse: Agnes of Courtenay
- Father: Barisan of Ibelin
- Mother: Helvis of Ramla

Hugh of Ibelin (c. 1132 – 1169/1171) was an important noble in the Kingdom of Jerusalem and was Lord of Ramla from 1152-1169.

Hugh was the eldest son of Barisan of Ibelin and Helvis of Ramla. He was old enough to witness charters in 1148, as was his younger brother Baldwin of Ibelin, which suggests he was born c. 1130-1133, as the male age of majority was fifteen. (H.E. Mayer has suggested a limited degree of competence may have been accepted from the age of eight, reducing his age, but the examples given of this are of males of the royal house, whose situation was somewhat different.) He was probably about ten years older than his youngest brother, Balian of Ibelin.

After his father Barisan died in 1150, Helvis married the constable of Jerusalem, Manasses of Hierges, who was one of the strongest supporters of Queen Melisende in the power struggle against her son King Baldwin III. Manasses was exiled in 1152 when Baldwin was victorious in this struggle, allowing Hugh to inherit Ramla from his mother. Hugh took part in the Siege of Ascalon in 1153, and in 1157 was captured in battle at Banias, being released probably the next year. In 1159 he visited the Principality of Antioch and met with Byzantine emperor Manuel I Comnenus, who had arrived to assert his suzerainty over the principality. In 1163 Hugh married Agnes of Courtenay (1133 – 1184/1185), the former wife of King Amalric, by whom he had no issue. It is possible that Agnes had already been betrothed or married to him before 1157, some say it was the actual marriage but she married Amalric after Hugh was taken prisoner; Amalric was forced to divorce her before becoming king in 1163.

Hugh participated Amalric's expedition to Egypt in 1167, and was responsible for building a bridge over the Nile. The crusaders allied with the sultan against Shirkuh, the general of Nur ad-Din Zangi who was also fighting for control of Egypt, and Hugh was sent to protect Cairo along with the sultan's son Kamil. Hugh was the first crusader ever to see the sultan's palace. At the siege of Bilbeis during the same Egyptian campaign, according to Ibelin family tradition, Hugh's life was saved by Philip of Milly after breaking his leg and falling under his horse. Hugh died around 1169 during a pilgrimage to Santiago de Compostela. His territories of Ibelin and Ramla passed to his brother Baldwin.

Another Hugh of Ibelin was the son of John of Ibelin, the Old Lord of Beirut, and the grand-nephew of this Hugh.

== Sources ==
- William of Tyre, A History of Deeds Done Beyond the Sea. E. A. Babcock and A. C. Krey, trans. Columbia University Press, 1943.
- Peter W. Edbury, John of Ibelin and the Kingdom of Jerusalem. Boydell Press, 1997.
- H. E. Mayer, "Carving Up Crusaders: The Early Ibelins and Ramlas", in Outremer: Studies in the history of the Crusading Kingdom of Jerusalem presented to Joshua Prawer. Yad Izhak Ben-Zvi Institute, 1982.
- Steven Runciman, A History of the Crusades, vol. II: The Kingdom of Jerusalem. Cambridge University Press, 1952.
