= Baldwin I of Ramla =

Baldwin I (died 1138) was the castellan and lord of Ramla in the Kingdom of Jerusalem from 1106 to his death. In 1120, he participated in the Council of Nablus. In 1126, the castellany, which controlled the surrounding countryside too, was given in fief to the Count of Jaffa. In 1134, Jaffa was confiscated to the king after the rebellion of Hugh II and Ramla was given to Baldwin, to hold from the count of Jaffa.

Baldwin has been identified with Baldwin of Hestrut, a knight who appears in the Latin East for the first time between 1102 and 1105. The sudden disappearance of Baldwin after this date could be attributed to his receiving the castellany of Ramla and adopting it as his surname.

By his wife Stephanie of Nablus, Baldwin had two children:

- Renier
- Helvis, married (probably in 1120, around and before 1122) Barisan of Ibelin, then (1151) Manasses of Hierges

== Sources ==
- Murray, Alan V. The Crusader Kingdom of Jerusalem, a dynastic history 1099-1125. Oxford University Press: 2000.
