= Baldwin of Ibelin =

Crusader noble of the 12th-century

- Coat of arms of the House of Ibelin

Lord of Ramla
- Reign: 1169 – 1186
- Predecessor: Hugh of Ibelin
- Born: early 1130s
- Died: c. 1187 or 1186/1188
- Noble family: House of Ibelin
- Spouses: Richilde de Bethsan; Isabelle or Elizabeth Gothman; Marie, daughter of Renier
- Issue: Thomas; Stephanie; Eschive d'Ibelin
- Father: Barisan of Ibelin
- Mother: Helvis of Ramla

Baldwin of Ibelin, also known as Baldwin II of Ramla (French: Baudouin d'Ibelin, early 1130s – c. 1187 or 1186/1188), was an important noble of the Kingdom of Jerusalem in the 12th century and was lord of Ramla from 1169–1186. He was the second son of Barisan of Ibelin, and was the younger brother of Hugh of Ibelin and older brother of Balian of Ibelin. He first appears in the historical record as a witness to charters in 1148.

In 1156, Baldwin may have planned to kill Ahmad ib. Muhammad ibn Qudama of Jamma'in. Ahmad's sermons had been gaining support throughout the region but after being warned of the threat against his life, he fled to Damascus, followed by other members of the Hanbali group.

After the death of his eldest brother Hugh (third husband of Agnes of Courtenay) in 1169, the castle of Ibelin passed to Baldwin, who remained Lord of Mirabel and Ramla and passed Ibelin to his younger brother Balian. He introduced the Lusignan family to court in 1174, in the person of Aimery, who had married his daughter Eschiva. Baldwin and Balian supported Count Raymond III of Tripoli over Miles of Plancy as regent for King Baldwin IV in 1174, and in 1177 the brothers were present at the Battle of Montgisard.

It is suspected that, after the death of his second wife Isabella, in 1177, he became Raymond of Tripoli's favoured candidate to marry King Baldwin IV's widowed sister, Sibylla. His brother Balian had recently married Baldwin IV and Sibylla's stepmother, Queen Maria Comnena. The Chronicle of Ernoul, or Old French Continuation of William of Tyre, partly written by a former squire of Balian, but thirteenth-century in its current form, claims that Baldwin and Sibylla had been in love and exchanged letters during Baldwin's captivity, but this is highly questionable.

Baldwin was captured in battle at Marj Uyun in 1179, along with Odo de St Amand, Grand Master of the Templars, and Raymond of Tripoli's stepson, Hugh of Tiberias. Baldwin was ransomed by Byzantine emperor Manuel I Comnenus, and later in 1180 he visited Constantinople. Supposedly, the emperor sat him in a chair and covered him up to his head in the gold coins that were to be used as his ransom money. During his stay in Constantinople, the emperor died. Baldwin was in Jerusalem at the time of Sibylla's wedding in 1180. Raymond of Tripoli seems to have been planning a coup to marry Sibylla to Baldwin, but the king needed to marry her to a non-native, in order gain support for another crusade from the west. She was married to Guy of Lusignan, younger brother of Baldwin of Ibelin's son-in-law Aimery. That same year, the king betrothed his younger half-sister Isabella, Balian's stepdaughter, to Humphrey IV of Toron, to further reduce the Ibelins' influence.

In 1183 he supported Raymond against Guy, who was by now regent for the ailing Baldwin IV. Lord Baldwin was among the barons who advised the king to crown Sibylla's son Baldwin V in 1183, while Baldwin IV was still alive; this was an attempt to prevent Guy from succeeding as king. Baldwin V became sole king while still a child in 1185, and when the young king died in 1186, Sibylla was crowned queen with Guy as her consort. The Ibelins and Raymond favoured the accession of Isabella, but Humphrey refused to be crowned and cause a civil war, and instead swore allegiance to Sibylla and Guy. All the other barons of the kingdom paid homage to Guy as well, except for Raymond and Baldwin. Baldwin placed his young son Thomas under the care of his brother Balian, and exiled himself to the Principality of Antioch, where he was welcomed with great fanfare.

Baldwin considered Guy "a madman and a fool", and refused to pay homage because his father had not paid homage to Guy's father (i.e., regarding Guy as an upstart incomer, where Baldwin was a native baron). He refused to return to Jerusalem to assist Guy against Saladin, and probably died in his self-imposed exile in 1187.

== Family ==
Baldwin of Ibelin married three times. His wives were:

1. Richilda of Bethsan, before or in 1157, divorced and annulled 1174. They had three children:

- Thomas (before 1175 – in or c. 1188), Lord of Ramla, unmarried and without issue
- Stephanie, married Amand, Viscount of Nablus
- Eschiva (died around 1196/1197), married Aimery of Lusignan before October 29, 1175; mother of Hugh I of Cyprus

2. Isabelle or Elizabeth Goman, (widow of Hugh Grenier, Lord of Caesarea), married 1175, d. 1177 or 1178, no surviving issue.

3. Marie, daughter of Renier, Constable of Tripoli, m. after April, 1180, d. after 1228, no surviving issue.

Another Baldwin of Ibelin was the son of this Baldwin's nephew John of Ibelin, the Old Lord of Beirut.

== Sources ==
- William of Tyre, A History of Deeds Done Beyond the Sea. E. A. Babcock and A. C. Krey, trans. Columbia University Press, 1943.
- Peter W. Edbury, The Conquest of Jerusalem and the Third Crusade: Sources in Translation. Ashgate, 1996.
- Peter W. Edbury, John of Ibelin and the Kingdom of Jerusalem. Boydell Press, 1997.
- Bernard Hamilton, The Leper King and his Heirs. Cambridge University Press, 2000.
- H. E. Mayer, "Carving Up Crusaders: The Early Ibelins and Ramlas", in Outremer: Studies in the history of the Crusading Kingdom of Jerusalem presented to Joshua Prawer. Yad Izhak Ben-Zvi Institute, 1982.
- Steven Runciman, A History of the Crusades, vol. II: The Kingdom of Jerusalem. Cambridge University Press, 1952.
