= Majdal Yaba =

Majdal Yaba مجدل يابا Majdal al-Sadiq, Majdal Yafa
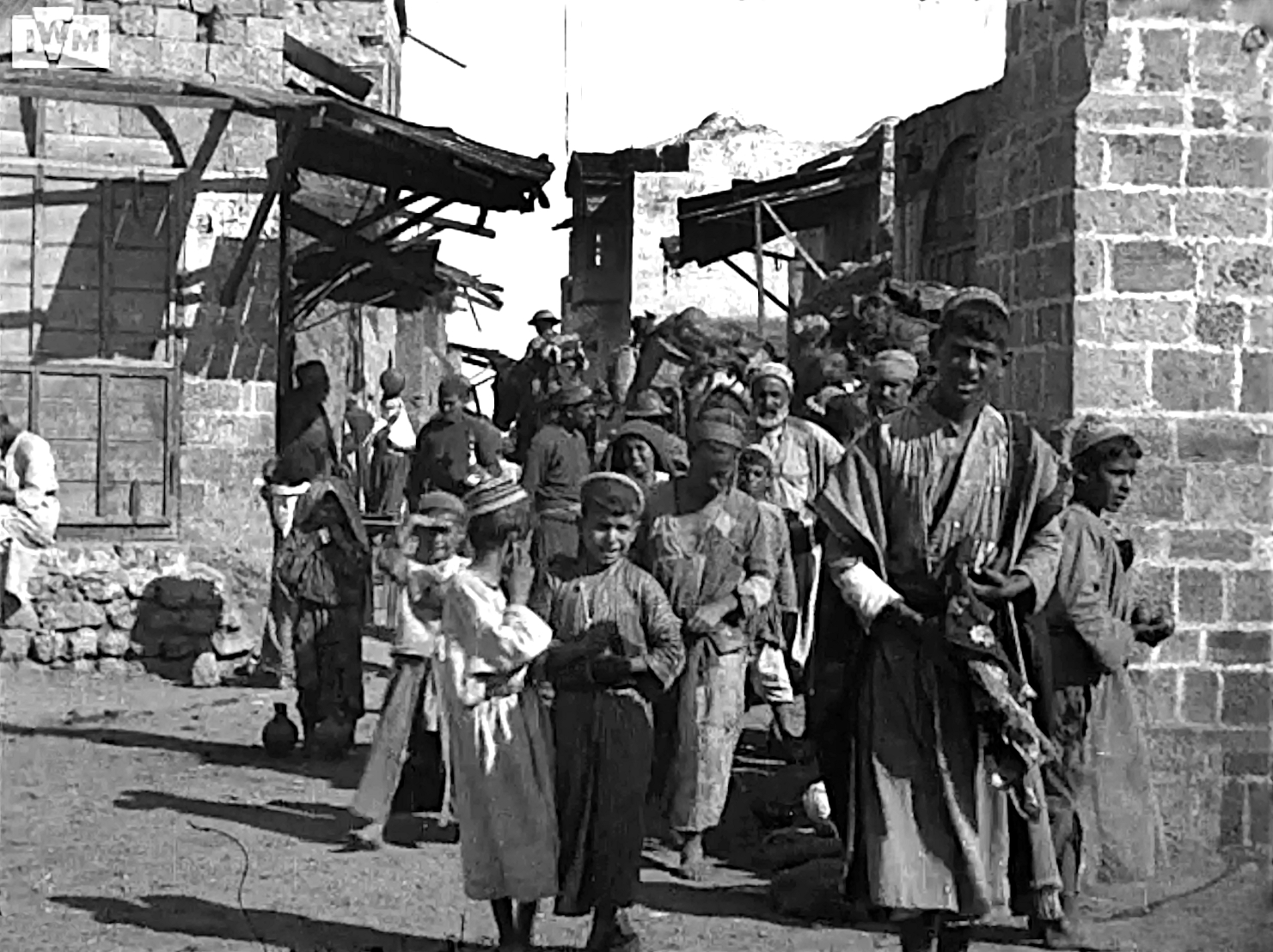
- A street in the Palestinian village of Majdal Yaba, November 1917
- Etymology: "Tower of [our] Father" or "Tower of Yafa" and later "Tower of Sadiq" or "The watch-tower of Yâba"
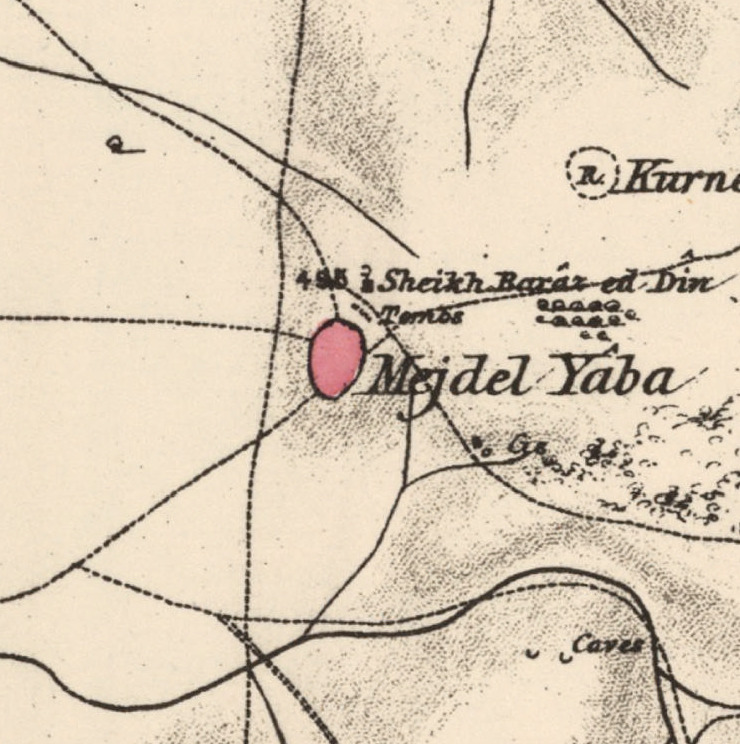
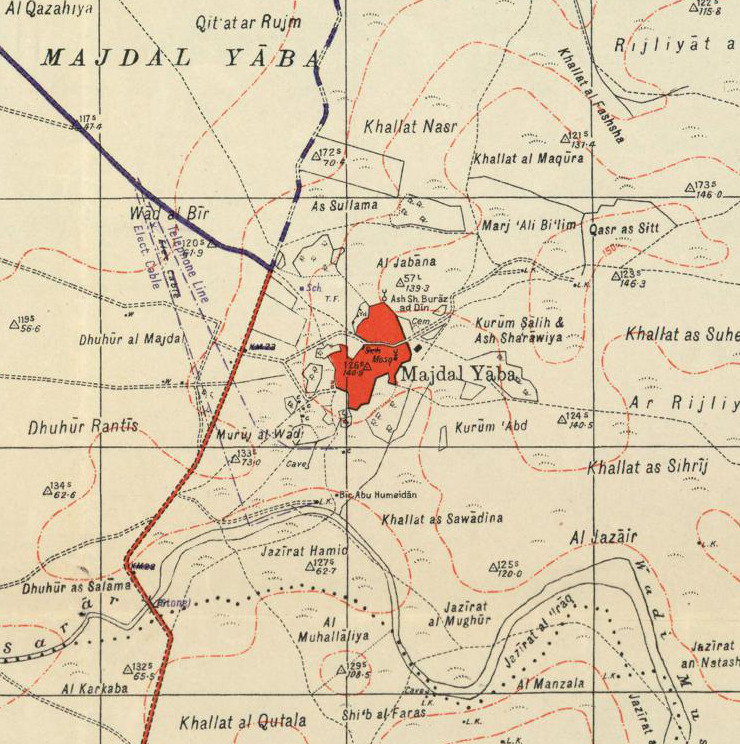
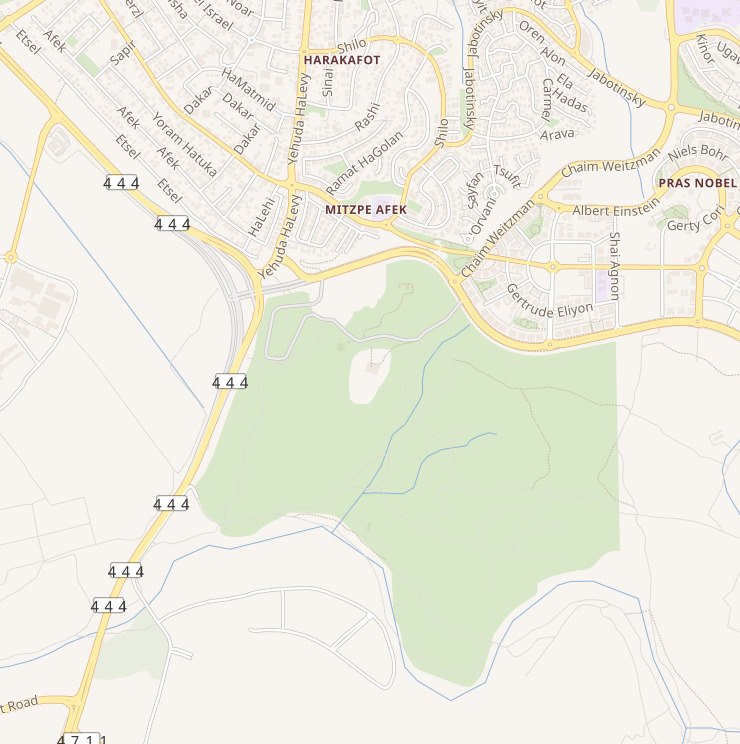
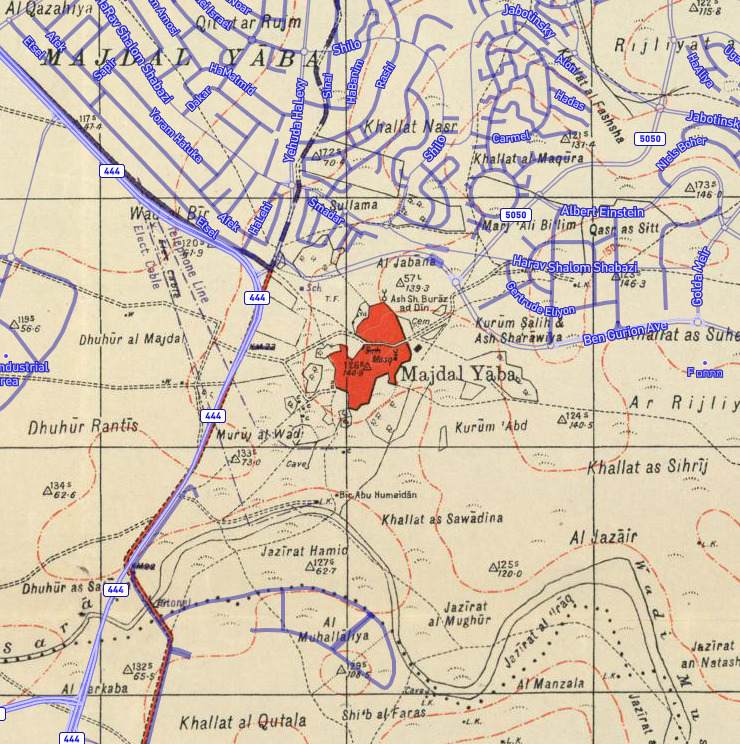
- 1870s map 1940s map modern map 1940s with modern overlay map A series of historical maps of the area around Majdal Yaba (click the buttons)

- Location within Mandatory Palestine
- Coordinates: 32°04′51.04″N 34°57′24.97″E
- Palestine grid: 146/165
- Geopolitical entity: Mandatory Palestine
- Subdistrict: Ramle
- Date of depopulation: July 10, 1948

Area
  - Total: 26,332 dunams (26.332 km^{2}; 10.167 sq mi)

Population (1945)
  - Total: 1,520
- Cause(s) of depopulation: Military assault by Yishuv forces
- Current Localities: Enat, Rosh HaAyin, Givat HaShlosha, Nahshonim, Migdal Afek

Majdal Yaba (Arabic: مجدل يابا) was a Palestinian Arab village in the Ramle Subdistrict, 18.5 kilometres (11.5 mi) northeast of Ramla and 4 kilometres (2.5 mi) east of Jaffa. A walled Jewish settlement name Migdal Aphek (Hebrew: מגדל אפק, lit. 'Tower of Aphek'; Ancient Greek: Αφεχού πύργος) stood at the same site as early as the second century BCE, and it was later destroyed by the Romans during the First Jewish–Roman War in 67 CE. In the Crusader period, a fort named Mirabel was built at the site. Muslim 13th-century sources mention it as Majdal Yaba. For a short time under Ottoman rule, its name was changed from Majdal Yaba to Majdal Sadiq and then back again.

Incorporated into Mandatory Palestine in 1922, Majdal Yaba was captured by Israeli forces during the 1948 Arab–Israeli war on July 12, 1948. The town was depopulated as a result of the military assault. The number of refugees from Majdal Yaba was estimated at 1,763. The Israeli locality of Rosh HaAyin was established on the village lands in 1950, followed by the kibbutz Givat HaShlosha in 1953.

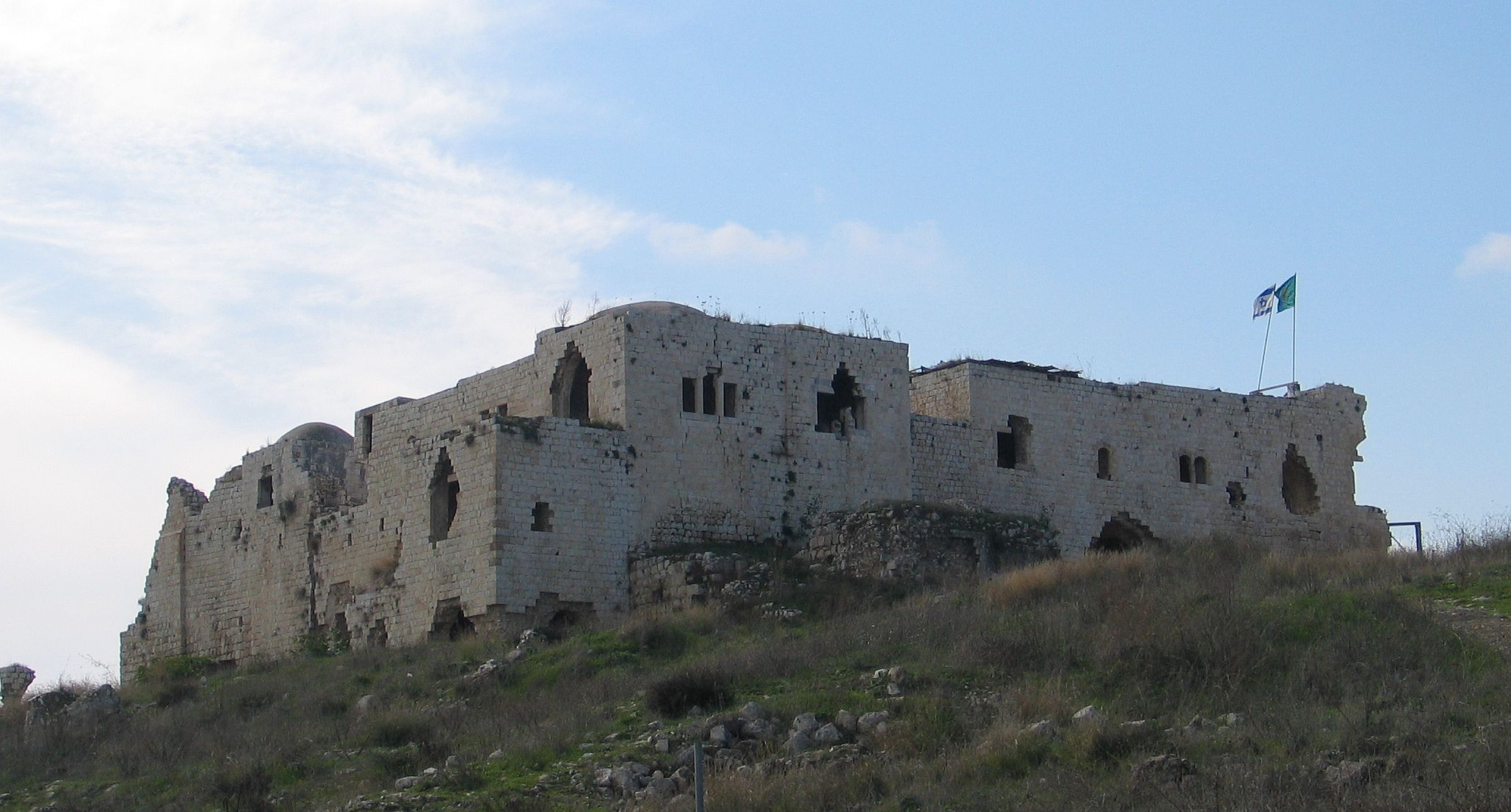
The fortress at the former site of Majdal Yaba, 2008

== History ==
=== Antiquity ===
As early as the second century BCE in the Hasmonean period a Judean settlement called Migdal Afek or Aphek (Hebrew: מגדל אפק) sat on the same hill of Mirabel and Majdal Yaba. According to Josephus, during the First Jewish–Roman War (66-70 CE), the Jews of Antipatris fled to Migdal Aphek on the approach of Cestius Gallius. The settlement was destroyed in the revolt and did not recover until the 2nd century CE, and in 363 an earthquake leveled the city.

=== Crusader/Ayyubid and Mamluk periods ===
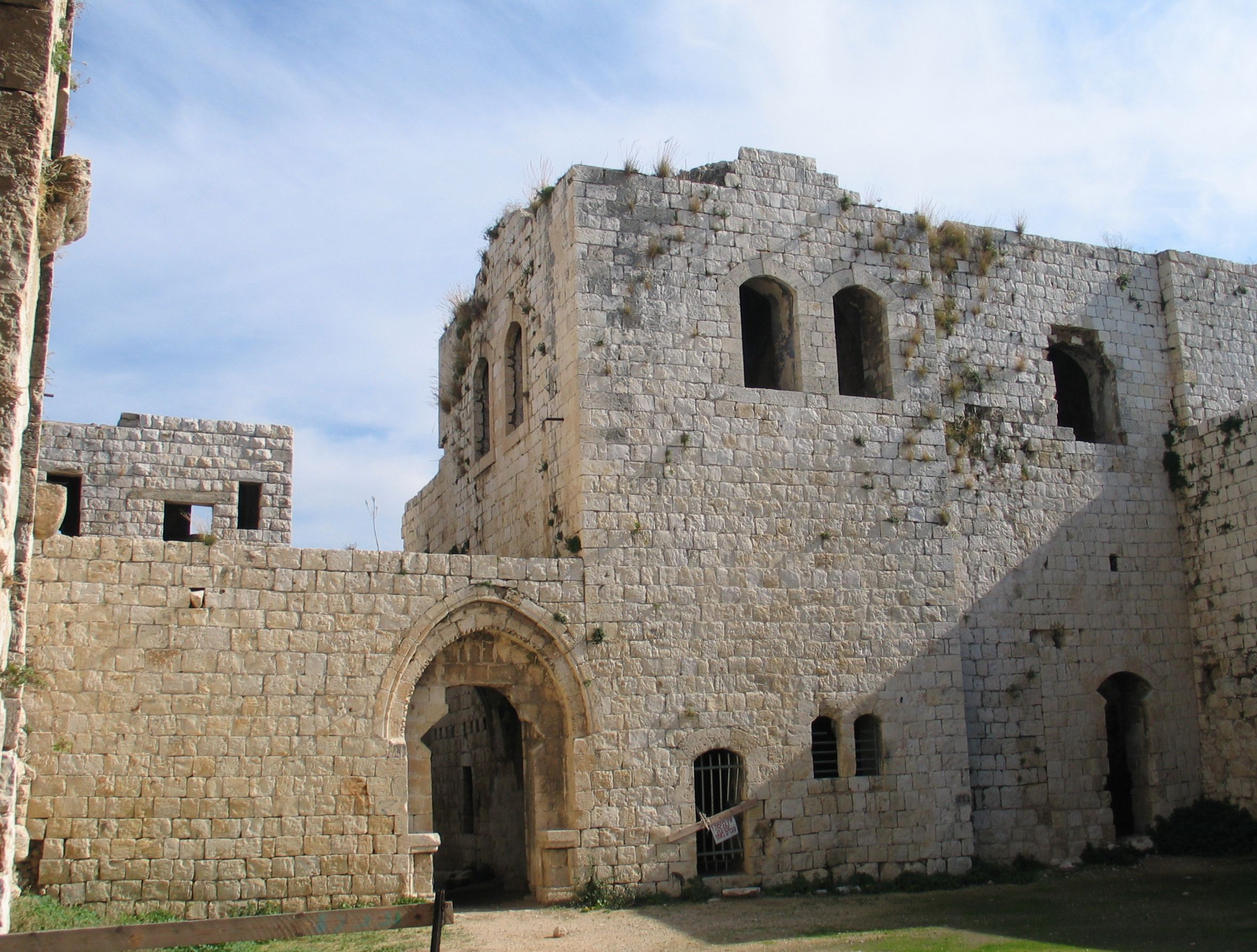
Ruins of the Mirabel fortress

The Crusaders conquered Palestine from the Fatimid Caliphate in 1099, and built a fortress on the former site of Migdal Afek and the future site of Majdal Yaba in 1152, naming it 'Mirabel'. The fort was held by Manasses of Hierges, but eventually fell to Baldwin of Ibelin, who ruled it as a lordship of the Kingdom of Jerusalem from 1162 to 1171. In 1166, lands belonging to the fortress and the harvest of its fields were given to the Church of St. John the Baptist in Nablus.

The Muslim diplomat Usama ibn Munqidh reported that the lord Hugh of Ibelin acted oppressively against the Muslims in the lordship; in 1156, he imposed heavy taxes on the Muslims, requiring them to pay four times as much as the local Christians. The inhabitants of eight villages, including the Ibn Qudamah family, left their homes in 1156 and migrated to Damascus, where they founded the Salihiyah suburb.

In 1177, the Muslim army under Saladin, sultan of the Egypt-based Ayyubid Sultanate, marched from south of Palestine northwards past Ascalon to Mirabel Castle, which was being used to defend the road between Jaffa and Jerusalem. In July 1187, Saladin's younger brother, al-Adil I, conquered Mirabel, but did not destroy the castle. According to E.G. Rey, there existed among the ruins 'the remains of a fine church of the 12th century', a claim repeated by T. A. Archer. Chronicler Baha ad-Din ibn Shaddad recorded that in 1191–92, Saladin used the castle as a base for carrying out raids against the Crusaders, although he camped outside of it. Saladin gave orders to dismantle the walls of Mirabel after his defeat at the battle of Arsuf. While under Ayyubid rule in 1226, the geographer Yaqut al-Hamawi mentions it as Majdal Yafa or 'Tower of Jaffa', probably due to its proximity to the town of Jaffa. He says it was a village with a "formidable fort".

June 1240 marked the arrival of the English crusade led by Richard of Cornwall, brother of the King Henry III of England and brother-in-law of Emperor Frederick II. Al-Salih Ayyub, the Ayyubid sultan of Egypt, offered Richard a new treaty to be complementary to the earlier one signed with Theobald IV, Count of Champagne. His offer this time included his readiness to recognize the legitimacy of the concessions made by his uncle and opponent al-Salih Ismail, the Ayyubid emir of Damascus, to the Crusaders, so that Jaffa and Ascalon, and all of Jerusalem, including Bethlehem and Majdal Yaba, in addition to Tiberias, Safed, Mount Tabor and the castles of Belvoir, were all included in the Kingdom of Jerusalem.

In 1266, after the fall of Jaffa to the Mamluks, Sultan Baybars sent chiefs from Deir Ghassaneh to protect Majdal Yaba's castle. In the late 13th century, the castle at Majdal Yafa was abandoned.

=== Ottoman period ===
Majdal Yaba had become repopulated when Palestine was incorporated into the Ottoman Empire in the early 16th century, and by the 1596 tax records, it was a small village in the nahiya ("subdistrict") of Jabal Qubal, part of Sanjak Nablus. The villagers paid a fixed tax rate of 33.3% on wheat, barley, beehives and goats; a total of 900 akçe. All of the revenue went to a waqf. The population consisted of 8 Muslim families, an estimated total population of 44. The castle in Majdal Yaba was rebuilt in the 18th and 19th centuries.

In the 18th and 19th centuries, Majdal Yaba formed the westernmost village of the highland region known as Jurat 'Amra or Bilad Jamma'īn. Situated between Deir Ghassaneh in the south and the present Route 5 in the north, and between Majdal Yaba in the west and Jamma'in, Marda and Kifl Haris in the east, this area served, according to historian Roy Marom, "as a buffer zone between the political-economic-social units of the Jerusalem and the Nablus regions. On the political level, it suffered from instability due to the migration of the Bedouin tribes and the constant competition among local clans for the right to collect taxes on behalf of the Ottoman authorities."

On 3 March 1799, General Kléber, commander-in-chief of the invading French forces, received the order to push detachments after having taken up position to the south of the Auja River, to watch enemy movements, and to prepare for the army to march to Acre. He instructed General Lannes), on 6 March, to undertake a reconnaissance in the mountains inhabited by the people of Jabal Nablus, who seemed to be hostile. Turks were firing from behind rocks and down precipices. The small column was obliged to retreat with heavy losses, with sixty French troops killed, more than double the number wounded, and Lannes's arm broken.

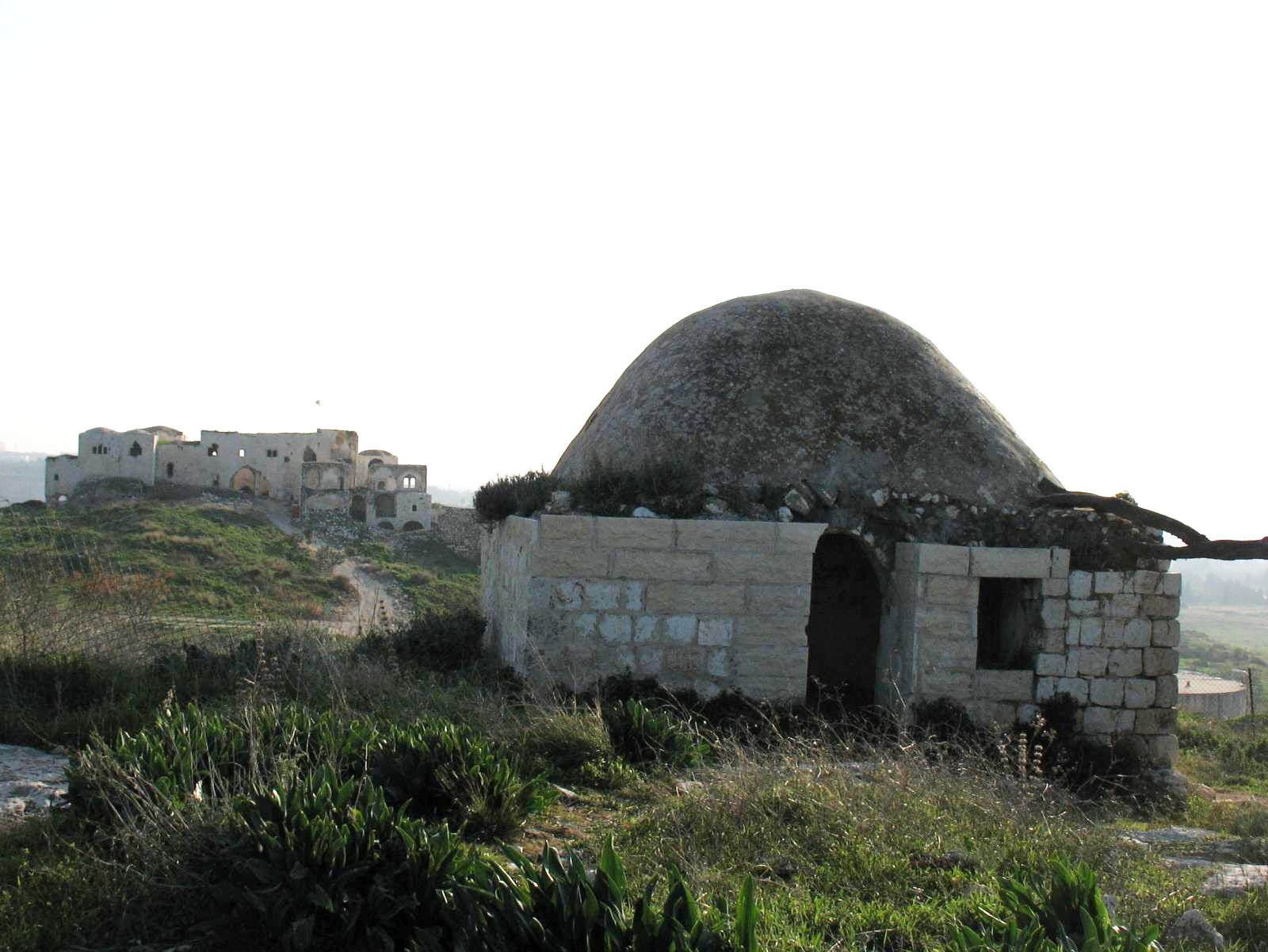
The Shrine (Maqam) of Burraz al-Din, 2007

In the 19th century, the village was named 'Majdal al-Sadiq' after Sheikh Muhammad al-Sadiq al-Jamma'ini, the chief of the village who hailed from the prominent Rayyan clan. The Rayyan were a branch of the Arab Bani Ghazi tribe that migrated to Palestine from Transjordan in the 17th century. According to Eli Smith, in 1843, the fortress (known as the "Rayyan Fortress") in the village was in ruins.

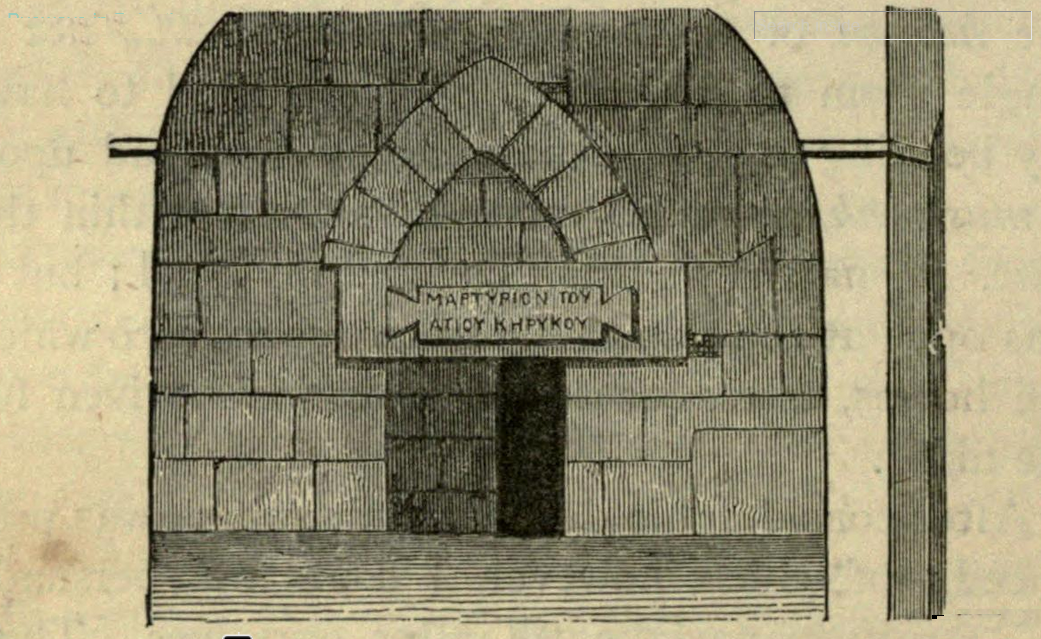
Finn's 1850 sketch of the door with the Greek inscription at the castle in Mejdal Yaba, which reads: ΜΑΡΤΥΡΙΟΝ ΤΟΥ ΑΓΙΟΥ ΚΗΡΥΚΟΥ, Martyr shrine (martyrion) of Saint Kyriko.

On 7 November 1850 James Finn, future British Consul to Jerusalem and Palestine, visited the village and found it and the castle in a very dilapidated condition. He met Sheikh al-Sadiq's family, and slept in the castle for a night, surveyed the remains of the church at the castle, and saw the Greek inscription upon the lintel, which he translated as meaning Martyr Memorial Church of the Holy Herald, but Clermont-Ganneau later translated as Martyr shrine (martyrion) of Saint Kyriko, relating Kyrikos/Cyricus, the child martyr of Tarsus. On leaving Majdal he descended to Ras al-Ain ("head of the springs") at half an hour's distance, a site which he believed to be identical with the ancient city of Antipatris.

When Edward Robinson visited in 1852, he reported that the fortress had been rebuilt and also served as a palace for the ruling sheikh. Sheikh al-Sadiq, however, had been banished by the Ottomans. In the 1850s, the Rayyan controlled 22–25 villages in the nahiye of Jamma'in West in Sanjak Nablus, with Majdal Yaba being their main village, where they maintained a fortress and manor. During this time, however, they were embroiled in war with their rival clan, the Qasim, who controlled the Jamma'in East area and also belonged to the Bani Ghazi tribe.

In 1859, Sulayman Rayyan was in control of Majdal Yaba, and by 1860 the Rayyan clan had lost all of their influence in the sanjak after being defeated by the Qasims. The Rayyan continued to live in and rule Majdal Yaba, but the village ceased to be a center of power. According to the PEF's Survey of Western Palestine (SWP), the Rayyan family were "ruined by the Turkish Government." Victor Guérin visited in 1870, and found it had 700 inhabitants.

In 1870/1871, an Ottoman census listed the village in the nahiya of Jamma'in al-Thani, subordinate to Nablus. Members of SWP who visited in 1873 reported a large building of "massive masonry", probably a former church, with a side door inscribed in Greek "Memorial of Saint Cerycus". In 1882, the village was described as "a large and important village, evidently an ancient site, having ancient tombs and remains of a church. It stands on high ground above the plain, and contains a house or palace of large size for the Sheikh; it was the seat of a famous family who ruled the neighbourhood. The water supply is from wells and cisterns. In 1888, a school was founded in Majdal Yaba.

Contemporaneous architectural remains at Majdal Yaba preserve impressions of ceramic bowls or plates set into square building stones above door lintels, paralleling a decorative practice documented at Yibna.

=== British Mandate ===
Majdal Yaba was captured by British troops on 9 November 1917. In the 1922 census of Palestine conducted by the British Mandate authorities, there were 726 inhabitants: 723 Muslims and 3 Jews, rising to 966, all Muslim, in a total of 227 houses in the 1931 census.

The layout of the village resembled a parallelogram and its houses were clustered together, separated by narrow alleys. They were built of mud and straw or stone and cement. Each neighborhood was inhabited by a single hamula ('clan') and contained a diwan for public meetings and receiving guests. The Rayyan family had still not recovered by the beginning of the Mandate Period; it was known to be impoverished, as was the Qasim family. "Dar az-zalimin kharab [the home of the oppressors is ruined]," said peasants when they passed by their kursis (seats of power). In 1935, a mosque was built in Majdal Yaba and the Ottoman-built school had reopened in 1920, enrolling 147 students in the mid-1940s. There was also a clinic in the village. Agriculture was the basis of the economy, with farmers planting wheat, corn, barley, vegetables, and sesame. They also tended fruit orchards, particularly citrus. Artesian wells irrigated the fields.

In the 1945 statistics Majdal Yaba had a population of 1,520 Muslims, with a total of 26,332 dunams of land. Of this, a total of 2,481 dunums of village land was used for citrus and bananas, 110 dunams were plantations or irrigable land, 13,906 dunums were used for cereals, while 59 dunams were classified as built-up urban areas.

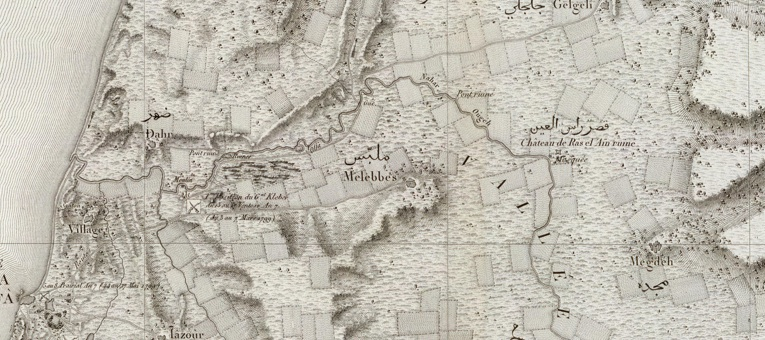
Majdal Yaba during French Invasion of 1799

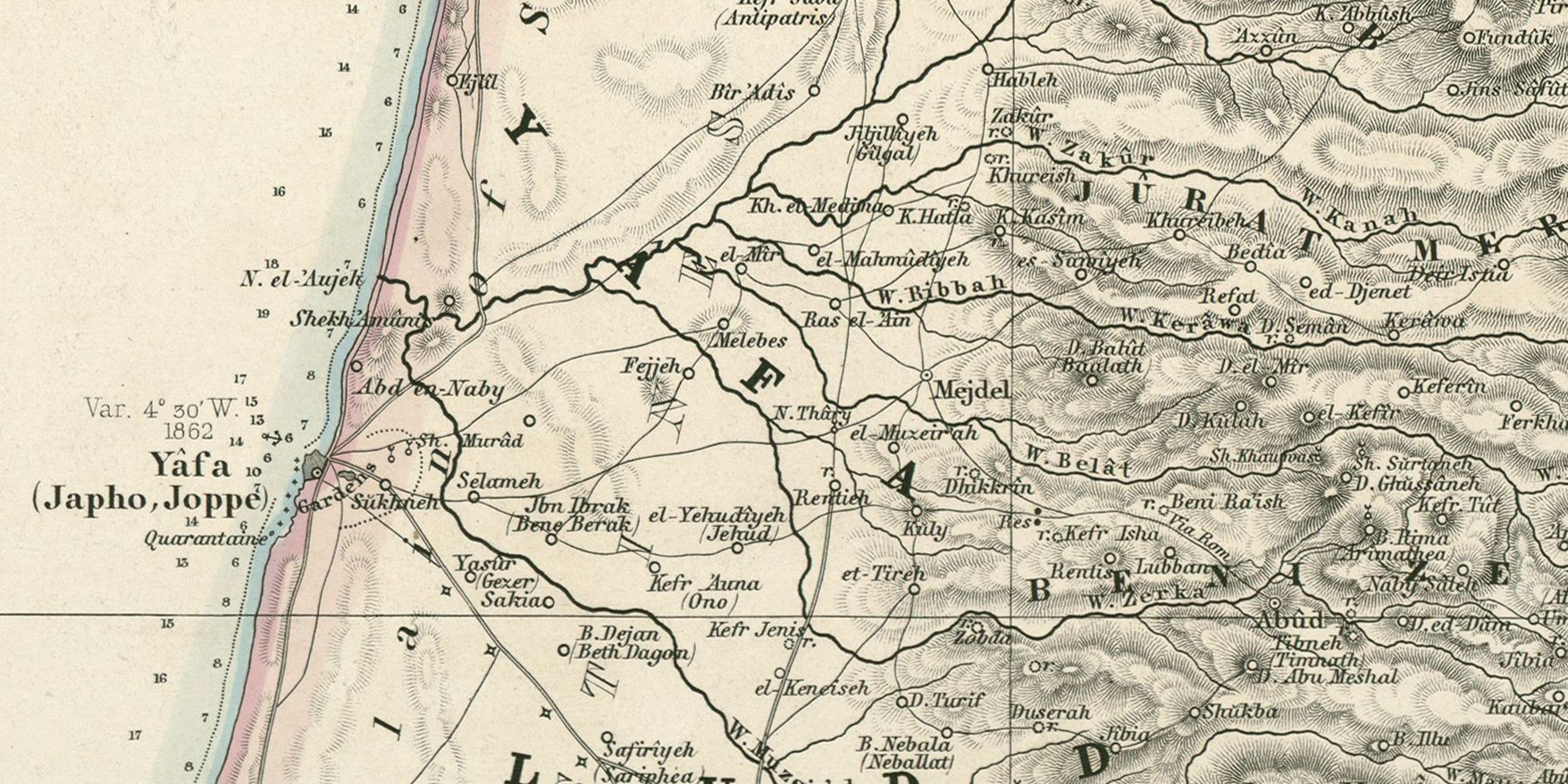
Megdel 1856

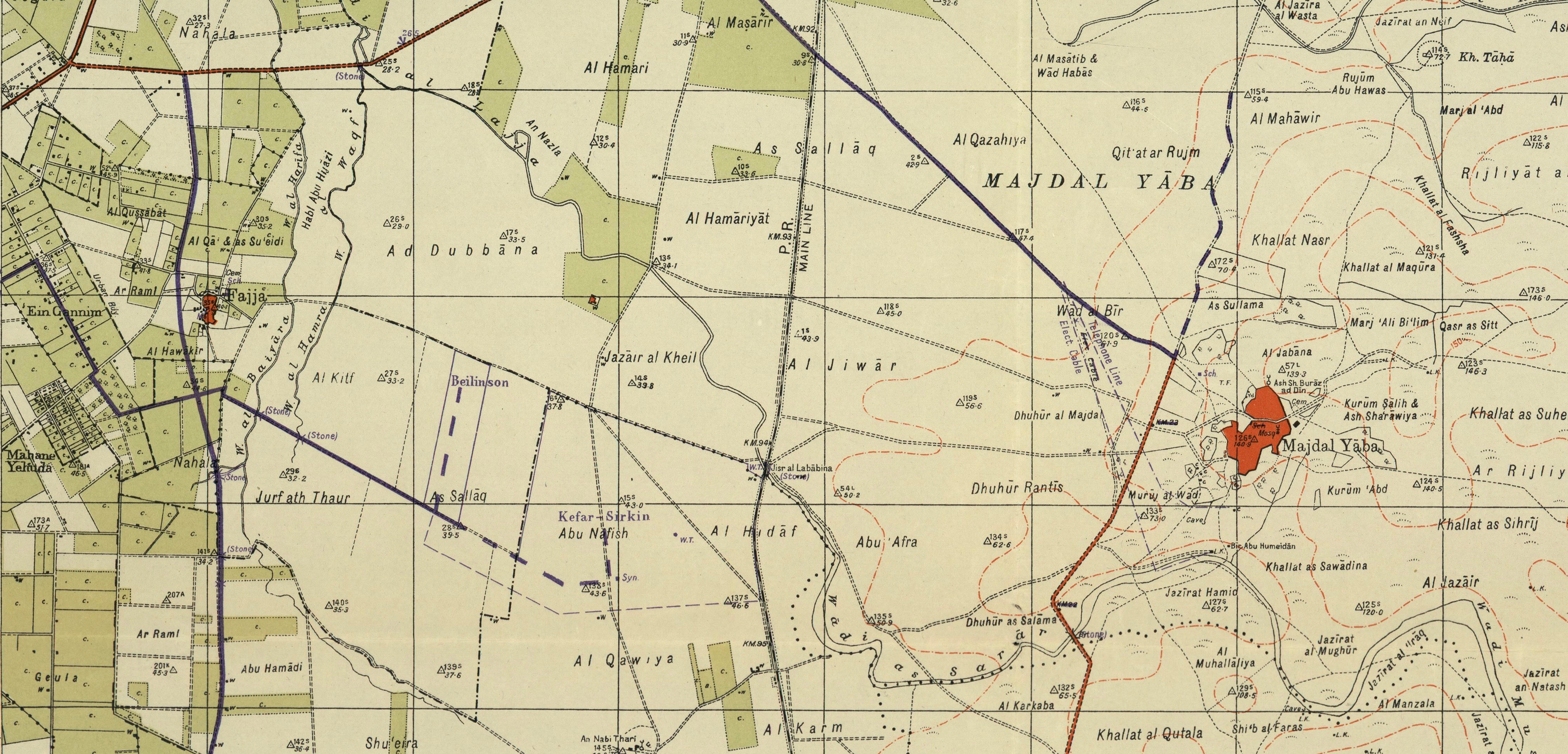
Majdal Yaba 1941 1:20,000

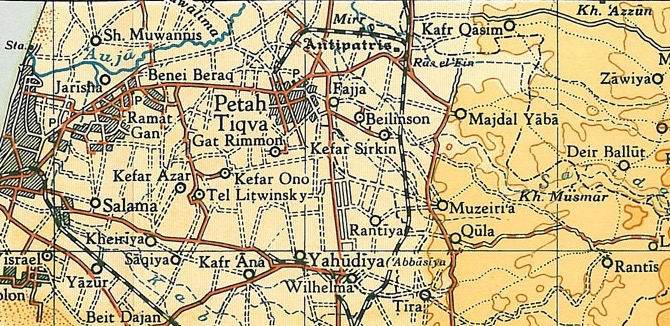
Majdal Yaba 1945 1:250,000

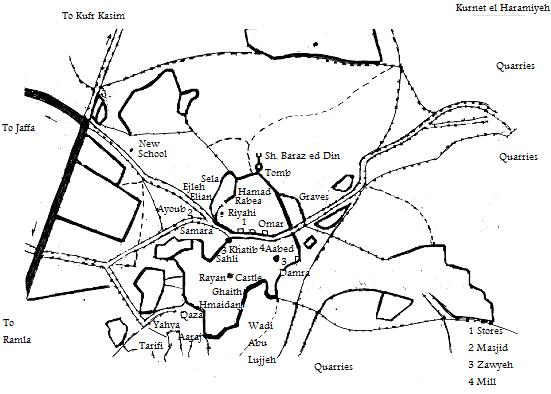
Families prior to 1948

=== 1948 war and aftermath ===
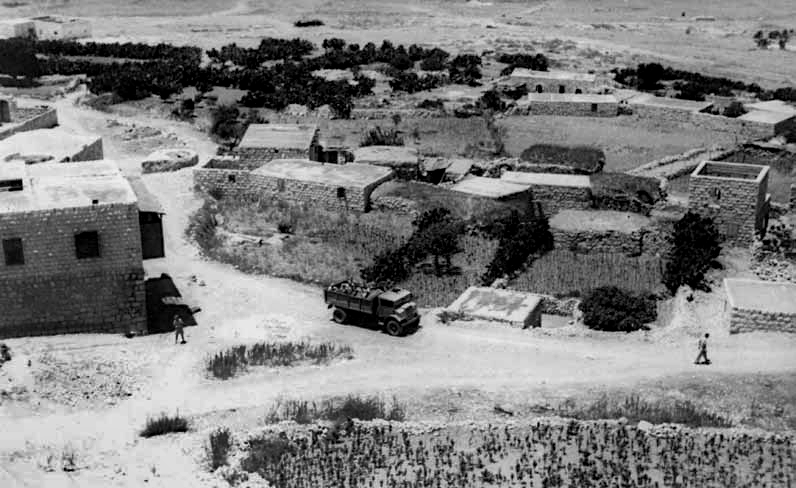
Majdal Yaba, July 1948

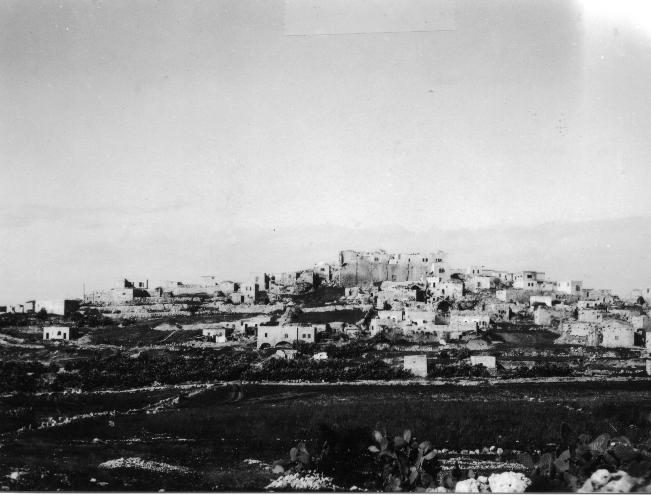
Majdal Yaba, February 1949

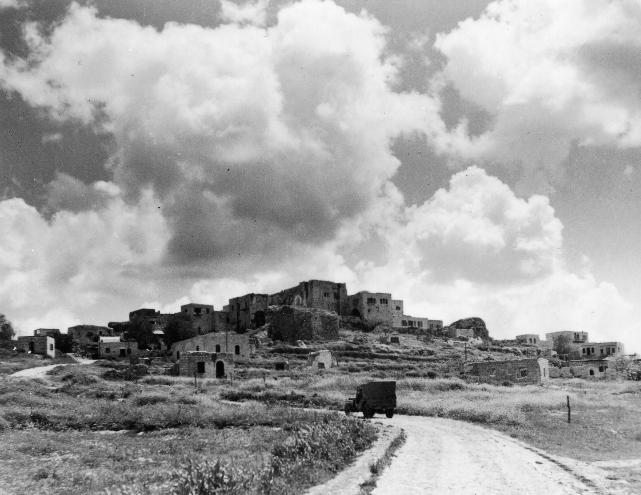
Majdal Yada, March 1949

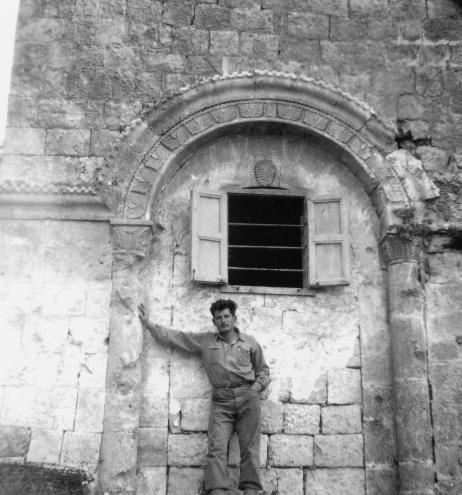
Member of Harel Brigade at Majdal Yaba, 1949

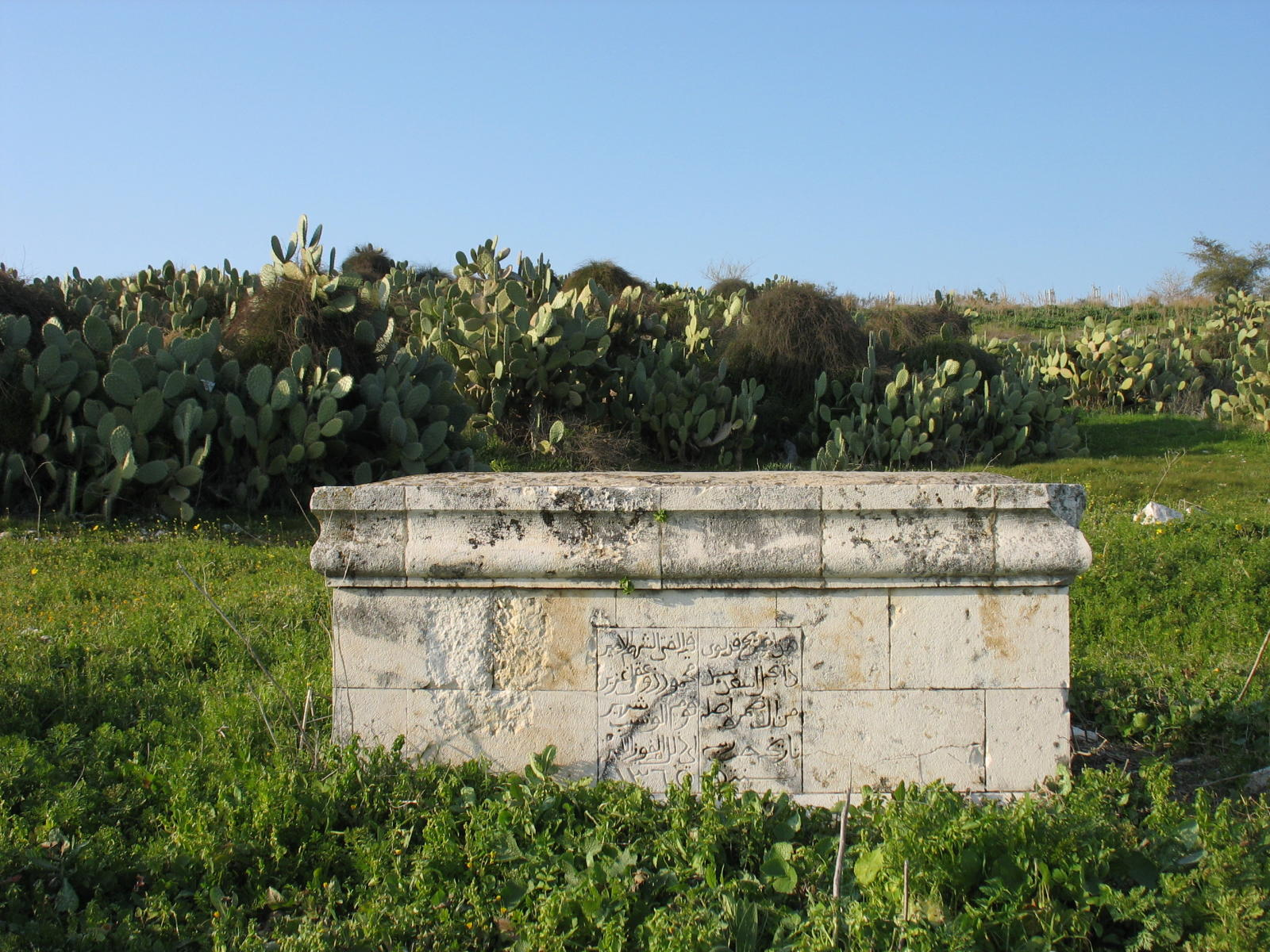
Damra family tomb in Majdal Yaba's Eastern Cemetery

Majdal Yaba was in the territory allotted to the Arab state under the 1947 UN Partition Plan. During the war, it was occupied by the Second Battalion of the Alexandroni Brigade on July 12, 1948, in Operation Danny, after wresting it from the Iraqi Army who were defending the village during the 1948 Arab-Israeli War. The nearby village of Ras al-Ein, deserted in the 1920s, was also captured. The New York Times reported that the situation of the surrounded Iraqi troops was "hopeless". The capture of Majdal Yaba also led to the control of the hills lying to the north of the operation zone and the springs of the al-Auja river (Arabic: نهر العوجا). On August 28, 1948, The Iraqi forces attempted to recapture the village, but were asked to abandon the operation

The Israeli town of Rosh HaAyin — which today is a city – was built on village lands in 1950, and in 1953, the Jewish kibbutz of Givat HaShlosha was established on village lands. According to Palestinian historian Walid Khalidi, the Rayyan Fortress still "crowns the site" in addition to the tomb of Sheikh Muhammad Al-Sadiq, and a part of the village cemetery still remains. In 1992 the fortress was "slowly crumbling" and the dome of the tomb was severely cracked. The ruins of Mirabel Castle have been recently restored and made accessible as part of the Israeli national park of Migdal Afek.

== See also ==
- Depopulated Palestinian locations in Israel
- Migdal Afek, Israeli national park centered around the ruins of Mirabel Castle
- Vassals of the Kingdom of Jerusalem of the Crusader period

== Bibliography ==
- Barron, J.B., ed. (1923). Palestine: Report and General Abstracts of the Census of 1922. Government of Palestine.
- Bourrienne, L.A.F. de (1891). Memoirs of Napoleon Bonaparte. Vol. 1. Charles Scribner's Sons. ISBN 978-1-4446-7930-4.
- Clermont-Ganneau, C.S. (1896). [ARP] Archaeological Researches in Palestine 1873-1874, translated from the French by J. McFarlane. Vol. 2. London: Palestine Exploration Fund. (pp. 340-341)
- Conder, C.R.; Kitchener, H.H. (1882). The Survey of Western Palestine: Memoirs of the Topography, Orography, Hydrography, and Archaeology. Vol. 2. London: Committee of the Palestine Exploration Fund.
- Conder, C.R. (1897). The Latin Kingdom of Jerusalem, 1099 to 1291 AD. London: Committee of the Palestine Exploration Fund.
- Doguereau, J.-P. [in French] (2002). Guns in the Desert. Praeger. ISBN 0-313-32512-X.
- Doumani, B. (1995). Rediscovering Palestine: Merchants and Peasants in Jabal Nablus, 1700-1900. University of California Press. ISBN 0-520-20370-4.
- Finn, J. (1877). Byeways in Palestine. London: James Nisbet.
- Government of Palestine, Department of Statistics (1945). Village Statistics, April, 1945. Archived from the original on 2019-04-02.
- Guérin, V. (1875). Description Géographique Historique et Archéologique de la Palestine (in French). Vol. 2: Samarie, pt. 2. Paris: L'Imprimerie Nationale.
- Hadawi, S. (1970). Village Statistics of 1945: A Classification of Land and Area ownership in Palestine. Palestine Liberation Organization Research Center. Archived from the original on 2018-12-08.
- Hütteroth, W.-D.; Abdulfattah, K. (1977). Historical Geography of Palestine, Transjordan and Southern Syria in the Late 16th Century. Erlanger Geographische Arbeiten, Sonderband 5. Erlangen, Germany: Vorstand der Fränkischen Geographischen Gesellschaft. ISBN 3-920405-41-2. Archived from the original on 2024-09-28.
- Khalidi, W. (1992). All That Remains: The Palestinian Villages Occupied and Depopulated by Israel in 1948. Washington D.C.: Institute for Palestine Studies. ISBN 0-88728-224-5.
- Khamisy, Rabei G.; Pringle, Denys (2019). "Richard of Cornwall's Treaty with Egypt, 1241". In Menache, Sophia; Kedar, Benjamin Z.; Balard, Michel (eds.). Crusading and Trading between West and East: Studies in Honour of David Jacoby. Abingdon and New York: Routledge. ISBN 978-1-315-14275-3.
- Laughlin, John Charles Hugh (2006). Fifty Major Cities of the Bible: From Dan to Beersheba. Taylor & Francis. ISBN 978-0-415-22315-7.
- Le Strange, G. (1890). Palestine Under the Moslems: A Description of Syria and the Holy Land from A.D. 650 to 1500. London: Committee of the Palestine Exploration Fund.
- Mills, E., ed. (1932). Census of Palestine 1931. Population of Villages, Towns and Administrative Areas. Jerusalem: Government of Palestine.
- Morris, B. (2004). The Birth of the Palestinian Refugee Problem Revisited. Cambridge University Press. ISBN 0-521-00967-7.
- Murphy-O'Connor, J. (2008). The Holy Land: An Oxford Archaeological Guide from Earliest Times to 1700. Oxford University Press US. ISBN 978-0-19-923666-4.
- Palmer, E.H. (1881). The Survey of Western Palestine: Arabic and English Name Lists Collected During the Survey by Lieutenants Conder and Kitchener, R. E. Transliterated and Explained by E.H. Palmer. Committee of the Palestine Exploration Fund.
- Petersen, Andrew (2001). A Gazetteer of Buildings in Muslim Palestine (British Academy Monographs in Archaeology). Vol. 1. Oxford University Press. ISBN 978-0-19-727011-0. Archived from the original on 2021-05-28. (pp. 213 Archived 2016-10-10 at the Wayback Machine–215.)
- Pringle, D. (1997). Secular buildings in the Crusader Kingdom of Jerusalem: an archaeological Gazetter. Cambridge University Press. ISBN 0521-46010-7.
- Pringle, D. (1998). The Churches of the Crusader Kingdom of Jerusalem: L-Z (excluding Tyre). Vol. II. Cambridge University Press. ISBN 0-521-39037-0.
- Rey, E.G. (1883). Les colonies franques de Syrie aux XIIme et XIIIme siècles (in French). Paris: A. Picard. (pp. 412-413)
- Robinson, E.; Smith, E. (1856). Later Biblical Researches in Palestine and adjacent regions: A Journal of Travels in the year 1852. London: John Murray.
- Röhricht, R. (1893). (RRH) Regesta regni Hierosolymitani (MXCVII-MCCXCI) (in Latin). Berlin: Libraria Academica Wageriana.
- Schölch, A. (1986): Palästina im Umbruch 1856–1882. Wiesbaden and Stuttgart: Franz Steiner Verlag.
- Schölch, A. (1993). Palestine in Transformation, 1856–1882: Studies in Social, Economic, and Political Development (PDF). Institute for Palestine Studies. ISBN 0-88728-234-2.
- van de Velde, C.W.M. (1858). Memoir to Accompany the Map of the Holy Land. Gotha: Justus Perthes.
