= Ibelin (castle) =

Ruined crusader castle in Israel

Ibelin was a crusader castle in the Latin Kingdom of Jerusalem at the town of Ibelin, later known as Yibna, and today southeast of the modern Israeli city of Yavne. Very little remains of the castle, but its ruins have been located in the center of Yibna, today known as "Tel Yavne".

It was the fief of the noble house of Ibelin, which later achieved great prominence in the kingdom. Ibelin was built in 1141 by King Fulk of Jerusalem to guard the kingdom's southern border, though its importance declined as the border moved south. It remained the centre of the Lordship of Ibelin, until the collapse of the Kingdom of Jerusalem in 1187. The castle was captured by Saladin in 1187 after the crusader defeat at Hattin, and was destroyed.

== History ==
Ibelin was built in 1141, one of four castles on the southern border of the kingdom, between the crusader city of Jaffa and the Fatimid city of Ascalon. Ibelin, and the other castles, were built to guard against attacks from Ascalon, to provide shelter for the people when attacked, and to serve as a base for crusader attacks on Fatimids.

Ascalon was a threat to the kingdom during the first half of the 12th century; the Fatimids staged raids from the city in most years aimed at Jaffa and the surrounding country, while its strong defences and harbour made it impervious to crusader attack. The city could be resupplied by sea in the event of a siege, and the garrison was relieved regularly. The construction of Ibelin and the other castles went some way to alleviate this situation, leading to a successful campaign in 1153 which saw the fall of Ascalon to the crusaders.

The construction of Ibelin and the other castles had a number of benefits; William of Tyre wrote that 'the people began to place reliance on the castles and suburban places grew up around them; the whole district became safer because it was inhabited, and a more plentiful supply of food for the surrounding area became possible'.

The importance of Ibelin and the other forts declined in 1153 with the fall of Ascalon to a siege and assault by King Fulk and the crusader army, and by the building of fortifications further south at Gaza and at Darum. However, in 1187 Ibelin fell to Saladin's army when he conquered the kingdom after the battle of Hattin, and the Ibelin family fell back to their other holdings in Cyprus and at Beirut. Ibelin was left in ruins, and was not rebuilt.

== Construction ==
Little is known of Ibelin's layout, as it has not survived. However, Ibelin and the other castles around Ascalon were built as a group, and so bear similarities. Ibelin is reported to have been a square enclosure, with four towers, which is comparable to Castel Arnaldi, Beth Gibelin, and Blanchegarde, of which some ruins survive.

The castles were built on the initiative of the then king, Fulk I, but with wide community co-operation. Castrum Arnaldi was built in 1132 by the patriarch and citizens of Jerusalem at a notorious ambush spot on the Jerusalem road. This was followed in 1136 by the castle at Beth Gibelin, to the east of Ascalon, "by the patriarch William, the magnates", and "the people of the whole kingdom". In 1141 king Fulk, the leading barons, the patriarch and the bishops, made a joint decision to build a castle north of Ascalon at Ibelin, their name for the town of Yibna. The site was a tell to the east of the town, an artificial mound marking an ancient ruins of previous settlements stretching back to biblical times. The castle itself took the form of a square enclosure with four towers, and was entrusted to Barisan, who took his name from the castle and whose family became one of the most influential in the kingdom. The following year the king and the people of the kingdom built Blanchegarde, to the east of Ibelin.

In 2005, the gate room of the castle was unearthed during archaeologic works.

== The castle site ==
Ibelin was built at the top of the mound of Yibna, itself marking the ruins of ancient Jamnia. When it was itself ruined it became part of the mound, now known as Tel Yavne. Some unpublished archeological work has been done in 2005 at the Crusader-period part of the tell, headed by Dan Bahat.
