= Manasses of Hierges =

Crusader and constable (c. 1110–1177)

Manasses of Hierges (c. 1110–1177) was a minor lord from the southern Low Countries who is best known for his ten-year career (1142–1152) in the Kingdom of Jerusalem, where he became constable and lord of Ramla. In 1152, following a civil war in the kingdom, he returned home with a major relic of the True Cross. Upon his death in 1177, the cross relic became the subject of a dispute between his heirs and the Benedictine abbey of Brogne.

== Family and crusading career ==
Manasses was the son of Hodierna of Rethel and a man named Héribrand, a castle functionary at Bouillon. His maternal grandfather was Hugh I of Rethel and maternal uncle was King Baldwin II of Jerusalem. His father's own holdings appear to have been very modest, with Hierges only coming to constitute a lordship in about 1112. Manasses can be observed witnessing charters in 1127 and 1131, when he was still quite young.

In 1140, Manasses made gifts to the abbey of Brogne in the presence of the bishop of Liège, indicating that he was preparing to journey to Jerusalem. By 1142, Manasses had reached the Holy Land and entered the service of his cousin, Queen Melisende of Jerusalem. In 1143, after the death of her husband King Fulk, Melisende appointed Manasses constable of the kingdom, commander of the army and the highest office of the kingdom. He was holding this important military position when the atabeg of Mosul, Imad al-Din Zengi, launched his attack on the county of Edessa. Manasses attempted to lead a relief army to save the county but was too late. When the armies of the Second Crusade subsequently arrived in the kingdom, Manasses was present at the Council of Acre that year when they decided to attack Damascus, but the siege of Damascus was a failure and the crusade dispersed.

== Exile and return to Hierges ==
Manasses continued to be a favorite of Queen Melisende, and in 1150 was rewarded with marriage to Helvisa, heiress of the lordship of Ramla. Together, Manasses and Helvisa had two daughters, Isabel and Helvisa. A late source, the Lignages d'Outremer, claims that this was Manasses' second marriage in the kingdom of Jerusalem, but no contemporary sources are available which confirm the earlier union. According to William of Tyre, Manasses "is said to have conducted himself very haughtily. He assumed an insolent attitude of superiority towards the elders of the realm and refused to show them proper respect." With his newfound power, he made many enemies among the more established older nobles, and Melisende's son King Baldwin III especially hated him for keeping him out of government and alienating him from his mother. Manasses supported Melisende against Baldwin III when Baldwin attempted to claim full power in 1152. Baldwin had himself crowned separately and the kingdom was divided between him and Melisende, with Melisende keeping Jerusalem and Nablus in the south and Baldwin ruling from Acre and Tyre in the north. Baldwin appointed a constable of his own, Humphrey II of Toron, and soon invaded the south. He forced Manasses to surrender his castle of Mirabel, and captured Jerusalem from Melisende.

In 1152, Manasses was exiled and permanently replaced as constable by Humphrey. He returned to his lands at Hierges. In 1158 and 1170 he once again appears as witnesses in charters issued by Count Henry the Blind of Namur and the bishop of Liège, Rudolf of Zähringen, respectively. At some point, presumably later in the 1150s, Manasses married Alice, daughter of Count Albert of Chiny and Agnes, daughter of Count Reginald I of Bar. Manasses and Alice had at least three children, Heribrand, Henry, and Melisende.

== Death and The Holy Cross of Brogne ==
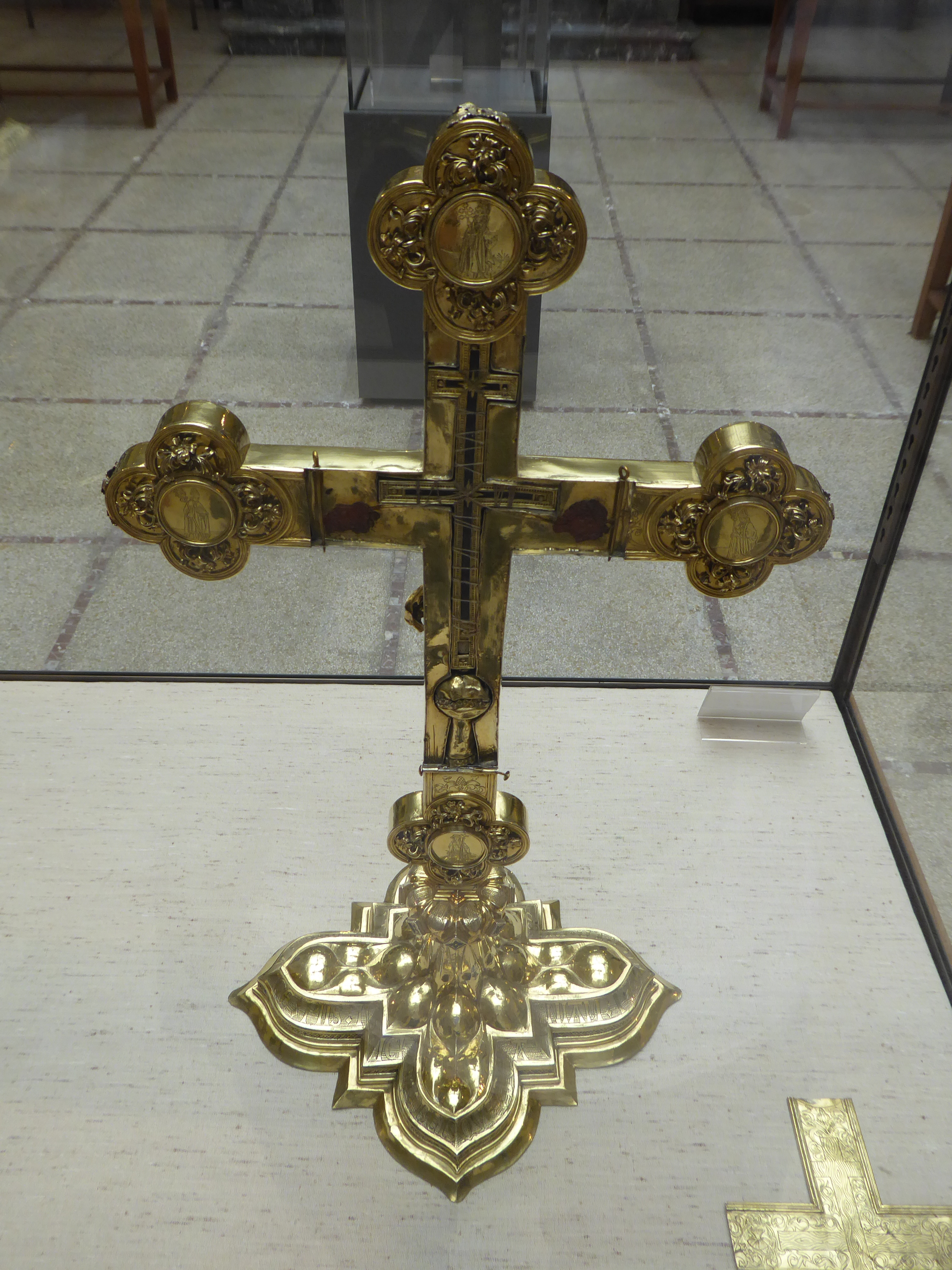
Reverse of the Cross of Brogne, showing the embedded twelfth century reliquary. Namur, Musée diocesain et Trésor de la Cathédrale

Monks at the abbey of Brogne wrote two accounts of how Manasses, during his time on crusade, had acquired a major relic of the True Cross, which he brought back with him after his exile in 1152. The relic was said to have belonged to the prince of Antioch, Raymond of Poitiers (r. 1126–1149), who had carried it before him in battle. The longer work they wrote, How the Holy Cross Came from Antioch to the Monastery of Brogne, composed in 1211, includes a biography of Manasses and an account of his crusading career that contradicts the claims of William of Tyre, probably based on Manasses own testimony. It also includes a lengthy account of a dispute that broke out after Manasses' death between his heirs, Heribrand and Henry, and the monastery of Brogne over control of the relic. The monks were eventually successful in acquiring the relic, and established a liturgy for its arrival. The new cult attracted gifts and resulted in miracle stories.

In 1505 Guillaume de Beez, abbot of Brogne commissioned a new silver orfévrerie reliquary to house the relic originally acquired by Manasses. That reliquary is now kept at the Diocesan Museum and Treasury of the cathedral of Namur. The original reliquary can still be seen by removing the rear panels of the larger 1505 reliquary.
