= Fürstenberg =

Fürstenberg (also Fuerstenberg and Furstenberg) may refer to:

== Historical states ==
- Fürstenberg-Baar, county (1441–1559)
- Fürstenberg-Blumberg, county (1559–1614)
- Fürstenberg-Donaueschingen, county (1617–1698)
- Fürstenberg-Fürstenberg, county (1408–1441, 1704–1716) and principality (1716–1804)
- Fürstenberg-Geisingen, county (1441–1483)
- Fürstenberg-Heiligenberg, county (1559–1664) and principality (1664–1716)
- Fürstenberg-Messkirch, county (1614–1716) and principality (1716–1744)
- Fürstenberg-Möhringen, county (1599–1641)
- Fürstenberg-Pürglitz, principality (1762–1806)
- Fürstenberg-Stühlingen, county (1614–1704)
- Fürstenberg-Taikowitz, county (1759–1806)
- Fürstenberg-Weitra, county (1705–1806)
- Fürstenberg-Wolfach, county (1408–1490)
- Principality of Fürstenberg, county (1250–1408) and principality

== Cities and municipalities ==
- Fürstenberg/Havel, a city in the district of Oberhavel, Brandenburg, Germany
- Fürstenberg, Lower Saxony, a municipality in the district Holzminden, Lower Saxony, Germany
- Fürstenberg, part of Eisenhüttenstadt, Brandenburg, Germany
- A quarter of Xanten in the district of Wesel (North Rhine-Westphalia), Germany
- A part of Lichtenfels, Hesse, Germany
- A quarter of Bad Wünnenberg, Paderborn, North Rhine-Westphalia, Germany

== Castles ==
- Fürstenberg Castle (Rheindiebach), castle ruin near Oberdiebach-Rheindiebach in Landkreis Mainz-Bingen in Rheinland-Pfalz
- Fürstenberg Castle (Hüfingen), Hüfingen-Fürstenberg, Baden-Württemberg
- Fürstenberg Castle (Höingen), Ense, North Rhine-Westphalia

== Noble families ==
- House of Fürstenberg (Swabia), from Swabia (now southern Baden-Württemberg), Germany
- House of Fürstenberg (Westphalia), from Westphalia, Germany

== Family name ==
- Clara Agnelli, the former Princess Clara von Fürstenberg (1920–2016), Italian socialite
- Prince Alexander von Fürstenberg (born 1970), son of Diane von Fürstenberg, fashion designer
- Alexandra von Fürstenberg (born 1972), American image director for DvF
- Virginia von Fürstenberg (1974–2023), Italian fashion designer and artist
- Betsy von Furstenberg (1931–2015), German-American actress and writer
- Carl Fürstenberg (1850–1933), German prominent banker
- Diane von Fürstenberg (born 1946), Belgian-American fashion designer
- Eleonore of Fürstenberg (1523–1544), daughter of Count Frederick III of Fürstenberg
- Elimar Freiherr von Fürstenberg (1910–1981), German politician
- Elisabeth zu Fürstenberg (1767–1822), Princess consort of Fürstenberg
- Prince Egon von Fürstenberg (1946–2004), fashion designer
- Franz Egon von Fürstenberg-Heiligenberg (1625–1682), bishop of Strassburg
- Franz Egon von Fürstenberg-Stammheim (1797–1859), German landowner and politician
- Franz Friedrich Wilhelm von Fürstenberg (1729–1810), German statesman
- Hani Furstenberg, Israeli-American actress and singer
- Hillel Furstenberg (born 1935), Israeli mathematician
- Ira von Fürstenberg (1940–2024), European socialite and actress
- Jeannette zu Fürstenberg (born 1982), German businesswoman
- Joachim of Fürstenberg (1538–1598), Count of Fürstenberg
- Karl Aloys zu Fürstenberg (1760–1799), soldier in the Austrian service
- Matilde Borromeo, the Princess Matilde zu Fürstenberg (born 1983), Italian equestrian
- Maximilian von Fürstenberg (1904–1988), cardinal of the Roman Catholic Church
- Pontus Fürstenberg (1827–1902), Swedish art collector and merchant from a Jewish family
- Talita von Fürstenberg (born 1999), granddaughter of Diane von Fürstenberg, model and socialite
- Tatiana von Fürstenberg (born 1971), American rock singer and filmmaker
- Wilhelm Egon von Fürstenberg (1629–1704), German clergyman and bishop of Strasbourg
- Yakov Ganetsky/Hanecki, real name Jakub Fürstenberg, Bolshevik revolutionary

== Other ==
- Fürstenberg (Baar), a mountain of Baden-Württemberg, Germany
- Fürstenberg Brewery (Fürstlich Fürstenbergische Brauerei), a brewery
- Fürstenberg China (Porzellanmanufaktur Fürstenberg), a porcelain factory
- Furstenberg's rosette, an anatomical structure located in the internal streak canal of the teat

== See also ==
- Fürstenberg Castle (disambiguation)
- Ferdinand of Fürstenberg (disambiguation)
- Fürstenfeld
- Fürst (surname)
