= House of Fürstenberg (Westphalia) =

Noble family in Westphalia

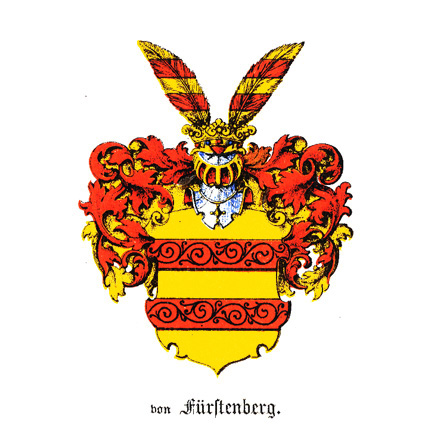
Original coat of arms of the family

The House of Fürstenberg (German pronunciation: [ˈfʏʁstn̩ˌbɛʁk]) is the name of a German noble family of Westphalia, which descended from Hermannus de Vorstenberg. He was a liegeman of the Archbishop of Cologne, who was among the prince electors of the Holy Roman Empire. Hermannus held a castle for his lord called Fürstenberg ("Prince's Hill") at Ense-Höingen in Soest; this castle would give the family its name. His son was Wilhelm von Vorstenberg, the Justiciar and Castellan of Werl.

== History ==
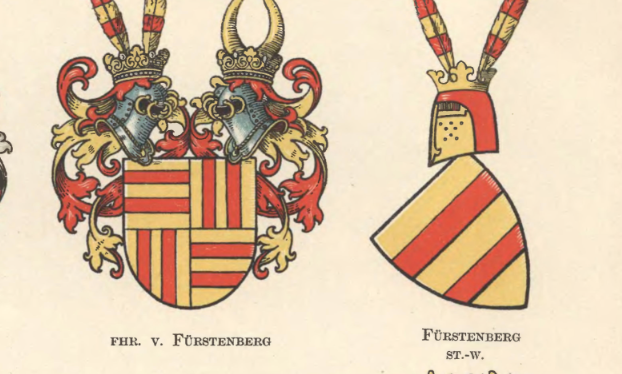
The original coat of arms at right, with the 1660 baronial arms at left

Already Imperial Knights, the family members were created Imperial Barons (Reichsfreiherren) on 26 April 1660. Matriculation to the baronial class in the Kingdom of Bavaria occurred on 22 August 1891 for Friedrich Freiherr von Fürstenberg, Rittmeister à la suite in the Landgraviate of Hesse-Darmstadt and Freeholder of Egenburg by Würzburg. The baronial Fürstenberg family of Westphalia should not be confused with the princely family of Fürstenberg from Swabia.

Some members of the family were elevated to comital dignities during German Mediatization for their services to the Kingdom of Prussia, or given honorific titles for their twentieth-century achievements:

- Herdringen Line: a Prussian graviate; the title was Graf von Fürstenberg-Herdringen, and an estate in tail, Besitz Herdringen, was given on 16 January 1843 to Franz Egon Freiherr von Fürstenberg of Herdringen (1818–1902), a member of the Prussian House of Lords and Seneschal in the Duchy of Westphalia.
- Stammheim Line: a Prussian graviate; the title of Graf von Fürstenberg-Stammheim, in the Demesne of Stammheim, was given on 15 October 1840 to the Royal Prussian Chamberlain, Franz Egon Freiherr von Fürstenberg of Stammheim, and the heirs of his body. This line died out in 1925.
- Belgian naturalisation as Baron de Furstenberg was granted on 18 April 1887 to Clemens Freiherr von Fürstenberg. A Belgian comté was created with the title of Comte de Furstenberg on 3 January 1964 for Wenemar Freiherr von Furstenberg, an agricultural scientist.

== Former holdings ==
The family's ancestral seat is Schloss Herdringen near Arnsberg. In the nineteenth century, the family also owned the following castles:

- Eggeringhausen
- Gimborn
- Hugenpoet-Borbeck
- Körtlinghausen
- Köln-Stammheim

== Notable members ==
- Kaspar of Fürstenberg, Drost of Westphalia (1545–1618)
- Dietrich of Fürstenberg, prince bishop of Paderborn (1546–1618)
- Ferdinand Freiherr von Fürstenberg, prince bishop of Paderborn, prince bishop of Münster (1626–1683)
- Franz Friedrich Wilhelm von Fürstenberg, statesman and educator (1729–1810)
- Franz Egon Freiherr von Fürstenberg, prince bishop of Paderborn, prince bishop of Hildesheim (1737–1825)
- Franz Egon Graf von Fürstenberg-Stammheim (1797–1859)
- Maximilien de Furstenberg-Stammheim (1904–1988), a cardinal of the Catholic Church and prefect of the Congregation for the Oriental Churches
- Elimar Freiherr von Fürstenberg (1910–1981)

=== Fürstenberg-Herdringen ===
- Franz Egon Freiherr von Fürstenberg-Herdringen (1818–1902)
- Engelbert Egon Graf von Fürstenberg-Herdringen (1850–1918)
- Franz-Egon Graf von Fürstenberg-Herdringen (1896–1975), married to Gloria Guinness (1912–1980)
- Wenemar von Fürstenberg-Herdringen (1897–1972)
- Betsy von Furstenberg-Herdringen (1931–2015), a German-born American radio, television, film, and Broadway actress
- Dolores Guinness née von Fürstenberg-Herdringen (1936–2012)
- Franz-Egon von Fürstenberg-Herdringen (born 1939)
- Adelina von Fürstenberg, married to Franz-Egon von Fürstenberg-Herdringen

== Bibliography ==
- Andernach, Norbert/Keinemann, Friedrich et al. (rev.): Fürstenbergsche Geschichte, 4th vol., Die Geschichte des Geschlechtes von Fürstenberg im 18. Jahrhundert, Münster, 1979.
- Chisholm, Hugh, ed. (1911). "Fürstenberg" . Encyclopædia Britannica. Vol. 11 (11th ed.). Cambridge University Press. pp. 365–367.
- Gosmann, Michael (ed.): Fürstenberger Skizzen. Streifzug durch 700 Jahre westfälische Familien- und Landesgeschichte, Arnsberg, 1995.
- v. Klocke, Friedrich (rev.): Fürstenbergsche Geschichte, 1st vol., Die Geschichte des Geschlechtes von Fürstenberg bis um 1400, 2nd edn., Münster, 1971.
- v. Klocke, Friedrich und Theuerkauf, Gerhard: Fürstenbergsche Geschichte, 2nd vol., Die Geschichte des Geschlechtes von Fürstenberg von 1400 bis um 1600, Münster, 1971.
- Lahrkamp, Helmut/Richtering, Helmut et al. (rev.): Fürstenbergsche Geschichte, 3rd vol., Die Geschichte des Geschlechtes von Fürstenberg im 17. Jahrhundert, Münster, 1971.
- Genealogisches Handbuch des Adels, Freiherrliche Häuser, Vol.XV, pp. 135–177, Vol. 69 of the series, C. A. Starke Verlag, Limburg (Lahn), 1989.
- Genealogisches Handbuch des Adels, Adelslexikon Vol. III, p. 420, Vol. 61 of the series, C. A. Starke Verlag, Limburg (Lahn), 1975.
