= Agnes of Milly =

Medieval noblewoman

- Noble family: House of Milly
- Spouse: Joscelin III of Courtenay
- Father: Henry of Milly
- Mother: Agnes Grenier

Agnes of Milly was a noblewoman in the latter half of the twelfth century Kingdom of Jerusalem. Her husband was Joscelin III of Courtenay (c. 1139 – after 1190), titular count of Edessa.

== Background ==
Agnes was the third daughter of Henry of Milly, (died 1164) also called "The Buffalo", lord of Petra, one of the vassal fiefs of the Lordship of Transjordan in the Kingdom of Jerusalem, and Agnes Grenier, probably the daughter of Gerard Grenier, Count of Sidon.

She had three surviving sisters, who all married into the leading families of the Crusader States. Helvis of Milly, who married Adam III of Bethsan; Stephanie of Milly, Lady of Gibelet, who married firstly William Dorel, Lord of Botron, then after his death, secondly Hugh III Embriaco, Lord of Gibelet (Byblos) c. 1179; and Sibille of Milly, who married Eustace "le Petit". Agnes' paternal uncles included Guy of Milly [fr], seneschal of the Kingdom of Jerusalem, and Philip of Milly, the lord of Transjordan and the grand master of the Knights Templar.

Upon her father Henry's death, Agnes inherited his claims to the castles of Montfort and Castellum Regis, making her one of the wealthiest heiresses in the Kingdom of Jerusalem. (Note: See Lignages d’Outre-Mer)

== Marriage ==
On 15 July 1174, Baldwin IV of Jerusalem was crowned king. During his regency, his mother, Agnes of Courtenay was allowed to return to court, and the two became very close. After the murder of Miles of Plancy, for two years the kingdom lacked a seneschal, a powerful officer responsible for overseeing High Court meetings. When Baldwin reached the age of majority in 1176, his mother suggested that he appoint his maternal uncle, Joscelin of Courtenay, to become the kingdom's new seneschal. Baldwin was able to trust Joscelin, since he was his closest male relative who lacked any claim to the throne. Baldwin subsequently arranged Agnes of Milly's marriage to Joscelin around this time, no later than 1176. Joscelin therefore received the castles of Montfort and Castellum Regis by right of Agnes' inheritance. Throughout his life, Joscelin amassed enough land to establish his own lordship, called the "Seigneurie de Joscelin", in 1181.

== Issue ==
With Joscelin, Agnes had two daughters:
1. Beatrix of Courtenay (d. aft. 1245), betrothed to William of Valence, brother of Guy of Lusignan, in 1186, but married Otto von Botenlauben. The couple sold their lands in the Crusader States to the Teutonic Knights and moved to Germany where they founded the Cistercian cloister of Frauenroth in 1231.
2. Agnes of Courtenay, betrothed to a nephew of Guy of Lusignan in 1186, but married, by 1200, William of Amandolea, a Norman from Calabria, who became Lord of Scandeleon

== Sources ==
- Hamilton, Bernard (2000). The Leper King and His Heirs: Baldwin IV and the Crusader Kingdom of Jerusalem. Cambridge University Press. ISBN 9780521017473.
- Pringle, Denys (1998). The Churches of the Crusader Kingdom of Jerusalem: A Corpus: L-Z (excluding Tyre). Vol. II. Cambridge University Press. ISBN 0-521-39037-0.
