= Zahlbach =

Zahlbach may refer to:

- Zahlbach (Mainz), a former independent municipality, now part of the town Mainz, Germany
- Zahlbach (Mergbach), a river of Hesse, Germany, tributary of the Merkbach
- Zahlbach, a district of the municipality Burkardroth, Bavaria, Germany
