= Fürstenberg Castle =

Fürstenberg Castle (German: Burg Furstenberg) may refer to the following castles in Germany:

- Fürstenberg Castle (Rheindiebach), Oberdiebach-Rheindiebach, Rhineland-Palatinate
- Fürstenberg Castle (Hüfingen), Hüfingen-Fürstenberg, Baden-Württemberg
- Fürstenberg Castle (Höingen), Ense-Höingen, North Rhine-Westphalia

== See also ==
- Fürstenberg (disambiguation)
