= Botenlauben Castle =

Castle in Bad Kissingen, Bavaria

Coordinates: 50°11′19″N 10°05′15″E

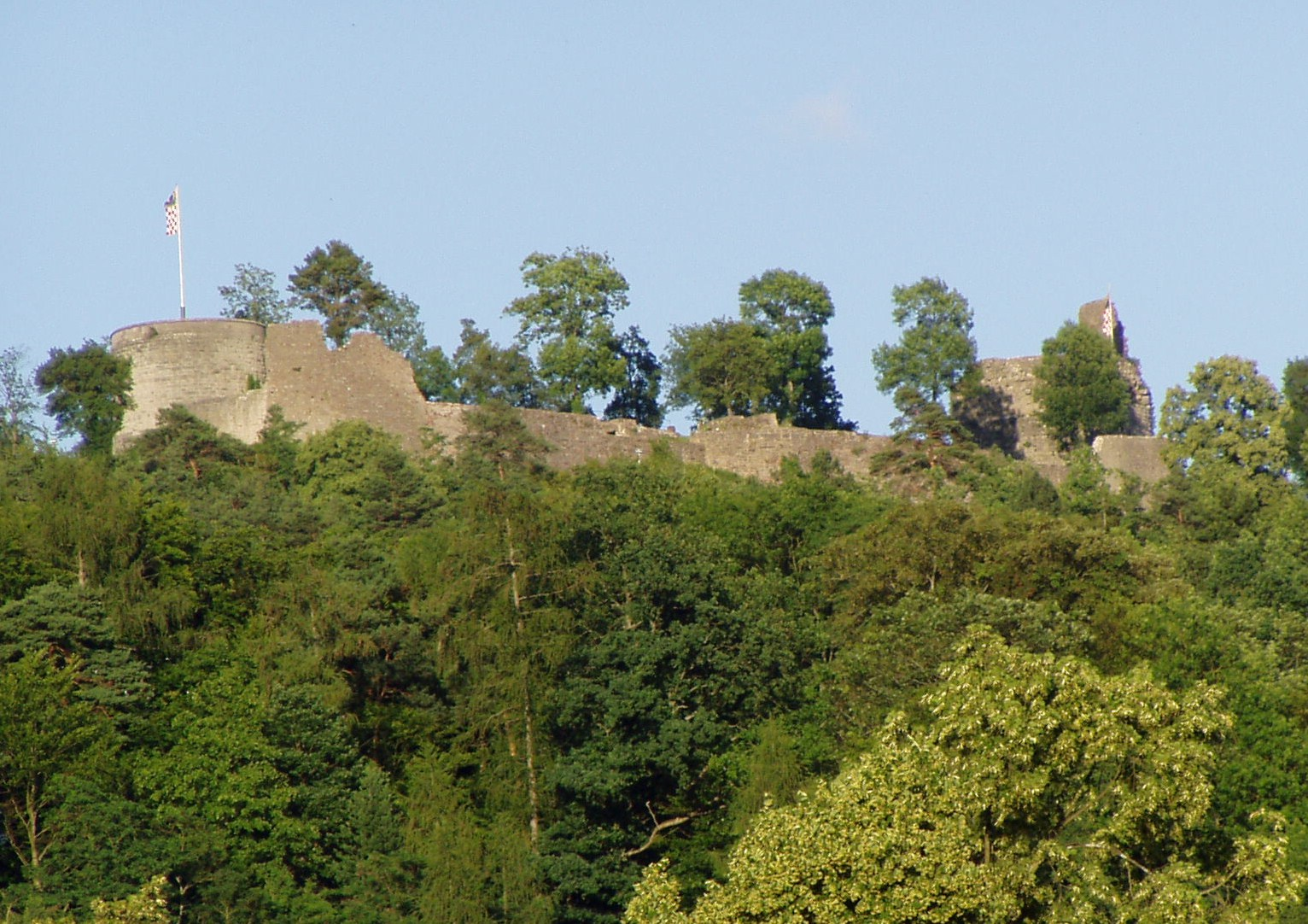

Botenlauben Castle is a ruined castle in Reiterswiesen, a district of the Bavarian spa town of Bad Kissingen.

== History of the castle ==
The castle was home of the minnesinger and crusader Otto von Botenlauben and his wife Beatrix de Courtenay (founders of the Frauenroth cloister), who both stayed from 1220 to 1242. The exact year the castle was built is unknown, but it is generally accepted to be from around 1180. The name probably comes from the words 'Boto' (name of the architect) and Laube (meaning residence). In 1234, the castle came under the control of the Bishopric of Würzburg, under Bishop Hermann I von Lobdeburg. In 1242, the castle became the administrative centre of the diocese's offices. It was eventually moved to Ebernhausen in 1525 following the German Peasants' War, and then completely dissolved in 1670.

During the Peasants' War, the castle fell victim to peasants from Aura an der Saale. Legend has it that the peasants were admitted to the castle by its perfidious cook, who, however, was not rewarded with gold coins but blinded and killed by the peasants; since then, his ghost wanders about the castle in stormy nights chopping on his chopping board.

Following the failed peasants' revolution, they were forced to rebuild the destroyed castle. In 1553, during the 'Margravial war', the castle was destroyed for the last time, and since the 17th century has served as a quarry to the residents of Reiterswiesen.

== Tourism ==
Around 1830, this situation came to an end when people began to take an interest in the Romantic period and the Middle Ages (embodied definitively in 1881 when the ‘Botenlauben club’ was founded). From the beginning, the guiding principle was always to make the castle into a tourist attraction, which became more of an historical interest at the start of the 20th century. In the second half of the century, the castle underwent some restoration work. Today, life in the castle during the Middle Ages is remembered and re-enacted each year in September with the 'Burgfest'.
