= Gloria Guinness =

Mexican socialite

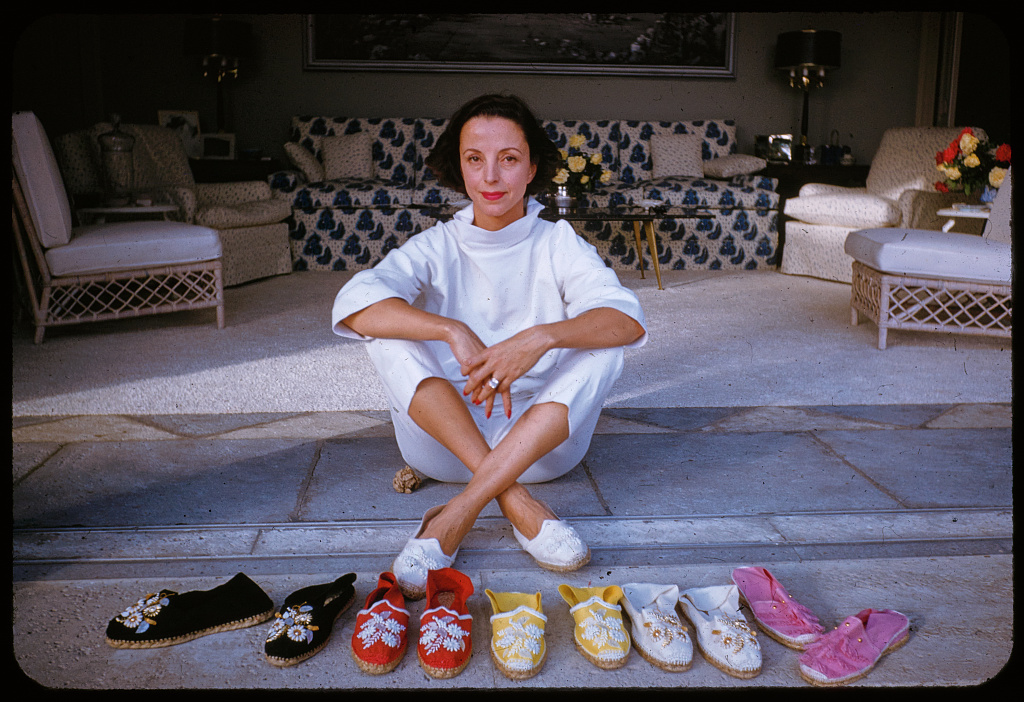
- Guinness in 1954
- Born: Gloria Rubio y Alatorre; 27 August 1912; Guadalajara, Jalisco, Mexico
- Died: 9 November 1980 (aged 68); Epalinges, Switzerland
- Resting place: Bois-de-Vaux Cemetery, Lausanne
- Occupations: Editor, socialite
- Spouses: Jacobus H. Scholtens (m. 1933; div. 1935) Franz Egon Graf von Fürstenberg-Herdringen (m. 1935; div. 1940) Ahmad Fakhry Bey (m. 1942; div. 1949) Thomas "Loel" Guinness (m. 1951)
- Children: 2, including Dolores Guinness

Gloria Guinness (née Rubio y Alatorre; 27 August 1912 – 9 November 1980), previously Countess Gloria von Fürstenberg-Herdringen, was a Mexican socialite and a contributing editor to Harper's Bazaar from 1963 to 1971. She was photographed by Cecil Beaton, Slim Aarons, Alejo Vidal-Quadras; designed for by Cristóbal Balenciaga, Elsa Schiaparelli, Hubert de Givenchy, Yves Saint-Laurent; and was also a close friend and inspiration to Truman Capote.

== Family and childhood ==
Gloria Rubio y Alatorre was born in Guadalajara, Mexico. She was the daughter of José Rafael Rubio y Torres (1880, Michoacán, México – 1916, San Antonio, Texas), a liberal journalist who supported Francisco I. Madero, for which he died in exile in the United States, and his wife, Maria Luisa Alatorre y Diaz-Ocampo (1882–1961, Zapotlán el Grande, Jalisco) who belonged to a Spanish colonial landowning family from Jalisco, who made their fortune in sugar (descendants of conquistador Don Diego de Ochoa-Garibay), partly described by their relative, Alfonso Reyes Ochoa, in his book Parentalia.

Through her paternal family, Gloria was a relative of the celebrated 19th-century art collector Ramón de Errazu y Rubio de Tejada and of the wealthy Mexican aristocrat Jesús Colón de Larreátegui y Vallarta (a direct descendant of the 1st Duke of Veragua, eldest son of Christopher Columbus). Gloria had two elder siblings: Rafael and Maria Luisa.

Gloria's childhood was unstable, mainly because of her father's political persecution during the Mexican Revolution and early death in exile (due to health complications at a health clinic in San Antonio, Texas when Gloria was five). She and her siblings spent most of their childhood with her mother's relatives, members of Mexican elite, such as the Ochoa-Garibay, Villaseñor-Jasso and Sánchez de Aldana families, with whom the Rubios lived for periods of time. Nevertheless, the Cristero War in Jalisco forced both them and their relatives to leave the countryside for Mexico City, where she eventually met her first husband.

=== Legendary origins ===
Without any known explanation, Guinness frequently downplayed or directly lied about her origins, often saying she was from Veracruz, that her father was a revolutionary soldier killed in action, and that her mother was either a laundry maid or a seamstress. Her mysterious true origins were the cause of numerous rumors and speculation, many intended to diminish her social position, but eventually did little to damage her reputation as "the most elegant woman in the World,” in the words of Eleanor Lambert, founder of the Met Gala, New York Fashion Week and the International Best Dressed List.

== Marriages and descendants ==
Gloria Rubio was married four times.

Her first marriage to Jacobus Hendrik Franciscus Scholtens, the Dutch director of a sugar refinery estate in Veracruz took place in Mexico City, on 31 March 1933. Rubio was 20, and the groom, a son of Jan Scholtens and Maria Le Comte, was 47. They separated, shortly afterwards, and they finally divorced, in 1935, with no issue.

Her second marriage was to Franz-Egon Maria Meinhard Engelbert Pius Aloysius Kaspar Ferdinand Dietrich, third Graf von Fürstenberg-Herdringen (1896–1975), whom she married on 4 October 1935, in Kensington, England; this being the second marriage for both and making her a stepmother of actress Betsy von Furstenberg. They were the parents of:

- Dolores Maria Agatha Wilhelmine Luise, Freiin von Fürstenberg-Hedringen (31 July 1936 – 20 January 2012). She married Patrick Benjamin Guinness (her stepbrother) on 22 October 1955, who died in 1965 in a car accident in Switzerland. They were the parents of:
  - Maria Alexandra Guinness (b. 1956), who married Foulques, Count de Quatrebarbes (b. 1948), with issue, in 1979, and, after their divorce, Neville Cook.
  - Loel Patrick Guinness (b. 1957)
  - Victoria Guinness (b. 1960), who married Philip Niarchos in 1984, son of Greek shipping magnate Stavros Niarchos, with issue.
- Franz-Egon Engelbert Raphael Christophorus Hubertus, 4th Graf von Fürstenberg-Hedringen (born 27 July 1939 in Berlin-Wilmersdorf). He married Agneta Sundby (born 12 April 1943), a Swedish model on 20 August 1967, in Visnum church, Visnum, Sweden. After their divorce, he married Adelina von Fürstenberg (née Cuberyan).

Her third marriage was to Ahmad-Abu-El-Fotouh Fakhry Bey (1921–1998), whom she married in 1946 and divorced in 1949. He was a grandson of King Fuad I of Egypt, as the only child of Princess Fawkia of Egypt (later Countess Wladimir d’Adix-Dellmensingen) and her first husband, Mahmud Fakhry Pasha. Through his mother, he was a nephew of King Farouk I of Egypt and Queen Fawzia of Iran (first wife of Mohammed Reza Pahlavi, Shah of Iran). No issue came from this marriage.

Her fourth and final marriage was to Thomas Loel Guinness (1906–1988), Member of Parliament, shareholder of Guinness Mahon, as a member of the banking branch of the Guinness family. They married on 7 April 1951, in Antibes. By this marriage, she had three stepchildren: Patrick Benjamin Guinness (1931–1965), married to her daughter Dolores; William Loel Seymour Guinness (born 1939), and Belinda Guinness (1941-2020), wife of Sheridan Hamilton-Temple-Blackwood, 5th Marquess of Dufferin and Ava.

Among Guinness's alleged lovers, in-between her successive marriages, were David Beatty, 2nd Earl Beatty, and the British ambassador to France Duff Cooper.

== Fashion and cultural icon ==
In 1963, Guinness began a series of columns in Harper's Bazaar. She famously asserted, in the magazine's July 1963 issue, that "Elegance is in the brain, as well as in the body and in the soul. Jesus Christ is the only example we have of any one human having possessed all three at the same time."

=== Artist's subject ===
She was painted by artists like René Bouché, Kenneth Paul Block and Alejo Vidal-Quadras. She was photographed for Vogue, Harper's Bazaar and Women's Wear Daily by Cecil Beaton, Richard Avedon, John Rawlings, Toni Frissell, Horst P. Horst, Slim Aarons and Henry Clarke.

=== Capote's swans ===
Gloria was named, by Truman Capote, as one of his "swans,” a group which included Lee Radziwill, Marella Agnelli, Gloria Vanderbilt, Babe Paley, Diana Vreeland, and others, which he used as inspiration for his characters, most notably in his chapter "La Côte Basque 1965".

=== Fashion ===
Guinness was dressed by various top-couture designers like Cristóbal Balenciaga, Elsa Schiaparelli, Marc Bohan at Christian Dior, Chanel, Hubert de Givenchy, Yves Saint Laurent, Valentino Garavani, Halston and shoes by Roger Vivier.

She was one of the first models to wear capri pants by Emilio Pucci.

Among the 17 outfits, 12 hats and pairs of shoes that she donated to museum collections were a 1948 Balenciaga evening gown of organdy with flock flowers, an evening gown from 1965, a 1949 hand-painted evening gown by Marcelle Chaumont and a 1950s evening gown by Jeanne Lafaurie, the only dress by that designer in the collection of Victoria & Albert Museum.

=== The most elegant woman in the world ===
Despite being voted in second place at Time magazine's "Best Dressed Woman in the World" in 1962, after Jacqueline Kennedy, Eleanor Lambert famously asserted that, without a doubt, Gloria Guinness was "to me, the most elegant woman in the World".

She appeared on the International Best Dressed List from 1959 through 1963. The following year, she was elevated into its Hall of Fame.

=== Design and properties ===
The Guinnesses had an apartment in Manhattan's Waldorf Towers, an 18th-century farmhouse called Villa Zanroc in Épalinges, a 350-ton yacht, an apartment on Avenue Matignon in Paris, decorated by Georges Geffroy, a stud farm in Normandy, Haras de Piencourt, and Gemini, a mansion at Manalapan, Florida.

The Florida property, which is divided by U.S. Highway A1A, faces the lake, on one side, and the ocean, on the other; the two halves of the building, which was designed in the 1940s by architect Marion Syms Wyeth for Gerald Lambert, were ingeniously connected by a sound-proofed living room that was set beneath the bisecting road. In addition, the Guinnesses built a house in Acapulco, Mexico, designed by Mexican architect Marco Aldaco. They also kept three aircraft: an Avro Commander, for short trips around Europe, a small jet, and a helicopter for Loel Guinness's hops between the Manalapan house and the Palm Beach golf course.

== Death ==
In 1980, Gloria Guinness died of a heart attack at Villa Zanroc in Epalinges. She is buried next to her last husband at the Bois de Vaux Cemetery in Lausanne, who was transferred there, after his death in a health clinic in Houston, Texas in 1988.

== See also ==
- House of Fürstenberg (Westphalia)
- King Fuad I of Egypt
- Guinness family
- Alfonso Reyes
- Aline Griffith
