= Joscelin III of Edessa =

Count of Edessa (1139–1191/1199)

Joscelin III
- Seneschal of Jerusalem
- Predecessor: Joscelin II
- Born: c. 1134
- Died: c. 1191/1199
- Spouse: Agnes of Milly
- Issue: Beatrice; Agnes
- House: Courtenay
- Father: Joscelin II
- Mother: Beatrice of Saone
- Religion: Catholicism
- Military career
- Allegiance: County of Edessa (1150); Kingdom of Jerusalem (1158–c. 1191/1199)
- Conflicts: Siege of Turbessel; Battle of Harim; Battle of Montgisard; Siege of Kerak; Battle of Hattin; Siege of Tyre (1187); Third Crusade; Siege of Acre

Joscelin III or Joscelyn III (French: Jocelyn or Josselin; c. 1134 –c. 1191/1199), also called Joscelin of Courtenay, was titular count of Edessa from 1150 or 1159 and a baron of the Kingdom of Jerusalem. The county collapsed during Joscelin's adolescence, and after his father's capture in 1150, he was forced to rebuild his influence elsewhere. Joscelin rebuilt his influence over the next 14 years, receiving some offices and acquiring a martial reputation with the help of his sister Agnes, the wife of Amalric of Jerusalem until 1161. By 1164, he was one of the Christian leaders at the Battle of Harim, but was captured in the disastrous battle and held for the next 12 years.

Joscelin was one of the last high-ranking captives to be released in 1176, alongside Reynald of Châtillon. By then, he was landless, and the two travelled to Jerusalem, which was ruled by his nephew, Baldwin IV. Baldwin made his uncle seneschal by September, and Joscelin married Agnes of Milly. Her dowry was the basis for his lordship, which Joscelin would grow over the next decade into a great seigneury. By 1177, the nobility had split over the marriage of Baldwin's sister, Sibylla, to Guy of Lusignan. Joscelin and Agnes, Sibylla's mother, supported Guy and dominated the kingdom's politics. Guy fell out with the king in 1183 and was replaced as regent by his opponent Raymond of Tripoli in early 1185, with Baldwin dying in March. Sibylla's son Baldwin V became king, and Joscelin was assigned to care for the boy.

Upon Baldwin V's death, Joscelin brought Sibylla to the throne through a coup, angering Raymond of Tripoli and his supporters, but Sibylla unexpectedly raised Guy as her husband. The brewing crisis was cut short when Reynald of Châtillon attacked an Ayyubid merchant convoy in 1186 or early 1187, causing renewed war with Saladin. The subsequent campaign resulted in a crushing defeat at the Battle of Hattin, where Joscelin commanded the rearguard. It is unclear if he was captured here, but he was free shortly afterwards. The seneschal surrendered Acre and his holdings were overrun, but he participated in the sieges of Tyre and Acre. He could have died in the latter engagement, or alternatively lived until around 1200, losing influence. Joscelin has been criticised for his intense greed and support of Guy of Lusignan, often considered incompetent. However, he is considered a competent administrator, and has more recently been characterised as a sober statesman.

== Early life ==
Joscelin III was the son of Joscelin II and Beatrice of Saone. Young Joscelin may have been born around the mid-1130s, most likely 1134, and was at least seven years old by 1141. Over the course of Joscelin's childhood and adolescence, the County of Edessa gradually degraded under Zengid pressure and internal mismanagement. The city of Edessa fell in December 1144 to Imad al-Din Zengi, but continued clashes took place between Joscelin II and Zengi until the latter's death in September 1146, with Joscelin defending the remainder of his county west of the Euphrates. The count attempted to recapture Edessa after hearing of Zengi's death and broke into the city, but Zengi's son, Nur ad-Din, attacked him and destroyed his army. In 1149, the Battle of Inab saw the deaths of Young Joscelin's brother-in-law, Reginald of Marash, and Prince Raymond of Antioch.

Joscelin's family and relationship with the ruling house of Jerusalem. The graph ignores non-essential children.

Guy I of Montlhéry
Hugh of Rethel	Melisende of Crécy	Elisabeth of Montlhéry	Joscelin of Courtenay
Baldwin II of Jerusalem	Morphia of Melitene	Joscelin I of Edessa	Beatrice of Armenia
Fulk of Anjou	Melisende of Jerusalem	Beatrice of Saone	Joscelin II of Edessa
Baldwin III of Jerusalem	Amalric of Jerusalem	Agnes of Courtenay	Joscelin III of Edessa

== Titular count ==
The crusader states around 1165

Joscelin II was captured in Spring 1150 as he was travelling to the Principality of Antioch, allowing the remainder of his county to be rapidly invaded by rival Muslim powers. Beatrice, Joscelin II's wife, organized a resistance, and her supporters raised up Young Joscelin as Count Joscelin III in his father's place. Mesud I of Rum and Nur ad-Din invaded the county, and Mesud seized Kaysun, Raban, Behesni, and Marzban. According to Gregory the Priest, the Edessans "no longer had a leader on whom the remnants of their forces could lean for support." However, Joscelin III successfully defended Turbessel alongside the citizens and his father's men, causing them to retreat. The situation remained untenable; Beatrice sold most of the remnant county to the Byzantine emperor, Manuel I, with Baldwin III of Jerusalem assisting in the exchange. The deal was confirmed by Joscelin III. One castle, Ranculat, was instead sold to Gregory III Pahlavuni, on the condition that it would be returned to Joscelin if he ever returned to power. Despite the Greek garrisons, the towns fell to Mesud and Nur ad-Din.

There is scant evidence for Joscelin's life between 1151 and 1164. According to historian Robert Nicholson, he travelled to Jerusalem with his mother Beatrice and his sister Agnes, where Baldwin enfeoffed him with lands outside of Acre and revenue from its harbour. However, other recent historians suggest that the family first went to Beatrice's lands at Sâone, and that after Agnes' marriage in 1157, they travelled to Jerusalem, at which point Joscelin was enfeoffed. She married Baldwin's younger brother Amalric in 1157, having been widowed from her first husband, Reginald, when he died at Inab. She fought to improve Joscelin's fortunes, and the historian John La Monte characterised her view of Joscelin as "that ambitious affection which caused her to push his interests at every occasion and to secure for him his great position in Jerusalem".

According to John La Monte, Joscelin was made the marshal of Jerusalem in 1156, which made him second-in-command to the constable, in charge of arraying the squadrons for battle, and in charge of inspecting arms and equipment. He seized Burj ar-Risas in 1156 or 1157 (the muslim year 551) and built a lead roof, but Nur ad-Din soon recaptured it. There were other conflicts with Nur ad-Din at this time. Banias was held by the constable, Humphrey II of Toron, and Nur ad-Din besieged it in May until it was relieved by a Jerusalemite army led by King Baldwin. Baldwin disbanded his army before travelling back to Jerusalem but was ambushed at Jacob's Ford, though he escaped. Harim was captured in January 1158, as Nur ad-Din was then ill.

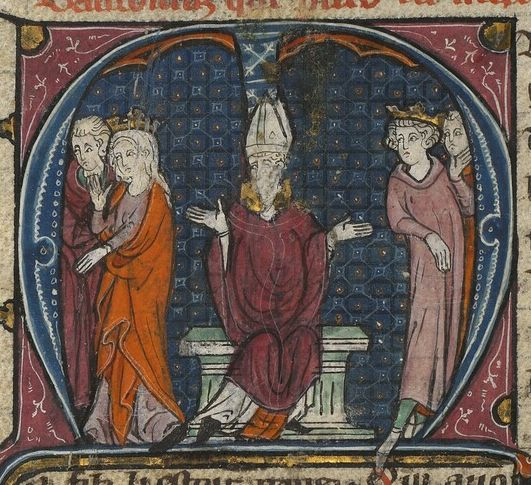
The annulment of Agnes and Amalric's marriage

Joscelin's father died in 1159, still a Christian despite conversion attempts, and he may have been recognised as titular Count of Edessa. Joscelin's tenure as marshal ended in the same year, and he also began launching intensive raids towards Aleppo in retaliation, using Harim, in the Principality of Antioch, as a base. According to Andrew Buck, he only used it as a base, but other historians believe he was made bailli (regent) of Harim by Baldwin in 1160–1161. Joscelin was a leader in the northern Crusader States by the 1160s.

Joscelin's fortunes improved during this period, and he gradually acquired prestige and influence. Contemporary chronicler Ibn al-Athir described Joscelin as "one of the Franks' renowned champions". He was named godfather to his nephew, Agnes' son Baldwin, at his baptism in 1161, a sign of his influence. (Note: According to Steven Runciman, Joscelin was captured a few months before Reynald of Châtillon in 1160 or 1161. However, he is usually placed among the captured nobles at the Battle of Harim.) King Baldwin III died on 10 February 1162, and was succeeded by Amalric. The members of the high court felt threatened by the Courtenays–the house of Joscelin and Agnes–and forced Amalric to annull his marriage to Agnes on the grounds of consanguinity to take up rule. Agnes was thus never queen, but kept the rank of countess, and her children kept their royal status.

== Captivity ==
In 1163, Nur ad-Din was defeated by a united Christian army at the Battle of al-Buqaia. He retaliated in 1164, taking advantage of Amalric's absence in Egypt and besieged Harim. This provoked a northern coalition which included Joscelin, Bohemond III of Antioch, Raymond III of Tripoli, and Hugh VIII of Lusignan, which initially managed to drive off Nur ad-Din. The coalition overeagerly pursued and was crushed, with every leader captured except for Thoros II of Armenia. Harim fell to Nur ad-Din two days later. By the time that Joscelin had been released from captivity, he was probably around 42, but nothing is known about his life while he was captive. Although Agnes, now married to Reginald of Sidon, sought her brother's release, multiple of Joscelin's co-captives were released before him, with Bohemond III being the earliest, released after less than a year, and Raymond III by 1174 at the latest.

Shirkuh, Nur ad-Din's lieutenant, conquered Egypt in 1169, but died soon after, and was succeeded by his nephew, Saladin, with a joint Jerusalemite-Byzantine attempt to dislodge him being unsuccessful. Amalric's death in 1174 and Nur ad-Din's death in the same year allowed Saladin to advance into Syria without significant resistance. Negotiations between Bohemond III and Gumushtekin, atabeg of Aleppo, who had allied with Bohemond against Saladin, saw Gumushtekin release the last of his Christian prisoners in 1176, including Joscelin and Reynald of Châtillon, in exchange for significant sums. Agnes paid part of Joscelin's ransom of 50,000 dinars, and Joscelin also agreed to an alliance with Gumushtekin.

== Count and seneschal ==
=== First years ===
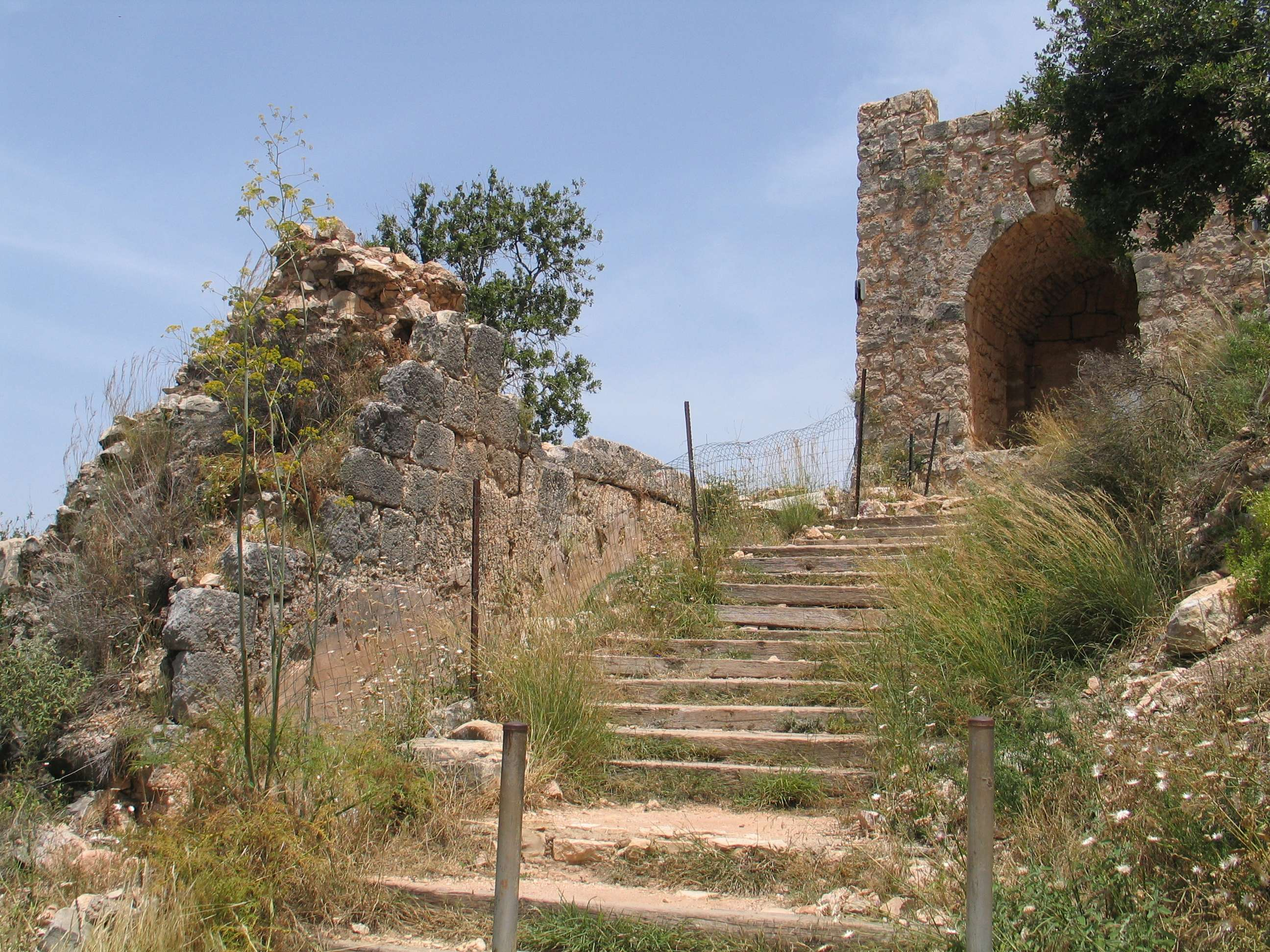
Montfort Castle formed part of the nucleus of Joscelin's lands

Without any lands, Joscelin returned to the Kingdom of Jerusalem and entered the court of the new king, his nephew Baldwin IV, complicating court politics. Raymond III of Tripoli had served as regent since his marriage to Eschiva of Bures in 1174. Joscelin and Reynald took up leadership of a rival, militarily aggressive party to that of Raymond, composed of newcomers and Templars. As the king reached the age of majority in 1176, Raymond was dismissed as regent. Joscelin was appointed as seneschal, a title he received by 23 September of that year. (Note: On a charter dated on 23 September 1176, Joscelin witnesses as Joicilinus regius senescalcus (“Joscelin the royal seneschal”)) Seneschalship included charge over the royal castles, bureaucracy, finances, and ceremonies including the proceedings of the High Court. The seneschal was generally below the constable, but Joscelin was chief minister. La Monte remarked that Joscelin was one of the most powerful nobles to hold the office. The historian Bernard Hamilton views the decision as prudent; Joscelin proved a loyal and competent administrator. On another charter from 1176, he appears as count. (Note: comes Joscelinus (“Count Joscelin”))

Joscelin was married to Agnes of Milly, which netted him as a dowry Chateau du Roi and Montfort Castle, northeast of Acre. He received a fief from Bohemond III which included the revenues of multiple towns and abbeys, which would be returned if he ever regained his Edessan lands. Saladin invaded in autumn of 1177, but his army became relaxed. Baldwin marched against the threat with as many men as he could find but the army, of which Joscelin was a part, was outnumbered. After initially indecisive fighting, the Muslims were routed at the Battle of Montgisard in November, where Joscelin would have been by the king's side.

The seneschal's new lands made up the nucleus for the so-called Seigneury of Count Joscelin, a scattered lordship. Over the course of 1179, he rounded out his estates in the Acre area. In April, he purchased the fief of John de Bellême for 7,500 bezants. His purchase of further lands from Petromilla, the viscountess of Acre, was for 4,500 bezants and was confirmed by 22 October. Joscelin also purchased the territory of St George de Labanea in November. Many Jerusalemite barons held mixed fiefs, and Joscelin was no exception, with rents in Acre, Tyre, and elsewhere. Otherwise, little is known of Joscelin's actions between 1176 and 1180. He appears on nine charters between 1176 and 1180, and his growing importance is reflected in his position as second on witness lists after Reynald of Châtillon.

=== Factional politics ===
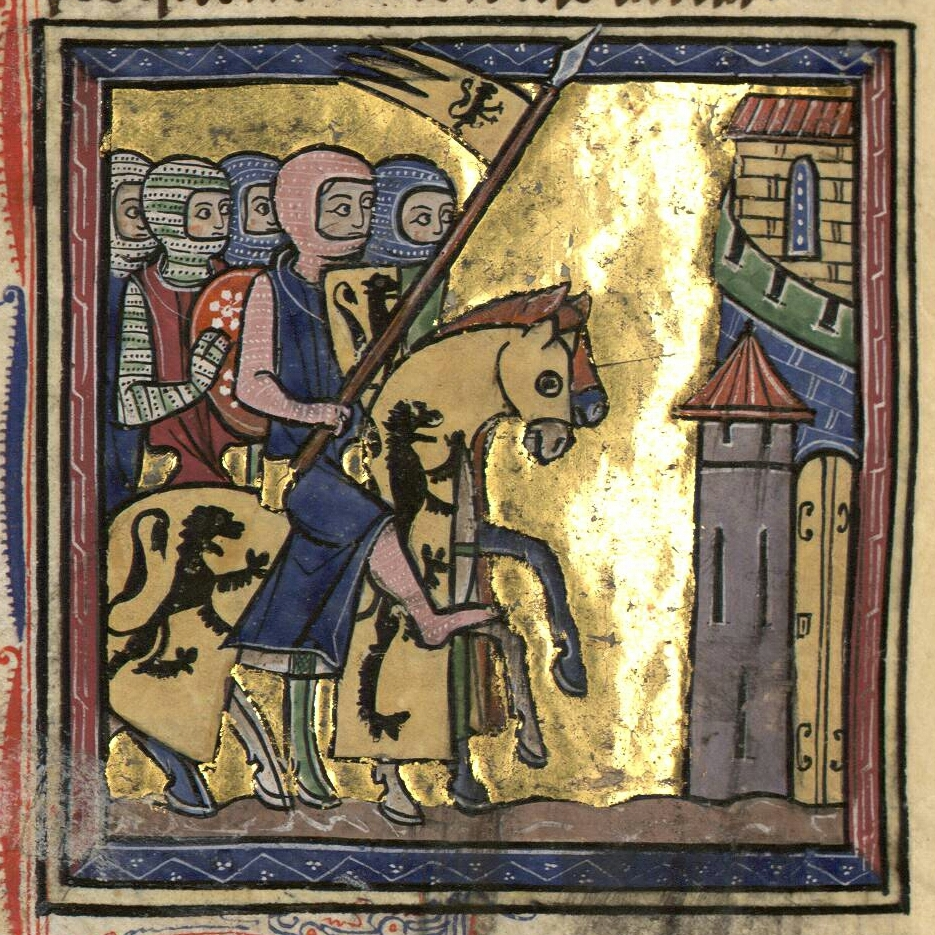
Bohemond and Raymond III of Tripoli ride to Jerusalem in 1180. This is from the narrative of William of Tyre

As Baldwin's leprosy advanced, so did the issue of Sibylla's marriage. She was Baldwin's sister and Agnes' daughter, and her husband could succeed Baldwin as king. Her first husband, William Longsword of Montferrat, died in June 1177 less than a year after their marriage in October 1176. According to Ernoul, who served Balian of Ibelin, Sibylla fell in love with Baldwin of Ibelin (Balian's brother), but he was captured at the Battle of Marj Ayyun. As he travelled to Constantinople to seek aid in paying his ransom, Agnes supported Guy of Lusignan, the younger brother of Amalric of Lusignan, and betrothed him to Sibylla. This has been accepted by multiple historians including Steven Runciman, who considers Ernoul reliable due to his proximity to the Ibelins. However, the story is in the genre of a courtly love narrative, and William of Tyre, who arrived in Jerusalem some weeks after the events, gives a different narrative. According to him, Bohemond of Antioch and Raymond of Tripoli jointly marched to Jerusalem with an army, and as his condition was worsening Baldwin feared a coup. He hastily married Sibylla to Guy in response. This alternative narration is accepted by Robert Nicholson and the more recent Bernard Hamilton, who suggests that they came to choose a husband for Sibylla to decrease the influence of Agnes' relatives. In Malcolm Barber's view, Ernoul "is not a sober writer in the manner of William of Tyre (...) he chose to weave an elaborate and romantic story around this rejection".

In 1180, Joscelin was sent on a diplomatic mission to Constantinople, essentially as an ambassador. Baldwin was eager to confirm that the Franks still needed Byzantine protection and to relay to Emperor Manuel the events of the year, and possibly to coordinate Frankish and Byzantine policy against Saladin and the Seljuks. Manuel died during the course of the visit, and was succeeded by his young son Alexius II. The mission was ultimately successful, as Alexius' mother and regent, Maria of Antioch, renewed the alliance. Joscelin did not return until the summer of 1181, which left an absence in government that was partially filled by the king himself and Joscelin's sister Agnes.

Meanwhile, the nobility split around Sibylla's marriage, establishing a court party centred around the Courtenays including Joscelin and Agnes, allied with the Lusignans and Reynald of Châtillon, which also seems to have opposed Byzantine cooperation. Against them were Bohemond, Raymond, and the Ibelins. Pressing their advantage, the court party siblings promoted Heraclius, the Archbishop of Caesarea, to the Latin Patriarchate of Jerusalem in 1180. William of Tyre opposed Heraclius' appointment and was excommunicated by Heraclius in April 1181. William travelled to Rome, to appeal to the papal court in 1182 or 1183, and died there before more action was taken. When Raymond of Tripoli attempted to visit Tiberias in the Spring of 1182, the advice of Joscelin and Agnes convinced Baldwin to bar him from the kingdom based on the worry that he would attempt another coup, which Hamilton takes as a demonstration of their power. However, a number of other leading barons convinced the king to reconcile with Raymond.

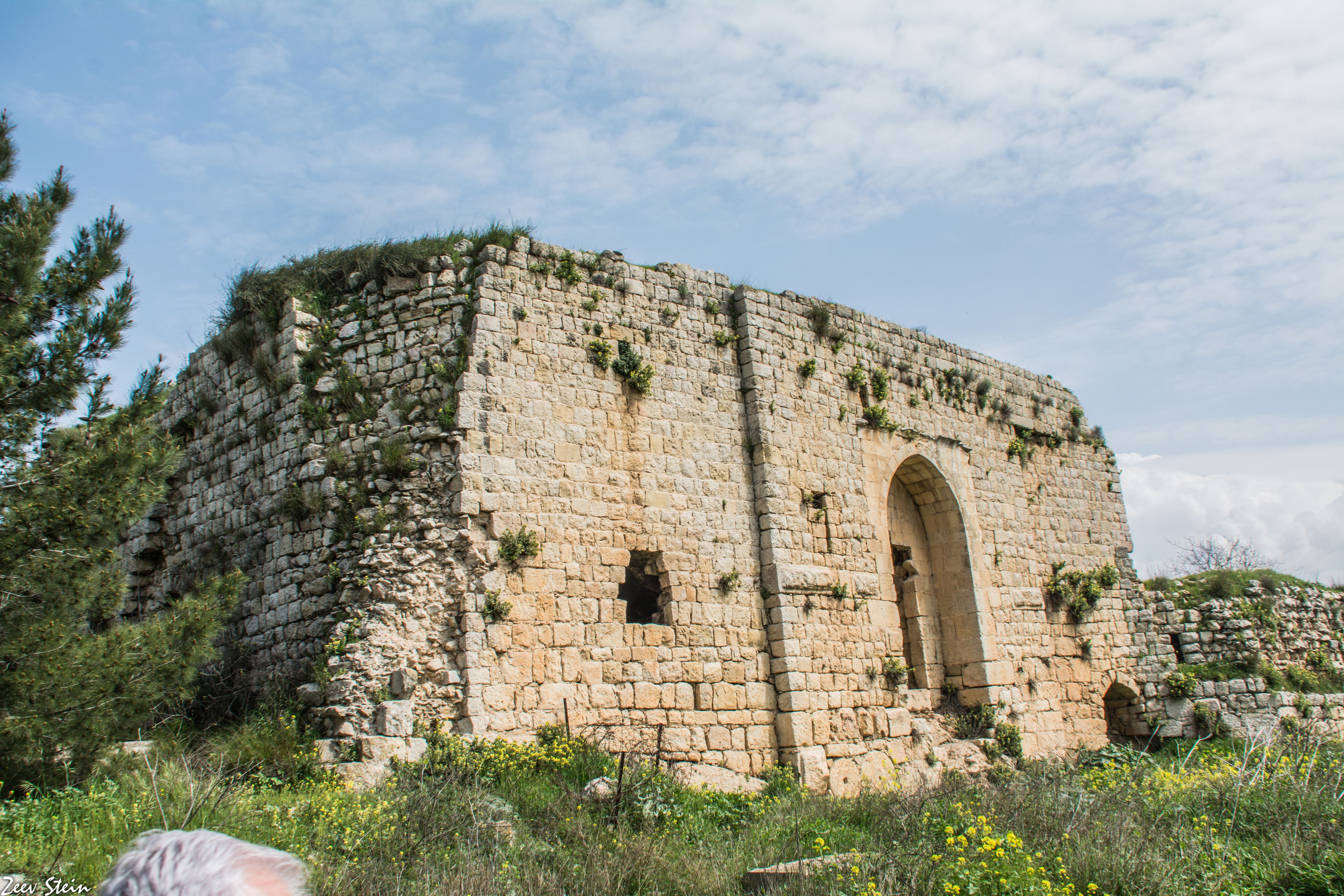
Chastel Neuf, also known as Hunin castle

Joscelin's power continued to clearly rise, and in a charter from 8 November 1181, he is first on the witness list. In two other charters he appeared as third witness. On 6 February 1182, Baldwin confirmed Joscelin's grant of a hundredweight of sugar to the Hospitallers, and Joscelin received multiple grants of revenue from the king in 1181 and 1182, including the fief of Saint Elias. An intentional effect of Baldwin's grants was to leave Joscelin in control of the area around Acre and Tyre. With the consent of Sibylla and Guy, Joscelin exchanged Saint Elias with the important fiefs of Maron and Chastel Neuf (except for the town of Iazun), in what Nicholson called "an apparent plan (...) to bolster his power by a policy of trading lands far removed from his main fief for those closer by and thereby securing the allegiance of his near neighbours". By another exchange, Joscelin received the fealty of John de Lumbres and St George de Labanea in exchange for two towns, Labanie and Carrubie, securing a significant area west and south of his lands. On 19 March 1183, Joscelin purchased 11 towns from Geoffrey Le Tor, and acquired suzerainty over Geoffrey's remaining lands. He also exchanged his fief of Maron for one thousand bezants from the revenues of Acre and the town of Jeth.

=== Campaigns and royal guardian ===
Alarm spread when Saladin conquered Aleppo by 11 June 1183, effectively encircling the Franks. As Baldwin's illness suddenly rapidly worsened, he appointed Guy as bailli (regent) with the promise he would not attempt to take power during the king's lifetime. When Saladin invaded, a new tax had allowed the Christians to raise a significant army, and all the major leaders were present, including Joscelin. In 9 days of fighting, the Franks refused to attack and instead adopted a defensive position, ultimately forcing Saladin to retreat for lack of supplies. The army then returned to its base at Saffuriyah.

Saladin was not long deterred and attacked Kerak after a short rest at Damascus, defended by Reynald and others. Guy's perceived cowardice damaged his reputation, and on 10 November 1183, his hopes of succeeding Baldwin were dashed when he was dismissed as regent. Baldwin once again took up responsibility, and the young Baldwin V was crowned co-king. Reynald was absent from the assembly defending Kerak, and so was Joscelin, though his whereabouts are not known for certain. Hamilton suggests that Joscelin may have also have been at Kerak, while Helen Nicholson believes that Tyre implied his presence among Guy's detractors. Joscelin's presence at either Kerak or the assembly at Jerusalem in 1183 isn't explicitly recorded; in his monograph on Joscelin, Robert Nicholson does not mention him in either place. At Kerak, the defenders were at a serious disadvantage, but a relief mission led by Raymond of Tripoli repulsed Saladin, as he was an experienced general and Baldwin was too sick to command.

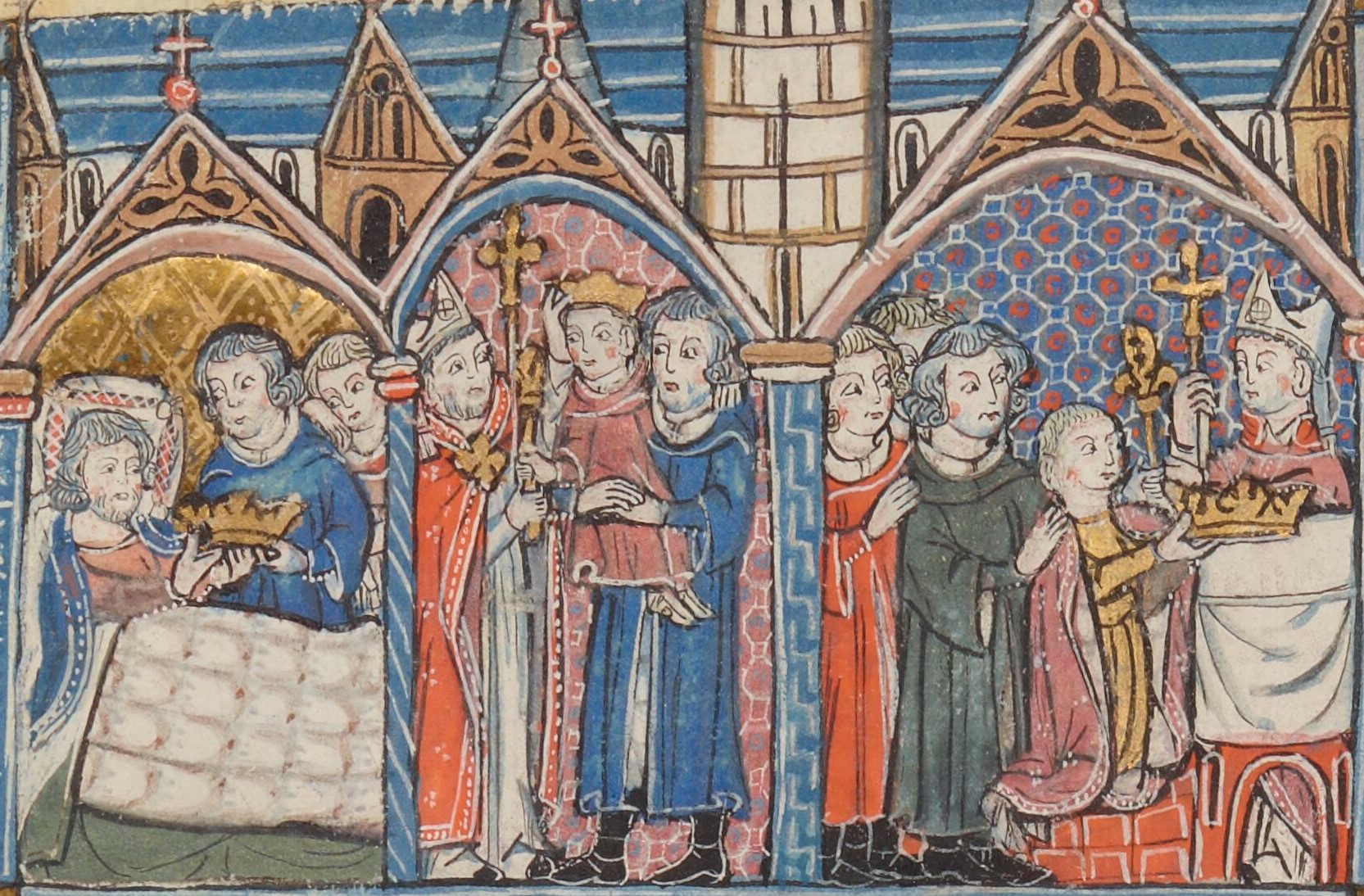
The coronation of Baldwin V and appointment of Raymond as regent

Guy's relationship with the king collapsed around this time. Baldwin sought to deprive Guy of his lordship and successfully seized his land at Jaffa by breaking into the city, but it was clear that Guy would not surrender without a fight. Heraclius and the masters of the military orders attempted to intercede with Baldwin for Guy to avoid a civil war, but were not heard, and withdrew in anger. Raymond was appointed as regent probably around early 1185 for Baldwin V until he reached the age of majority, which would be in 10 years. (Note: Other estimates date the appointment to December 1183 or early 1184, maintaining the 10-year timespan.) He refused to serve as Baldwin V's guardian, for fear that if the boy died, he would be blamed. That position instead went to Joscelin, the boy's great-uncle, who took care of him "as well as he could" in Acre. Another stipulation was that if Baldwin V died prematurely, Raymond would remain regent with the barons' support until the Pope, the Holy Roman Emperor, and the kings of England and France could decide on his successor. All castles were given to the military orders, but Raymond was left with Beirut to pay for his expenses.

The leper-king, Baldwin IV, died a few weeks later in March of 1185, sometime before 16 May. Agnes also died around this time, sometime between September 1184 and 21 October 1186. Joscelin executed her will "satisfactorily." Despite her death, Joscelin controlled the kingdom's administration, helping place a limit on the regent's authority. Saladin renewed his attacks and attacked Kerak and other towns, but after failing to take the castle, he agreed to a truce. Baldwin V was able to succeed to the throne without incident after his uncle's death. The peace allowed Joscelin to continue enlarging his territory, helped by favors from his royal ward. Joscelin purchased two fiefs from Guy and Sibylla in February 1185, which had originally belonged to the late Agnes. In a charter from 16 May 1185, Joscelin was the second witness behind Reynald of Châtillon.

== Last years ==
=== Queenmaker ===
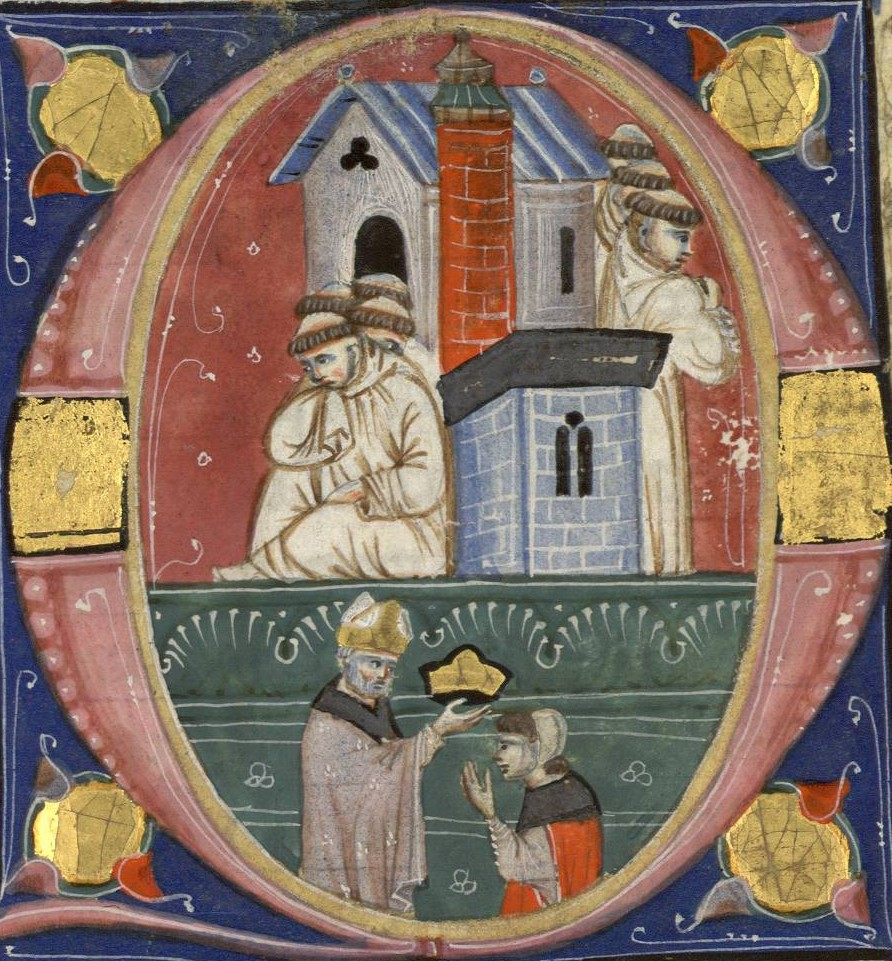
The coronation of Sibylla

Baldwin V died in Acre, in August 1186. Joscelin saw his opportunity and reacted by seizing power; according to Ernoul, he visited Raymond of Tripoli and convinced him to travel to Tiberias while Joscelin and the Templars took the boy's body to Jerusalem, where he would be buried. It has been pointed out that this story, as related by Ernoul, would require Raymond to place an unusually high amount of trust in Joscelin, and Raymond may have agreed to travel to Tiberias to muster his own supporters. With Raymond gone, Joscelin occupied Tyre, Raymond's fief of Beirut, and Acre for Sibylla, securing most of the royal domain. Sibylla, Guy, Joscelin, and their allies stayed at the king's funeral, and Reynald of Châtillon successfully won popular support in Acre.

As lawful regent, Raymond summoned his supporters to Nablus. Based on Ernoul's account, Sibylla's supporters were largely centred on Joscelin and Reynald, but the two figures were powerful enough to establish a political base with the allegiance of the Templars, Hospitallers, and Patriarch Heraclius. Hamilton suggests that Sibylla's support base was significant and that Raymond had underestimated her. Under pressure from her supporters, Sibylla agreed to divorce Guy on the condition that he retained his counties of Jaffa and Ascalon, their children were legitimised, and that she could choose her new husband herself. Perhaps believing that they had won good faith by ousting Guy, Sibylla's party invited the nobles at Nablus to her coronation. They refused, sending two Cistercian monks to forbid it. Roger of Moulings, the Grand Master of the Hospitallers, held out for a few hours in Acre. He ultimately gave in and swore off responsibility, allowing Sibylla to be crowned late in the summer, possibly in September. Although Guy remained unpopular even among Sibylla's supporters, she surprised those assembled by choosing Guy as her husband once again. Joscelin was the driving force behind Sibylla's accession, and Nicholson calls him "[the coup's] prime mover and author".

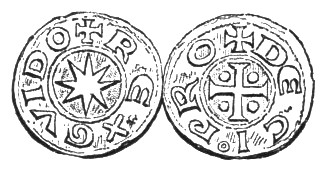
Coin of Guy as King of Jerusalem

The Nablus faction attempted to crown Humphrey of Toron, whose wife, Isabel, was the younger half-sister of Sibylla, but he instead fled to Sibylla and did homage to her. At the site of this, almost the entire baronage save for Raymond and Baldwin of Ibelin surrendered to Sibylla. Shortly afterwards, Guy held his first assembly at Acre. Baldwin of Ibelin was summoned to pay homage, but he instead saluted the king, and left his lands at Ramla to his son Thomas, who would pay homage when he came of age. Baldwin himself travelled to Antioch and was welcomed by Bohemond III, an enemy of Guy's party. Gerard de Ridefort, the Master of the Templars and a personal enemy of Raymond of Tripoli, advised Guy to besiege him in his stronghold of Tiberias and force his surrender. Raymond responded by placing himself under Saladin's protection and allowing Muslim troops into Tiberias, causing Guy to retreat so as to not renew the war. Some contemporaries took this to mean that Raymond was colluding with Saladin to become king.

On 21 October 1186, as a reward for bringing him to power, Guy granted Joscelin the fiefs of Banias and Toron, currently under Muslim occupation. Humphrey of Toron formerly held them, but he exchanged them in 1180 for a money-fief of 7,000 bezants. If the High Court returned them to Humphrey, Joscelin would be compensated with the revenues that Humphrey had traded for them. Joscelin also allied with Guy, allowing the king to choose the guardians of his two daughters if he died prematurely, and marrying them to Guy's family members. As a result of his several exchanges in the past decade, Joscelin was left with the entire mountainous territory from Acre, which he held, to Tyre, and additional wealth from his many money-fiefs.

=== Hattin Campaign ===
Reynald of Châtillon attacked a merchant convoy in 1186 or early 1187, and went away with considerable booty. This action threatened the truce, as when Saladin complained to Guy, Reynald was not punished. This put pressure on Raymond, who could no longer claim that Saladin was simply assisting him against Guy. As it became clear that Saladin would not renew the truce, set to expire on 5 April 1187, Guy met with the High Court after Easter (29 March 1187). By the time the meeting had ended, Saladin had already declared war. Saladin launched a full-scale invasion of the kingdom and besieged Kerak and Montreal, trapping Reynald in his castle. Saladin's son Al-Afdal sent a force to raid around Acre, and a severely outnumbered force from the military orders led by Gerard of Ridefort was crushed at the Battle of Cresson on 1 May 1187.

On 1 May, Raymond fell to his knees before King Guy at the Hospitaller castle of St. Job, and was lifted up by the king. Raymond also agreed to send away all the Muslim troops in Tiberias, and all parties mustered their armies at Saffuriyah. Bohemond of Antioch also sent aid in the form of 50 knights under the command of his son, Raymond of Antioch. Despite the sudden unity, there remained a suspicion of Raymond, which Joscelin likely held as well. Guy summoned all of the tenants-in-chief of the Kingdom of Jerusalem to his side, including Joscelin. Using the money deposited by Henry II of England, the crusaders assembled "the largest army ever mustered by the Franks" near Nazareth, with 12,000 men including 1,200 knights. A disagreement took place among the Frankish high command, as Saladin had now invaded Tiberias, placing Raymond of Tripoli's wife Eschiva under great threat. Raymond advocated a defensive strategy under the summer heat, hoping that Saladin would either retreat or advance, opening himself up to counterattack. By contrast, Reynald and Gerard successfully convinced Guy to attack and relieve Tiberias by questioning Raymond's loyalty.

The difficult march, almost entirely without water, and persistent Muslim harassment weakened the army, and Saladin's generals prevented the Franks from reaching another source of water further on. The Franks reached the Horns of Hattin by the afternoon of 3 July. Saladin and his army were able to surround the Franks and kill all those in search of water by Saturday, 4 July, as well as lighting fires to create blinding smoke. At the Battle of Hattin, Raymond of Tripoli, his stepsons, and Raymond of Antioch commanded the vanguard, while Joscelin and Balian of Ibelin commanded the rearguard. Either on his own initiative or Guy's command, Raymond charged, possibly with Joscelin. They were let through and made their way to Tyre. The rest of the army was crushed, and all of its main leaders captured. Although Ernoul's Eracles claims that Joscelin managed to escape with Raymond's group, all other primary sources report his capture, but he was apparently freed shortly afterwards.

=== Decline ===
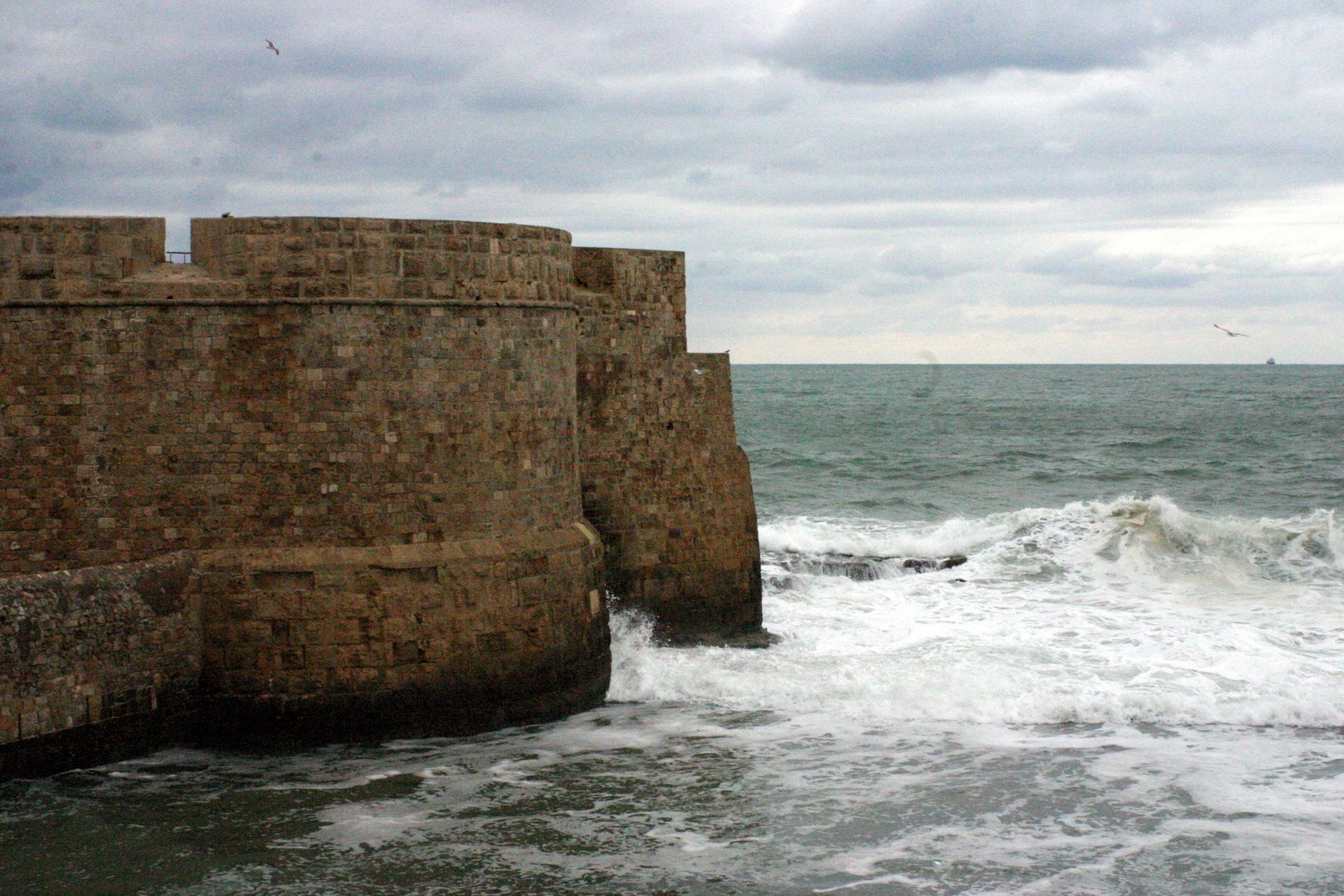
The western sea wall of Acre, which Joscelin surrendered to Taqi ad-Din

Joscelin managed to make his way to Acre as Taqi ad-Din, Saladin's general, was ordered to seize it on 7 July. Joscelin took counsel with the burgesses. On their advice, he surrendered the stronghold to Taqi ad-Din two days later with the understanding that the population could depart freely. Historians have criticised Joscelin for his failure to put up a defence, though other crusader strongholds that held fell as well. Shortly afterwards, the rest of Joscelin's holdings, alongside most of the kingdom's inland fortresses, were overrun by Saladin.

Joscelin participated in the defense of Tyre, alongside the rest of the refugee barons and the acting heads of the religious orders. The city quickly proved too difficult and Saladin moved on to easier targets. Joscelin was a witness and signatory to the agreement with the Genoese in July 1187, who alongside the Pisans had agreed to support the crusaders for economic benefits. That, and the strengthening of its fortifications allowed the defenders of Tyre to hold out again when Saladin returned in November.

Guy was freed by Saladin in 1188, and immediately he rallied all the available Crusader forces and launched a siege of Acre, which began to drag on. He was reinforced by crusaders from the west, as well as Crusader barons including Joscelin. Saladin led a relief attempt that was repulsed by Conrad of Montferrat, but his naval forces choked the crusaders and caused a shortage of food and water, causing the rivalry between Conrad and Guy to be put aside. The seneschal Joscelin attested a charter of Guy on 10 April 1190, giving rights within Acre to the citizens of Amalfi. Guy and Sibylla gave out several grants to western groups, and Joscelin was witness to these on 25 October and mid-September 1190. The arrival of a grain ship in March 1191, and the arrival of Richard I of England and Philip II of France in April, and Acre fell soon afterwards.

Joscelin's later career is unclear to the point that "the date of his death cannot be determined with certainty". He may have died during the siege of Acre, identified with a comes Ioscelinus reported to have fell. If he lived, Joscelin's political situation would have been fatally undermined by Guy leaving to rule the Kingdom of Cyprus, leaving Isabel and her new husband Henry II of Champagne, and ending the Lusignan-Courtenay alliance. Nicholson's estimate of his death is around 1199–1200, and by this view he would have lived to be replaced as seneschal in January 1194. After an absence in any record, he may have been the Joscelin (with no title) who witnessed a 26 August 1199 charter.

== Assessment ==
During his stay as seneschal under Baldwin IV, he was seemingly chiefly responsible for royal finances, and in this position he was both highly competent and loyal, in Hamilton's view. Robert Nicholson calls his tenure "not outstanding," but "certainly respectable".

In Nicholson's view, Joscelin had the potential to perform as well in war as his grandfather, Joscelin I, and was respected as a military leader during the 1150s and 60s before his capture at Harim. However, after 1181, Nicholson also points to an increasing "lack of clarity" in judgement based on his support of the "patently incompetent" Guy of Lusignan; he contrasts Joscelin's "pathetic" later career with his "outstanding military and political record" earlier on. Jean Richard, following William of Tyre, openly accused Joscelin and Agnes as openly appropriating funds from the royal treasury. He called Joscelin "the most grasping of them all" and accused him of enriching himself at the expense of the crown.

The characterization of Joscelin and his sister Agnes as "ignorant warmongers," has recently been criticised by historian Helen J. Nicholson. In her view, Joscelin was an experienced and respected political actor, and having experienced its privations was "under no illusions about the costs of war". Part of the reason for Joscelin's reputation was William of Tyre, who was completely opposed to his political faction. This negative reputation also extended to his sister, Agnes, whom Hamilton alternatively characterizes as "a worthy daughter-in-law of Queen Melisende" and "clearly a remarkably clever woman".

In the view of Hans Eberhard Mayer, Joscelin began as a "count without a county", but rose to become seneschal and, "through sheer greed," succeeded in building up the Seigneury of Count Joscelin in the region of Acre. John LaMonte called Joscelin's lordship "one of the greatest seigneuries in the East", but without the traditional cohesive structures of other lordships, "only the shrewd and ambitious policy of Count Joscelin gave it unity". Joscelin's ambitions, in La Monte's view, may have been largely fulfilled by 1186, having attained control of the area between Acre and Tyre in "a most noble fief," but his gains were washed away by Saladin.

== Marriage and children ==
After his release from captivity in 1176, Joscelin married Agnes of Milly, third daughter of Henry "the Buffalo" of Milly, Lord of Petra, (and a sister of Stephanie of Milly and Helvis de Milly); by whom he had two daughters:

1. Beatrice (d. aft. 1245), betrothed to William of Valence, brother of Guy of Lusignan, in 1186, but married Otto von Botenlauben
2. Agnes, betrothed to a nephew of Guy of Lusignan in 1186, but married, by 1200, William of Amandolea, a Norman from Calabria, who became Lord of Scandeleon

== Sources ==
- Baldwin, Marshall W. (1969). "The Latin States under Baldwin III and Amalric I; The Decline and Fall of Jerusalem". In Setton, Kenneth M. (ed.). A History of the Crusades. Vol. I. University of Wisconsin Press.
- Barber, M. (2012). The Crusader States. Yale University Press.
- Buck, Andrew D. (2017). The Principality of Antioch and Its Frontiers in the Twelfth Century. The Boydell Press.
- Dostourian, Ara Edmond, ed. (1993). Armenia and the Crusades: Tenth to Twelfth Centuries: The Chronicle of Matthew of Edessa. National Association for Armenian Studies and Research. ISBN 0819189537.
- Edbury, Peter W. (1996). The Conquest of Jerusalem and the Third Crusade: Sources in Translation. Ashgate.
- Hamilton, Bernard (1978). "Women in the Crusader States: The Queens of Jerusalem" (PDF). In Derek Baker (ed.). Medieval Women. Ecclesiastical History Society.
- Hamilton, Bernard (2000). The Leper King and his Heirs:Baldwin IV and the Crusader Kingdom of Jerusalem. Cambridge University Press.
- Gibb, H.A.R. (1969). "Zengi and the Fall of Edessa". In Setton, Kenneth M. (ed.). A History of the Crusades. Vol. I. University of Wisconsin Press.
- La Monte, John L. (1932). Feudal Monarchy in the Latin Kingdom of Jerusalem 1100 to 1291. Medieval Academy of America.
- La Monte, John L. (1938). The Rise and Decline of a Frankish Seigneury in Syria in the Time of the Crusades. Revue historique du sud-est européen (in French). Vol. 15. pp. 301–330.
- La Monte, John L. (1942). "The Lords of Le Puiset on the Crusades". Speculum. 17 (1): 100–118. doi:10.2307/2856610. JSTOR 2856610. S2CID 225089973.
- Lilie, Ralph-Johannes (1993). Byzantium and the Crusader States 1096-1204. Oxford University Press. ISBN 0-19-820407-8.
- Mayer, Hans Eberhard (1988) [1965]. The Crusades. Translated by Gillingham, John (2nd ed.). Oxford University Press.
- Murray, Alan V. (2006). "Joscelin III of Edessa". In Murray, Alan V. (ed.). The Crusades: An Encyclopedia. Vol. 1. Bloomsbury Publishing. pp. 698–699. ISBN 1576078639.
- Nicholson, Robert L. (1969). "The Growth of the Latin States, 1118-1144". In Setton, Kenneth M. (ed.). A History of the Crusades. Vol. I. University of Wisconsin Press.
- Nicholson, Robert L. (1973). Joscelyn III and the Fall of the Crusader States, 1134–1199. Brill.
- Nicholson, Helen J. (2022). Sybil, Queen of Jerusalem, 1186–1190. Routledge. ISBN 978-1-138-63651-4., doi:10.4324/9781315205960
- Riley-Smith, Jonathan (1973). The feudal nobility and the kingdom of Jerusalem, 1147 - 1277. Macmillan.
- Richard, Jean (1979). The Latin Kingdom of Jerusalem. North-Holland. ISBN 0444850929.
- Richards, D.S., ed. (2010). The Chronicle of Ibn al-Athīr for the Crusading Period. London: Routledge. ISBN 978-0-7546-6950-0.
- Runciman, Steven (1989). A History of the Crusades, Volume II: The Kingdom of Jerusalem and the Frankish East, 1100-1187. Cambridge University Press. ISBN 0-521-06163-6.
- Tyerman, Christopher (2006). God's War: A New History of the Crusades. The Belknap Press of Harvard University Press. ISBN 978-0-674-02387-1.
- Pringle, D. (1998). The Churches of the Crusader Kingdom of Jerusalem: A Corpus: L-Z (excluding Tyre). Vol. II. Cambridge University Press. ISBN 0-521-39037-0.

Joscelin III of Edessa House of Courtenay Born: c. 1134 Died: c. 1191/1199
Vacant Title last held by Miles of Plancy	Seneschal of Jerusalem; 1176–c. 1191/1194	Vacant Title next held by Ralph of Tiberias
Vacant Title last held by Joscelin II	Count of Edessa; 1159–c. 1191/1199	Next: Beatrix
