= Henry of Milly =

Crusader noble of the 12th-century

- Coat of arms of the House of Milly
- Died: After 16 July 1164
- Spouse: Agnes Grenier
- Issue: Helvis of Milly; Stephanie of Milly; Agnes of Milly; Sibille of Milly
- Father: Guy of Milly
- Mother: Stephanie of Nablus

Henry of Milly (died 1164), also known as Henry the Buffalo (Henri le Bufle) (Latin: Henricus Bubalus), was the lord of Petra, one of the vassal fiefs of the Lordship of Transjordan in the Kingdom of Jerusalem.

== Early life ==
Henry was the son of Guy of Milly, lord of Nablus, and Stephanie the Fleming. He was the brother of Guy Francigena, seneschal of the Kingdom of Jerusalem, and Philip of Milly, lord of Transjordan and grand master of the Knights Templar.

== Career ==
Henry appears in 1155 as a witness to a charter in which Queen Melisende of Jerusalem confirms a donation from Hugh of Ibelin and Baldwin of Ibelin to the Church of the Holy Sepulchre, and another charter in the same year in which Philip of Milly made a donation to the Order of St. Lazarus. He also witnessed a charter of King Amalric in 1164.

== Marriage ==
One manuscript of the Lignages d'Outremer indicates that the wife of "Henry the Buffalo" (Note: Henri le Bufle) was the sister of Reginald, lord of Sidon," (Note: la suer de Renaut seigneur de Seete) but this seems unlikely, as Reginald's parents married in around 1138. Another manuscript of the Lignages d'Outremer mentions "Girart and Gautier, and Agnes who married Henry the Buffalo" (Note: Girart et Gautier, et Agnes qui espousa Henri le Bufle) as the children of "Gerard Grenier … lord of Caesarea" (Note: Huistace Garnier … sire de Cesaire) and his wife "Agnes, the niece of the patriarch Ernoul of Jerusalem" (Note: Heimeline, la niesse dou patriarche Ernoul de Jerusalem) but this statement is also an anachronism. Regardless, it seems certain that Agnes is a member of the Grenier family, and the most likely solution is that she is the daughter of Gerard Grenier.

In any case, the couple had children:

- Helvis de Milly, who married Adam III of Bethsan
- Stephanie of Milly, who was married firstly to William Dorel, lord of Botron, then to Hugh III Embriaco, lord of Gibelet
- Agnes of Milly, who married Joscelin of Courtenay, titular count of Edessa
- Sibille of Milly, who married Eustace "le Petit"
