= Kenneth Paul Block =

American fashion illustrator (1924–2009)

Kenneth Paul Block (July 26, 1924 – April 23, 2009) was an American fashion illustrator. He was an in-house artist for Fairchild Publications, owner of Women's Wear Daily and its offshoot, W.

== Early life ==
Kenneth Paul Block was born in New Rochelle, New York, on July 26, 1924. He grow up in Larchmont, New York, in the 1930s. Block was enthralled by the glamorous film stars of the era and by the fashion artists then working for Vogue and Harper's Bazaar. Dance and music also influenced his developing artistic style. In 1945, he graduated from the Parsons School of Design. His long-term companion was Morton Ribyat.

== Career ==
Block began a career as a fashion illustrator, even though photography had overtaken it as the primary method of introducing new styles. He joined Fairchild Publications in the mid-1950s. Early assignments included sketching New York ladies on Easter Sunday as they exited churches in their holiday finery, hats and gloves included. Block lamented that hats and gloves declined in popularity in the 1960s, as he felt they gave fashion a form of dignity. He stayed with Fairchild until 1992 when all the company's artists were let go on the same day.

Concurrent with his editorial work, and for a dozen years after his career at Fairchild ended, Block created a portfolio of commercial fashion art, including drawings made during successive long-term contracts with the specialty stores Bonwit Teller, Bergdorf Goodman, and Lord & Taylor. Other commercial clients included Halston, Perry Ellis, and Coach. When Diana Vreeland joined the Metropolitan Museum of Art's Costume Institute, she turned to Block to draw the poster for her first exhibit on Cristóbal Balenciaga. He also created a drawing for Vreeland's "American Women of Style" exhibit.

Block painted the designs of many fashion designers, including Norman Norell, Yves Saint Laurent, Pierre Cardin, Coco Chanel, James Galanos, Givenchy, Pauline Trigère, Bill Blass, Halston, and Geoffrey Beene. Among the society women who posed for him were Babe Paley, Gloria Vanderbilt, Jacqueline de Ribes, Amanda Burden, The Duchess of Windsor, and Gloria Guinness. The women in Block's drawings were known for exuding a passive sort of chic. "Gesture to me is everything in fashion," he said.

Block died on April 23, 2009.
