= Ferdinand of Fürstenberg =

Ferdinand of Fürstenberg may refer to the following members of the German nobility:

- Ferdinand of Fürstenberg (1626–1683), Prince Bishop of Paderborn and Münster, member of House of Fürstenberg (Westphalia)
- Ferdinand of Fürstenberg (1661–1718), Drost in the Duchy of Westphalia, member of House of Fürstenberg (Westphalia)

== See also ==
- Fürstenberg (disambiguation)
