= Fürstenberg-Geisingen =

Fürstenberg-Geisingen was a county in southern Baden-Württemberg, Germany during the Middle Ages. A partition of Fürstenberg-Fürstenberg, it was inherited by the Counts of Fürstenberg-Baar in 1483.

== Counts of Fürstenberg-Geisingen (1441 - 1483) ==
- John VI (1441 - 1443)
- Egon VI (1443 - 1483)
