= Burkardroth =

- Municipality
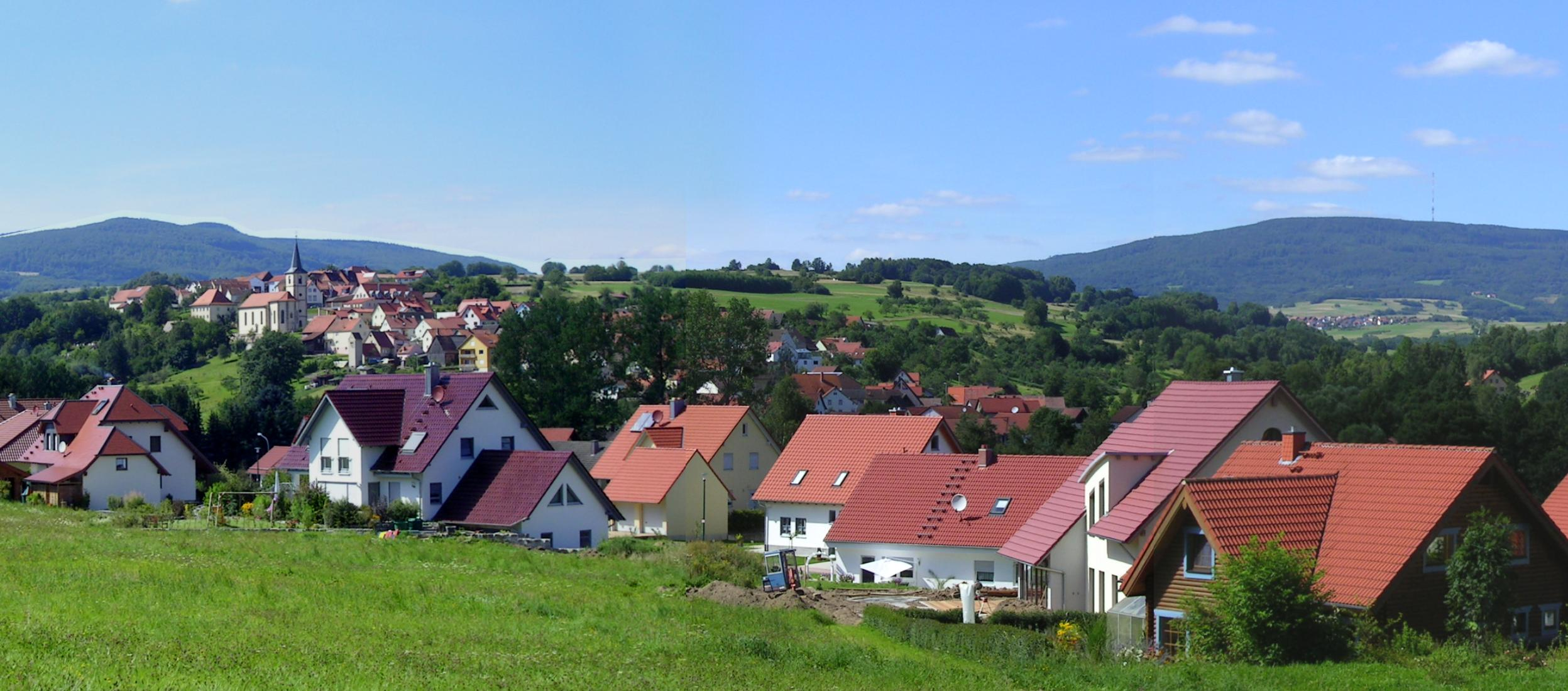
- Panoramic view of the municipal part of Premich

- Coat of arms

- Location of Burkardroth within Bad Kissingen district
- Interactive map of Burkardroth
- Location within Germany Location within Bavaria
- Coordinates: 50°16′19″N 9°59′22″E
- Country: Germany
- State: Bavaria
- Admin. region: Unterfranken
- District: Bad Kissingen
- Subdivisions: 12 Ortsteile

Government
  - Mayor (2020–26): Daniel Wehner

Area
  - Total: 69.11 km^{2} (26.68 sq mi)
- Elevation: 304 m (997 ft)

Population (2025-12-31)
  - Total: 7,256
  - Density: 105.0/km^{2} (271.9/sq mi)
- Time zone: UTC+01:00 (CET)
  - Summer (DST): UTC+02:00 (CEST)
- Postal codes: 97705
- Dialling codes: 09734
- Vehicle registration: KG
- Website: www.burkardroth.de

Burkardroth is a municipality in the district of Bad Kissingen in Bavaria in Germany.

== Geography ==
Burkardroth lies on the south boundary of the biosphere reserve Rhön about 14 km northwest of the district capital of Bad Kissingen. On the north, it borders on the district of Rhön-Grabfeld.

== Divisions of the municipality ==
There are 12 towns in the municipality:

- Burkardroth
- Frauenroth
- Gefäll
- Katzenbach
- Lauter
- Oehrberg
- Premich
- Stangenroth
- Stralsbach
- Waldfenster
- Wollbach
- Zahlbach

== History ==
The present municipality (Marktgemeinde) was created in 1972.

== Sister cities ==
- Ense, district of Soest, North Rhine-Westphalia

== Sightseeing ==
The most important architectural monuments are the church of St. Peter, which dates from the 17th century, and the chapel of the former Cistercian monastery of Frauenroth.
