= Beatrice of Courtenay =

Beatrix de Courtenay
- Countess of Edessa, Countess of Henneburg
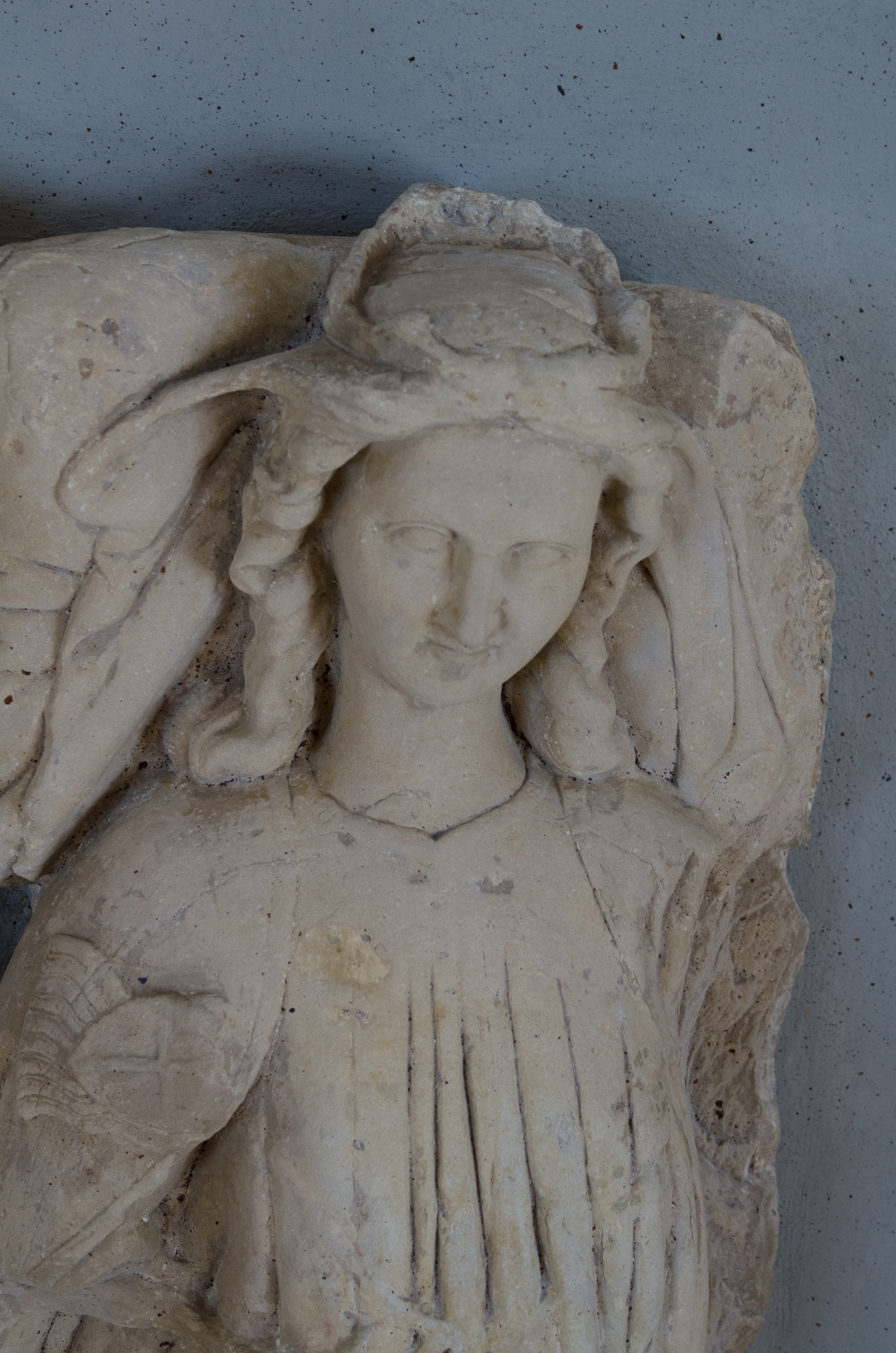
- Spouse: Otto von Botenlauben
- Issue: Otto II Graf von Henneberg-Botenlauben-Hildenburg, Henry, Albert
- Father: Joscelin III of Edessa
- Mother: Agnes of Milly

Beatrix de Courtenay (died after 1245) was a Titular Countess of Edessa and Countess consort of Henneberg as the wife of Otto von Botenlauben. She was the eldest daughter of Agnes of Milly and Joscelin III, Count of Edessa, who sold Chastel Neuf and Toron to the Teutonic order. She was named after Joscelin’s mother.

Beatrix married firstly William of Valence. By 1208 Beatrix married Otto whom she bore sons Otto and Henry.

In 1220 Beatrix de Courtenay and her husband sold their land in Galilee, including "one third of the fief of St. George", and "one third of the village of Bokehel", to the Teutonic Knights.

Otto and Beatrix founded the Cistercian cloister of Frauenroth in 1231, where both are buried.

== Sources ==
- Bumke, Joachim (1991). Courtly Culture: Literature and Society in the High Middle Ages. Translated by Dunlap, Thomas. University of California Press.
- Frankel, Rafael (1988). "Topographical notes on the territory of Acre in the Crusader period". Israel Exploration Journal. 38 (4): 249–272.
- Mayer, H.E. (1980). "Die Seigneurie de Joscelin und der Deutsche Orden". In Fleckenstein, Josef; Hellmann, Manfred (eds.). Die geistlichen Ritterorden Europas. Vorträge und Forschungen. Vol. 26. B.R.D.
- Pringle, D. (1998). The Churches of the Crusader Kingdom of Jerusalem: A Corpus. Vol. 2, L–Z. Cambridge University Press.
- Röhricht, R. (1893). (RRH) Regesta regni Hierosolymitani (MXCVII-MCCXCI) (in Latin). Berlin: Libraria Academica Wageriana.
- Strehlke, E., ed. (1869). Tabulae Ordinis Theutonici ex tabularii regii Berolinensis codice potissimum. Berlin: Weidmanns.
