= Fürstenberg (Baar) =

Coordinates: 47°53′N 8°34′E

Highest point
- Elevation: 918.2 m (3,012 ft)

Geography
- Location: Baden-Württemberg, Germany

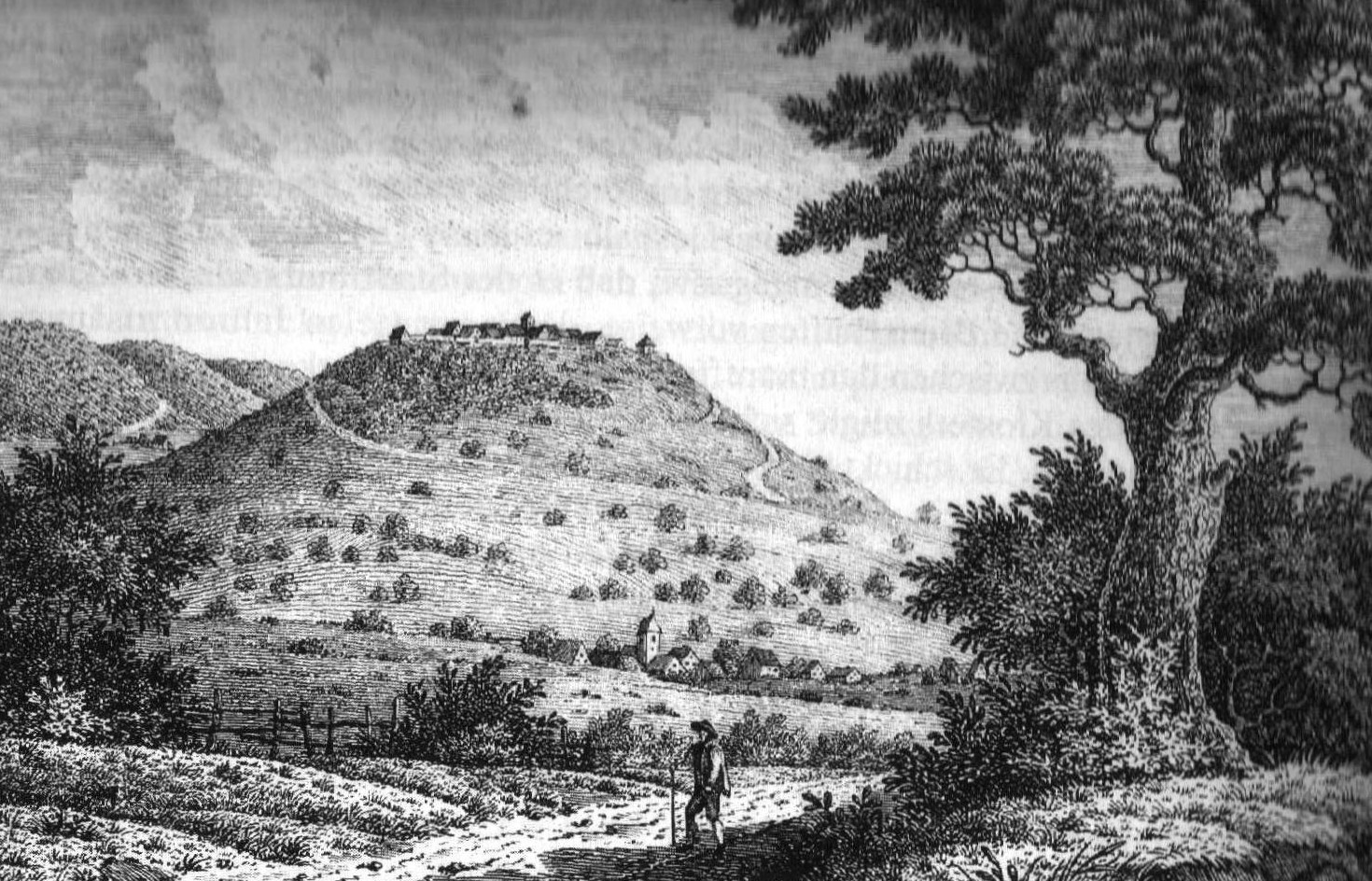
Fürstenberg at the beginning of the 19th century

Fürstenberg (Baar) is a mountain of Baden-Württemberg, Germany.
