= Furstenberg's rosette =

Structure in the teat of cattle, sheep and other ruminants

The Furstenberg's rosette is a structure in the teat of cattle, sheep and other ruminants, located at the internal end of the teat canal (also known as the streak canal or teat duct) at the junction with the teat cistern. It often is considered a barrier for pathogens, yet it offers little resistance to milk leaving the teat.

The rosette consists of 6–10 connective tissue folds covered with an epithelium which is two cells thick.

It has a leukocyte population, mainly consisting of plasma cells and lymphocytes; leukocytes are thought to leave the teat wall and enter the cistern via Furstenberg's rosette. It contains bactericidal cationic proteins (e.g. ubiquitin); some researchers consider these might be secreted by the rosette tissue.
