= Dolores Guinness =

German socialite (1936–2012)

- Born: Dolores Maria Agatha Wilhelmine Luise Freiin von Fürstenberg-Herdringen; 31 July 1936; Berlin, Germany
- Died: 20 January 2012 (aged 75); Lausanne, Switzerland
- Spouse: Patrick Benjamin Guinness (m. 1955; died 1965)
- Children: 3
- Parent(s): Franz-Egon von Fürstenberg-Herdringen; Gloria Rubio y Alatorre

Dolores Guinness (née Baroness Dolores Maria Agatha Wilhelmine Luise von Fürstenberg-Herdringen; 31 July 1936 – 20 January 2012) was a German-born aristocrat, socialite, fashion icon, and jet set member of the 1950s and 1960s. She was a member of the International Best Dressed List from 1970. Her mother was the Mexican-born socialite Gloria Guinness.

== Early life ==
She was born on 31 July 1936 in Berlin-Charlottenburg. She was the only daughter of Franz-Egon Maria Meinhard Engelbert Pius Aloysius Kaspar Ferdinand Dietrich, 3rd Graf von Fürstenberg-Herdringen (1896–1975) and his second wife, Gloria Guinness (née Rubio y Alatorre) (1912–1980). She also has a younger brother, Franz-Egon (born 1939), and a half-sister, Betsy von Furstenberg, from her father's previous marriage.

Though some published sources have described Dolores von Fürstenberg as a countess and a princess, she would have been, in fact, a Freiin (baroness), according to the last published issue of the Almanach de Gotha - had these titles not been abolished in 1919.

== Later life ==
At age 19, she married her stepbrother Patrick Benjamin Guinness (1931–1965), son of Loel Guinness and Joan Yarde-Buller, on 22 October 1955 in Paris. Patrick was killed in a car accident in Turtig near Raron, Switzerland 1965. Their children were:

1. Maria Alexandra Guinness Cook (born 1956) married Foulques, Count de Quatrebarbes (born 1948) in 1979. Now divorced. Have issue.
2. Loel Patrick Guinness (born 1957)
3. Victoria Christina Niarchos (born 1960) married Philip Niarchos in 1984, son of late Greek billionaire Stavros Niarchos. Have issue.

After Patrick's death, Dolores fell madly in love with the Aga Khan, the son of Joan Barbara Yarde-Buller (1908–1997) by her marriage to Aly Khan (1911–1960), and so her late husband's half-brother, and wanted to marry him, but nothing came of that.

== Fashion icon ==
Dolores was often seen in Vogue, Harper's Bazaar, Town and Country and Life magazine dressed in designer clothes from Givenchy, Christian Dior, Yves Saint Laurent and Balenciaga during the 1950s and 1960s, photographed by Cecil Beaton, Bert Stern, Henry Clarke, Mark Shaw (photographer), Richard Avedon and William Klein. She often appeared on the International Best Dressed List during these years.
