= Otto von Botenlauben =

Otto I von Botenlauben
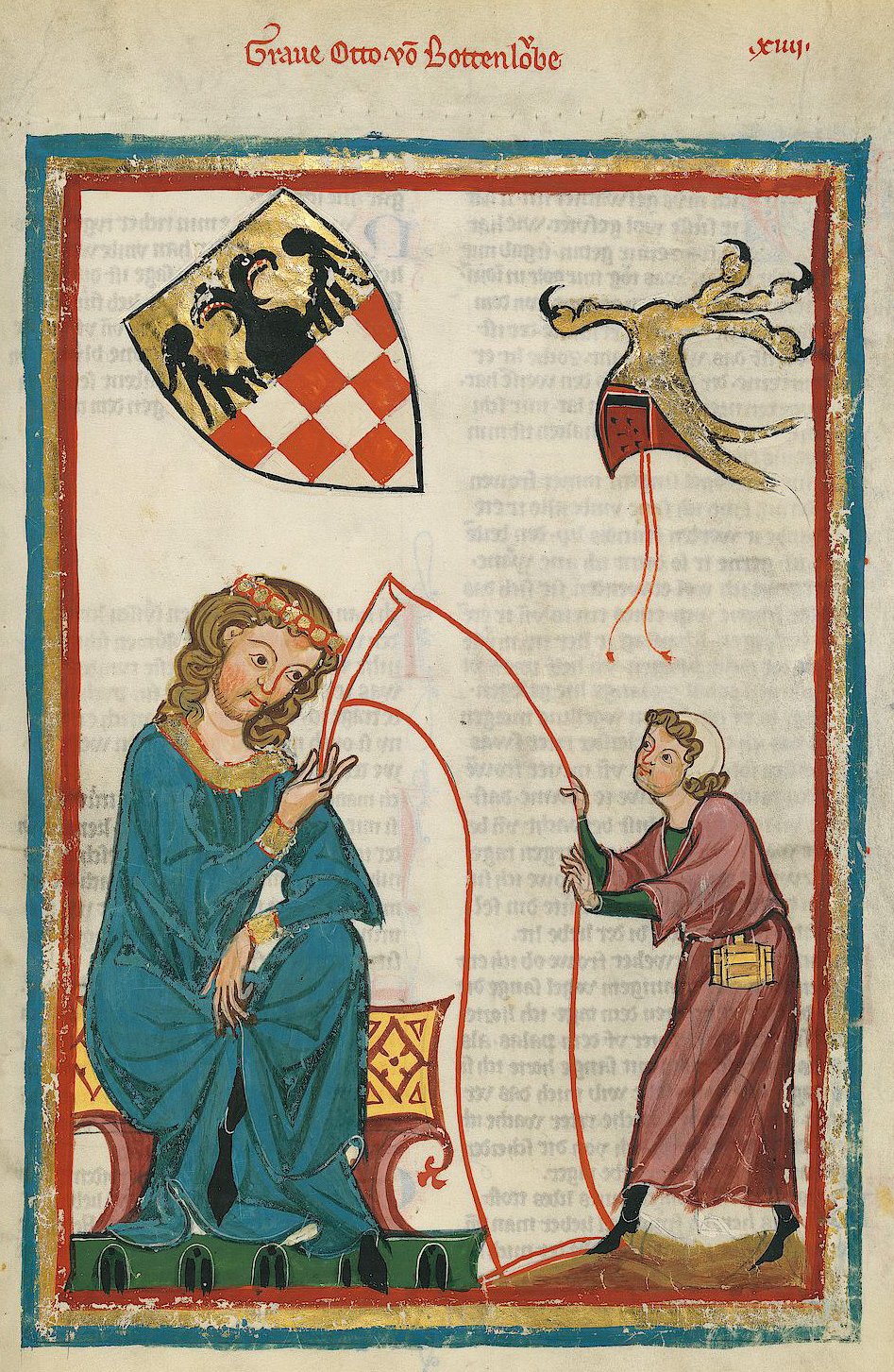
- Count Otto, in the Codex Manesse
- Born: 1177; Henneberg
- Died: 1245 (aged 67–68); Bad Kissingen
- Noble family: House of Henneberg
- Spouse: Beatrix de Courtenay
- Issue: Otto II Graf von Henneberg-Botenlauben-Hildenburg, Henry, Albert
- Father: Poppo VI von Henneberg
- Mother: Sophie, Gräfin von Andechs

Otto von Botenlauben or Botenlouben (1177, Henneberg – before 1245, near Bad Kissingen), the Count of Henneberg from 1206, was a German minnesinger, Crusader and monastic founder.

Otto von Botenlauben was the fourth son of Count Poppo VI von Henneberg and his wife Sophia, countess of Andechs and margravine of Istria. In the oldest records (from 1196 and 1197), he still called himself Count von Henneberg. In 1206, he pronounced himself Count von Botenlauben, after Botenlauben Castle near Bad Kissingen, the ruins of which remain to this day.

Otto’s existence is first recorded at the court of Emperor Henry VI in 1197, when he took part in the Emperors' campaign to Italy. After that, Otto travelled to the Holy Land and made a career in the kingdom of Jerusalem, where he gained good standing, prosperity and married Beatrix de Courtenay, the daughter of the royal seneschal Joscelin III of Edessa, in 1205. In 1220, he sold his hereditary lands (iure uxoris), the seigneurie de Joscelin, to the Teutonic Knights and returned to Germany, where he would attend the royal court often in the years that followed. His sons, Otto and Henry, as well as his grandson Albert, joined the clergy and so Otto’s line ended without an heir.

Otto and his wife founded the Cistercian cloister of Frauenroth in 1231, where both are buried. The cloister was destroyed in the Thirty Years' War, but their headstone remains to this day.

Otto was one of the minnesingers collated in the Codex Manesse. His works are limited: twelve love songs have survived and one Leich. A few strophes are collected in the Weingarten Manuscript and the Kleine Heidelberger Liederhandschrift, the latter under the name of Niune.

== Sources ==
- Pringle, Denys (1998). The Churches of the Crusader Kingdom of Jerusalem: A Corpus: L-Z (excluding Tyre). Vol. II. Cambridge University Press. ISBN 0-521-39037-0.
