= Fürstenberg Castle (Höingen) =

- Burg Fürstenberg, kurkölnische Landesburg
- Ense-Höingen

Site information
- Type: hill castle
- Code: DE-NW
- Condition: ruin

Location
- Coordinates: 51°28′21″N 7°56′31″E

Site history
- Built: before 1295

Garrison information
- Occupants: Castellans

Fürstenberg Castle (German: Burg Fürstenberg), also called the Electoral Cologne State Castle (kurkölnische Landesburg), is a ruined castle near the former site of the village Höingen, in the municipality of Ense, Soest in the German state of North Rhine-Westphalia. Built on a high point above the Ruhr as a castle for the Archbishop of Cologne, who was among the prince electors of the Holy Roman Empire, the site was called the Prince's Hill (Fürstenberg), lending its name to the House of Fürstenberg (Westphalia) that started with the Imperial Knight Hermann, the Lehnsmann who held the castle for the prince when it was first built, c. 1295.

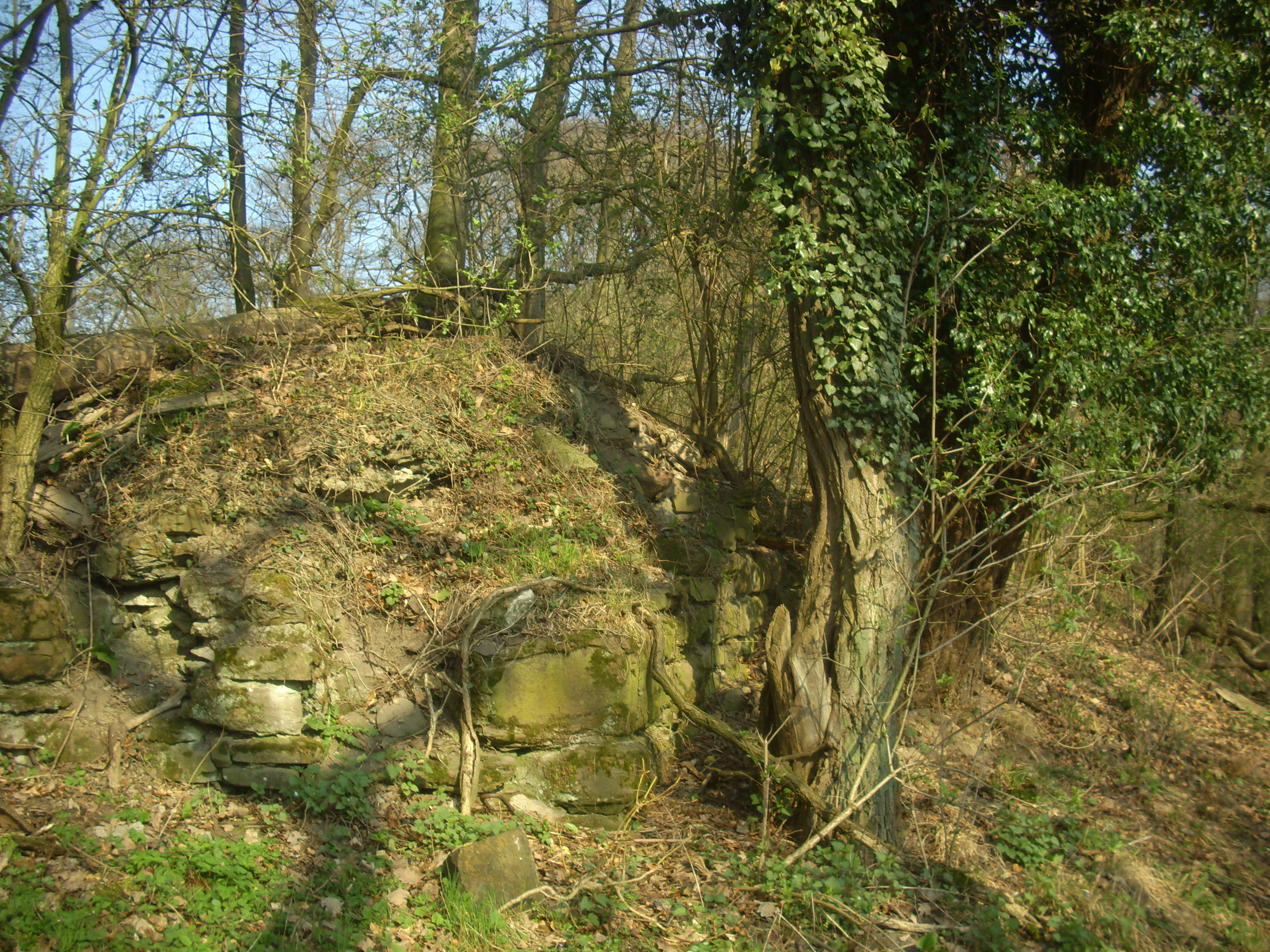
Wall remains on the Richters Köpfchen

== Location ==
The ruins of this hill castle lie on the hill of Fürstenberg above the site of the former village of Höingen and the Ruhr. It was part of the Duchy of Westphalia and was in a position of strategic importance on the border with the County of Arnsberg. The inner bailey was on an eminence known as Richters Köpfchen, the outer bailey further away on the site of the present Chapel on the Fürstenberg.

== History ==
The castle is first mentioned in 1295. At that time its first castellan (Burgmann), Hermann of Fürstenberg is cited, the first record of the now flourishing family of the barons of Fürstenberg. This Herman came from the family of Binolen (Hönnetal), but later named itself after their administrative seat of Fürstenberg.

The castle was involved in numerous military actions:

- 1303/04 - destruction by Count Everd of the Mark in his feud against Archbishop Wigbold,
- 1307/09 - Archbishop Henry rebuilt the castle. On 8 December 1309 he was in the castle and signed two documents,
- 1311 - Count Engelbert II of the Mark destroyed the castle,
- 1313 - Bishop Henry rebuilt the castle,
- 1343/44 - the castle was finally destroyed by the counts of Arnsberg and of the Mark.

Members of the family of Fürstenberg lived at that time as castellans in Werl and around 1365/70 built Waterlappe Castle, which became their family seat in 1633. When in 1368 the County of Arnsberg was transferred to the Electors of Cologne, the border castle on the Fürstenberg hill lost its significance. The town of Neheim, now in Cologne, took over the defensive function in this area against the counts of the Mark.

== Site ==
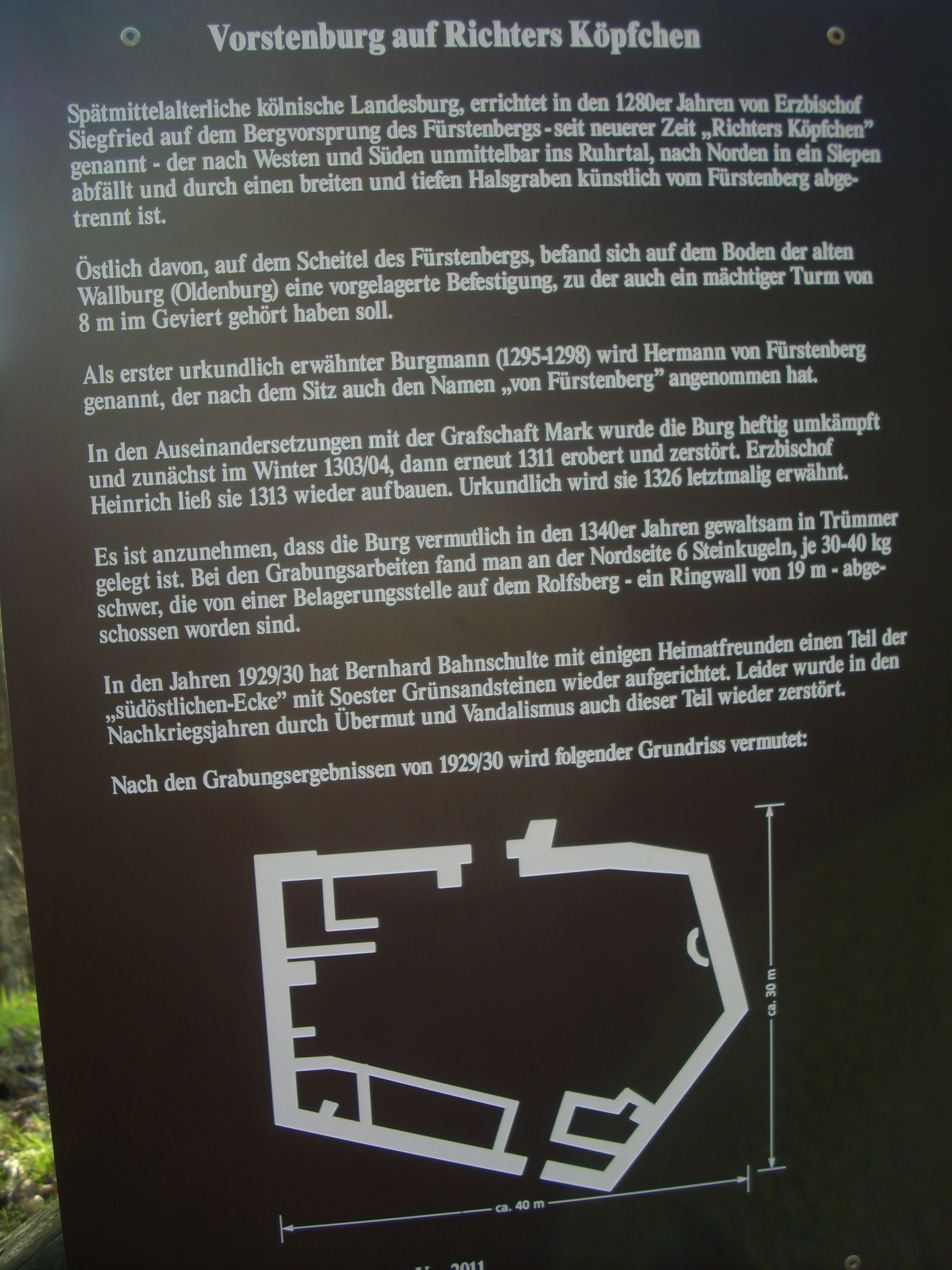
Information board on the Richters Köpfchen

Even today the ring-shaped, medieval ramparts of the castle may be seen in the woods on the Fürstenberg. They are a protected site.

Two fortifications may be distinguished:

a) Oldenburg, a large rampart system in which the castle chapel is located,
b) Richters Köpfchen, lower down, a small medieval stone castle.

Individual remains of the stone castle on "Richters Köpfchen" may still be seen. The Chapel on the Fürstenberg, on the tip of the hill, has been recorded since 1429.

== Literature ==
- Jens Friedhoff: Sauerland und Siegerland. Theiss Burgenführer. Published by Joachim Zeune. Theiss, Stuttgart, 2002, ISBN 3-8062-1706-8, pp. 70–71.
- Michael Jolk und Günter Bertzen: Der Fürstenberg. Kapelle, Badehaus, Vegetation und Heilkräuter. Westfälische Kunststätten, Issue 92. Selbstverlag, Münster, 2002
