= Frauenroth Abbey =

Coordinates: 50°15′41″N 10°01′07″E

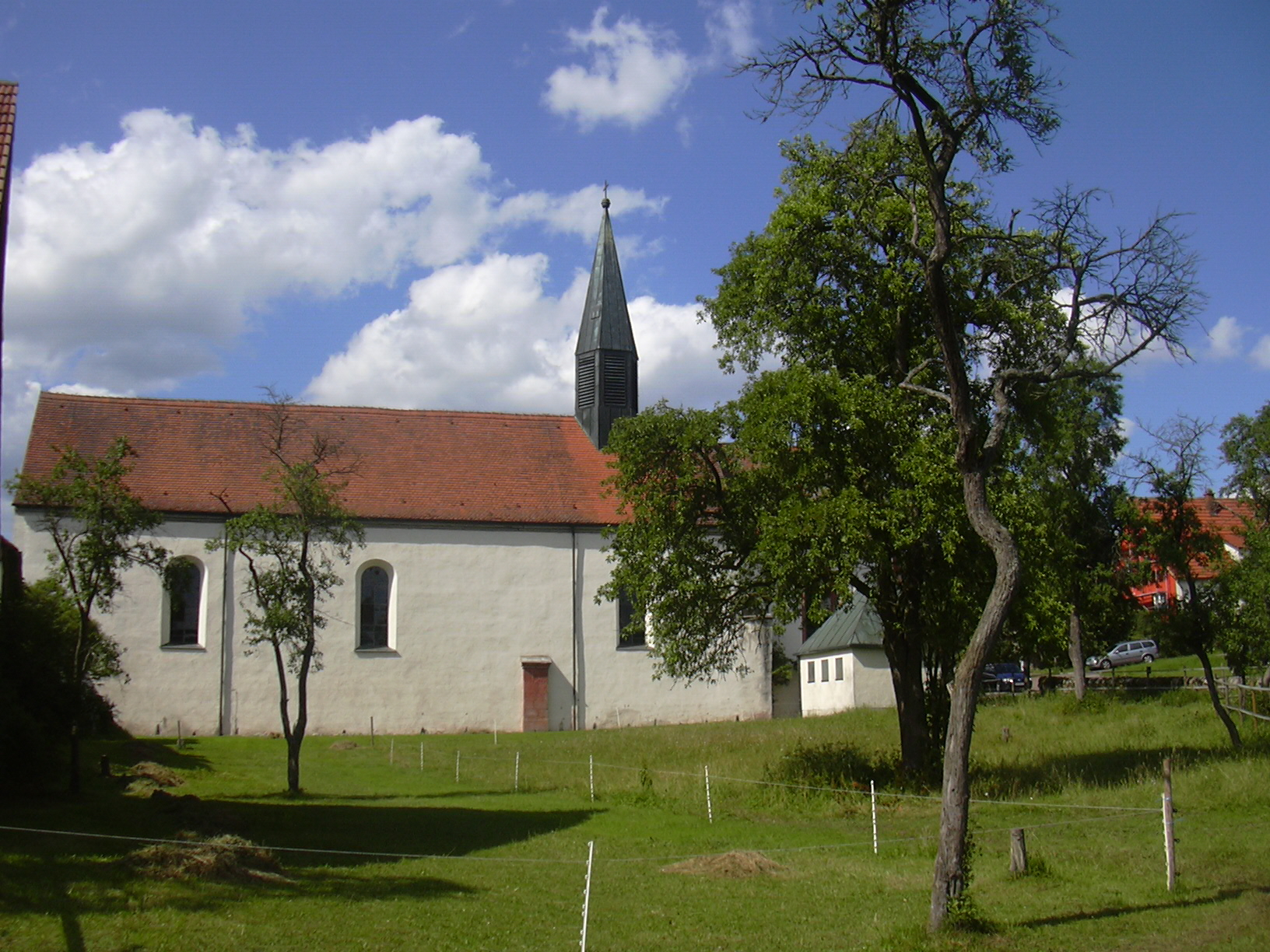
Photograph of the abbey

Frauenroth Abbey is a former Cistercian nunnery in Burkardroth in Bavaria, South Germany, in the bishopric of Würzburg

The abbey, dedicated to Saint George and All Saints, was built in 1231 by Count Otto von Botenlauben and Beatrix de Courtenay, who were both later buried here. (Note: The foundation legend is that Beatrix's veil was blown away while she and her husband were walking around Bodenlaube Castle, and she promised to build a monastery wherever it landed.) Following their deaths, their son, also called Otto, became head of the abbey.

The abbey ceased was dissolved in 1574, and was taken over by the administrative office of the Prince-Bishop of Würzburg. In 1691, the remains were sold to eight farmers in Burkardroth, who used them to build the village of Frauenroth. The former monastic chapel still stands and is used as a church.

== Sources ==
- Bumke, Joachim (1991). Courtly Culture: Literature and Society in the High Middle Ages. Translated by Dunlap, Thomas. University of California Press. ISBN 9780520066342.
