= Ense =

- Municipality
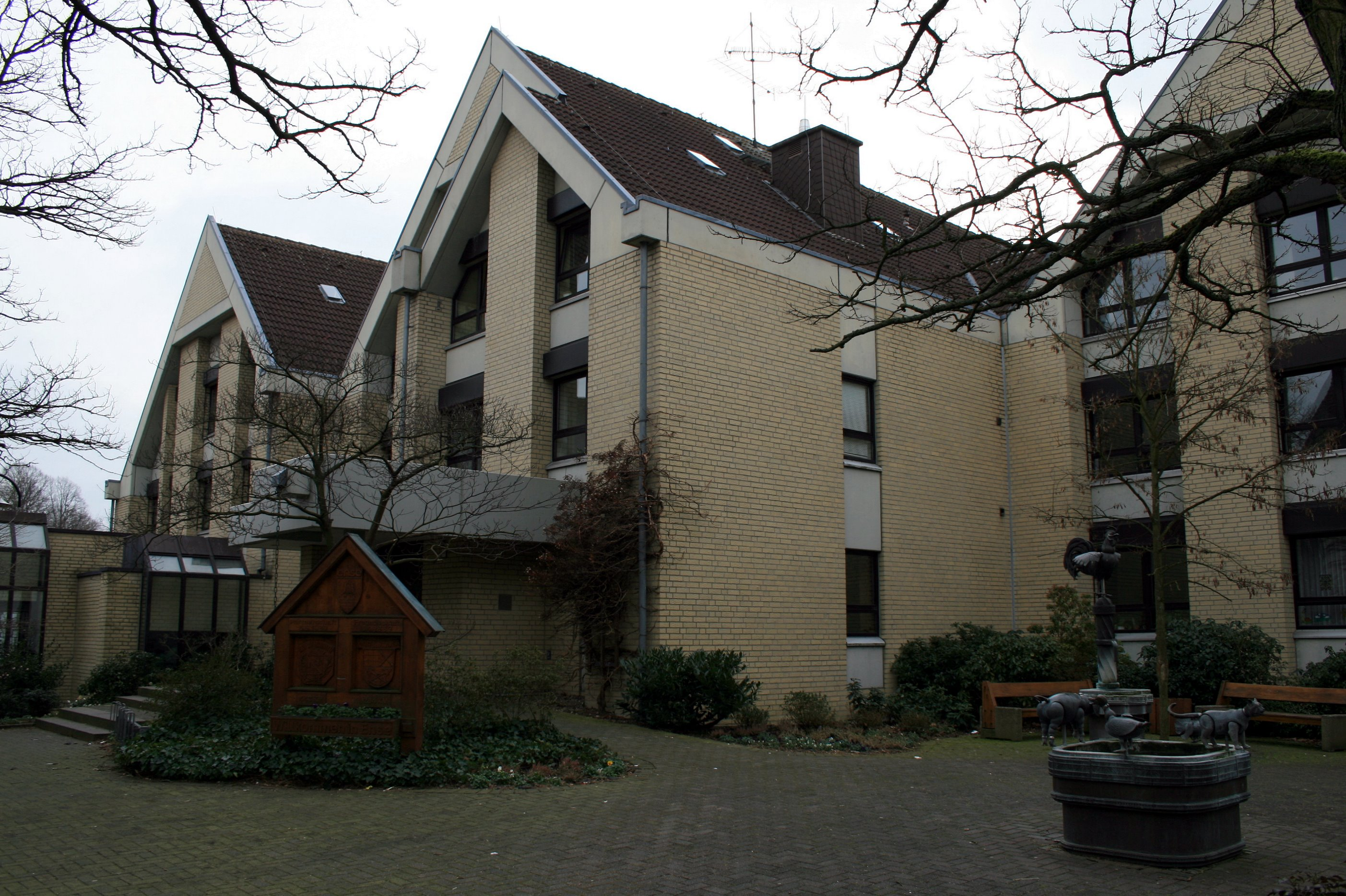
- Townhall of Ense (in the town of Bremen (Ense))

- Coat of arms

- Location of Ense within Soest district
- Interactive map of Ense
- Location within Germany Location within North Rhine-Westphalia
- Coordinates: 51°28′N 07°58′E
- Country: Germany
- State: North Rhine-Westphalia
- Admin. region: Arnsberg
- District: Soest
- Subdivisions: 15

Government
  - Mayor (2020–25): Rainer Busemann

Area
  - Total: 51.08 km^{2} (19.72 sq mi)
- Elevation: 206 m (676 ft)

Population (2025-12-31)
  - Total: 12,303
  - Density: 240.9/km^{2} (623.8/sq mi)
- Time zone: UTC+01:00 (CET)
  - Summer (DST): UTC+02:00 (CEST)
- Postal codes: 59469
- Dialling codes: 02938
- Vehicle registration: SO
- Website: www.gemeinde-ense.de

Ense (German pronunciation: [ˈɛnzə]) is a municipality in the district of Soest, in North Rhine-Westphalia, Germany.

== Geography ==
Ense is situated on the river Möhne, approx. 12 km north-west of Arnsberg and 12 km south-west of Soest. Ense lies at the north side of the Sauerland and at the south side of the Haarstrang.

=== Neighbouring municipalities ===
- Arnsberg
- Möhnesee
- Soest
- Werl
- Wickede

=== Division of the town ===
Ense consists of the following 15 districts:

- Bilme (47 inhabitants)
- Bittingen (99 inhabitants)
- Bremen (Ense) (3.135 inhabitants)
- Gerlingen (66 inhabitants)
- Höingen (1.964 inhabitants)
- Hünningen (523 inhabitants)
- Lüttringen (990 inhabitants)
- Niederense (3.366 inhabitants)
- Oberense (276 inhabitants)
- Parsit (933 inhabitants)
- Ruhne (325 inhabitants)
- Sieveringen (352 inhabitants)
- Vierhausen
- Volbringen (137 inhabitants)
- Waltringen (671 inhabitants)

=== Twin towns ===
- Éleu-dit-Leauwette (France) -- since 1989
- Burkardroth (Germany)

== Population ==
Historical population

Year	Pop.	±% p.a.
1965	6,720	—
1970	7,531	+2.30%
1975	8,436	+2.30%
1980	9,242	+1.84%
1985	9,603	+0.77%
1990	10,040	+0.89%
1995	10,869	+1.60%

Year	Pop.	±% p.a.
2000	12,189	+2.32%
2005	12,793	+0.97%
2010	12,656	−0.22%
2015	12,442	−0.34%
2020	12,256	−0.30%
2025	12,303	+0.08%

Source: Landesdatabank Nordrhein-Westfalen
