= Betsy von Furstenberg =

German-American actress (1931–2015)

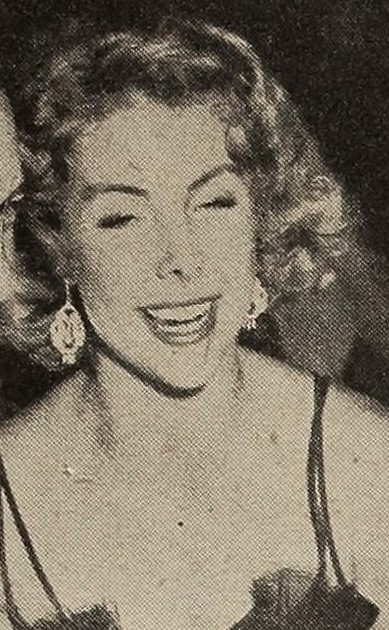
- Born: Elizabeth Caroline Maria Agatha Felicitas Therese, Gräfin von Fürstenberg-Herdringen; August 16, 1931; Arnsberg, Germany
- Died: April 21, 2015 (aged 83); New York City, U.S.
- Occupation: Actress
- Years active: 1950–1984
- Spouses: Guy Vincent (m. 1954; div. 1966) John J. Reynolds (m. 1984; died 1994)
- Children: 2
- Relatives: Dolores Guinness (half-sister); Gloria Rubio (step-mother)

Elizabeth Caroline Maria Agatha Felicitas Therese, Gräfin von Fürstenberg-Herdringen (August 16, 1931 – April 21, 2015), known as Betsy von Furstenberg, was a German-born American actress who starred in several Broadway plays, films and television series between 1950 and the early 1980s.

In 1988, she published Mirror, Mirror, a novel centered on an heiress pursuing love among Europe's elite social circles.

== Early life ==
Elizabeth Caroline Maria Agatha Felicitas Therese, Gräfin von Fürstenberg-Herdringen was born in Arnsberg, Germany. Her parents were Franz-Egon, Graf (Count) von Fürstenberg-Herdringen (1896–1975) and his first wife, Elizabeth Foster Johnson (1899–1961), a native of Memphis, Tennessee. Her stepmothers were Gloria Rubio, Clara Ghyczy and Joan Siegel (not to be confused with Joanne Siegel). She had two half-siblings from her father's marriage to Gloria Rubio: Franz-Egon, Freiherr von Fürstenberg-Herdringen (b. 1939), and Dolores Maria Agatha Wilhelmine Luise Freiin von Fürstenberg-Herdringen (1936–2012), who married Patrick Guinness.

Von Furstenberg left Germany with her parents for New York. She was tutored in dance from the age of four years and by age seven she was already performing with the American Ballet Theatre. When she was 14, she began working as a fashion model. Von Furstenberg received her early formal education at private schools in New York City, attending the Gardner School there and later graduating from the Hewitt School.

== Career ==
=== Stage ===
Von Furstenberg, who studied acting in New York at the Neighborhood Playhouse under the renowned teacher Sanford Meisner, performed in a wide range of productions on Broadway for 25 years. She debuted there in 1951 in Philip Barry's Second Threshold, a performance that resulted in her being featured on the cover of Life magazine and being publicized as "the most promising young actress of the year". She went on to star or co-star in Oh, Men! Oh, Women! (1953); The Chalk Garden (1956); Child of Fortune (1956); Nature's Way (1957); The Making of Moo (1958); Say, Darling (1959); Mary, Mary (1961); Step on a Crack (1962); The Frog Pond (1965); The Paisley Convertible (1967); Avanti! (1968); The Gingerbread Lady (1970) and Does Anybody Here Do the Peabody? (1976). In the summer of 1969 Von Furstenberg appeared at the historic Elitch Theatre in Lonnie Coleman's A Place for Polly.

=== Television ===
On American television, von Furstenberg appeared in more than two dozen weekly series and made-for-TV movies between 1951 and 1980. In 1958 she memorably starred opposite Robert Horton on the anthology series Alfred Hitchcock Presents, portraying a double-crossing young widow in "The Disappearing Trick", an episode directed by Arthur Hiller. Earlier that same year, she also appeared in the Have Gun – Will Travel episode "Girl from Piccadilly". Much later, in 1983, von Furstenberg was cast in the role of Lisa Grimaldi on the popular soap opera As the World Turns, a part she played for a year as a replacement for actress Eileen Fulton, who had left the daytime drama reportedly due to illness. As the World Turns was not the only soap opera in which von Furstenberg appeared. She was also cast in the role of Niele Neeves on The Secret Storm and as "The Duchess of Essex" in Another World.

== Personal life and death ==
Betsey von Furstenberg was first engaged to Peter Stewart Howard, son of Lindsay C. Howard and stepson of George Washington Vanderbilt III. They announced their engagement on the Stork Club TV show in November 1950, but ended the engagement in 1951.

In September 1951, von Furstenberg announced her engagement to Hilton hotel heir Conrad "Nicky" Hilton Jr., whose divorce from actress Elizabeth Taylor was finalized earlier that year in January. She did not, however, marry Hilton; instead, on June 16, 1954, she married Guy Vincent Chastenet de la Maisonneuve, a French-born mining engineer, who simplified and changed his name to Guy Vincent. Before their divorce in 1966, the couple had two children, a daughter and a son:

- Gay Caroline Vincent, who married William Farish Gerry (b. 1955), the son of Martha F. Gerry (1918–2007) and a grandson of William Stamps Farish II (1881–1942), the president of Standard Oil from 1937 to 1942, in 1988.
- Glyn Douglas Vincent, who married Anastasia Cole Goodman, a leading authority on pre-Columbian art and the daughter of Dr. and Mrs. Edmund N. Goodman in 1989.

The combination of being an actor and a parent proved to be frustrating at times for von Furstenberg, who believed that the two roles sometimes blended together in daily life and posed special challenges both in and outside the home. In 1972, six years after her divorce from Guy Vincent, she expressed her views on the subject in a personal essay titled "Actors Are Not the Only Ones Who Act", which was published in The New York Times on September 24, 1972. In one portion of her essay she shares the following:

...I have gotten my way by 'acting' in some very significant moments in my life when perhaps in the long run it would have been better if I hadn't gotten my way...One of the most frustrating drawbacks of being an actor‐parent is to have your children accuse you of acting when you're being perfectly sincere. Of course, they've seen you being 'perfectly sincere' on stage so for the poor things I guess the better you are the more confusing it is for them (and how do you explain that both are real and yet not the same?). Ultimately your actions must bear out the truth of what you say to them.

After a prolonged period of being single, von Furstenberg married for the second time in 1984, then to New York real estate broker John J. Reynolds. They remained together until his death in 1994.

== Death ==
On April 21, 2015, von Furstenberg died at her home in Manhattan at the age of 83 from complications attributed to Alzheimer's disease.

== Selected filmography ==
Year	Title	Role	Notes
1950	Women Without Names	Boshe, the Girl from Munich	
1958	Alfred Hitchcock Presents	Laura Gild	Season 3 Episode 27: "Disappearing Trick"
1959	Alfred Hitchcock Presents	Thelma Thurgood	Season 4 Episode 20: "The Diamond Necklace"
1959	One Step Beyond	Helga	episode "Reunion"
1970	Loving	Grace's Aunt	Uncredited
