= Grenier =

Grenier is a surname. It is a French word for "attic," "loft," or "granary". It may refer to:

== People ==
=== Middle Ages ===
Various members of the House of Grenier:

- Balian Grenier (1190s–1241), Count of Sidon
- Eustace Grenier (c. 1070–1123), Flemish crusader
- Gerard Grenier (died between 1165 and 1171), a nobleman from the Kingdom of Jerusalem, eldest son of Eustace
- Guy Grenier (fl. 1174–76), Lord of Caesarea, son of Hugh
- Hugh Grenier (died between 1168 and 1174), Lord of Caesarea, son of Walter I
- Julian Grenier (died 1275), Count of Sidon, son of Balian
- Juliana Grenier (died between 1213 and 1216), Lady of Caesarea, sister of Walter II
- Reginald of Sidon or Reginald Grenier (1130s–1202), Lord of Sidon, son of Gerard
- Walter I Grenier (c. 1113–early 1150s), Lord of Caesarea, twin brother of Gerald
- Walter II Grenier (died between 1189 and 1191), Lord of Caesarea, son of Hugh Grenier
- Walter III of Caesarea or Walter Grenier ((before 1180–1229), Constable of the Kingdom of Cyprus and Lord of Caesarea

=== Modern world ===
- Adrian Grenier (born 1976), American actor
- Albert Grenier (1939–2026), Canadian pianist and academic
- Albert Grenier (historian) (1878–1961), French historian, theologian, and archaeologist
- Alexandre Grenier (born 1991), Canadian ice hockey player
- Angèle Grenier, Canadian maple syrup producer
- Auguste Jean François Grenier (1814–1890), French doctor and entomologist
- Cadyn Grenier (born 1996), American former baseball player
- Clément Grenier (born 1991), French footballer
- Dominique Grenier (born 1928), Canadian politician, mayor of Shawinigan
- Emmanuel Grenier (born 1970), French mathematician
- Fernand Grenier (Canadian politician) (1927–1988)
- Fernand Grenier (French politician) (1901–1992)
- Henri Grenier (1899–1980), Canadian priest, theologian and philosopher
- Hugo Grenier (born 1996), French tennis player
- Jacques de Grenier (1736–1803), French Navy officer
- Jean Grenier (1898–1971), French philosopher and writer
- Jean Charles Marie Grenier (1808–1875), French botanist and naturalist
- Jim Grenier, American politician
- John Grenier (1930–2007), American politician and lawyer
- Joseph Richard Grenier (1852–1926), barrister and a Puisne Judge of the Supreme Court of Ceylon
- Joshua Grenier (born 1979), American former soccer player
- Katia Grenier, French microwave and microfluidics engineer
- Marie-Louise Grenier (1845–1925), stage name Nouma-Hawa, French circus lion tamer
- Lucien Grenier (ice hockey) (born 1946), Canadian National Hockey League player
- Lucien Grenier (politician) (1925–1998), Canadian lawyer and politician
- Martin Grenier (born 1980), Canadian former professional ice hockey player
- Mikaël Grenier, Canadian racing driver
- Pasquier Grenier (fl. 1447–1493), tapestry and wine merchant from the Burgundian South Netherlands
- Paul Grenier (1768–1827), French general under Napoleon and later politician
- Philippe Grenier (1865–1944), French politician who converted to Islam, first Muslim member of the French Parliament
- Richard Grenier (ice hockey) (born 1952), Canadian ice hockey player
- Richard Grenier (newspaper columnist) (1926–2002), American columnist and film critic
- Robert Grenier (CIA officer), retired Central Intelligence Agency officer, director of the Counterterrorism Center (2004–2006)
- Robert Grenier (poet) (born 1941), American poet
- Roger Grenier (1919–2017), French writer and journalist
- Stéphane Grenier (soldier), Canadian-French officer
- Stéphane Grenier (tennis) (born 1968), French former tennis player
- Sylvain Grenier (born 1977), Canadian semi-retired professional wrestler
- Vincent Grenier (1948–2023), Canadian avant-garde filmmaker
- Zach Grenier (fl. 1986–present), American actor

== Fictional characters ==
- Louis Grenier, in William Faulkner novels and stories

== See also ==
- Suzanne Blais-Grenier
