= Emma of Jericho =

Frankish noblewoman, fl. 1116–1133

Emma of Jericho (fl. 1116–1133) was a Frankish noblewoman from the Kingdom of Jerusalem. Her uncle, Arnulf of Chocques, Latin patriarch of Jerusalem, gave her Jericho as dower when she married the powerful lord of Sidon and Caesarea, Eustace I Grenier. After Eustace's death in 1123, Emma administered Sidon and Caesarea on behalf of their sons, Eustace II and Walter I Grenier. In 1123 or 1124, she married Count Hugh II of Jaffa. The countess of Jaffa fades from history after 1133; the following year her son Walter accused her husband Hugh of treason, leading to King Fulk confiscating both Hugh's land and hers.

== Background ==
According to William of Tyre, Emma was the niece of the Latin patriarch of Jerusalem, Arnulf of Chocques. Arnulf was alleged to be lecherous and accused of having fathered a child with one of his mistresses. The historian Harry W. Hazard notes that, "in view of Arnulf's notorious lechery", "niece" may be a euphemism for daughter, but his colleague Bernard Hamilton argues that there is no evidence that Arnulf fathered Emma. William calls her Emelota, his continuator Aliennor or Ameloz, and the Lignages d'Outremer Hermeline or Ameline; in documents she is called Emma.

== Lady of Sidon and Caesarea ==
Arnulf arranged for Emma to marry the first lord of Caesarea and Sidon, Eustace I Grenier, who was one of the most powerful nobles in the kingdom. William narrates that Arnulf dowered Emma with the town and oasis of Jericho, which had belonged to the Church of the Holy Sepulchre. The historian Natasha Hodgson presumes that the arrangement had the blessing of King Baldwin II. This made Emma a wealthy woman, but Arnulf was scorned for alienating church property to the benefit of his family. The historian Hans Eberhard Mayer believes that this may explain why patriarchs took an oath to refrain from reducing the Church's property. Emma and Eustace had twin sons, Eustace II and Walter I Grenier. According to the Lignages (which, apparently erroneously, names Emma and Eustace's sons Gerard and Walter), Emma and Eustace also had a daughter, Agnes, who married Henry the Buffalo.

Hazard is skeptical about William's narrative: he argues that Arnulf could not have given Jericho to Emma before he became patriarch in 1112 and that if he did give it to her, she could not have married Eustace I before 1112 because her son Eustace II would have been too young to have an adult son, Gerard, by 1135. Mayer holds that Eustace II died childless and that Gerard was not related to the Greniers. While Hazard says that Jericho is never mentioned in the charters issued by Emma, Eustace I, or their descendants, Mayer cites two charters: one issued in 1116, when Emma and Eustace gave land, a mill, and water rights to the priests at Quarantana (near Jericho); and another, issued on 8 April 1124, when Emma increased the priests' water rights with the consent of her sons, who stood to inherit her land. Emma managed her lands and rights through a viscount of Jericho named Arnulf.

== Countess of Jaffa ==
Emma's first husband, Eustace, died on 15 June 1123. His lands were divided between their twins, with Eustace II receiving Sidon and Walter receiving Caesarea. By 8 April 1124, Emma had married Count Hugh II of Jaffa even though it was considered improper for a widow to remarry before a year had passed since her husband's death. At that point Hugh took charge of Jericho on behalf of Emma and her sons. Emma and the boys lived with Hugh in Jaffa. Although Eustace II had married and started acting as the lord of Sidon by 1126, he was still a minor and official business was conducted in Emma's presence and only with her assent.

Eustace II had died by 1131, but Walter, who reached the age of majority in 1128, did not receive Sidon. Mayer presumes that Sidon was retained by Hugh and concludes that Emma, who was still alive in 1133, could not help her son. In 1134, Walter stood up in court and accused Hugh of lèse-majesté and a conspiracy to murder King Fulk. Mayer concludes that this accusation, incited by the king, was Walter's attempt to secure Sidon for himself. Rumors also spread that Hugh was having an affair with Queen Melisende, Fulk's wife; Mayer suggests that the gossip was engineered by Fulk. In court, Walter challenged Hugh to a trial by combat. The count did not appear on the designated day, however, and was pronounced guilty by default. The historian Steven Runciman suggests that he might have been induced to stay away by Countess Emma, fearful of losing either husband or son. Hugh ended up exiled from the kingdom to Apulia, where he soon died.

Emma last appears alive in documents in 1133. It is not known whether she died before Hugh's banishment, followed him into exile, or remarried after his death; she may have also just faded from historical record. Emma's lands were confiscated along with Hugh's.

== Bibliography ==
- Hamilton, Bernard (2016). The Latin Church in the Crusader States: The Secular Church. Routledge. ISBN 9780860780724.
- Hazard, Harry W. (1975). "Caesarea and the Crusades". Bulletin of the American Schools of Oriental Research. Supplementary Studies. 1 (19 The Joint Expedition to Caesarea Maritima): 79–114. JSTOR 20066618.
- Hodgson, Natasha (2017). "Reputation, Authority and Masculine Identities in the Political Culture of the First Crusaders: The Career of Arnulf of Chocques". History. 102 (5 (353)). Wiley: 889–913. doi:10.1111/1468-229X.12522. ISSN 0018-2648. JSTOR 26624879.
- Mayer, Hans Eberhard (1972). "Studies in the History of Queen Melisende of Jerusalem". Dumbarton Oaks Papers. 26. Dumbarton Oaks: 93–182. doi:10.2307/1291317. JSTOR 1291317.
- Mayer, Hans Eberhard (1985). "The Origins of the County of Jaffa". Israel Exploration Journal. 35 (1). Israel Exploration Society: 35–45. ISSN 0021-2059. JSTOR 27925970.
- Mayer, Hans Eberhard (1990). "The Wheel of Fortune: Seignorial Vicissitudes under Kings Fulk and Baldwin III of Jerusalem". Speculum. 65 (4). University of Chicago Press: 860–877. doi:10.2307/2863565. ISSN 0038-7134. JSTOR 2863565.
- Runciman, Steven (1952). A History of the Crusades: The Kingdom of Jerusalem and the Frankish East, 1100–1187. Vol. 2. Cambridge University Press. ISBN 0241298768.
