= House of Grenier =

Granier or Grenier Family
- Country: Kingdom of Jerusalem
- Founded: 12th century
- Founder: Eustachius Granarius
- Titles: Lordship of Sidon; Lordship of Caesarea
- Dissolution: 1277–1289

The House of Granier (or Grenier) was a prominent noble family during the Crusades founded at the beginning of the 12th century by Eustachius Granarius, a Flemish nobleman from the Diocese of Thérouanne in the County of Saint-Pol (Note: Alan V. Murray in his book The Crusader Kingdom of Jerusalem: A Dynastic History 1099-1125 (2000) writes : "However, his origins can be established with a high degree of certainty. The Versus de viris illustribus diocesis Tarvanensis qui in sacra fuere expeditione identifies him as a Fleming from the diocese of Therouanne : Par belramensis, fit princeps Caesariensis / Eustachius notus miles, cognomine Gernirs. The form Gernirs is also used by William of Tyre, and seems to be a vernacular equivalent of the latin forms of Eustace’s surname which would seem to indicate an official in charge of a granarium (store-house), although as this appears to have become a hereditary surname carried on by his descendants it does not necessary reveal anything about Eustace himself. The phrase par belramensis can most satisfactorily be explained as the noun par in the sense of peer, a military office with an attached fief known in the county of Flanders from the mid-eleventh century, plus an adjective deriving from a toponym; since this must necessarily be sought in the diocese of Thérouanne it must refer to Beaurain-château (F, Pas-de-Calais, arr. Montreuil-sur-Mer) on the River Canche, which is mentioned in 723 as Belrinio super Qanchia sitas in pago Tarvaninse and in the eleventh and twelfth centuries as Belrem and castellum de Belrain. As Beaurain-Château was part of the county of Saint-Pol, held from the count of Boulogne, it is likely that Eustace was originally on crusade Count Hugh of Saint-Pol and his son Engelrand.") who became lord of Sidon and Caesarea near 1110.

== History ==
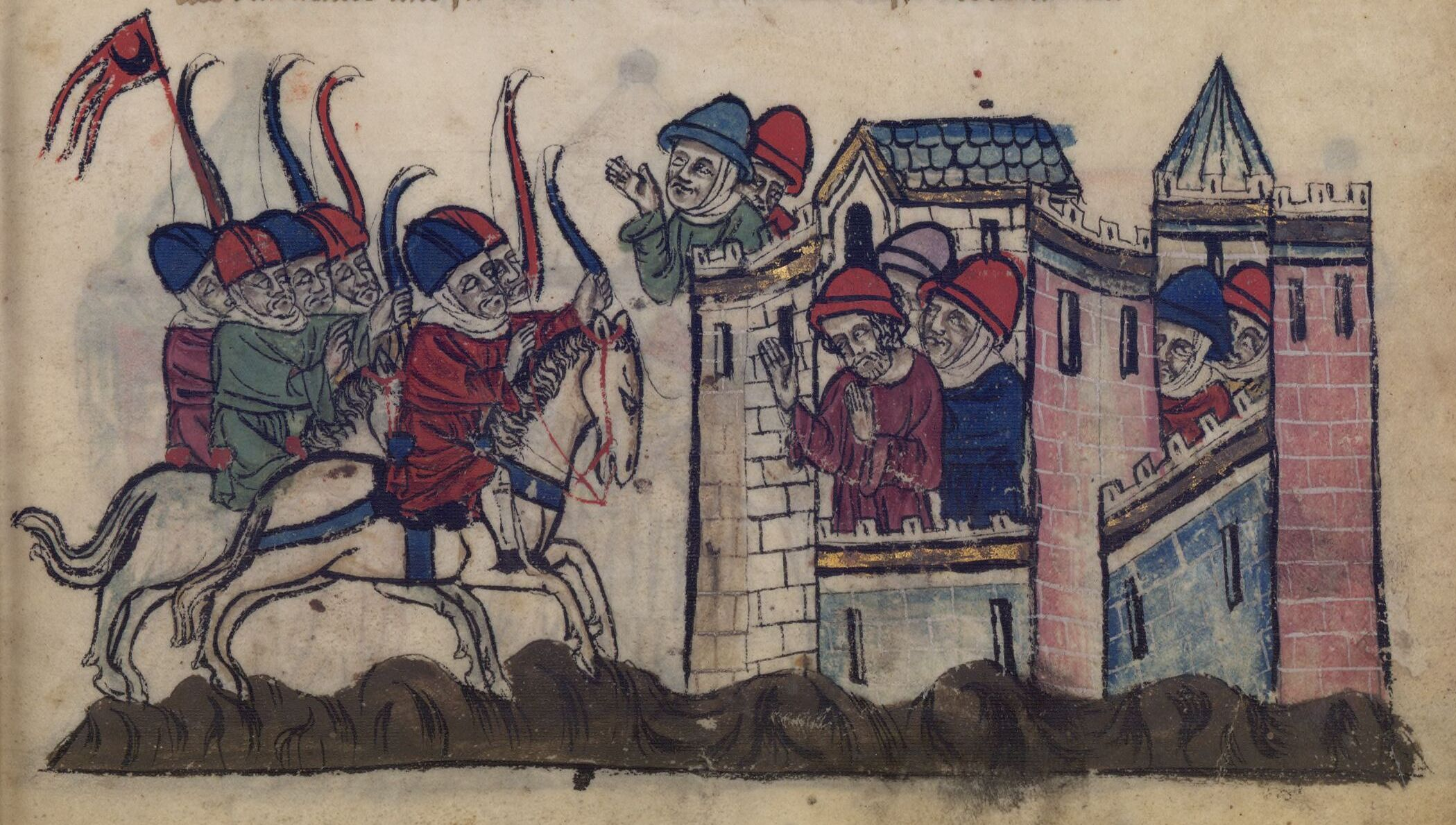
Siege of Sidon: Kitbuqa vs. Julian Grenier in 1260. From Hayton of Corycus, Fleur des histoires d'orient.

Sidon was captured in December 1110 and given to Eustace Grenier. The lordship was a coastal strip on the Mediterranean Sea between Tyre and Beirut. It was conquered by Saladin in 1187 and remained in Muslim hands until it was restored to Christian control by German Crusaders in the Crusade of 1197. Julian Grenier sold it to the Knights Templar after it was destroyed by the Mongols in 1260 after the Battle of Ain Jalut. One of the vassals of the lordship was the Lordship of the Shuf.

Caesarea was granted to Eustace Granier (or Grenier) in 1110. His descendants continued to rule Caesarea until it became the property of John Aleman by right of his marriage to Margaret Grenier in 1238 or 1243.

The Granier or Grenier family became extinct with two brothers: Balian II (who died at Botron in 1277) and John (who died in Armenia in 1289), sons of Julian Grenier (died in 1275) lord of Sidon and his wife Euphemia, daughter of Hethum I, King of Armenia.

== Lords of Sidon ==
- Eustace I Grenier (1110–1123)
- Gerard Grenier (1123–1171)
- Renaud Grenier (1171–1187, titular from then)
- Conquered by Saladin, 1187-1197
- Renaud Grenier (restored, 1197–1202)
- Balian I Grenier (1202–1239)
- Julian Grenier (1239–1260, titular from then)
- Sold to the Knights Templar (1260)

== Lords of Caesarea ==
- Eustace Grenier (1110–1123)
- Walter I Grenier (1123–1154)
- Hugh Grenier (1154–1169)
- Guy Grenier (c. 1170s)
- Walter II Grenier (c. 1180s–1189/91)
- Juliana Grenier (1189/93–1213/6)
  - Aymar de Lairon (1189/93–1213/6)
- Walter III (1213/6–1229)
- John (1229–1238/41)
- Margaret (1238/41–1255/77)
  - John Aleman (1238/43–1264/77)

== Castles of the Lordship of Sidon and Lordship of Caesarea ==
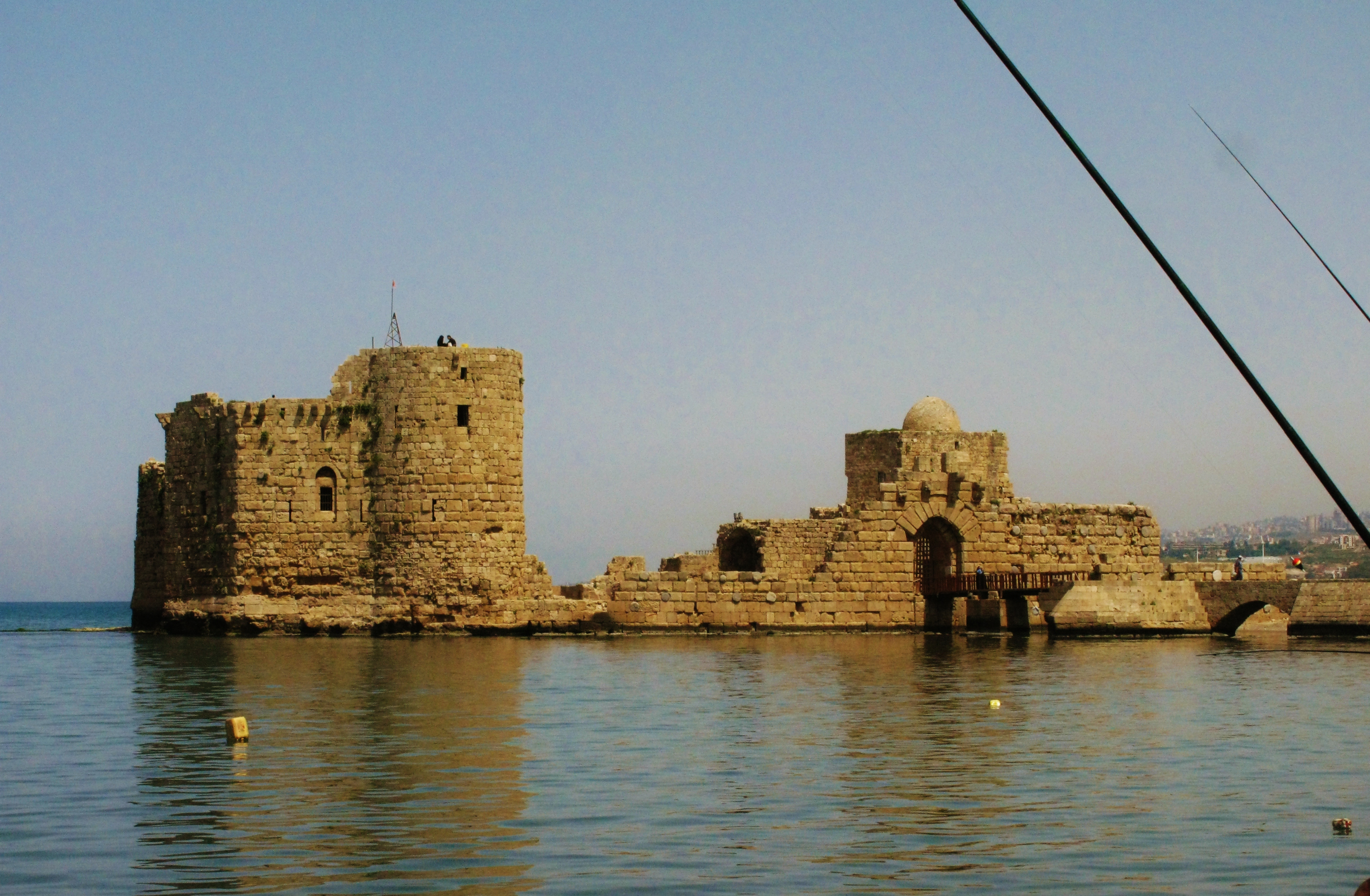
Sidon Sea Castle

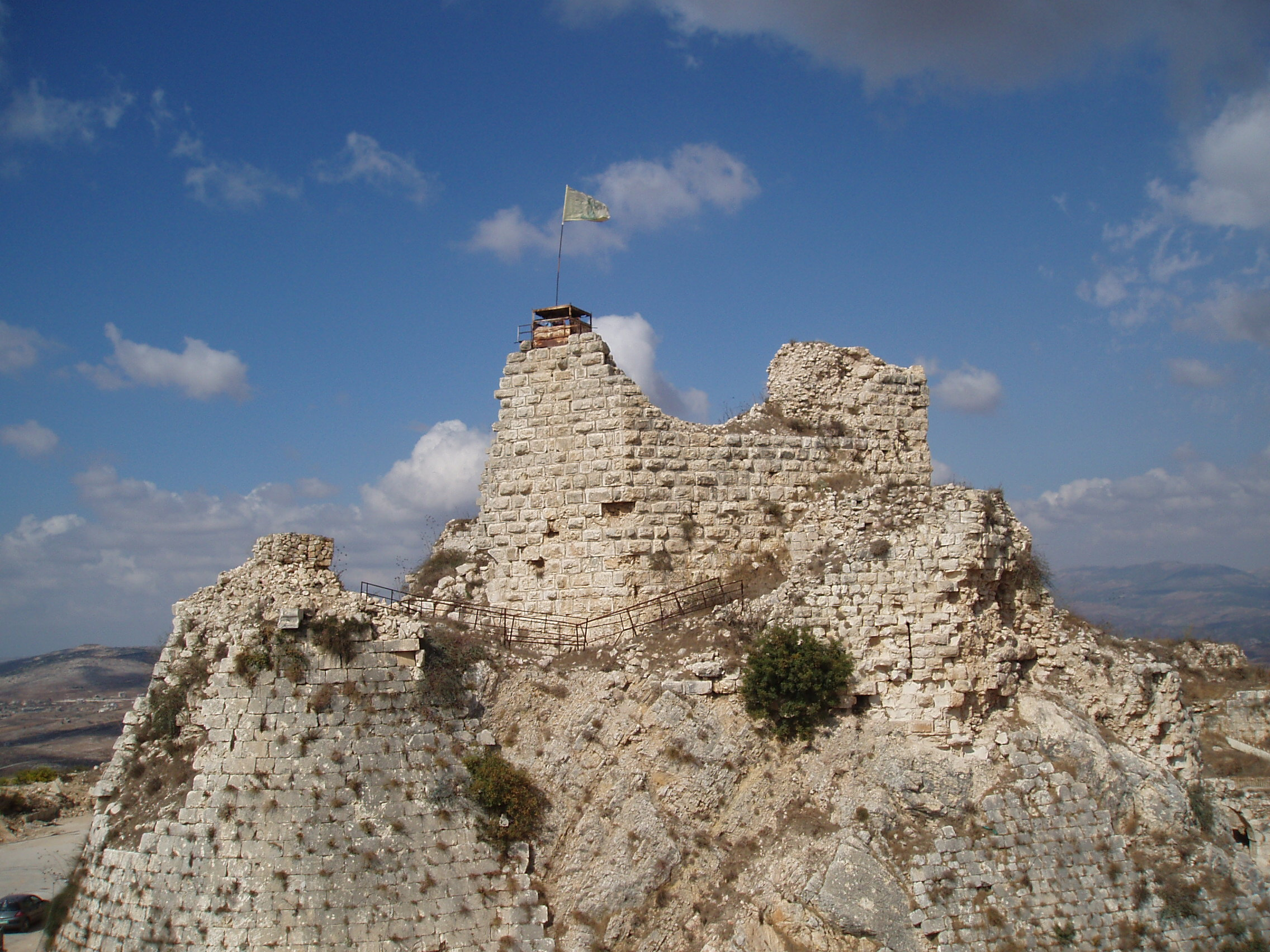
Beaufort Castle, Lebanon

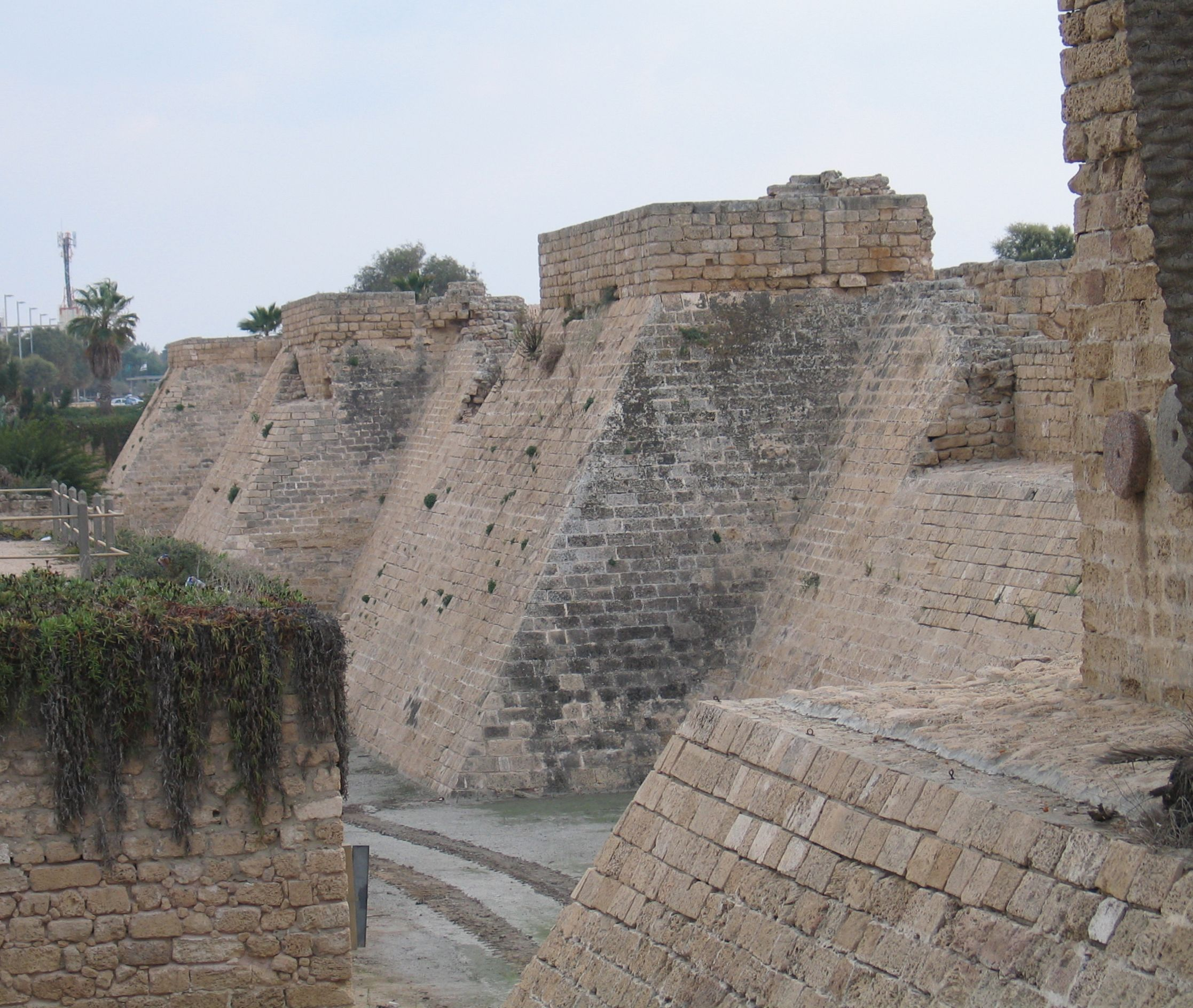
Caesarea Castle

== Bibliography ==
- Murray, Alan V. (2000). The Crusader Kingdom of Jerusalem: A Dynastic History 1099–1125. Occasional Publications UPR. pp. 193–194. ISBN 9781900934039.
- Lamonte, John L. (1932). Feudal Monarchy in the Latin Kingdom of Jerusalem, 1100–1291. The Medieval Academy of America.
- Riley-Smith, Jonathon (1973). The Feudal Nobility and the Kingdom of Jerusalem, 1174–1277. The Macmillan Press.
- Runciman, Steven (1952). A History of the Crusades, Vol. II: The Kingdom of Jerusalem and the Frankish East, 1100–1187. Cambridge University Press.
- Tibble, Steven (1989). Monarchy and Lordships in the Latin Kingdom of Jerusalem, 1099–1291. Clarendon Press.
