= Hugh de Puiset (disambiguation) =

Hugh de Puiset, Hugh du Puiset or Hugh de Le Puiset (French Hugues) may refer to several medieval men:

- Hugh I of Le Puiset (died 1096)
- Hugh I of Jaffa, also Hugh II of Le Puiset (died 1112/8), crusader
- Hugh III of Le Puiset (died 1132), crusader
- Hugh II of Jaffa (died 1134), crusader
- Hugh de Puiset (died 1195), bishop of Durham
