= Walter I Grenier =

Lord of Caesarea, Kingdom of Jerusalem

Walter I, of the House of Grenier, was the lord of Caesarea in the Kingdom of Jerusalem from the 1120s until his death in the early 1150s. He clashed with his stepfather, Count Hugh II of Jaffa, over the lordship of Sidon, leading to a dramatic public accusation that Hugh intended to assassinate King Fulk. Walter in the end never received Sidon and spent his last years heavily indebted and marginalized.

== Minority ==
Walter and his twin brother, Eustace II, were born c. 1113. They were the sons of Eustace I, lord of Sidon and Caesarea, who served as the constable of the Kingdom of Jerusalem and as regent during the captivity of King Baldwin II until his death on 15 June 1123. Since Eustace I's sons were twins, primogeniture was difficult to apply. Historian Hans Eberhard Mayer argues that his fief, situated along the coast of the kingdom, was at first meant to pass undivided to the preferred twin, Eustace II.

Walter and Eustace II's mother, Emma, married Count Hugh II of Jaffa in 1124. Hugh assumed charge of the boys' inheritance as well as of Emma's town of Jericho. Walter and Eustace II then lived with their mother and stepfather in Jaffa. Walter came of age between 1127 and March 1129, when a charter of King Baldwin II describes him as the lord of Caesarea. Since Eustace II is described as the lord of Sidon already in 1126, Mayer assumes that Eustace I's fief was divided between the twins at that time. Hugh continued to hold sway over Caesarea until 1128.

== Career ==
King Baldwin II died on 21 August 1131. Walter attended the coronation of Baldwin's successor, King Fulk, on 14 September. By this time he had a wife, Juliana, and a considerable retinue of vassals and household officers. His twin, Eustace II, had died, and Walter called himself lord of Caesarea and Sidon. He soon dropped Sidon from his title, and Mayer asserts, based on the lack of Sidon landholders' interaction with Walter, that Walter never held it. The regime of Walter's stepfather, Hugh, continued in Sidon. Walter's mother, Emma, apparently could do nothing to help Walter gain Sidon.

Walter's grievance with his stepfather, Hugh, was such that in 1134, he stood up in the royal court and accused Hugh of lèse-majesté and conspiring to kill King Fulk. Fulk himself had instigated Walter to make this accusation; the king needed a reason to revoke the fiefs of the vassal who had grown too powerful, and Walter desired Sidon, the Grenier patrimony governed by Hugh. Hugh then revolted against Fulk, lost his fiefs, and was exiled. Jericho, which belonged to Walter's mother, was also confiscated. Walter never profited, however, as the royal family retained these lands.

Having no other choice, Walter remained loyal to Fulk, who had outwitted him. He never became the king's friend either, nor was he close to Fulk's son King Baldwin III; he only witnessed one charter of each king. In his last years he had significant financial problems and incurred debts for which both he and his vassals had to serve time. He took no part in the affairs of the kingdom after 1147. He was still alive in 1149 but by 1154, he had been succeeded by his son, Hugh. Another son, Eustace, joined the lepers of the Order of Saint Lazarus.

== Sources ==
- Mayer, Hans Eberhard (1994). Kings and Lords in the Latin Kingdom of Jerusalem. Variorum Collected Studies. ISBN 0860784169.

| Preceded by Eustace | Lord of Caesarea; 1123–1154 | Succeeded by Hugh |
