= Hugh II of Jaffa =

Count in the Kingdom of Jerusalem (c. 1106 – c. 1134)

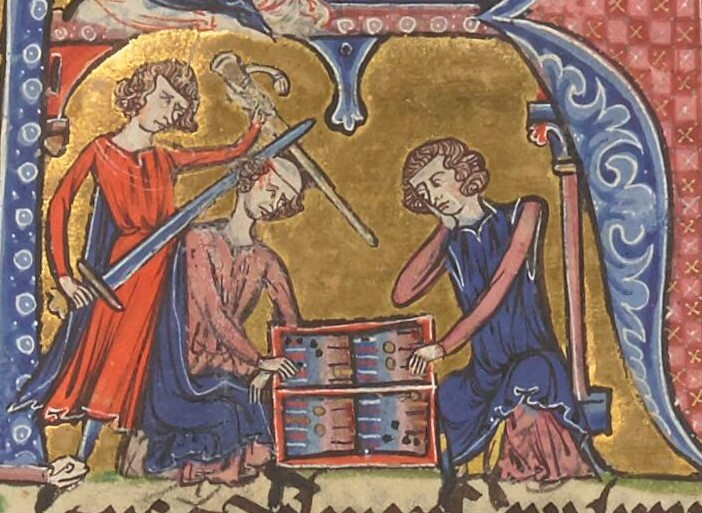
A Breton knight attempts to assassinate Hugh while he plays dice in the street

Hugh II (c. 1106 – c. 1134), also called Hugh of Le Puiset, was the first count of Jaffa in the Kingdom of Jerusalem. He was born in Apulia and came to the crusader kingdom in 1120, where he obtained Jaffa as his inheritance. King Baldwin II, who was his cousin, allowed Hugh to marry the wealthy widow Emma of Jericho in 1123; the marriage enabled Hugh to exert power over the land held by Emma and her minor sons, Eustace and Walter. After Baldwin II's death in 1131, Hugh came into a conflict with King Fulk, Baldwin's successor. Hugh opposed Fulk's attempts to exclude Queen Melisende (Fulk's wife and Hugh's cousin) from power and Fulk's replacement of the established nobility with newcomers from Europe. The tensions escalated into an open rebellion in 1134 after Hugh's stepson Walter accused him of high treason. Hugh enjoyed a broad public support until he sought help from the Egyptians, the crusaders' archenemy. After agreeing to a three-year exile, Hugh survived an assassination attempt widely attributed to Fulk. He then returned to Apulia, where he died.

== Youth ==
Hugh's parents, Hugh II of Le Puiset (also known as Hugh I of Jaffa) and Mabel of Roucy, left Chartres in France to join the military campaign organized in 1106 by Prince Bohemond I of Taranto, who was the half-brother of Mabel's mother, Sibylla. Mabel was pregnant when they departed and gave birth to Hugh in Apulia. The historian Hans Eberhard Mayer dates Hugh's birth to the period between 1106 and 1110. Hugh's father assisted Bohemond in his war and then travelled to the Kingdom of Jerusalem, a crusader state established in the Levant after the defeat of the region's Muslim rulers during the First Crusade in 1098–99. Because a newborn could not withstand such a journey, the young Hugh was left in Apulia in the care of his granduncle Bohemond.

Upon his arrival in the Levant, Hugh's father received the city of Jaffa as a fief for himself and his heirs. Archbishop William of Tyre, who narrates the story, says that the king of Jerusalem who enfeoffed Hugh's father was Baldwin II (r. 1118–1131), the elder Hugh's first cousin; but due to chronological issues, Mayer concludes that this king was actually Baldwin I (r. 1100–1118). Mayer estimates that Hugh II's father, Hugh I, had died by mid-1112. Hugh II never knew him. The king of Jerusalem then arranged for Hugh's mother, Mabel, to marry Albert of Namur, and the couple took up rule over Jaffa. They died soon thereafter. Hugh II, who had been raised in Apulia as a South Italian Norman, arrived to the Levant to claim his inheritance by 31 January 1120 and duly obtained Jaffa.

Hugh's relationship with the principal figures of the crusader states and Norman-ruled Italy

Sigelgaita | Robert Guiscard | Alberada of Buonalbergo | Roger I of Sicily
Isabella of Montlhéry | Melisende of Montlhéry | Alice of Montlhéry | Sibylla of Hauteville | Bohemond I of Taranto | Roger II of Sicily
Joscelin I of Edessa | Baldwin II of Jerusalem | Gilduin of Le Puiset | Hugh I of Jaffa | Mabel of Roucy | Bohemond II of Antioch
Joscelin II of Edessa | Alice of Jerusalem | Melisende of Jerusalem | Fulk V of Anjou | Hugh II of Jaffa | Emma of Jericho | Eustace I Grenier
Eustace II Grenier | Walter I Grenier

== Career ==
=== Rise to power ===
Eustace I Grenier, lord of Sidon and Caesarea, died on 15 June 1123. Hugh married Eustace's widow, Emma, the same year even though it was considered improper for a widow to remarry before a year had passed since her husband's death. That King Baldwin II allowed such an advantageous marriage suggests to the historian Malcolm Barber that Hugh enjoyed royal favor. Emma was the niece of the former Latin patriarch of Jerusalem, Arnulf of Chocques, who made her considerably wealthy when he gave her the town and oasis of Jericho upon her marriage to Eustace. Emma and Eustace's twin sons, Eustace II and Walter I, inherited the lordships of Sidon and Caesarea respectively. Charter evidence shows that Hugh administered Jericho on behalf of his wife and her sons; because his stepsons were minors, Mayer presumes that Hugh must have administered Sidon and Caesarea in their names as well. This would mean that Hugh controlled much of the kingdom's coast. In any case, the twins lived in Jaffa with Hugh and Emma. Eustace II had died by 1131, but Walter, who reached the age of majority in 1128, did not receive Sidon. Mayer presumes that Sidon was retained by Hugh.

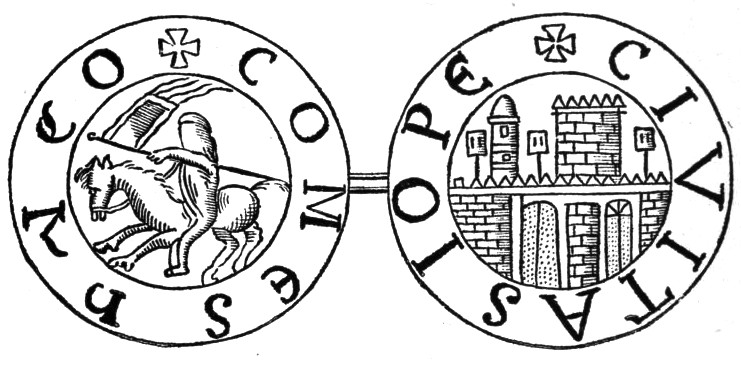
Hugh, depicted on horseback, was one of the first vassals in the Kingdom of Jerusalem to use a seal.

Hugh's life throughout Baldwin II's reign was fairly uneventful. He and his wife took an active part in the public life of the kingdom, issuing charters and witnessing those issued by the king and other notables. Hugh was the greatest lord in the kingdom after the prince of Galilee. The charters issued by him and his entourage point to his great ambition: he employed the titles comes and princeps of Jaffa and had himself styled consul of Jaffa by his men. Mayer interprets the latter title as imitating the style of the powerful counts of Anjou. He also notes that there were no other counts in the kingdom and argues that the comital title must have invited comparison with the counts of Tripoli and Edessa, who were independent rulers of neighboring crusader states. Mayer suspects that Hugh aspired to a similar autonomy. Along with another cousin of the king, Joscelin of Courtenay, lord of Tiberias, Hugh was one of the first lords in the kingdom to authenticate documents using his own seal; Hugh's seal identifies him as comes hugo. The historian Alan V. Murray sees in this a "striking example of baronial self-assertion". The royal government consistently referred to Hugh merely as dominus, but could not prevent his unilateral adoption of the higher titles. His entourage was large: in addition to his vassals, he had his own seneschal, a chancellor, a marshal, and a constable, Barisan the Old. The names of some of these men, in Mayer's opinion, indicate that Hugh surrounded himself with Normans.

In 1126 and 1127, Hugh donated land and properties in Ascalon to the Knights Hospitaller and to the Abbey of Saint Mary of the Valley of Jehosaphat, of which his uncle Gilduin of Le Puiset was abbot. Ascalon had not yet been conquered from the Fatimid Egypt, however. The original intention was that Ascalon would be added to the royal domain once it had been taken. Because King Baldwin apparently endorsed these endowments–and confirmed the gift to the abbey–the historian Jonathan Riley-Smith concludes that Ascalon was promised to Hugh in late 1125; in return, Hugh may have been expected to maintain military pressure on the city or even lead its eventual capture.

=== Rebellion ===
Count Hugh was young, tall of stature, and of handsome countenance. He was distinguished for his military prowess and was pleasing in the eyes of all. In him the gifts of nature seemed to have met in lavish abundance; without question, in respect to physical beauty and nobility of birth as well as experience in the art of war he had no equal in the kingdom. — William of Tyre, A History of Deeds Done Beyond the Sea

After Baldwin II died in 1131, his son-in-law Fulk of Anjou and daughter Melisende were crowned king and queen. Fulk initially tried to rule without Melisende, and Mayer suggests that this divided the nobles in the kingdom. According to Mayer, Hugh would have been the leader of the party which upheld the queen's right to a share in the government because they were second cousins and because he owed his rise to her father. Fulk was also actively replacing the kingdom's old nobility with newcomers from his native Anjou. Normans, who had enjoyed high offices under Baldwin II, were especially targeted; they were the neighbors and long-standing enemies of the counts of Anjou. Mayer believes that Fulk could not tolerate the establishment of yet another crusader state at the kingdom's expense–an ambition perhaps signaled by Hugh's unilateral assumption of grandiose titles–while Melisende might have been willing to allow it in return for Hugh's support in her bid for power. In addition, Riley-Smith proposes that the Egyptian embassy received by Fulk in 1131 may have offered a truce and the surrender of Ascalon; Fulk then either refused the offer or pressed for more than the Egyptians were willing to concede, leaving Hugh deprived of the city which had been promised to him.

William of Tyre recorded the gossip that Hugh was conducting an affair with the queen, and that their relationship made the king furious. Mayer argues that William himself did not believe this, and that the constant presence of her household and courtiers would have made it extremely difficult for a medieval queen to maintain a secret affair. The historian Bernard Hamilton notes that the clergy and the public supported Melisende, which would not have been the case if she had been unfaithful. Mayer suspects that it was Fulk who engineered the rumors in an effort to vanquish both Hugh and Melisende.

In July 1134, Hugh visited Melisende's sister Princess Alice of Antioch in Laodicea. Alice was engaged in her own struggle with Fulk, who prevented her from ruling Antioch. Mayer suggests that the two might have conspired against Fulk. The tensions came to a breaking point later that year when Hugh's stepson Walter publicly accused Hugh in the curia regis of lèse-majesté and conspiracy to murder the king. William says that Fulk incited Walter to make this accusation. Hugh denied the accusation. William narrates that some people were not convinced that Hugh was having an affair with Melisende, but they admitted that Hugh refused obedience to Fulk. Hugh was then challenged by Walter to a trial by combat. He retired from the court to Jaffa and failed to appear on the designated day; the historian Steven Runciman suggests that he might have been induced to stay away by Countess Emma, fearful of losing either husband or son, or by Queen Melisende. Because of his absence, he was found guilty by default. A vassal convicted for treason could have his fief confiscated. Roman of Le Puy, another powerful lord, joined Hugh's cause.

In his desperation, Hugh sailed to Ascalon and appealed to its Egyptian garrison for help. An alliance with Muslims was not in itself shocking, but when the Egyptians proceeded to raid the kingdom as far as Arsuf, Hugh's public image was destroyed. His constable, Barisan the Old, and other vassals, who had hitherto supported Hugh, left their fiefs and joined the king. The king then besieged Jaffa until the patriarch, William of Malines, intervened. It was agreed that the count and his remaining followers would be exiled for three years and that the revenues of his fiefs would be enjoyed by the king during that time. After three years, the rebels would be allowed to return and Jaffa would be restored to Hugh. Because the law allowed a permanent confiscation, Riley-Smith considers this sentence to have been extraordinarily lenient.

== Assassination attempt and exile ==
After the sentence was pronounced, Hugh waited in Jerusalem for a ship to take him to Europe. One night, when he was playing dice in the Street of the Furriers, Hugh was stabbed by a Breton knight. He survived and was allowed to remain in the kingdom until he recovered. The assassination attempt caused a massive uproar in the city, and the public sympathized with Hugh. Fulk was widely suspected of having ordered it; Hugh's death would circumvent the compromise agreement and leave his lands permanently in the king's domain. The knight was tried and condemned to mutilation; he never implicated the king, admitting only that he had hoped to gain royal favor. William of Tyre wrote that the king's reputation was thus saved, but Mayer argues that it was severely damaged. The queen was furious: she persecuted everyone who had sided with her husband against Hugh with such severity that they avoided being in her presence or at public gatherings.

Hugh eventually departed for Apulia, where King Roger of Sicily granted him the lordship of Gargano. He died soon after, possibly of the long-term effects of his wounding. According to William of Tyre's 13th-century French translator, Melisende long grieved that he had died "for her". She was so infuriated by Fulk's treatment of Hugh and the slight on her honor that Fulk feared for his life and his supporters did not dare appear in her presence. Fulk and the successive kings of Jerusalem took steps to prevent the rise of another powerful count of Jaffa: several smaller lordships were erected for Hugh's former vassals, and the county remained in the royal family for the rest of the 12th century.

== Sources ==
- Barber, Malcolm (2012). The Crusader States. Yale University Press. ISBN 978-0300189315.
- Hamilton, Bernard (1978). "Women in the Crusader States: The Queens of Jerusalem" (PDF). In Derek Baker (ed.). Medieval Women. Ecclesiastical History Society.
- Mayer, Hans Eberhard (1972). "Studies in the History of Queen Melisende of Jerusalem". Dumbarton Oaks Papers. 26. Dumbarton Oaks: 93–182. doi:10.2307/1291317. JSTOR 1291317.
- Mayer, Hans Eberhard (1985). "The Origins of the County of Jaffa". Israel Exploration Journal. 35 (1). Israel Exploration Society: 35–45. ISSN 0021-2059. JSTOR 27925970.
- Mayer, Hans Eberhard (1985b). "The Origins of the Lordships of Ramla and Lydda in the Latin Kingdom of Jerusalem". Speculum. 60 (3). [Medieval Academy of America, Cambridge University Press, University of Chicago Press]: 537–552. doi:10.2307/2848174. ISSN 0038-7134. JSTOR 2848174.
- Mayer, Hans Eberhard (1989). "Angevins versus Normans: The New Men of King Fulk of Jerusalem". Proceedings of the American Philosophical Society. 133 (1). American Philosophical Society: 1–25. ISSN 0003-049X. JSTOR 987158.
- Mayer, Hans Eberhard (1990). "The Wheel of Fortune: Seignorial Vicissitudes under Kings Fulk and Baldwin III of Jerusalem". Speculum. 65 (4). University of Chicago Press: 860–877. doi:10.2307/2863565. ISSN 0038-7134. JSTOR 2863565.
- Monte, John L. La (1942). "The Lords of Le Puiset on the Crusades". Speculum. 17 (1). [Medieval Academy of America, Cambridge University Press, University of Chicago Press]: 100–118. doi:10.2307/2856610. ISSN 0038-7134. JSTOR 2856610.
- Murray, Alan V. (2000). The Crusader Kingdom of Jerusalem: A Dynastic History 1099-1125. Occasional Publications UPR. ISBN 978-1-900934-03-9.
- Riley-Smith, Jonathan (1997). "King Fulk of Jerusalem and 'the Sultan of Babylon". In Kedar, Benjamin Z. (ed.). Montjoie: Studies in Crusade History in Honour of Hans Eberhard Mayer. Ashgate.
- Runciman, Steven (1952). A History of the Crusades: The Kingdom of Jerusalem and the Frankish East, 1100–1187. Vol. 2. Cambridge University Press. ISBN 0241298768.
- Tibble, Steven (1989). Monarchy and Lordships in the Latin Kingdom of Jerusalem, 1099-1291. Clarendon Press. ISBN 978-0-19-822731-1.

Titles of nobility
| Preceded by Albert | Lord/count of Jaffa c. 1120-1134 | Vacant In royal domain until 1151 Title next held by Amalric |
