= Siege of Sidon =

1110 battle of the Norwegian Crusade

- Part of the Norwegian Crusade
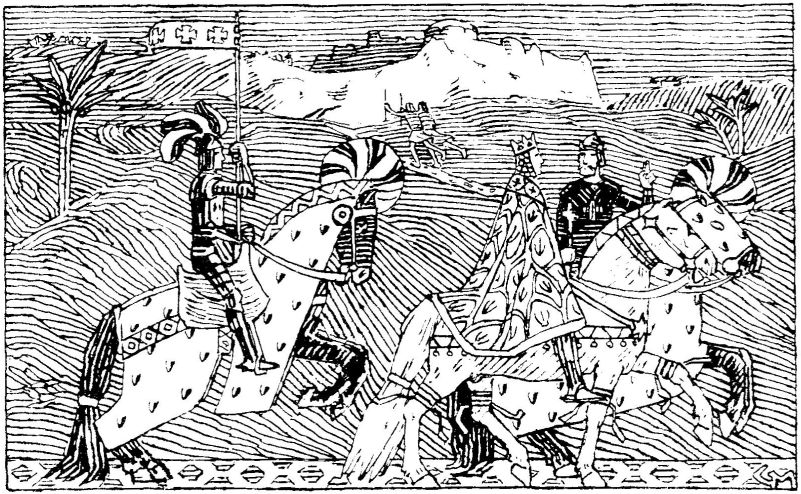
- King Sigurd and King Baldwin ride from Jerusalem to the river Jordan by Gerhard Munthe
Date	19 October – 5 December 1110
Location	Sidon, present-day Lebanon
Result	Crusader victory
Territorial changes	Establishment of the Lordship of Sidon

Belligerents
Kingdom of Jerusalem; Kingdom of Norway; Republic of Venice	Fatimid Caliphate

Commanders and leaders
(Kingdom of Jerusalem) Baldwin I of Jerusalem; Sigurd I of Norway; (Republic of Venice) Ordelafo Faliero	Governor of Sidon (Note: The Fatimids would very often leave the responsibility of defending a city in the hands of a governor, as they did when Jerusalem was taken by the crusaders.)

Strength
Norwegians: 5,000 men; 60 galleys; Franks: Many crusaders and siege weapons; Venetians: A fleet of ships, strength unknown	Fatimids: Probably only the city's garrison

Casualties and losses
Unknown, but probably minor	Unknown, but probably large

The siege of Sidon occurred in 1110 in the aftermath of the First Crusade. The coastal city of Sidon was captured by the forces of Baldwin I of Jerusalem and Sigurd I of Norway, with assistance from Ordelafo Faliero, Doge of Venice.

== Background ==
In August 1108, Baldwin marched out against Sidon, with the support of a squadron of sailor-adventurers from various Italian cities. However, the Egyptian fleet defeated the Italians in a sea-battle outside the harbour. Upon the arrival of additional Turkish horsemen from Damascus, Baldwin decided to lift the siege.

In the summer of 1110, a Norwegian fleet of 60 ships arrived in the Levant under the command of King Sigurd. Arriving in Acre he was received by Baldwin. Together they made a journey to the Jordan River, after which Baldwin asked for help in capturing Muslim-held ports on the coast. Sigurd answered they "had come for the purpose of devoting themselves to the service of Christ", and accompanied him to take Sidon, which had been re-fortified by the Fatimids in 1098.

== Siege ==
Baldwin's army besieged the city by land, while the Norwegians came by sea. A naval force was needed to prevent assistance from the Fatimid fleet at Tyre. Repelling it was made possible with the arrival of a Venetian fleet. The city fell after 47 days.

The Icelandic skald Einarr Skúlason gives the following account.

Sætt frá ek dœla dróttin, drengr minnisk þess, vinna, tóku hvast í hristar hríð valslöngur ríða. Sterkr braut váligt virki vals munnlitaðr gunnar, fögr ruðusk sverð en sigri snjallr bragningr hlaut fagna.	The Norsemen's king, the skalds relate, Has ta'en the heathen town of Saet: The slinging engine with dread noise Gables and roofs with stones destroys. The town wall totters too, — it falls; The Norsemen mount the blackened walls. He who stains red the raven's bill Has won, — the town lies at his will.

== Aftermath ==
When the city surrendered, King Baldwin gave the same terms of surrender he had previously given to Arsuf and Acre. He allowed safe conduct of passage for those leaving and even allowed some members of the Muslim populace to remain in peace. By order of Baldwin and the Patriarch of Jerusalem, Ghibbelin of Arles, a splinter was taken off the True Cross and given to Sigurd. The Lordship of Sidon was created and given to Eustace Grenier, later a constable of the Kingdom of Jerusalem.

== Sources ==
- Battles and sieges, Tony Jaques
- The Crusades and the expansion of Catholic Christendom, 1000–1714, John France
- The Second Crusade, Jonathan Phillips
- The chronicle of Ibn al-Athīr for the crusading period from al-Kāmil fīʼl-taʼrīkh, ʻIzz al-Dīn Ibn al-Athīr and Donald Sidney
- Saga of Sigurd the Crusader and His Brothers Eystein and Olaf
