= Eustace II =

Eustace II may refer to:

- Eustace II of Boulogne (r. 1049–1087)
- Eustace II of Sidon, lord, mentioned by William of Tyre between 1124 and 1154
- Eustace II of Conflans (fl. 1210–1243), lord
