= Versus de viris illustribus diocesis Tarvanensis qui in sacra fuere expeditione =

The Versus de viris illustribus diocesis Tarvanensis qui in sacra fuere expeditione is a Latin poem listing noblemen from the diocese of Thérouanne who joined the First Crusade and never returned. It is a work of the 12th century that survives in at least five manuscripts, often accompanying Fulcher of Chartres's Historia. The title by which it is known is a modern one. It was first published in the 18th century by Edmond Martène and Ursin Durand. It has been edited more recently by Charles Moeller.

The following persons are named:

- Godfrey of Bouillon
- Baldwin of Boulogne
- Evremar of Chocques
- Arnulf of Chocques
- Hugh of Fauquembergues
- Eustace Grenier
- Fulk of Guînes
- Hugh of Rebecques, lord of Hebron
- Achard of Arrouaise
- Baldwin of Boulogne, bishop of Beirut

Depending on the reading, the poem may also name a tenth crusader, Harbel Ramensis or Harbel of Rama.

== Bibliography ==
- Buck, Andrew D. (2022). "Remembering Outremer in the West: The Secunda pars historiae Iherosolimitane and the Crisis of Crusading in Mid-twelfth-century France". Speculum. 97 (2): 377–414. doi:10.1086/718762.
- LaMonte, John L. (1944–1945). "The Lords of Sidon in the Twelfth and Thirteenth Centuries". Byzantion. 17: 183–211.
- Moeller, Charles (1904). "Les flamands du Ternois au Royaume latin de Jérusalem". Mélanges Paul Fredericq: Hommage de la Société pour le progrès des études philologiques et historiques. Geneva. pp. 189–202.
- Paul, Nicholas L. (2012). To Follow in Their Footsteps: The Crusades and Family Memory in the High Middle Ages. Cornell University Press.
- Tanner, Heather J. (2004). Families, Friends and Allies: Boulogne and Politics in Northern France and England, c.879–1160. Brill. doi:10.1163/9789047402558.
