= Reginald of Sidon =

Crusader noble (died 1202)

Reginald I Grenier
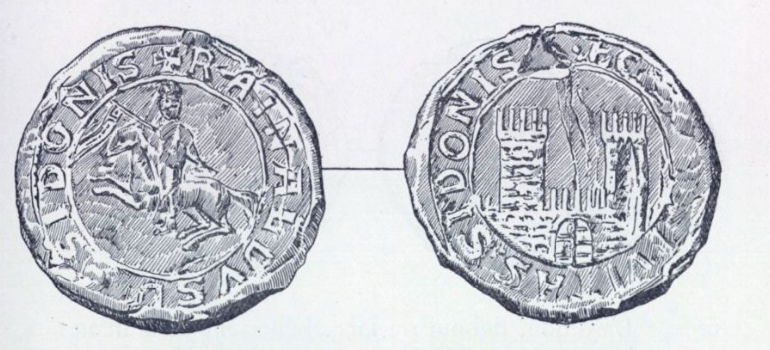
- Seal of Reginald of Sidon.

Lord of Sidon
- Reign: 1171–1202
- Successor: Balian
- Born: 1130s
- Died: 1202
- Spouse: Agnes of Courtenay; Helvis of Ibelin
- Issue: Agnes; Fenie (Euphemia); Balian
- House: Grenier
- Father: Gerard of Sidon
- Mother: Agnes of Bures
- Religion: Roman Catholicism

Reginald Grenier (1130s – 1202; also Reynald or Renaud) was lord of Sidon and an important noble in the late-12th century Kingdom of Jerusalem.

== Rise to fame ==
Reginald was the son of Gerard Grenier and Agnes of Bures, and a grandson of Eustace Grenier. He first rose to prominence in the Kingdom in 1170, when he married Agnes of Courtenay, who had been married three times before: firstly to Reginald of Marash, who left her a widow; secondly (possibly bigamously) to Amalric, count of Jaffa and Ascalon and future king of Jerusalem, with whom she had two children, Baldwin IV and Sibylla; and thirdly to Hugh of Ibelin, her fiancé or husband before her marriage to Amalric. Her marriage to Amalric was annulled in 1163 when it was discovered that the two were related within the prohibited degrees of consanguinity. Some writers have claimed that the marriage between Agnes and Reginald of Sidon was annulled as well, as they were related within the prohibited degrees, but this is based on a misinterpretation of William of Tyre, who says Gerard discovered the relationship between "the two aforementioned people". However, this must be referring back to the marriage of Agnes and Amalric: Gerard was dead by the time of Reginald's marriage. In December 1179, "Agnes, Countess of Sidon" and "Reginald of Sidon" witnessed a charter together: there is no evidence to suggest they were not still a couple. (See Hamilton, The Leper King & his Heirs for further discussion of this.)

In 1174, Amalric died and was succeeded by his leprous and underaged son Baldwin IV. Reginald now became stepfather to the king. A bailli, or regent, needed to be appointed, and Reginald was among the supporters of Raymond III of Tripoli (Amalric's first cousin) over Miles of Plancy for this post.

Reginald was present at the Battle of Montgisard in 1177, but not at the Battle of Jacob's Ford in 1179, having arrived too late with his forces; according to William of Tyre, he could have saved many of the refugees from the battle if he had continued on his way, but when he returned to Sidon, these refugees were killed in ambushes. He participated in the defense of the kingdom when Saladin invaded in 1183; this time William lists him among those "distinguished for prowess in battle." His wife was sometimes present on military campaigns, looking after her ailing but determined son.

== Succession disputes in the Kingdom ==
By this time Baldwin IV was ruling on his own, without the need for a regent. To boost the hope of military support from his cousin Henry II of England and to reduce Raymond of Tripoli's influence, in 1180 Baldwin had married his widowed sister Sibylla to a Poitevin noble, Guy of Lusignan, a vassal of the Angevins, whose older brother Amalric had already established himself at court. As the king's health failed, he appointed Guy regent in 1183 during Saladin's invasion, although Raymond and his allies were extremely hostile towards him. However, the king soon became disillusioned with Guy's abilities and demoted him. In 1183 he had Baldwin V, the young son of Sibylla and her first husband William of Montferrat, crowned as co-king, in an attempt to prevent Sibylla and Guy from succeeding. Reginald supported this and was present at the coronation.

Agnes died probably in the second half of 1184, and Baldwin IV in spring 1185. Baldwin V, with Raymond III as regent, lasted as king for less than a year before he too died in 1186. Reginald was among the nobles who tried to prevent Sibylla and Guy succeeding to the throne after Baldwin V's death, but failed.

== Battle of Hattin and the Third Crusade ==
The dispute between Guy and Raymond threatened the security of the Kingdom, as Guy planned to besiege Raymond's fief of Tiberias, which itself had allied with Saladin. Balian of Ibelin, another of Raymond's supporters, instead suggested that Guy send an embassy to Raymond in Tripoli, hoping the two could be reconciled before Guy made a foolish attack on Saladin's larger army. Reginald accompanied Balian, Gerard of Ridefort (Grand Master of the Knights Templar), Roger de Moulins (Grand Master of the Knights Hospitaller), and Joscius, Archbishop of Tyre to Tripoli. On May 1, the Templars and Hospitallers were defeated by Saladin's son al-Afdal at the Battle of Cresson; Balian had stopped at his fief of Nablus and Reginald had stopped at his castle at Beaufort, and the two were not present for the fighting. Raymond heard news of the defeat, met the embassy at Tiberias, and accompanied them back to Jerusalem.

The subsequent invasion of the Kingdom by Saladin was met by Guy, Raymond, and the crusader army at the Battle of Hattin. The battle was a crushing defeat for the crusaders; Reginald was in the rearguard with Balian and Joscelin III of Edessa, his late wife's brother, and escaped with them; according to later western chronicles of the Third Crusade, they were cowards and trampled their own men in the rush, but more likely they were simply trying to break the Muslim encirclement of the crusader army. This did not work, and Reginald and Balian fled to Tyre, where Reginald may have briefly taken command of the city after the departure of Raymond of Tripoli. The thirteenth century Old French Continuation of William of Tyre, including the Chronicle of Ernoul, claims that he was in the process of negotiating its surrender to Saladin when Conrad of Montferrat arrived. Saladin had given Reginald banners to be hung from the city's towers, but Reginald was afraid of retaliation from the citizens if Saladin himself was not present. Conrad threw the banners away and expelled Reginald. However, this is questionable: the Arab chroniclers say nothing of this, and subsequently Reginald and Conrad were close allies. Reginald may have left Tyre for Beaufort (Sidon having also been captured in the aftermath of Hattin), just as Raymond III had left for Tripoli: the priority of such magnates being to defend their own territories. However, he was certainly back in Tyre in 1188, when he witnessed a charter for Conrad.

In 1189, Reginald entered into negotiations with Saladin for the surrender of Beaufort. He offered to retire to Damascus and convert to Islam, but it was all a ruse: he was only wasting time in order to allow the defenses of the castle to be strengthened. Upon returning to the castle he ordered its guards to stand down in Arabic, but in French told them to continue their resistance. According to The Old French Continuation of William of Tyre, Saladin tortured Reginald outside the castle until the garrison surrendered, although in reality it does not seem to have surrendered at this time; Reginald was imprisoned in Damascus, and the castle eventually fell on April 22, 1190, in return for his release.

After his release, Reginald married Helvis, the eldest daughter of Balian of Ibelin and Maria Comnena. He then played an influential role in the politics of the Third Crusade. He supported the annulment of the marriage of Humphrey IV of Toron and Isabella of Jerusalem, so that Isabella could be married off to Conrad of Montferrat; the anonymous author of the Itinerarium Peregrinorum et Gesta Regis Ricardi calls Reginald a member of a "council of consummate iniquity" (together with Balian of Ibelin and Maria Comnena and Payen of Haifa) for supporting this act. His Arabic skills made him useful as a diplomat: he negotiated with Saladin on behalf of Conrad in 1191-92, and later helped negotiate peace between Richard and Saladin in 1192. Sidon was recovered from Saladin in 1197.

== Personal life ==
Reginald was described in the Lignages d'Outremer as "extremely ugly and very wise". He was one of the few native barons of the Kingdom who spoke Arabic and was knowledgeable about Arabic literature. He was on good terms with Saladin's brother Al-Adil: his negotiations with Conrad were discovered by Richard I's faction when Humphrey of Toron saw him going hunting with Al-Adil. This did not endear him to those western chroniclers who supported Richard and Guy of Lusignan: like Raymond of Tripoli, he was even (falsely) accused of having secretly converted to Islam.

After his release from captivity in 1190, he married Helvis of Ibelin, daughter of his friends Balian and Maria, and over 40 years his junior (she was probably born in 1178). He had three children, all apparently by Helvis, according to the Lignages d'Outremer, although some modern genealogies suggest that the two girls may have been by Agnes.

- Agnes, m. Raoul of Saint Omer, seneschal of Jerusalem (stepson of Raymond III of Tripoli).
- Fenie (Euphemia), m. Odo of Saint Omer, constable of Tripoli, lord of Gogulat (stepson of Raymond III of Tripoli, brother of Raoul).
- Balian, was betrothed to Margaret of Brienne but Margaret was seduced by Emperor Frederick II. Balian married Ida de Reynel instead and succeeded his father Reginald as Count of Sidon in 1202.

After Reginald's death, Helvis married Guy of Montfort.

== Sources ==
- William of Tyre, A History of Deeds Done Beyond the Sea. E. A. Babcock and A. C. Krey, trans. Columbia University Press, 1943.
- De Expugnatione Terrae Sanctae per Saladinum, translated by James A. Brundage, in The Crusades: A Documentary Survey. Marquette University Press, 1962.
- Chronicle of the Third Crusade, a Translation of Itinerarium Peregrinorum et Gesta Regis Ricardi, translated by Helen J. Nicholson. Ashgate, 1997.
- Peter W. Edbury, The Conquest of Jerusalem and the Third Crusade: Sources in Translation. Ashgate, 1996.
- Bernard Hamilton, "Women in the Crusader States: The Queens of Jerusalem", in Medieval Women, edited by Derek Baker. Ecclesiastical History Society, 1978
- Bernard Hamilton, The Leper King and his Heirs: Baldwin IV and the Crusader Kingdom of Jerusalem. Cambridge University Press, 2000.
- LaMonte, John L. (1945). "The lords of Sidon in the twelfth and thirteenth centuries". Byzantion. 17: 183–211.
- Hans Eberhard Mayer, "The Beginnings of King Amalric of Jerusalem", in B. Z. Kedar (ed.), The Horns of Hattin, Jerusalem, 1992, pp. 121–35.
- Marie-Adélaïde Nielen (ed.),Lignages d'Outremer, Académie des inscriptions et belles-lettres, 1993.
- Reinhold Röhricht (ed.), Regesta Regni Hierosolymitani MXCVII-MCCXCI, and Additamentum, Berlin, 1893-1904.
- Runciman, Steven (1952). A History of the Crusades, vol. II: The Kingdom of Jerusalem. Cambridge University Press.
