= Hugh Grenier =

12th-century Lord of Caesarea

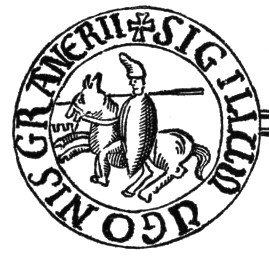
- Seal of Hugh of Grenier ("Sigilium Ugonis Granerii")
- Born: unknown
- Died: after May 1168
- Spouse: Isabelle
- Issue (See more): Guy Grenier; Walter II Grenier; Julianne Grenier
- House: Grenier
- Father: Walter I Grenier
- Mother: Julianne

Hugh Grenier (died 1168/1174) was the lord of Caesarea from 1149/1154 until his death. He was the younger son of Walter I Grenier and his wife, Julianne. His older brother, Eustace (II), was prevented by leprosy from inheriting the lordship and it passed to Hugh.

The date of Walter I's death and Hugh's accession is unknown. Walter was still alive and ruling in 1149, and Hugh is first attested as lord by a royal charter of 1154. It is possible that his elder brother Eustace briefly held the lordship before joining the Order of Saint Lazarus for lepers. Unlike his father, Hugh had a close relationship with the kings of Jerusalem. He was a patron of the Order of the Hospital.

== War leader ==
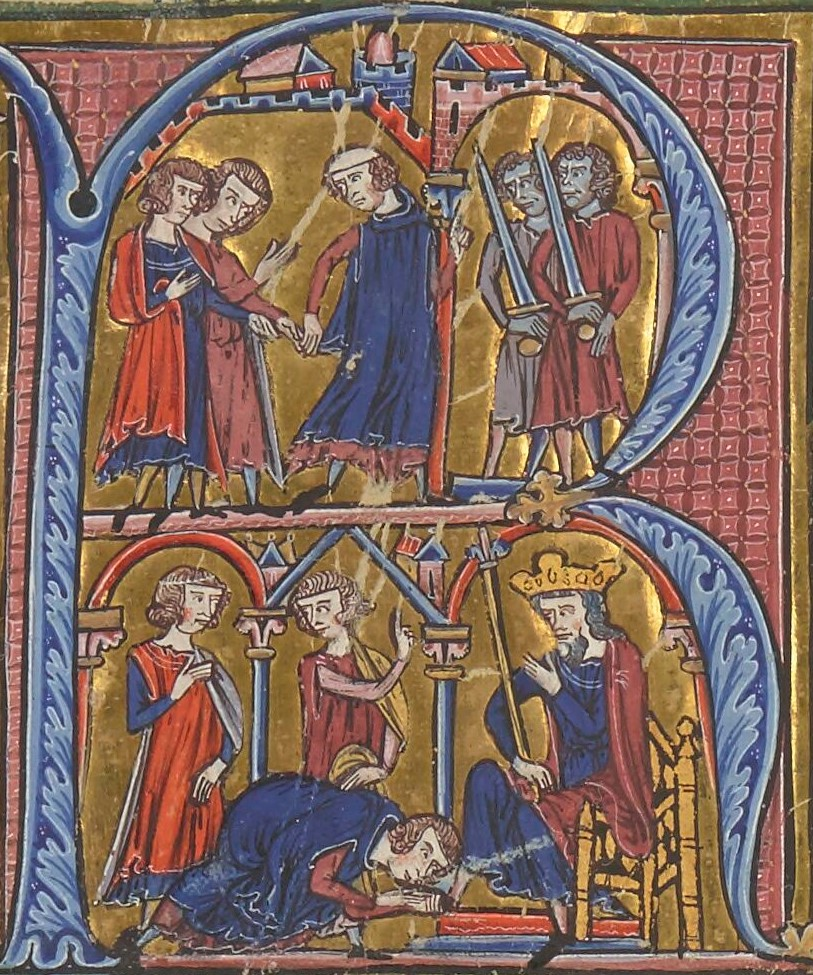
Hugh visits the vizier Shawar as one of King Amalric's envoys

Hugh was a regular attendant at the royal court under Baldwin III (1143–63), Melisende (regent, 1153–61) and Amalric I (1163–74): he signed as a witness to nine acts of each of the two kings (Note: Dated to 1154, 1155, 1157, 1160, 1161, 1164, 1165, 1166, 1168.) and one of Melisende's. (Note: Dated to 1159.) Hugh also witnessed several aristocratic charters: one of Amalric's from 1155, while Amalric was still just Count of Jaffa; another of Hugh of Ibelin from the same year; and one of Walter of Saint-Omer, Prince of Galilee, from 1168.

Hugh participated in two royal expeditions: the siege of Blahasent, near Sidon, and Amalric's invasion of Egypt. According to William of Tyre, he was "a young man of admirable wisdom and discretion far beyond his years" when Amalric sent him to negotiate with the Egyptians in 1167. At the court of the Fatimid caliph, al-'Āḍid, Hugh demanded to shake the caliph's ungloved hand to ratify the treaty signed by the two, a demand which, though met, shocked the caliph's courtiers. William of Tyre's description of the caliphal palace in Cairo is based on the description he received from Hugh.

In the war against Nur ad-Din, Hugh was captured at the Battle of al-Babein (Lamonia) by the forces of Saladin after his men abandoned him. When Nur ad-Din sued for peace, his general, Shirkuh, requested that Hugh, whom he called "a great prince of high rank and much influence among your own people", act as an intermediary, but the latter refused—"lest it might seem that he was more interested in obtaining his own liberty than concerned for the public welfare". Only after a treaty was drafted was Hugh freed to "put the final touches to it". Although the primary source is William of Tyre, that Hugh was held in high regard by the Muslims can be regarded as fact.

== Religious patronage ==
In 1154, Hugh granted a piece of land at Chaco to the Hospitallers. In 1163 he gave them Zafaria and Albeira in exchange for Altafia, a property previously donated to them by his grandfather, Eustace I. In 1166 he sold them the casale at Hadedun for 2,000 bezants. He also donated to them the coastal hilltop Turris Salinarum (Saltworks Tower), a donation later confirmed by his son.

In 1160, Hugh bestowed land and revenues on Santa Maria Latina for the benefit of the souls of his father and grandfather, who were buried there. That same year he donated a house and some lands to the Order of Saint Lazarus. In 1166, Hugh sold land at Feissa (Khirbat al-Dafīs) and confirmed his father and grandfather's gifts to the Order of the Holy Sepulchre in return for 400 bezants.

== Family ==
Hugh married Isabelle (Elizabeth), daughter of John Goman (Gothmann), and she appears with him in five of his charters. They had two sons and a daughter: Guy, Walter II and Juliana, all three succeeding to the fief of Caesarea in turn. The Lignages d'Outremer mentions only Walter and Julianne. In 1161, Hugh approved a sale made by his father-in-law. After Hugh's death, his widow married Baldwin of Ibelin.

Hugh died between May 1168, when he witnessed a royal charter at Acre, and July 1174, when his eldest son signed a charter as lord of Caesarea.

== Notes ==
Preceded by Walter I	Lord of Caesarea; 1149/54–1168/74	Succeeded by Guy
