= Arnulf of Chocques =

Latin Patriarch of Jerusalem in 1099 and from 1112 to 1118

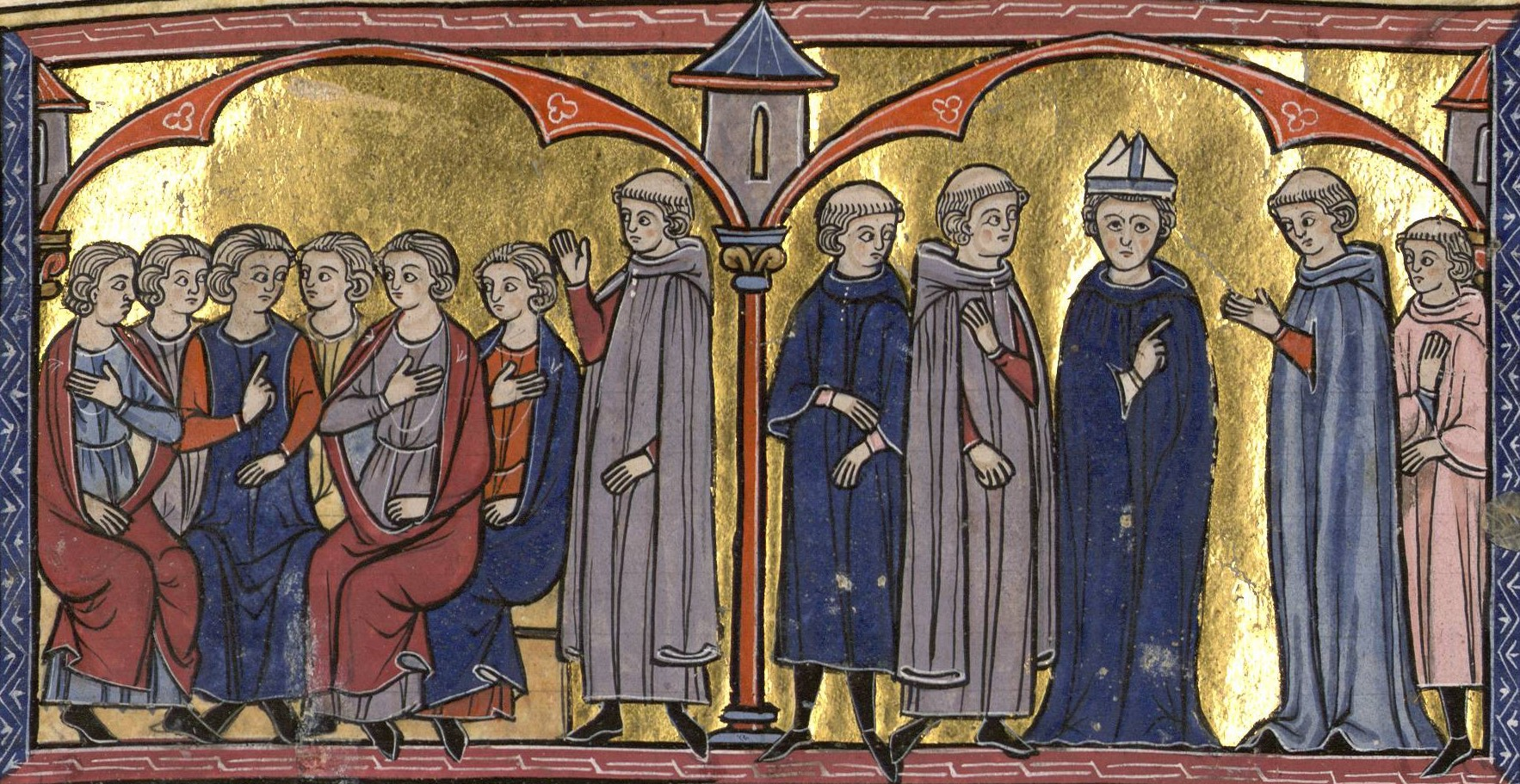
13th-century depiction of the election of Arnulf to the patriarchate

Arnulf of Chocques (died 1118) was a leading member of the clergy during the First Crusade, being made Latin Patriarch of Jerusalem in 1099 and again from 1112 to 1118. Sometimes referred to as Arnulf of Rœulx, presumably after the village of Rœulx some 70km from his home village of Chocques, he was given the nickname Malecorne, meaning badly tonsured.

== Biography ==
Arnulf was the illegitimate son of a Flemish priest, and studied under Lanfranc at Caen. In the 1070s he was a tutor to Cecilia, daughter of William I of England. He also taught Ralph of Caen, one of the later chroniclers of the First Crusade. He was also close to Odo of Bayeux, whom he accompanied on the Crusade. He was the chaplain of the Norman crusader army led by Robert of Normandy, Cecilia's brother and William's son. He was most likely appointed a papal legate, under the authority of the overall legate Adhemar of Le Puy, and after Adhemar's death in 1098 he shared control of the clergy with fellow legate Peter of Narbonne. Some of the knights in the other crusader armies believed he was corrupt, and they apparently sang vulgar songs about him, but most crusaders respected him as an eloquent preacher.

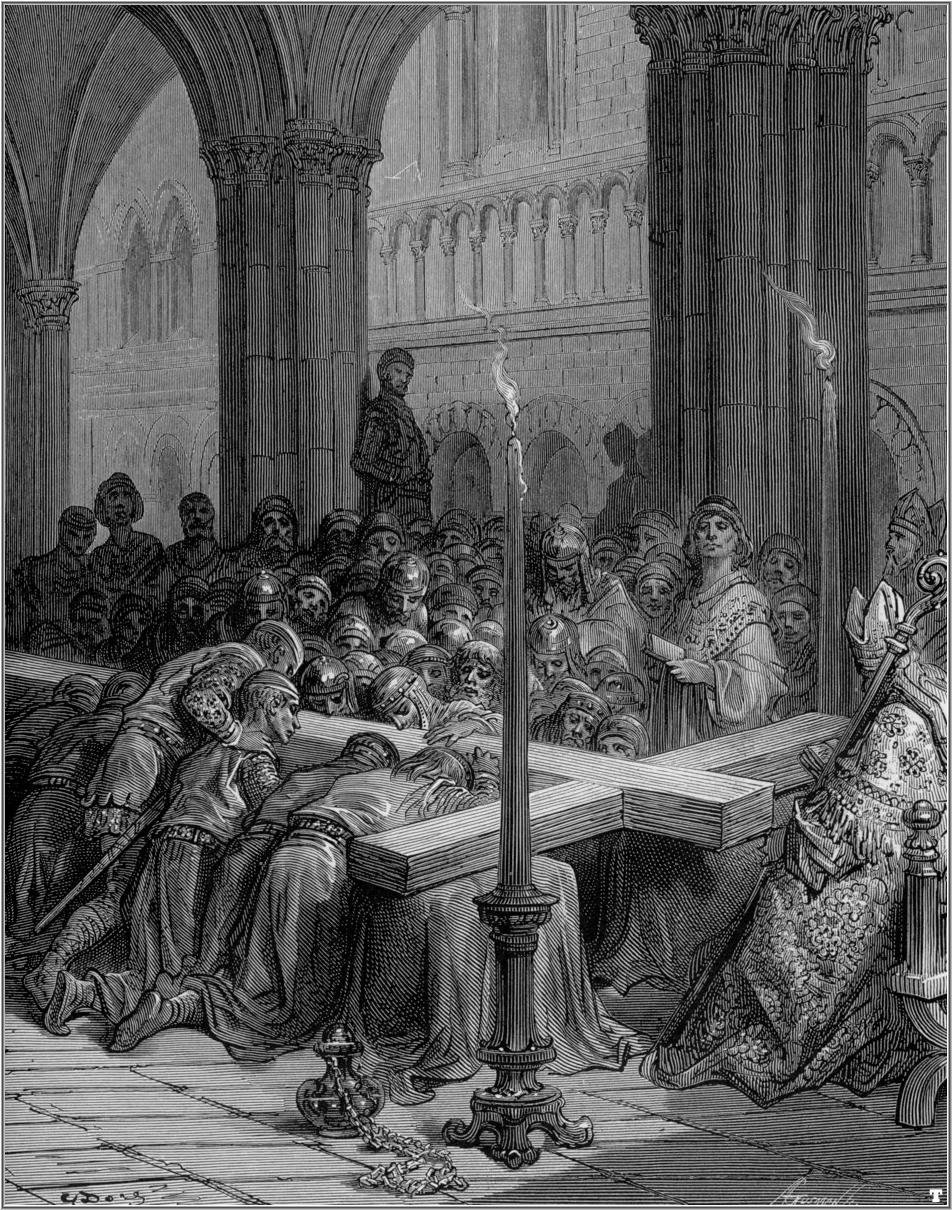
"The Discovery of the True Cross" (Gustave Doré)

He was one of the chief skeptics about Peter Bartholomew's claims to have discovered the Holy Lance in Antioch, and because of Arnulf's opposition Peter volunteered to undergo an ordeal by fire. Arnulf's opposition to Peter brought him into conflict with Raymond of St. Gilles, who believed Peter's story. To help ease the crisis among the crusaders over the issue, and also to lift spirits after Peter's death during the ordeal, Arnulf helped make a statue of Christ which was placed on one of the siege engines during the siege of Jerusalem. After the capture of Jerusalem he discovered the True Cross in the Church of the Holy Sepulchre. This discovery was not as controversial as the discovery of the Lance, although it was just as suspicious. Arnulf might have been trying to make up for the problems he caused disproving the authenticity of the Lance, and the True Cross became the most sacred relic of the Kingdom of Jerusalem.

After Raymond left Jerusalem on 1 August 1099, Arnulf was elected Latin patriarch of Jerusalem. He was supported by Godfrey of Bouillon, the first ruler of Jerusalem, and in turn he supported Godfrey's decision to make Jerusalem a secular kingdom rather than one ruled by the clergy. He accompanied Godfrey in the Battle of Ascalon, with a relic of the True Cross. Arnulf enforced the Latin rite among the crusaders, banning all others thus further alienating the disaffected Greeks. However, his election was soon subject to doubts concerning its canonicity, as he was not yet a deacon. Before he could be ordained, he was replaced in December by Dagobert of Pisa, whom Pope Paschal II had appointed legate. Arnulf was instead appointed archdeacon of Jerusalem.

In 1112 he officially became patriarch, though many of the other clerics mistrusted him and found him unnecessarily harsh. He was especially unpopular with the Orthodox and Syriac Christians when he prohibited non-Latin masses at the Holy Sepulchre. He was accused of various crimes: sexual relations with a Muslim woman, simony, and most importantly condoning the bigamous marriage of King Baldwin I to Adelaide del Vasto while his first wife Arda of Armenia was still alive. He was briefly deposed by a papal legate in 1115, but appealed to Pope Paschal II and was reinstated in 1116, provided that he annul Baldwin and Adelaide's marriage.

He remained patriarch until his death in 1118.

Arnulf had his niece, Emma of Jericho, (also called Emelota), married to Eustace Garnier, the lord of Caesarea and Sidon. After her first husband's death, Emma married Hugh II of Jaffa.

Catholic Church titles
Preceded by Founder	Latin Patriarch of Jerusalem; 1099	Succeeded by Dagobert of Pisa
Preceded by Ghibbelin of Arles	Latin Patriarch of Jerusalem; 1112-1118	Succeeded by Warmund of Picquigny
