= Sidon Sea Castle =

Fortress of the Holy Land (13th Century)

- Sidon, Lebanon
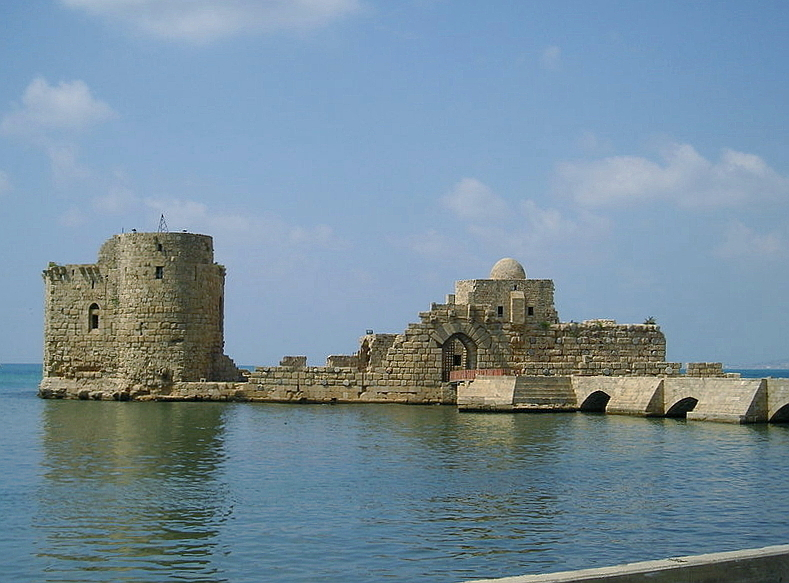
- Sidon Sea Castle, built by the Crusaders as a fortress of the Holy Land.

Site information
- Type: Castle
- Controlled by: House of Grenier

Location
- Location within Lebanon
- Coordinates: 33.567°N 35.3711°E

Site history
- Built: AD 1228
- Built by: Crusaders

Sidon's Sea Castle (Arabic: قلعة صيدا البحرية, romanized: Kalaat Saida al-Bahriya) was built by the crusaders in the thirteenth century as a fortress of the Holy Land. It is one of the most prominent historical sites in the port city of Sidon, Lebanon.

== History ==
The city of Sidon is located on the Mediterranean coast of Lebanon. This ancient Phoenician city has been of great religious, political and commercial value; it is said to be inhabited since 4000 B.C. In AD 1228, the Crusaders built Sidon's Sea Castle as a fortress on a small island connected to the mainland by a narrow 80m long roadway. The island was formerly the site of a temple to Melqart, the Phoenician version of Heracles. The beauty of the Castle can be seen in old illustrations of it; however, after bearing several wars, it has been damaged and renovated several times. It was partially destroyed by the Mamluks when they took over the city from the Crusaders, but they subsequently rebuilt it and added the long causeway. The castle later fell into disuse, but was again restored in the 17th century by Emir Fakhreddine II, only to suffer great damage.

There is a possibility that the island on which the castle is built was, in fact, the location of the Phoenician King's palace and several other Phoenician monuments which were destroyed by Esarhaddon and then by natural earthquakes. This island has also served as a shelter from inside attacks on the city. Great Sidon, Little Sidon, powerful fortresses, pastures, cisterns and fortifications are all mentioned in the Assyrian king Sennacherib's recordings of his attacks on Sidon and nearby cities.

== Description ==
Today, the castle consists primarily of two towers connected by a wall. In the outer walls, Roman columns were used as horizontal reinforcements, a feature often seen in fortifications built on or near former Roman sites. The rectangular west tower to the left of the entrance is the better preserved of the two. There is a large vaulted room scattered with old carved capitals and rusting cannonballs. A winding staircase leads up to the roof, where there is a small, domed Ottoman-era mosque. From the roof, there is a view across the old city and fishing harbor. The east tower is not as well preserved and was built in two phases; the lower part dates to the Crusader period, while the upper level was built by the Mamluks. There has also been evidence of the old Phoenician city being buried under the sea in the area surrounding the castle: structures of walls, columns, stairways, remains of buildings, statues and cisterns.

== Gallery ==
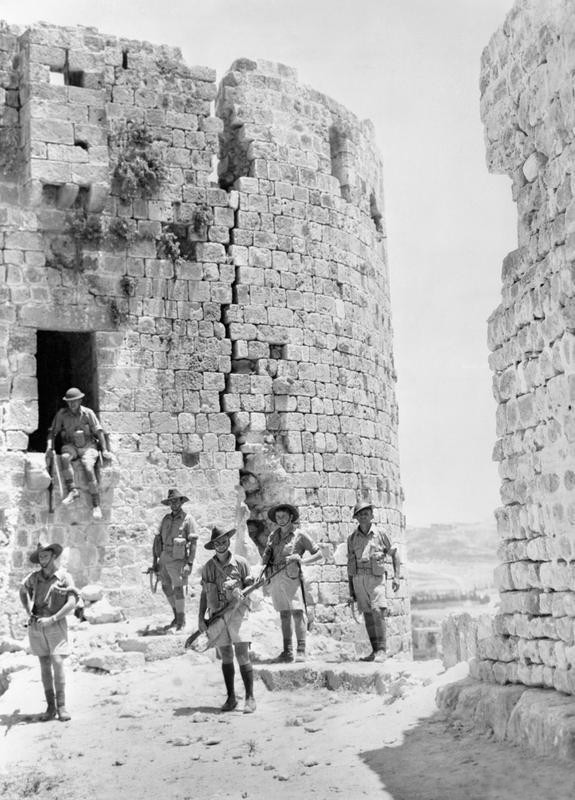
Australian troops among the ruins of the Sidon Sea Castle during the Syria-Lebanon Campaign, 1941

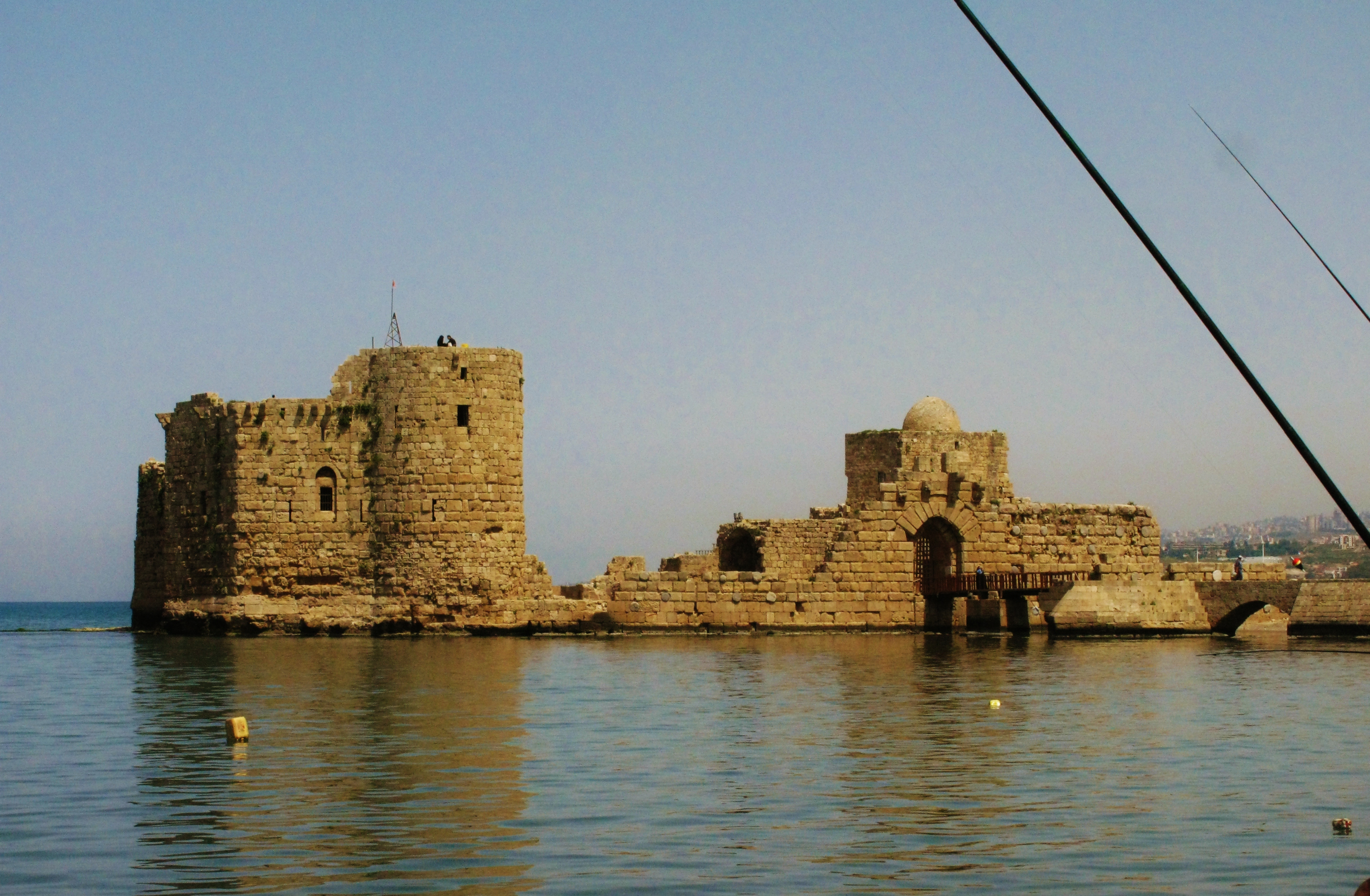
Sidon Sea Castle

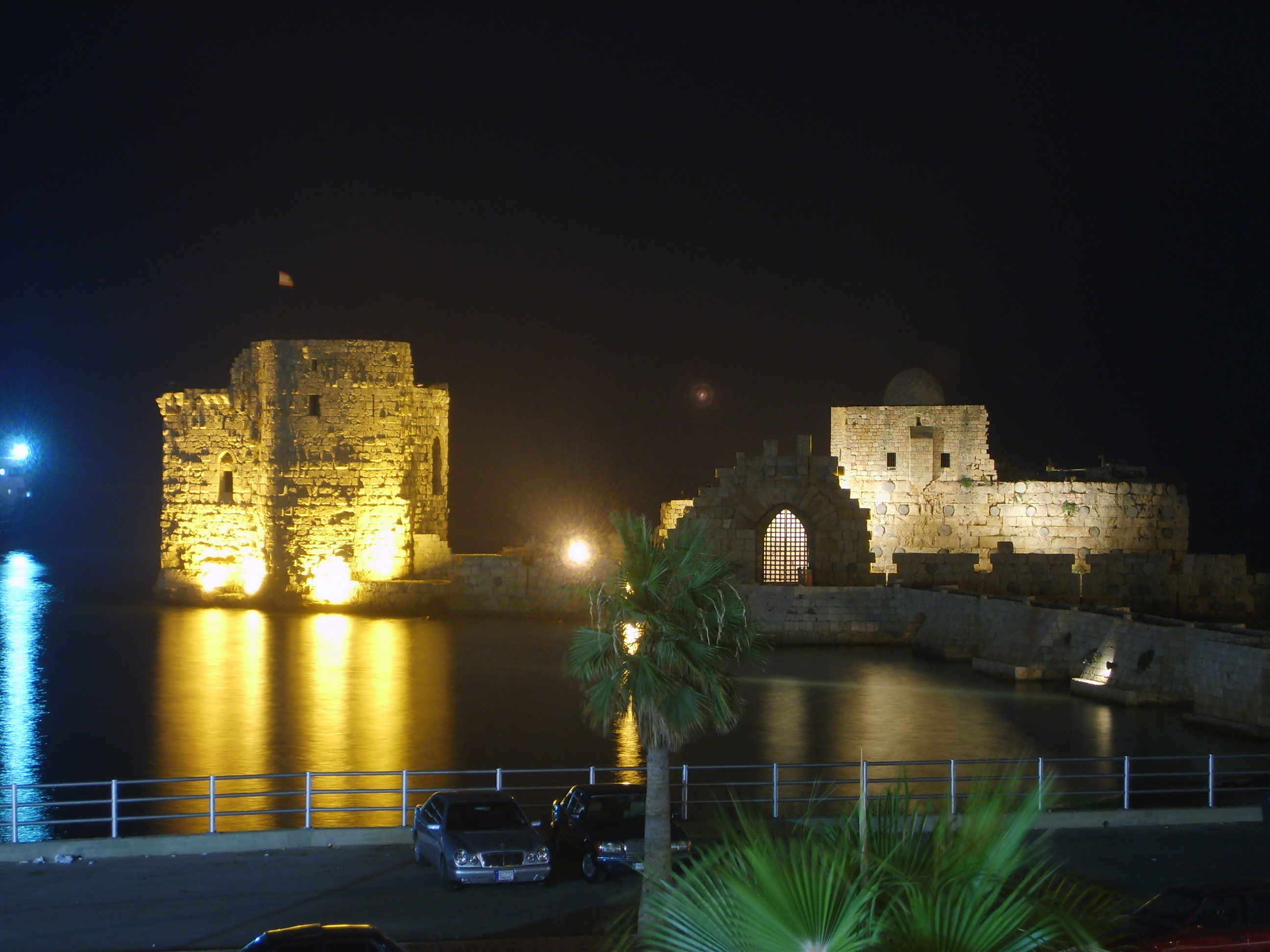
Sidon Castle at night

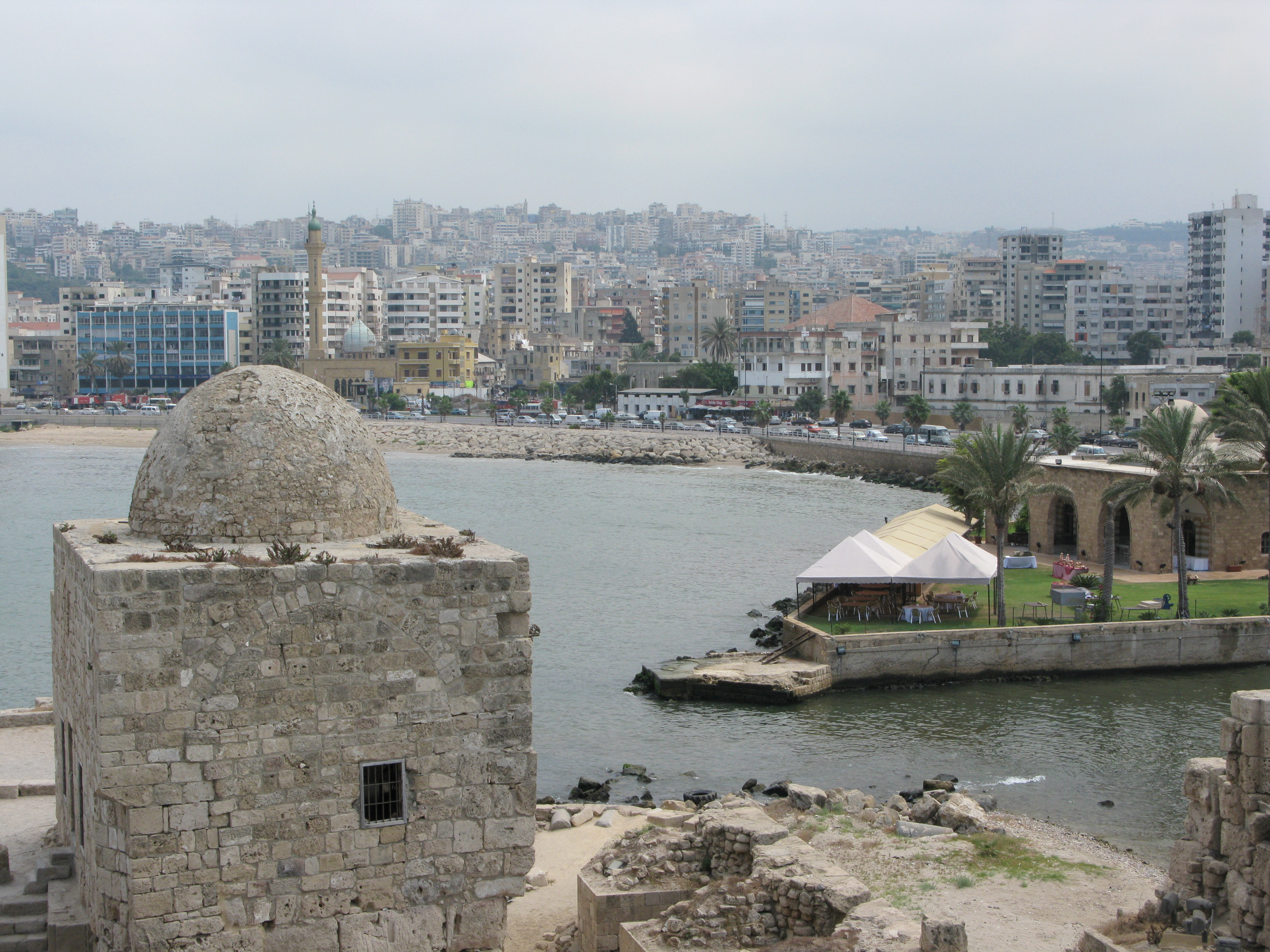

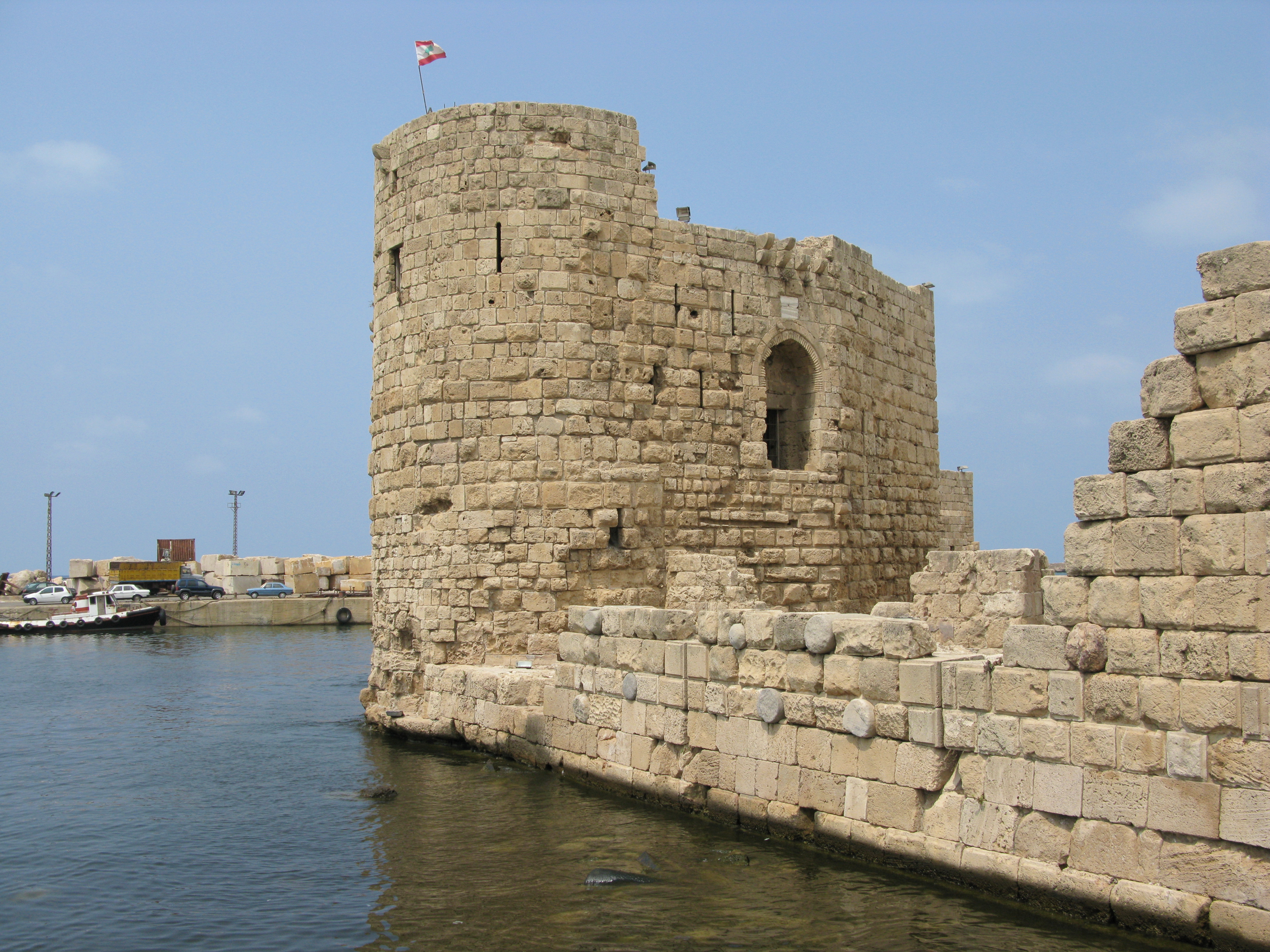

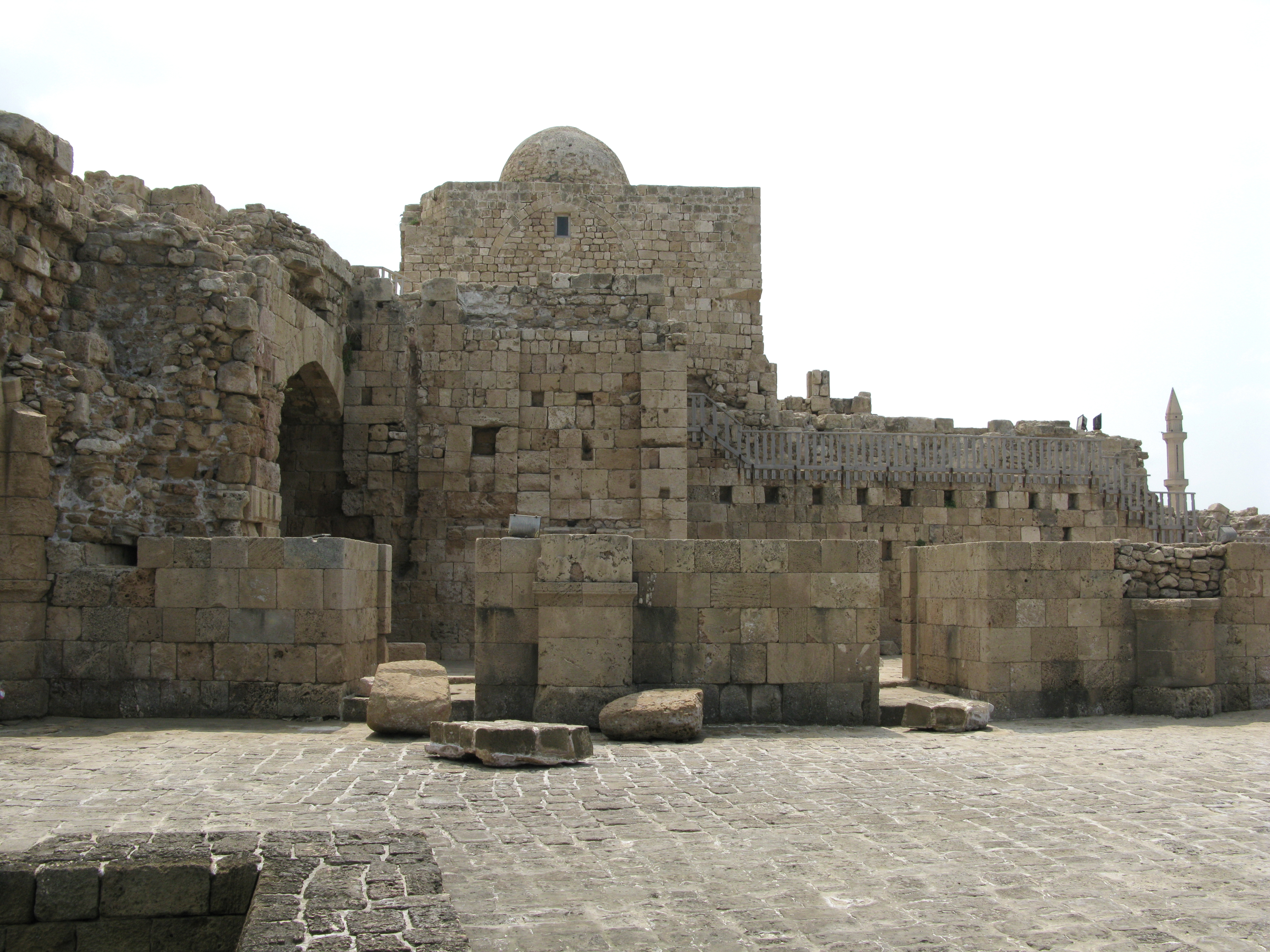

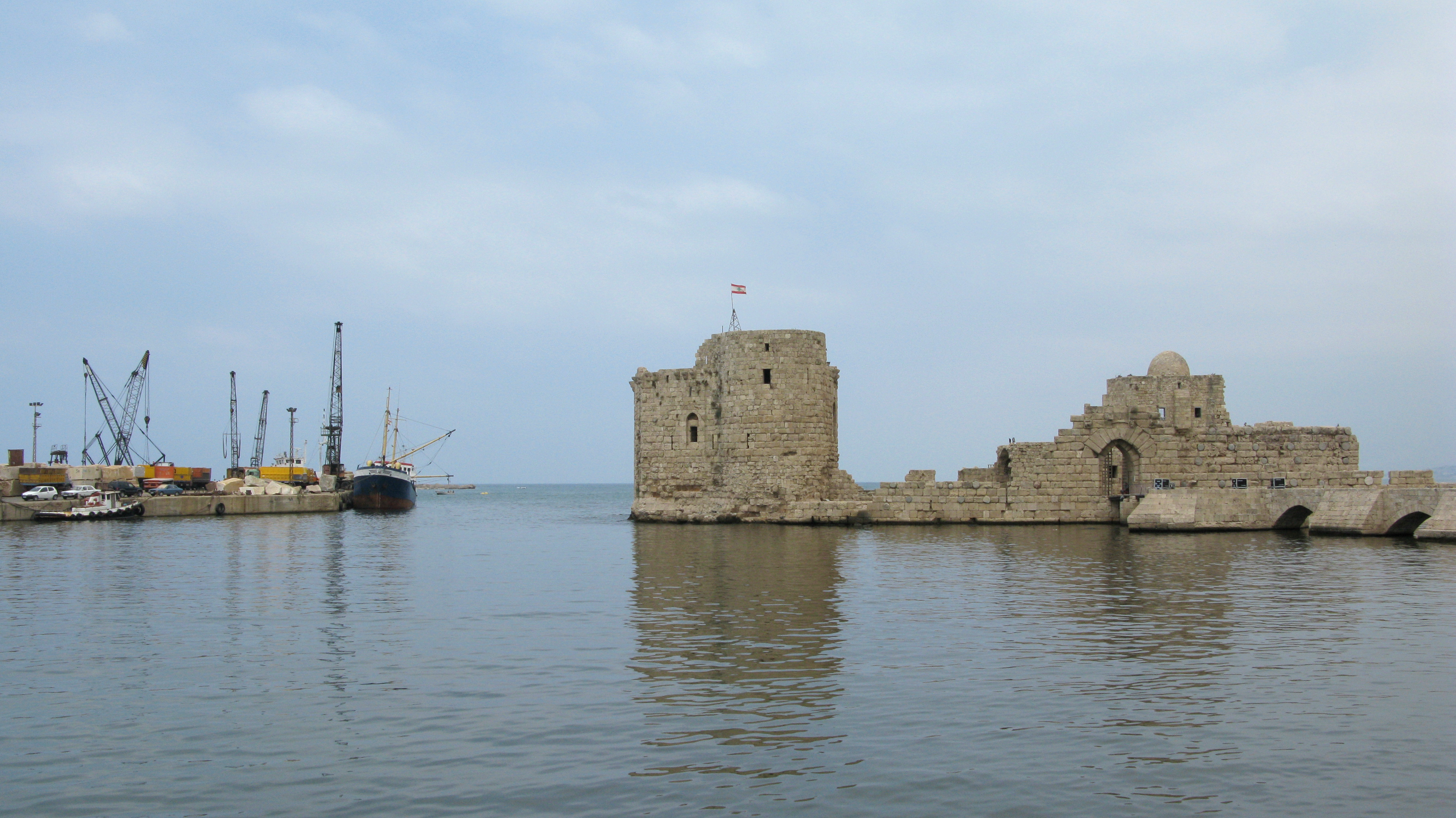

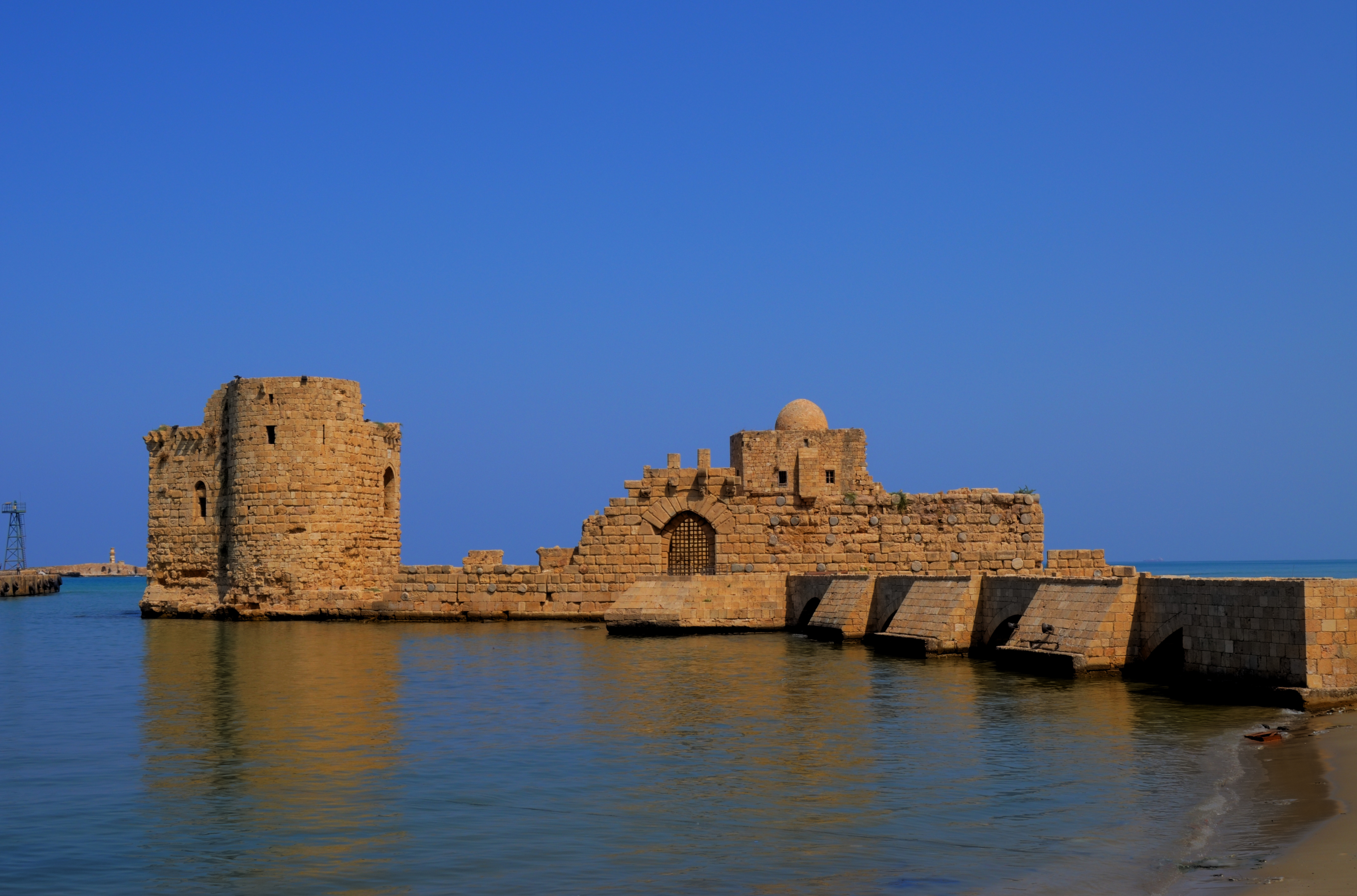

== See also ==
- List of Crusader castles
- List of Lebanese monuments
- Lordship of Sidon
