= Nouma-Hawa =

French circus performer (1845–1925)

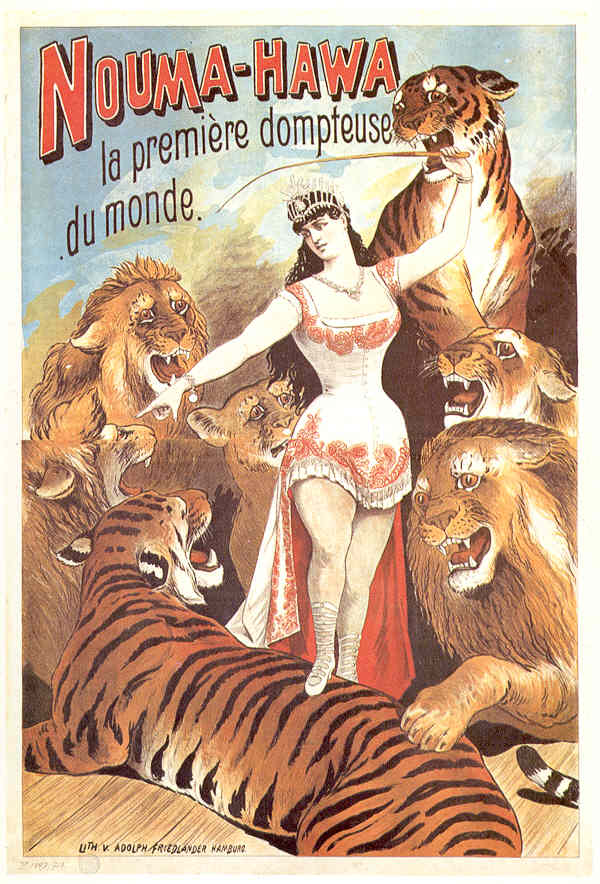
Poster of Nouma-Hawa, calling her "The world's first female lion tamer"

Marie-Louise Grenier (1845–1925), stage name Nouma-Hawa, was a French circus performer, animal trainer and circus owner for nearly 40 years during the late 19th and early 20th centuries.

== Biography ==
Marie-Louise Grenier was born in 1845 in Peaugres, France and became a laundress. She transformed into a circus star at the end of the 19th century when she became an animal trainer and snake charmer and toured in France and neighboring European countries. Eventually she became the head of her own traveling collection of animals.

During the late 1870s, Nouma-Hawa, like other male and female animal trainers, used whips and harsh methods to tame the caged wild animals that had been imported from colonized lands. In time, she started to use gentler reinforcement and got good results from the animals.

One popular poster of her illustrates a young woman posing unafraid in an almost familiar manner, which was very different from the hostile interactions of the late 1870's when she started. According to Marty, "The image is reminiscent of those of female lion tamers like Madame Morelli in Frank C. Bostock's work or the German Claire Héliot, who asserted themselves at the same time by moving among their groups—leopards or lions—as if in a classroom or a living room."

From 1900 to 1915, Nouma-Hawa performed most often in Switzerland and Italy, assisted by an old classmate, Giulio Vannuzzi. He had been trained by the American Hagenbeck brothers who ran their own circus.

Leopoldo Fregoli, an Italian actor and quick-change artist, said in his 1909 memoirs that in Bologna, Italy, she persuaded Vannuzzi, who had by then taken the pseudonym Il Signor Marcel, "to enter the cage with her to share a glass of champagne among the lions."

Nouma-Hawa died in 1925 in Geneva, Switzerland, where she had retired after selling her animals and caravans. She had chosen Geneva because audiences there had been quite generous with their applause.
