= Hugh I of Jaffa =

Crusader nobleman (fl. 1097–1112)

Hugh I (died between 1112 and 1118) was the Lord of Le Puiset (as Hugh II) from 1097 to 1106 and Count of Jaffa from 1110 until his death. He was the son of Hugh I of Le Puiset and Alice of Montlhéry. He is often confused with his son, who was also known as Hugh II of Le Puiset, though the latter was actually only Hugh II of Jaffa.

Through his mother he was a cousin of Baldwin of Le Bourg and Joscelin of Courtenay, who were lords in Outremer. Hugh acted as lord of Le Puiset until 1106 as tutor to his young nephew Hugh III. After his tenure was up, he went to the Holy Land in the company of Bohemond of Taranto and there received the county of Jaffa.

By his wife Mabel, daughter of Ebles II of Roucy and Sibylle of Hauteville, he had one son, Hugh, who succeeded to Jaffa following the regency of his mother's second husband, Albert of Namur.

== Sources ==
- La Monte, John L. (1942). "The Lords of Le Puiset on the Crusades". Speculum. 17 (1). JSTOR 2856610
