= Angèle Grenier =

Canadian maple syrup producer

- Occupation: Maple syrup producer
- Known for: Legal battles with the Federation of Quebec Maple Syrup Producers

Angèle Grenier is a Canadian maple syrup producer from Quebec who attracted international media attention for her legal battles against the Federation of Quebec Maple Syrup Producers (FPAQ). After breaking FPAQ regulations for the sale of her product, choosing to directly export her syrup to New Brunswick, she was threatened with fines and jail time, but refused to stop her actions. Grenier took her case to the Quebec Court of Appeal and finally the Supreme Court of Canada, but was ultimately unsuccessful.

== Industry background ==
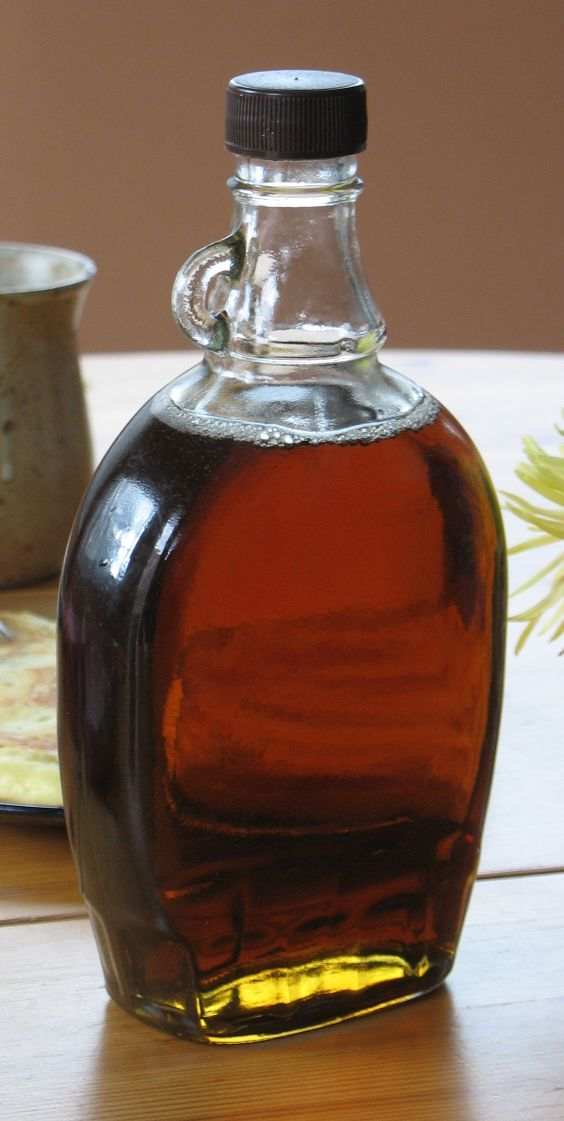
A jug of maple syrup from Quebec, Canada.

Quebec has approximately 7000 maple syrup producers, and the provincial industry supplies at least 70% of the world's maple syrup, worth over CA$600 million.

The Federation of Quebec Maple Syrup Producers (FPAQ) exerts control over virtually all aspects of the maple syrup industry in Quebec, backed by government legislation. FPAQ assigns limits on the amount of syrup producers can produce and sell directly to outside buyers, and uses its power as a collective to sell syrup to wholesalers.

Quebec maple syrup producers are obligated to sell the vast majority of their syrup directly to FPAQ, except for the small portions they can sell to visitors out of their own sugar shacks. Any producers selling their syrup in supermarkets have a 12-cents-per-pound commission taken off the top by FPAQ. In 2002, FPAQ established further regulations, assigning strict production quotas to producers and keeping all surplus syrup in its "Global Strategic Reserve" warehouses. The FPAQ pays producers in gradual installments for their syrup, and as a result producers sometimes wait years to receive full payment.

== Biography ==
Grenier and her husband own a maple syrup farm in Sainte-Clotilde-de-Beauce.

After owning and operating her maple syrup farm for several decades, unhappy with FPAQ regulations, in 2002 Grenier began selling her product in bulk directly to a buyer in New Brunswick, breaking the federation's rules on direct sales. She continued to do this for the next 12 years. In an effort to avoid the attention of the authorities, she and her family eventually resorted to loading barrels of maple syrup onto their truck under cover of darkness, driving across the provincial border before dawn.

The police and FPAQ security staff visited her farm, but Grenier refused to return to the practice of selling her syrup to the federation. She was hit with a $500,000 fine. The FPAQ finally took her to court, resulting in Grenier being ordered to hand over her product. In 2013, federation employees came to Grenier's farm and seized her barrels of syrup. In 2014, a judge ruled that inspectors could enter Grenier's farm at any time to inspect her products.

In January 2016, Grenier and a number of other dissatisfied producers took their case to the Quebec Court of Appeal, arguing that Quebec maple syrup producers should be able to sell their product independently to other provinces. In September, Grenier received support from Quebec MP Maxime Bernier, who called for an end to the federation's total control of the syrup industry.

After the Quebec courts declined her appeal, Grenier took her case to the Supreme Court of Canada, starting a crowdfunding campaign to help cover expenses. Grenier's lawyer, Hans Mercier, told press that he was prepared to work on the case for free if necessary.

In June 2017, the Supreme Court refused to hear Grenier's appeal. After three years of legal battles, Grenier had spent $150,000 on legal fees and was faced with over $300,000 in remaining fines from the FPAQ. In October 2017, she sold her sugar bush to pay both her remaining legal fees and an out-of-court settlement with the FPAQ. She told press that “It cost me a lot, but I don’t regret it... I brought attention to our problems with syrup production in Quebec.”
