= Katia Grenier =

French microwave and microfluidics engineer

Katia Grenier is a French researcher whose research combines microwave engineering and microfluidics by developing radio-frequency microelectromechanical systems for biomedical applications as sensors in microfluidics systems. She works for the French National Centre for Scientific Research (CNRS) as head of the High Frequency and Fluidic Micro and Nanosystems group (MH2F) at the Laboratory of Analysis and Architecture of System (LAAS-CNRS) in Toulouse.

== Education and career ==
Grenier was a student of electrical engineering at Toulouse III - Paul Sabatier University, where she received a master's degree in 1997. She sustained her dissertation, Conception réalisation et caractérisation de structures micro-usinées sur silicium : applications aux micro-systèmes millimétriques, in 2000 under the joint direction of Jacques Graffeuil, Patrick Pons, and Robert Plana.

After postdoctoral research at Agere Systems / Bell Labs, she became a researcher at LAAS-CNRS in 2001. She has also worked for CNRS at the Laboratory for Integrated Micromechatronic Systems (LIMMS) in Tokyo, associated with the University of Tokyo, from 2007 to 2009.

== Recognition ==
Grenier was named to the 2026 class of IEEE Fellows, "for contributions to microwave biological sensing and its application to healthcare".
