= Guy Grenier =

Lord of Caesarea, Kingdom of Jerusalem

Guy Grenier (floruit 1174–76) was the Lord of Caesarea. He was the eldest son of Lord Hugh Grenier and Isabelle (Elizabeth), daughter of John Goman. The date of his birth is unknown, though his parents are recorded as husband and wife in five charters between 1160 and 1166. He succeeded his father some time between May 1168 and July 1174, when he and his younger brother Walter II witnessed a charter of King Amalric I. Guy, with the other barons of the Kingdom of Jerusalem, signed as a witness to a charter of his step-father, Baldwin of Ibelin, in 1176.

Guy is known only from the above two charters and is not mentioned among the Greniers in the Lignages d'Outremer. His brother Walter succeeded him before 1182.

== Notes ==
Preceded by Walter I	Lord of Caesarea; 1168/74–1176/82	Succeeded by Walter II
