= Gerard Grenier =

Crusader nobleman

Gerard Grenier (French: Geraud/Gérard Grenier; died between 1165 and 1171) was a nobleman from the Kingdom of Jerusalem. He was the eldest son of Eustace Grenier and Emelota. He succeeded his father as Lord of Sidon while Walter succeeded in Caesarea. His mother married Hugh II of Jaffa, a cousin of Queen Melisende, whose relationship with the queen was suspected of being "too familiar".

For reasons unknown, William of Tyre refers to him as Eustace II. He mentions him in 1124, 1126, and 1154. He appears, however, as Gerard in several acts of the kingdom dated between 1147 and 1165. Some historians have been led to suggest that Eustace had more than two sons. He last appears witnessing a charter of 15 March 1165, but his son does not appear until 4 February 1171. The rulership of Sidon is not recorded between these years, during which Gerard must have died. It is impossible that Eustace II and Gerard should be two successive lords of Sidon.

Gerard disputed a fief with one of his vassals and tried to repossess it, but King Amalric intervened to reverse the situation in the vassal's favour. Gerard often played the pirate at sea and led several raiding expeditions against both Moslem and Christian fleets.

By his wife Agnes, sister of William II of Bures, Prince of Galilee, he had two sons:

- Reginald (c. 1133–1202), who succeeded him in Sidon, and was described in the Lignages d'Outremer as "extremely ugly but very intelligent".
- Walter (named as Eustace in the Lignages d'Outremer), b. 1137, described as "not at all clever, and handsome".

== Sources ==
- William of Tyre, A History of Deeds Done Beyond the Sea. E. A. Babcock and A. C. Krey, trans. Columbia University Press, 1943.
- Marie-Adélaïde Nielen (ed.),Lignages d'Outremer, Académie des inscriptions et belles-lettres, 1993.
- Reinhold Röhricht (ed.), Regesta Regni Hierosolymitani MXCVII-MCCXCI, and Additamentum, Berlin, 1893–1904.
