= Hans Eberhard Mayer =

German historian (1932–2023)

- Born: 2 February 1932 (age 94); Nuremberg, Free State of Bavaria, Weimar Republic
- Died: 21 October 2023 (aged 91); Klausdorf, Schleswig-Holstein, Germany

Academic background
- Education: University of Innsbruck
- Doctoral advisor: Karl Pivec

Academic work
- Discipline: History

Hans Eberhard Mayer (2 February 1932 – 21 October 2023) was a German medieval historian who specialised in the Crusades.

== Life and career ==
Mayer was born in Nuremberg on 2 February 1932. He was an international expert on the history of the Crusades. He was the Professor of Medieval and Modern History at the University of Kiel. He was elected to the American Philosophical Society in 1978. He was honored in the festschrift Montjoie: studies in Crusade history in honour of Hans Eberhard Mayer (1997).

Mayer was a member of the Monumenta Germaniae Historica between 1956 and 1967. He was a visiting fellow at the German Historical Institute in Rome in 1961. He was a visiting fellow in 1965 and visiting scholar in 1970 to Dumbarton Oaks in Washington, D.C., lecturer at the University of Innsbruck between 1964 and 1967, visiting professor at Yale University in 1971, and member of the Institute for Advanced Study in Princeton, New Jersey, between 1972 and 1973.

Mayer died in Klausdorf on 21 October 2023, at the age of 91.

== Works ==
The works of Mayer include the following.

- Bibliographie zur Geschichte der Kreuzzüge (1960). A comprehensive bibliography of the Crusades.
- Geschichte der Kreuzzüge (1968).
- Select Bibliography on the Crusades (1989). Compiled with Joyce McLellan. In Volume VI of the Wisconsin Collaborative History of the Crusades, edited by Kenneth M. Setton.
- Die Kanzlei der lateinischen Könige von Jerusalem (1996).
