= Eustace Grenier =

Lord of Caesarea, Kingdom of Jerusalem

Eustace I Garnier

Lord of Sidon
- Reign: b. 1110–1123
- Successor: Eustace II

Lord of Caesarea
- Reign: 1110–1123
- Successor: Walter
- Died: 15 June 1123
- Burial: Church of Saint Mary of the Latins, Jerusalem
- Spouse: Emma of Jericho
- Issue: Walter; Gerard (also known as Eustace II)
Names
- Eustachius Latin Granarius (Garnier)
- House: Granier or Grenier
- Religion: Roman Catholicism

Eustace I Granier, also known as Eustace Grenier or Eustace Garnier, called in Latin Eustachius Granarius in the charters (born around 1070 and died on 15 June 1123), was a Flemish crusader who took part in the First Crusade. He became lord of Caesarea in 1101, lord of Sidon in 1110, and in April 1123, was elected constable and bailiff of Jerusalem during the captivity of Baldwin II of Jerusalem. Shortly before his death, he defeated a Fatimid army at the Battle of Yibneh near Ibelin.

Grenier is a presumed member of the knights of the diocese of Thérouanne in the County of Saint-Pol who accompanied Baldwin of Boulogne to the Holy Land, as he is quoted in a text written during his life in their honour.

== Origins ==
Eustace Granier's place of origin is given by a poem in Latin, the Versus de viris illustribus diocesis Tarvanensis qui in sacra fuere expeditione ("verse about illustrious men of the diocese of Thérouanne who took part in the Holy Expedition"), written by an unknown author who was one of his contemporaries : The author writes nostris diebus ("it happened nowadays"). In this poem Eustace Grenier is cited among the knights of the Diocese of Thérouanne who accompanied Baldwin of Boulogne, the future king of Jerusalem, to the Holy Land. The author writes :
"Par Belramensis, fit princeps Caesariensis
Eustachius notus miles, cognomine Gernirs"
(Trad) :
"Peer of Belrem became prince of Caesarea
Eustace famous knight, named Garnier"

His name is given in Latin under different forms (Garnerius, Granerius, Granarius). He signed as Eustachius Garnerius, in 1110, in a deed of privilege given by Baldwin I of Jerusalem in favour of the church of Bethlehem; his name is Eustachius Granerius in a deed dated of May 5, 1116 in the Cartulary of the Holy Sepulchre, and in 1120 his signature is Eustachius Granarius, in a document signed by Baldwin II of Jerusalem.

William of Tyre, who was contemporary of Eustace Grenier, indicates him as one of the barons of Baldwin of Boulogne.

In the 16th century, Nicolas Despars (Chronicles of Flanders) and Jacques Meyer (Annals of Flanders) mention Eustace Garnier or Grenier in their lists of the Flemish knights who took an active part in the First Crusade.
Jacques Meyer in his Annals of Flanders (1561) mentions that Eustace Grenier was from the diocese of Thérouanne.

In the 16th century, Charles du Fresne, sieur du Cange writes : « I find several families with this name of Granier or Grenier in France (…) It is difficult to guess whether Eustache was originally from Aquitaine or Picardy, or even from Flanders, as Meyer wants and who gives him the nickname of Beccam, without I know why. He calls him Beccamensis, that is to say native of Beccam, place which was to be in Flanders or in the neighbouring areas, since the author notes that Godefroi of Bouillon, in the distribution of the conquered places made to the crusader barons, did not forget his compatriots. But we can’t find a town or a village called Beccam. Latin verses in honour of the characters from the diocese of Thérouanne who distinguished themselves in the First Crusade, tell us that Eustache, nicknamed Gernirs, became prince or lord of Caesarea ».

In 1865, Paul Edouard Didier Riant, writes that Eustache Grenier is "one of the Flemish vassals" of the king Baldwin I of Jerusalem.

In 1892, the abbey and historian Daniel Haigneré in Bulletin de la Société des antiquaires de la Morinie writes an article about the verse written from the time of Eustace Grenier quoting "Eustace, famous knight, named Garnier, prince of Caesarea" among the knights of the diocese of Thérouanne who accompanied Baldwin of Boulogne to the Holy Land.

Charles Moeller in Les Flamands du Ternois (1904) writes : "Among the Crusaders of the Ternois, Eustace made a great fortune, he held two of the large fiefs of the kingdom, the Lordship of Cæsarea, of which he was the first holder after its conquest in 1101 and the principality of Sidon (…) If we accept the variant Eustachii of the manuscript A [of the Versus de viris illustribus,] verse 17, we might believe he was a illegitimate son of Count Eustache (Eustachii nothus). In this case, this kinship would explain the great favor of the king, his half brother, towards him, but it is a hazardous assumption".

Contemporary sources about Eustace Grenier' origins

Joseph Ringel in Césarée de Palestine: étude historique et archéologique (1975) writes : "around 1108, the Flemish knight Eustache Granier received Caesarea in fief".

Jean Richard in The Latin Kingdom of Jerusalem (1979) writes that Eustace Garnier was from the ) and one of the most loyal companions of Baldwin I of Jerusalem.

Steven Tibble in Monarchy and Lordships in the Latin Kingdom of Jerusalem, 1099-1291 (1989) writes that Eustace Grenier is "a Flemish knight who had arrived in the Near East some time between 1099 and August 1105".

Historian Alan V. Murray in his book The Crusader Kingdom of Jerusalem: A Dynastic History 1099-1125 (2000) writes :
"However, his origins can be established with a high degree of certainty. The Versus de viris illustribus diocesis Tarvanensis qui in sacra fuere expeditione identifies him as a Fleming from the Diocese of Thérouanne." According to his analysis of the text and his research, Eustace Granier was a military official in the castle of Beaurainville in the County of Saint-Pol. He was a rear-vassal of Eustace III of Boulogne, because the counts of Saint-Pol held Beaurainville in fief from the counts of Boulogne. Eustace's surname implies that either Eustace or one of his ancestors was responsible for the management of a store-house. Alan V. Murray says, Eustace most probably came to the Holy Land in the retinue of his lord, Hugh II of Saint-Pol, during the First Crusade. Jonathan Riley-Smith writes that Eustace arrived to the Kingdom of Jerusalem after 1099.

Susan B. Edgington in Albert of Aachen (2007) agrees with this analysis. She writes that Eustace Grenier probably came from Beaurain-Château in the County of Saint-Pol.

== In the Kingdom of Jerusalem ==
=== One of the most important lords of the Kingdom of Jerusalem ===
Eustace became one of the most trusted officials of the younger brother of Eustace III of Boulogne, Baldwin I of Jerusalem. His participation in the Third Battle of Ramla in August 1105 was the first recorded event of his life in the Kingdom of Jerusalem. Baldwin appointed him and Pagan of Haifa to start negotiations with Bertrand of Toulouse, William Jordan of Cerdanya and Tancred, the regent of Antioch, about the organization of a conference where they could resolve their conflicts. The crusader leaders assembled near Tripoli and reached a compromise in June 1109. Their reconciliation enabled their united armies to force the defenders of Tripoli to surrender on 26 June.

Baldwin I granted Caesarea to Eustace before September 1110. Eustace also received Sidon, which was captured by the united forces of Baldwin I and Sigurd I of Norway on 5 December. He participated in Baldwin I's military campaigns against Shaizar in 1111. In the same year, he financed the building of siege machines during the unsuccessful siege of Tyre.

The lordships of Caesarea and Sidon and his wife's dowry made Eustace the most powerful noblemen in the entire kingdom. He also had preeminent position in the royal council. He was one of the four secular lords to attend the legislative assembly that Baldwin I's successor, Baldwin II of Jerusalem, and Warmund, Patriarch of Jerusalem held at Nablus on 16 January 1120. The assembly passed decrees that regulated the collection and spending of tithes and ordered the persecution of adultery, procuring, homosexuality, bigamy and sexual relations between Christians and Muslims.

=== Constable and Bailiff of Jerusalem ===
After The Artuqid prince Belek Ghazi captured Baldwin II on 18 April 1123. Patriarch Warmund convoked an assembly to Acre where Eustace was elected Constable of Jerusalem and Bailiff of Jerusalem to administer the kingdom during the king's captivity. Baldwin took possession of the fortress of Kharpurt where he had been held in captivity. Eustace soon sent reinforcements to Kharpurt to assist the king, but Balak ibn Bahram recaptured the fortress by the time the crusader troops reached it.

A Fatimid army invaded the kingdom from Ascalon in May 1123. Eustace attacked the invaders near Ibelin and defeated them on 29 May. He did not long survive his victory, because he died on 15 June 1123. He was buried in the Church of Saint Mary of the Latins. According to William of Tyre he was "a wise and prudent man, with great experience in military matters".

== Family ==
Eustace married Emma, the niece of Arnulf of Chocques, the Latin patriarch of Jerusalem. Arnulf gave Jericho to Eustace as Emma's dowry, although the town had been the property of the Church of the Holy Sepulchre.

With Emma, Eustace was the father of the twins, Gerard (also known as Eustace II) and Walter, who succeeded him in Sidon and Caesarea respectively. Emma married Hugh II of Le Puiset, Count of Jaffa. The relationship between her second husband and her sons was tense.

His descendant Julian Grenier sold the Lordship of Sidon to the Knights Templar after it was destroyed by the Mongols in 1260 after the Battle of Ain Jalut.

His descendants continued to rule the Lordship of Caesarea until it became the property of John Aleman by right of his marriage to Margaret Grenier in 1238 or 1243.

The Granier or Grenier family became extinct with two brothers : Balian II (who died at Botron in 1277) and John (who died in Armenia in 1289), they were the sons of Julian Grenier (died in 1275), lord of Sidon and his wife Euphemia, daughter of Hethum I, King of Armenia.

== Sources ==
- Murray, Alan V. (2000). The Crusader Kingdom of Jerusalem: A Dynastic History, 1099–1125. Prosopographica et Geneologica. ISBN 978-1-9009-3403-9.
- Haigneré (abbey), Daniel (1892). Les hommes illustres du diocèse de Thérouanne qui après la première Croisade furent au nombre des dignitaires de la terre sainte in Bulletin de la Société des antiquaires de la Morinie, pages 471-490). Société des antiquaires de la Morinie.
- Moeller, Charles (1904). Les Flamands du Ternois (in Mélanges Paul Frédéricq: hommage de la Société pour le progrès des études philologiques et historiques). Société pour le progrès des études philologiques et historiques, Brussels.
- Barber, Malcolm (2012). The Crusader States. Yale University Press. ISBN 978-0-300-11312-9.
- Lock, Peter (2006). The Routledge Companion to the Crusades. Routledge. ISBN 9-78-0-415-39312-6.
- Riley-Smith, Jonathan (1973). The Feudal Nobility and the Kingdom of Jerusalem, 1174-1277. Macmillan.
- Runciman, Steven (1989). A History of the Crusades, Volume II: The Kingdom of Jerusalem and the Frankish East, 1100-1187. Cambridge University Press. ISBN 0-521-06163-6.

Preceded by Hugh Caulis	Constable of Jerusalem; 1123	Succeeded by William I of Bures
Preceded by none	Lord of Caesarea aft. 1101–1123	Succeeded by Walter I
Preceded by none	Lord of Caesarea; 1111–1123	Succeeded by Eustace II
