= Lordship of Sidon =

Fiefdom in the Kingdom of Jerusalem

Lordship (County) of Sidon
- 1110–1268
- Coat of arms of the House of Grenier
- Status: Vassal of Kingdom of Jerusalem
- Capital: Sidon
- Common languages: Latin, Old French, Italian (also Arabic and Greek)
- Religion: Roman Catholicism, Greek Orthodoxy, Syriac Orthodoxy, Islam, Judaism
- Government: Feudal monarchy
- Lord/Count
  - 1110–1123: Eustace I Grenier
  - 1239–1260: Julian Grenier
- Historical era: High Middle Ages
  - First Crusade: 1110
  - Conquered by Baibars: 1268
Preceded by	Succeeded by
Fatimid Caliphate	Mamluk Sultanate

The Lordship of Sidon (French: Saete/Sagette), later County of Sidon, was one of the four major fiefdoms of the Kingdom of Jerusalem, the most prominent of the four Crusader states. However, in reality, it appears to have been much smaller than the others and had the same level of significance as several neighbors, such as Toron and Beirut, which were sub-vassals.

Sidon was captured in December, 1110 during the Norwegian Crusade and given to Eustace I Grenier. The lordship was a coastal strip on the Mediterranean Sea between Tyre and Beirut. It was conquered by Saladin in 1187 and remained in Muslim hands until it was restored to Christian control by German Crusaders in the Crusade of 1197. Julien Grenier sold it to the Knights Templar after it was destroyed by the Mongols in 1260 before the Battle of Ain Jalut. One of the vassals of the lordship was the Lordship of the Shuf.

== Rulers of Sidon ==
- Eustace I Grenier (1110–1123)
- Gerard Grenier (1123–1171)
- Renaud Grenier (1171–1187, titular from then)
- Conquered by Saladin, 1187–1197
- Renaud Grenier (restored, 1197–1202)
- Balian I Grenier (1202–1239)
- Julian Grenier (1239–1260, titular from then)
- Sold to the Knights Templar (1260)
- Julian Grenier (titular, 1260–1275)
- Balian II Grenier (titular, 1275–1277)

=== Lordship of the Schuf ===
The Schuf was created out of the Lordship of Sidon as a vassal around 1170. It was centred on the Cave of Tyron. Julian of Sidon sold it to the Teutonic Knights in 1256.

- Andrew of Schuf (13th century)
- John of Schuf (13th century)
- Julian of Sidon (mid 13th century)

== See also ==
- Sidon Sea Castle
- Vassals of the Kingdom of Jerusalem

== Bibliography ==
- John L. La Monte, Feudal Monarchy in the Latin Kingdom of Jerusalem, 1100-1291. The Medieval Academy of America, 1932.
- Jonathan Riley-Smith, The Feudal Nobility and the Kingdom of Jerusalem, 1174-1277. The Macmillan Press, 1973.
- Steven Runciman, A History of the Crusades, Vol. II: The Kingdom of Jerusalem and the Frankish East, 1100-1187. Cambridge University Press, 1952.
- Steven Tibble, Monarchy and Lordships in the Latin Kingdom of Jerusalem, 1099-1291. Clarendon Press, 1989.
