= Butchers' market (Jerusalem) =

Meat market in the old city of Jerusalem

Butchers' Market
- Suq al-Lahamin
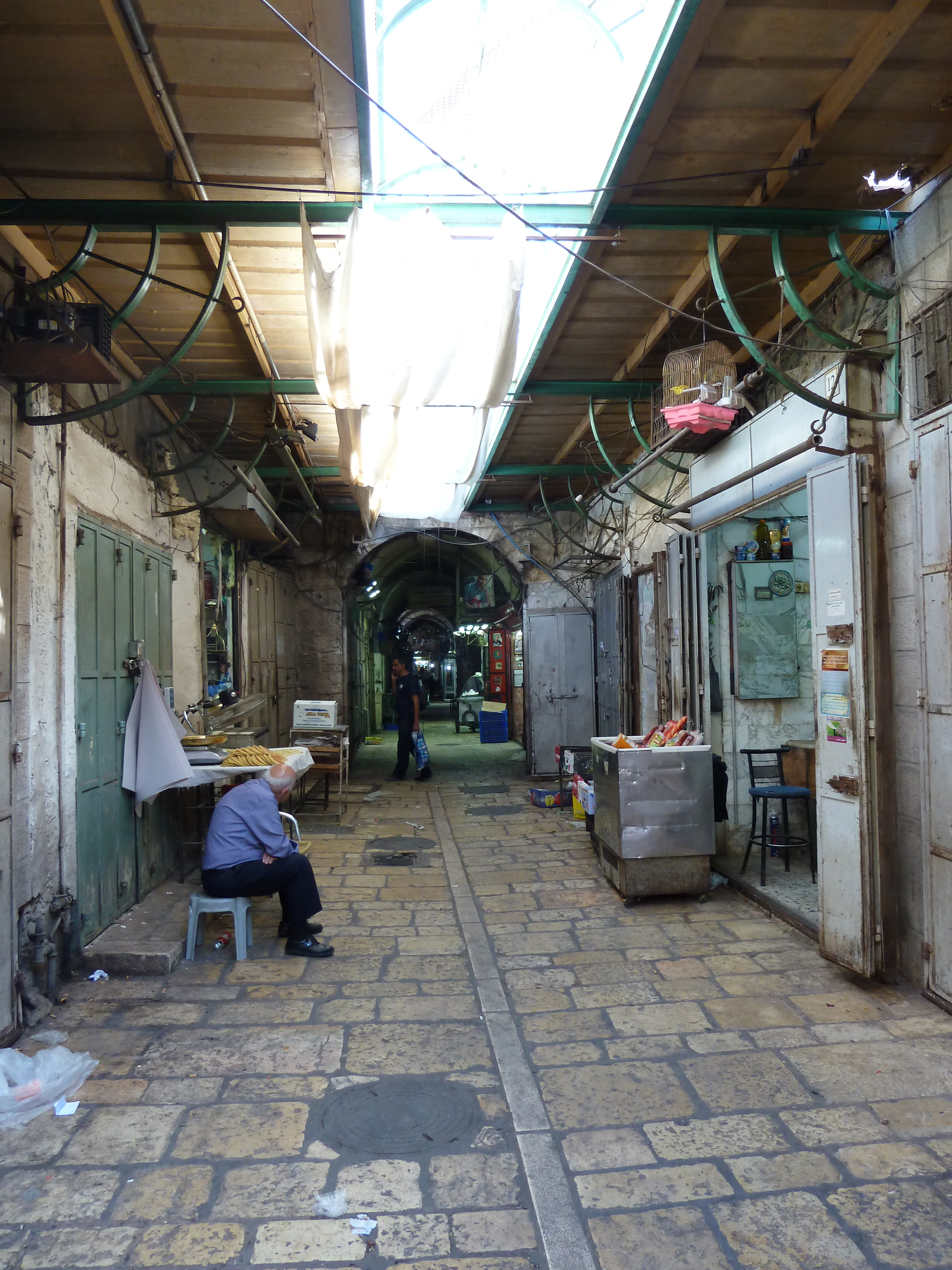
- The northern entrance to the butchers' market, a butcher shop is seen on the right.
- Native name: سوق اللحامين (Arabic)
- Namesake: Butcher shops
- Length: 125 m (410 ft)
- Width: 3.71m
- Quarter: Muslim Quarter
- North: Suq Khan az-Zait
- East: Perfumers' Market
- West: Arab Souk (Old City)

Construction
- Completed: 1152 AD

The butchers' market (Arabic: سوق اللحامين, romanized: sūq al-laḥḥāmīn, also known as Suq al-Lahamin) is a meat market in the old City of Jerusalem with 100 shops that historically worked as butchers. Its construction dates back to the Crusader rule of Jerusalem, though initially not as a meat market.

== Location ==
The market starts from the eastern side of suq al-bazar and continues northwards the southern end of suq Khan az-Zait. It is part of the Crusader-era "Triple market", situated on the west-most side of the triple market, with the Perfumers' Market on its east.

== Shops ==
A 83 shops are found in the market, 41 on the western side and 42 on the eastern side. Despite the name, many of the shops are not butcher shops. The market has been described as "smelly" due to the abundance of butcher shops, reportedly detering some locals from visiting.

== Architecture ==
The vaulted roof of the market is 6.1 meters of the ground, the vaults are groin vaults resting on pointed arches. The construction material for the street, vaults, and arches is Turonian limestone. The markets roof rests on 28 columns.

== History ==
The street itself that the market is built on dates back to c. 70 AD, during the Roman rule of Jerusalem, the street remained a single road during the Byzantine period. It is disputed when exactly the street was turned into a meat market.

In 1891, the market was described by J. E. Hanauer in the Palestine Exploration Fund's Quarterly Statement as containing a series of limestone columns embedded into the eastern side of the market's shops. Hanauer identified seven columns aligned north-to-south, which he suggested were remains of a Byzantine colonnaded street or agora that once crossed Jerusalem from north to south.

=== Crusader period ===
The "Triple market", of which the butchers' market makes the western market, was established in 1152 by Queen Melisende of Jerusalem. It was a collection of three street markets adjacent to one another, arranged east to west along the Cardo. It was initially named the "Street of Herbs" (Rue des Herbes), and sold herbs, fruits, and spices. According to historian Meron Benvenisti, "In the Herb Market [...] fresh foodstuffs were sold, such as fish, eggs, poultry[,] cheese[,] condiments[,] and fruit. [...] The shopkeepers of the market were Franks and Syrians who lived side-by-side and commingled."

=== Ottoman period ===
According to historian Amnon Cohen, Jerusalem had no centralized meat market during the 16th century, and butchers were not cetralized into a single area, they were scattered across several markets, such as the Perfumers' Market.

In the early 19th century, Orientalist Charles Warren described the market in his writing: "In the Suk Lahamen are the Moslem cooks, meat-cutters, meat-fryers, and butchers."

According to historian Bashir Barakat, the Coppersmith' market (Arabic: سوق النحّاسين) of Jerusalem was moved into the northern portion of the butchers' market in 1860, he further stated that the copper plates used in the gates to the Qibli Mosque and the Dome of the Rock were made in that market. Arif al-'Arif mentioned the presence of the coppersmiths' market in 1947, located north of the butchers' market and south of suq Khan az-Zait. According to Wafa, the coppersmiths' market was eventually merged into the butchers' market.

=== Post-1967 ===
Historian Meron Benvenisti's 1970 account asserted that the Crusader vaults and shops have been preserved, but that the pavement and store fronts were "altered beyond recognition".

The market has been described as declining in economic activity in the 21st century. In 2016, an Al Jazeera Arabic titled "The butchers' market draws its last breaths" reported that 68 of the markets 100 were closed. Reasons such as increased taxes, chiefly the Arnona tax, as well as shop owners relocating to more favorable locations, like Musrara.

A 1987 survey of 60 shop owners from the market found 2 whose families were occupying the same shop for more than 120 years, and counted 13 of the 81 shops working as butchers, with 10 of the 81 being permanently closed.

In 2023, 16 shops in the market were renovated and returned to operation with funding provided by the Kuwait Chamber of Commerce and Industry, the initiative was estimated to cost ~300,000 USD (81802.39 NIS). In 2025 Al Jazeera Arabic reported again that the market was "dying", citing rising taxes.

== Gallery ==
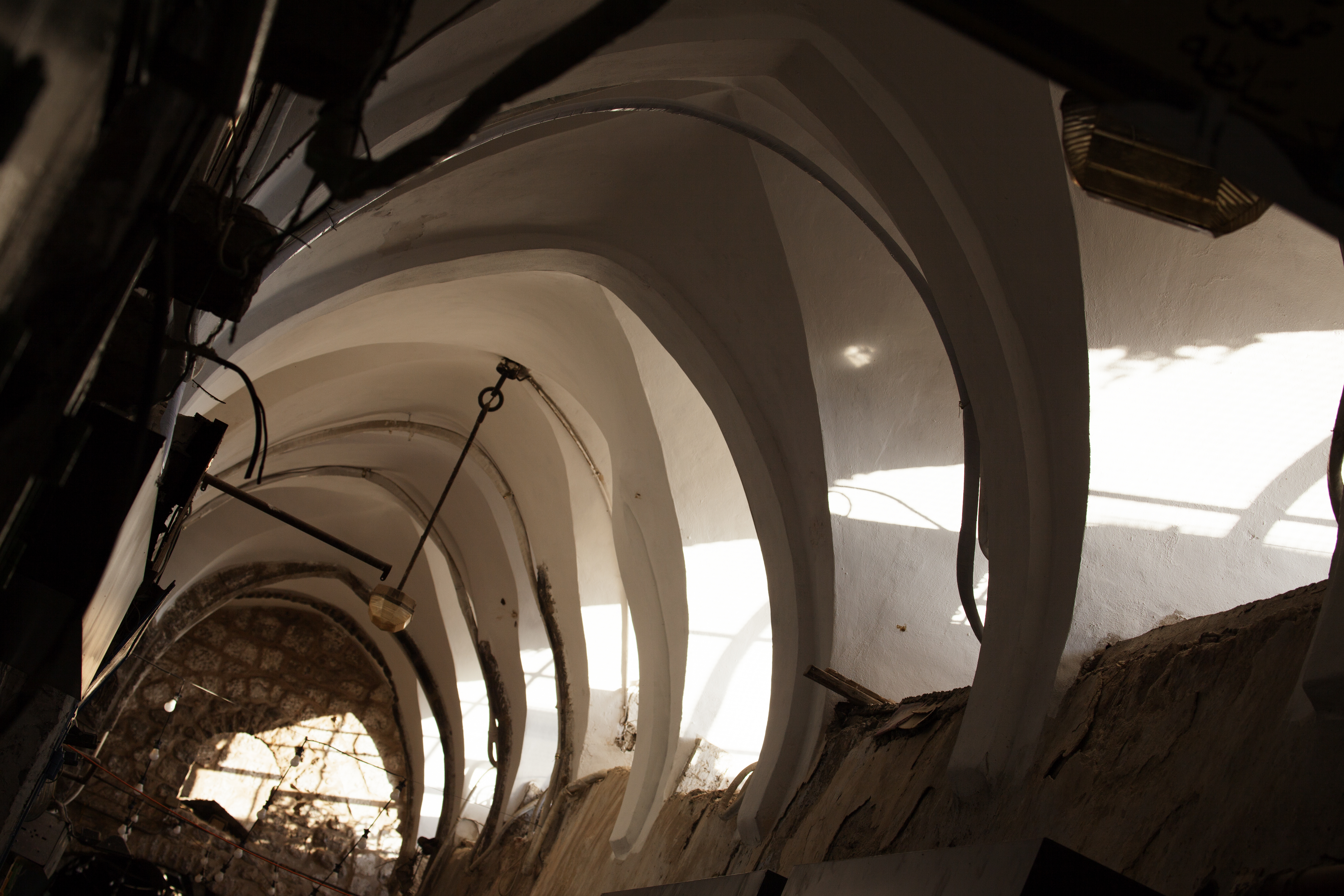
The vaulted ceiling of the market.

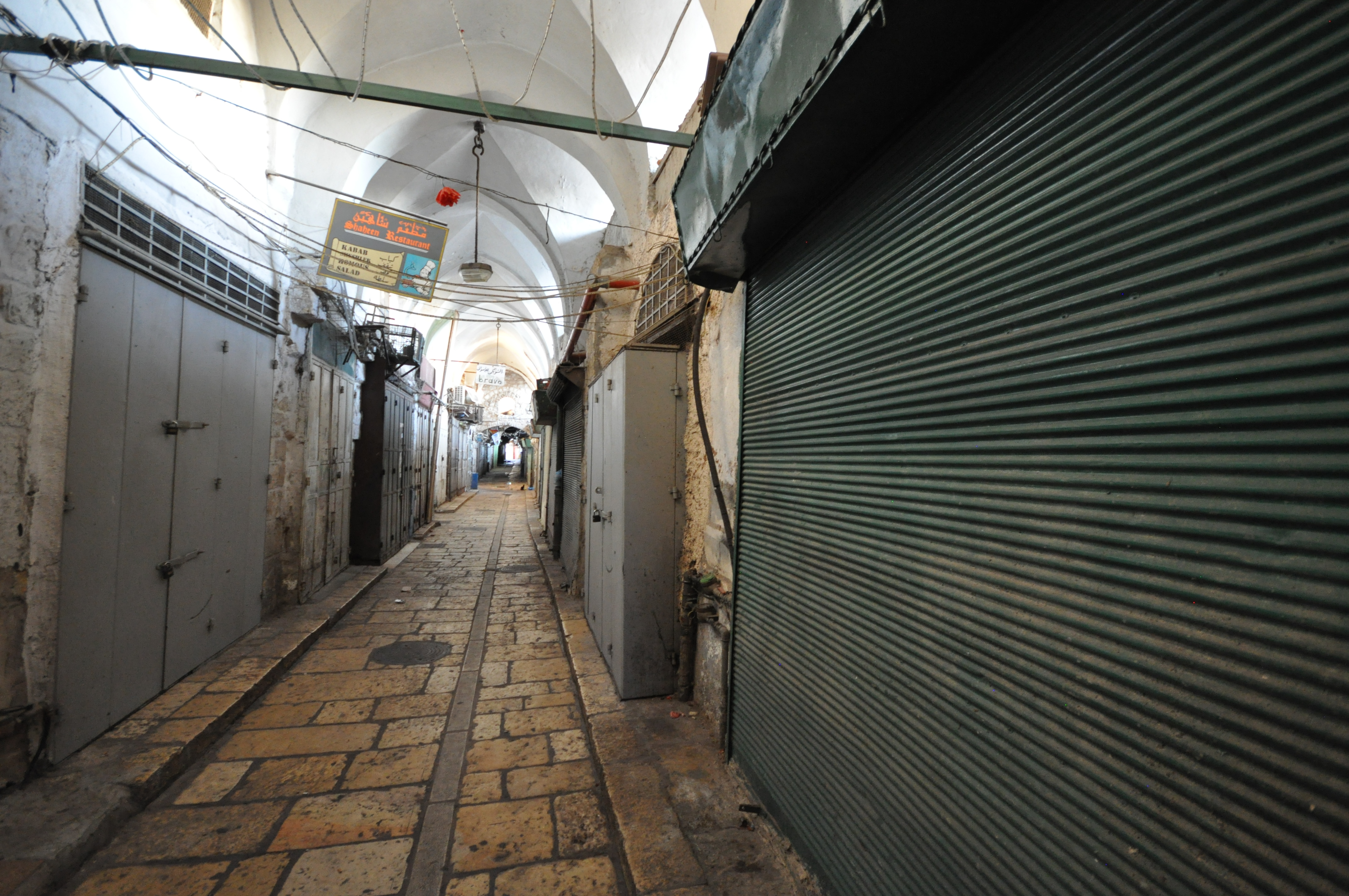
The market with shops closed, 2012

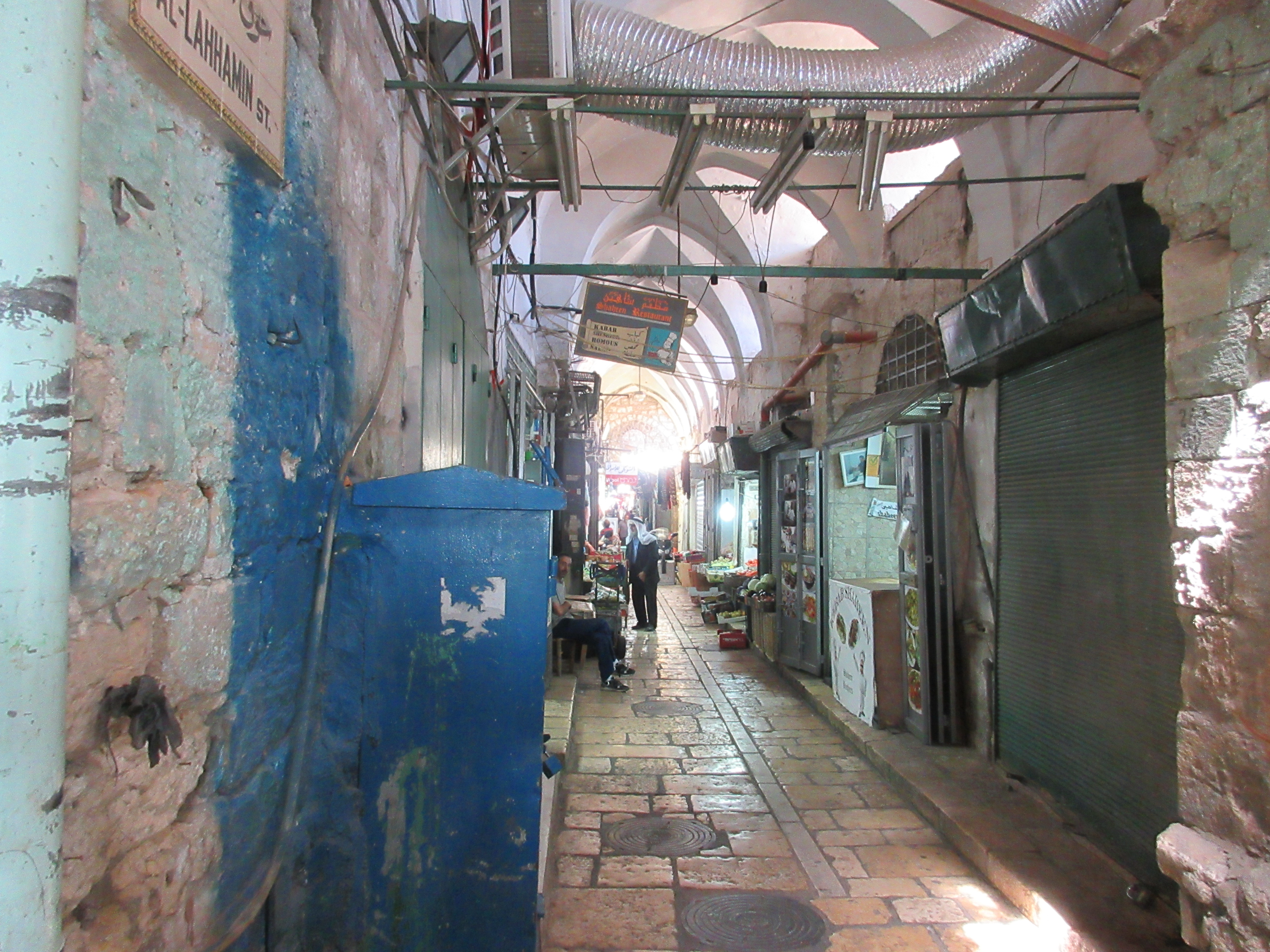
The street with some shops open, 2016, a sign with the street's name in 3 languages is seen on the left.

== See also ==
- List of bazaars in Palestine and Israel
- Khan el-Khalili – Major souk in Cairo
- List of bazaars and souks
