= List of bazaars in Palestine and Israel =

List of Souks in Israel and Palestine

A bazaar or souk, is a marketplace consisting of multiple small stalls or shops, and often they serve as a city's main marketplace.

The term bazaar originates from Persian, where it referred to a town's public market district.

The term souk (Arabic: سوق suq, Hebrew: שוק shuq, Classical Syriac: ܫܘܩܐ shuqa, Armenian: շուկա shuka, Spanish: zoco, also spelled souq, shuk, shooq, soq, esouk, succ, suk, sooq, suq, soek) is used in Western Asian, North African and some Horn African cities (Amharic: ሱቅ sooq).

== List of Bazaars in Palestine and Israel ==
Name	Location	Picture	# of shops	Notes
Arab Souk (Old City)	Old City of Jerusalem			Arab Souk (Old City) is a large bazaar occupying approximately 100 acres (400,000 m^{2}) of area in the Old City of Jerusalem.
Mahane Yehuda Market	Jerusalem			The Mahane Yehuda Market, Shuk Mahane Yehuda), often referred to as "The Shuk" (Hebrew: השוק, HaShuq), is a marketplace (originally open-air, but now partially covered) in Jerusalem. Popular with locals and tourists alike, the market's more than 250 vendors
Old City Nablus Market	Nablus Governorate, West Bank			The Old City Nablus Market is in the West Bank and has Several leather tanneries, souks, pottery and textile workshops line the Old City streets.
Old City of Hebron	Hebron Governorate, West Bank			The Old City of Hebron in the West Bank Avraham Avinu quarter was established next to the Vegetable and Wholesale Markets on Al-Shuhada Street in the south of the Old City. The vegetable market was closed by the Israeli military.
Old City Market Bethlehem	West Bank			The Old City of Hebron in the West Bank, the city's main streets and old markets are lined with shops selling Palestinian handicrafts, Middle Eastern spices, jewelry and oriental sweets such as baklawa.
Old City of Nazareth Bazaar	Northern District of Israel			The Old City of Nazareth Bazaar in the Northern District of Israel is a market where locals and tourists shop side by side. The market has clothing, food and many other items.
Suq Khan az-Zait	Old City of Jerusalem		108	One of the main arteries of the old city of Jerusalem, houses a variety of shops.
Suq al-Hasr	Old City of Jerusalem		8	The smallest market in the city, historically specialized in selling carpets and woven baskets. As of the 2010s, most of the shops are not active.
Butchers' market (Jerusalem)	Old City of Jerusalem		83	Historically specialized in selling meat products, part of the triple market established by the Crusader Melisende, Queen of Jerusalem in 1152.
Perfumers' Market	Old City of Jerusalem		77	Historically specialized in housing apothecaries and spice shops, part of the triple market established by the Crusader Melisende, Queen of Jerusalem in 1152.
Cotton Merchants' Market	Old City of Jerusalem			Historically specialized in the trade of cotton.
Al-Wad Street	Old City of Jerusalem			Connected to Damascus Gate.
Goldsmiths' Market	Old City of Jerusalem		32	Historically specialized in the trade of gold. Al Jazeera Arabic reported in 2017 that 20 of the 32 shops had closed. It is part of the "triple market" established by the Crusaders. The 1927 Jericho earthquake caused significant damaged to the markets sites.

== See also ==
- Khan el-Khalili
- List of bazaars and souks
