= Governor Borton =

Governor Borton may refer to:

- Arthur Borton (British Army general) (1814–1893), Governor of Malta from 1878 to 1884
- Neville Travers Borton (1870–1938), Military Governor of Jerusalem in 1917
