= Cotton Merchants' Market =

Market in the old city of Jerusalem

Cotton Merchant's Market
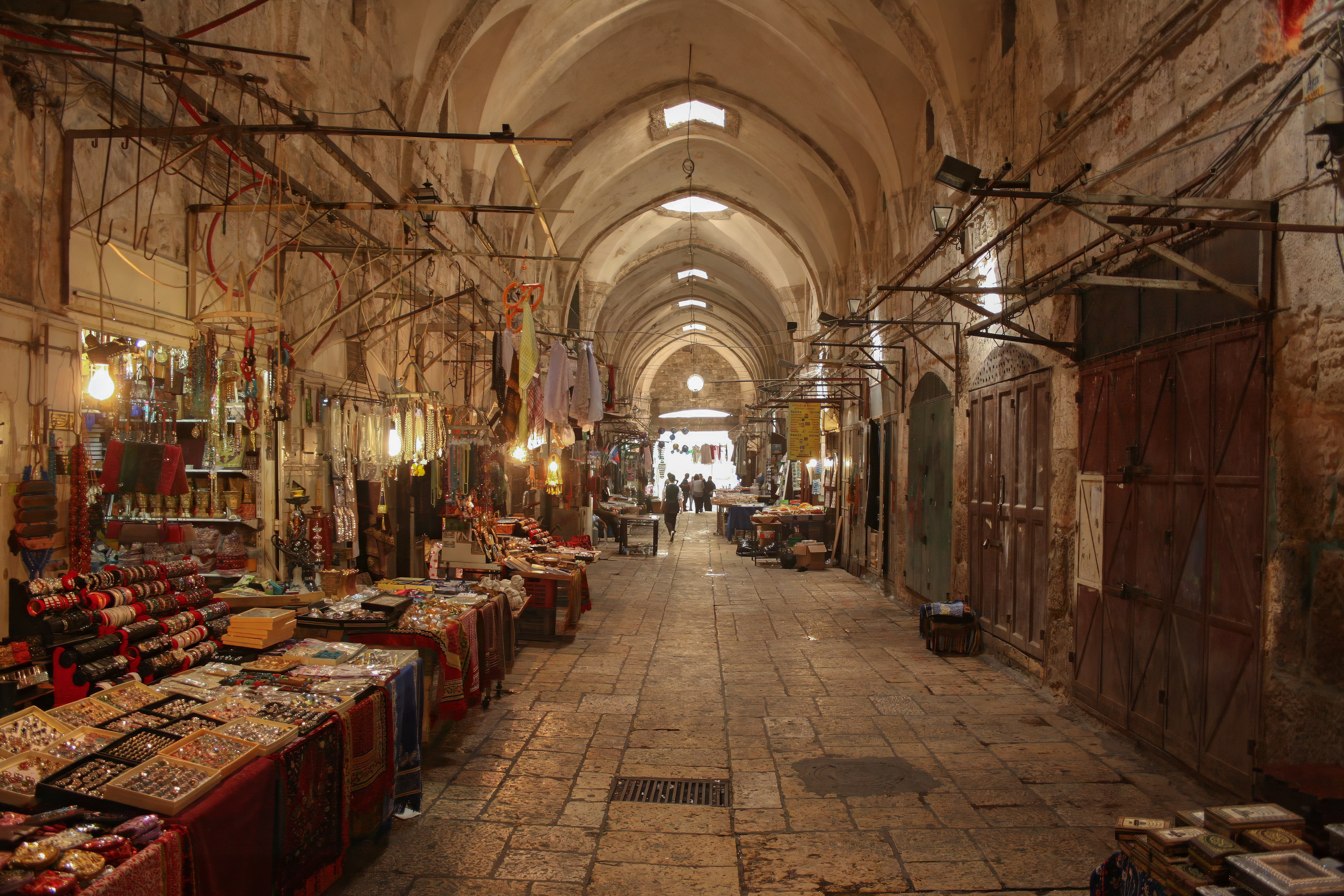
- The market in 2011
- Interactive map of Cotton Merchant's Market
- Native name: سوق القطانين (Arabic)
- Maintained by: Jerusalem Waqf
- Length: 94.5 metres (310 ft)
- Width: 5.5 metres (18 ft)
- Quarter: Muslim Quarter
- From: Al-Wad Street
- To: Cotton Merchants' Gate, Al-Aqsa
- North: Al-Khatuniyya Madrasa (Jerusalem)
- East: Al-Aqsa
- West: Al-Wad street

Construction
- Construction start: 1329
- Completed: 1337

Other
- Known for: Cotton trade

The Cotton Merchant's Market (Arabic: سوق القطانين, romanized: Sūq al-Qaṭṭānīn) is a souk in the Old City of Jerusalem. The market primarily traded cotton during the Ottoman rule of Palestine, hence the name. The modern-day structure was commissioned in 1329 during the Mamluk period and completed in 1337, though artifacts dating back to the Crusader period can be found. The construction was commissioned by Tankiz; then governor of Mamluk Syria.

== Name ==
Although the market historically traded cotton, in the 21st century, it pivoted to trading perfumes, religious items, and clothing. It is especially busy after prayers conclude. The name "Cotton Merchants' Market" has been in used since the 15th century, though some 13th century references to the market call it al-qayṣarīyah. It may be romanized as "al-Qattanin market". The word qaṭṭān (قَطّان) means cotton merchant in Arabic.

== Architecture ==
A floor plan of the market

The market is an instance of Mamluk architecture. The alley is dimly lit, with 6 holes in the ceiling of the structure to allow sunlight in. A set of transverse arches are found along the length of the alley. The market street is continuously barrel vaulted.

== Sites ==
- Al-Shifa bathhouse: Al-Shifa bathhouse (Arabic: حمام الشفاء) is one of 2 bathhouses in the old city of Jerusalem. It was constructed in 1336 by Tankiz.
- Khan Tankiz: Khan Tankiz (Arabic: خان تنكيز, lit. 'Tankiz Inn') is an inn found within the market, constructed in 737 AH (1336/1337 CE) by Mamluk prince Tankiz. Since 1994, the inn has been used by Al-Quds University.

== History ==
16th century chronicler Mujir al-Din mentioned an inscription crediting the markets renewal to Qalawun in 737 AH (1336/1337 CE).

=== Ottoman period ===
The cotton merchants market in Jerusalem was one of the few major cotton markets in Palestine during the 16th century.

Also in the 16th century, sūq al-qaṭṭānīn, then one of Jerusalem's principal commercial centers and part of the Haram al-Sharif endowment, underwent extensive restoration after decades of neglect dating back to the late Mamluk period. The market complex, which included a large courtyard, storage depots, and multi-story shops, was reportedly partially deserted by the time of the Ottoman conquest. Starting in 1544, repairs included the clearing accumulated waste, installing new doors and gates, among other structural improvements. Further renovations continued in subsequent decades, accompanied by commercial expansion; between 1564 and 1566, the number of shops at the market entrance was increased from 28 to 32. Contemporary records also indicate a 4-fold rise in rental income, reflecting increased trade activity in the market under Ottoman rule.

=== British Mandate ===
In 1937, the governor of Jerusalem, Ronald Storrs, wrote about the market's neglect under the Ottomans in his diary:

[The suq] had degenerated through neglect into a public latrine. The shops were filled with ordure, the debris was sometimes lying five feet high, and the picturesque doors had been broken up for firewood by the Turks. We restored the vaults, roofing, and the walls of the Suq, put in looms, and by the close of the first year were employing, on a self-supporting basis, some seventy people.

The market was renovated under Storrs and British architect Charles Robert Ashbee, with help from the Pro-Jerusalem Society, which was founded by Storrs.

=== 21st century ===
In 2024, during the Jerusalem Day march, Jewish Israelis stormed al-Aqsa Mosque through the market.

== Gallery ==
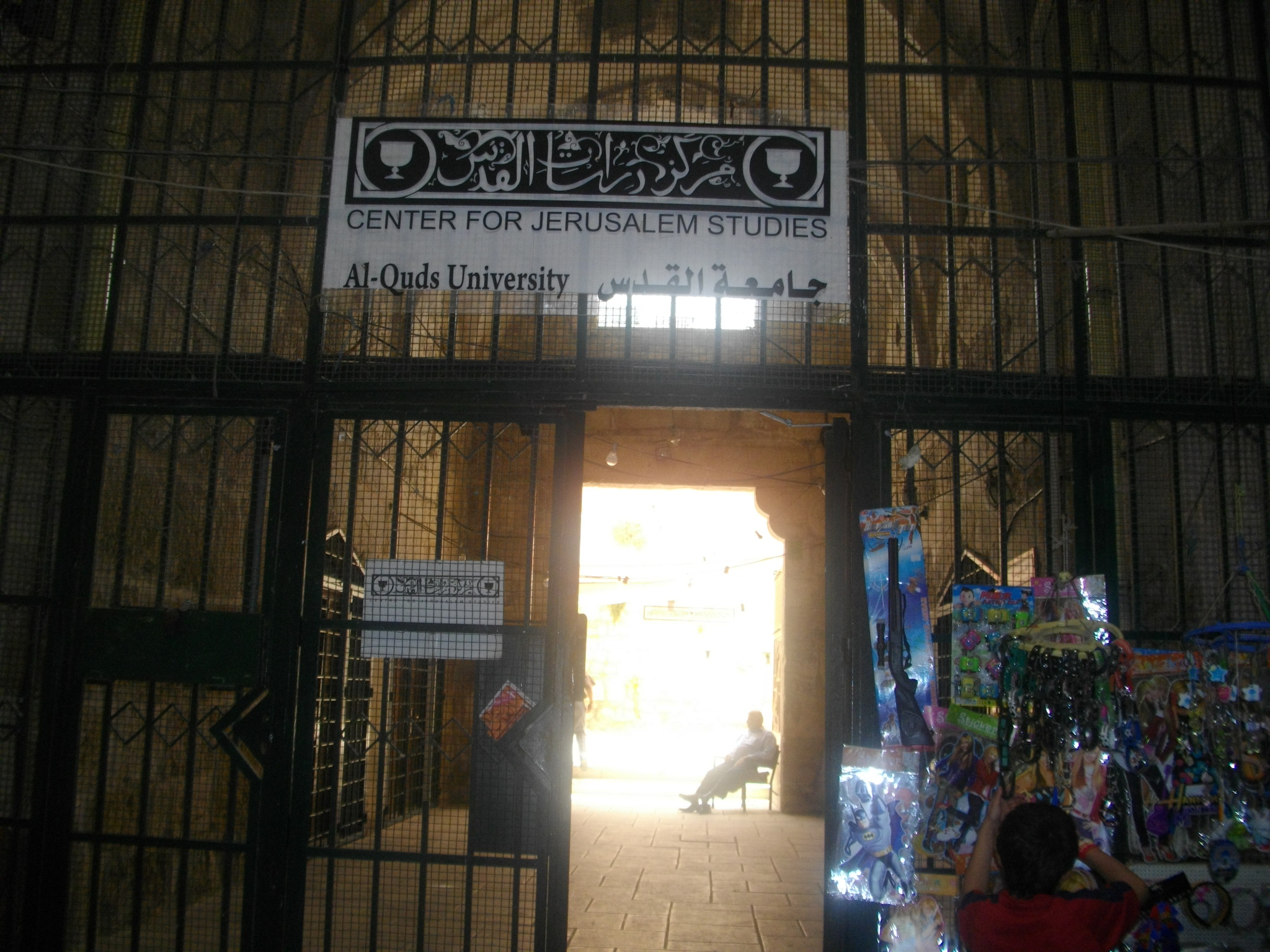
The entrance to the inn, a stall selling toys is seen on the right.

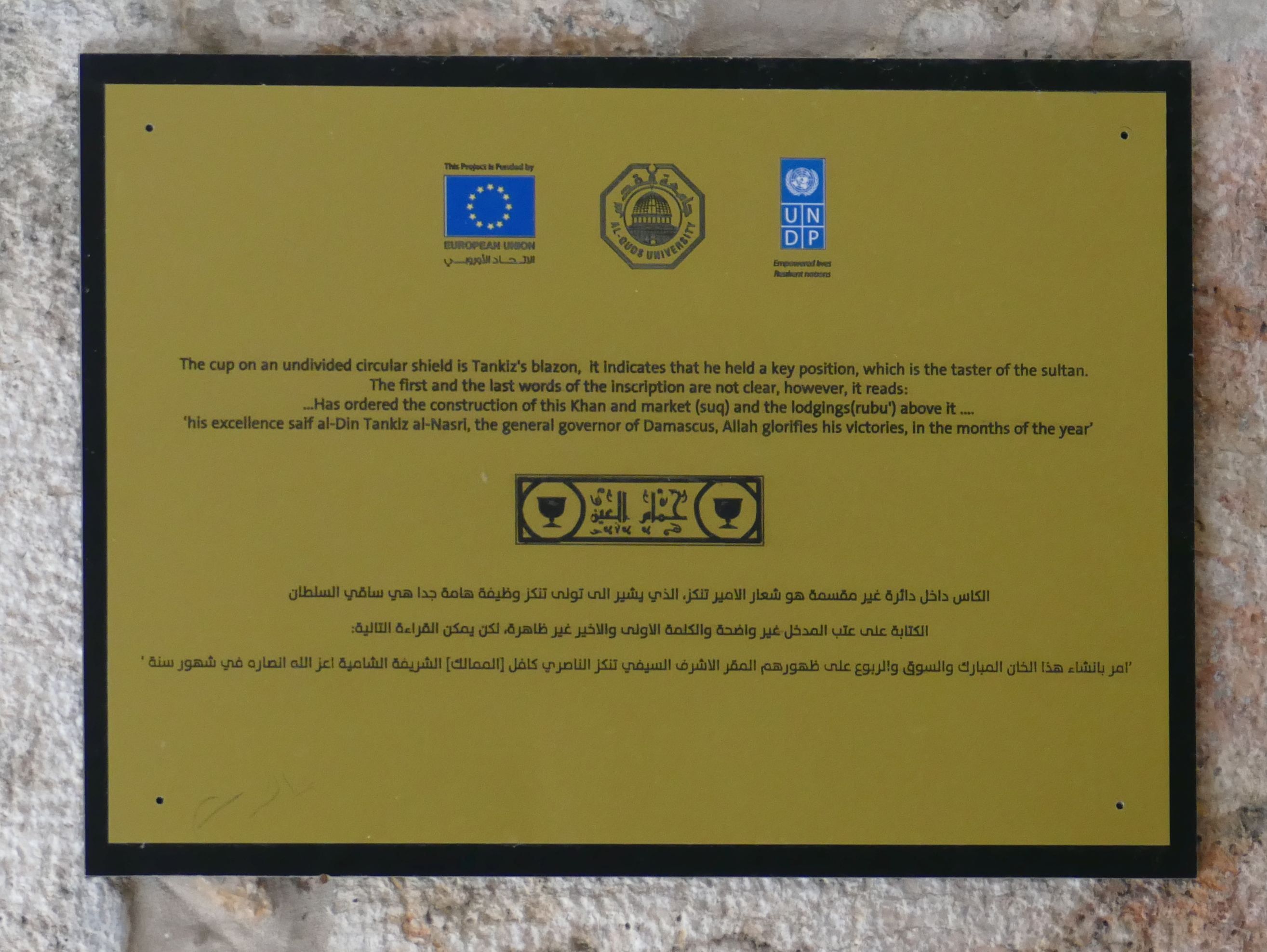
A sign found in the market, it contains a translation of an inscription found in the market.

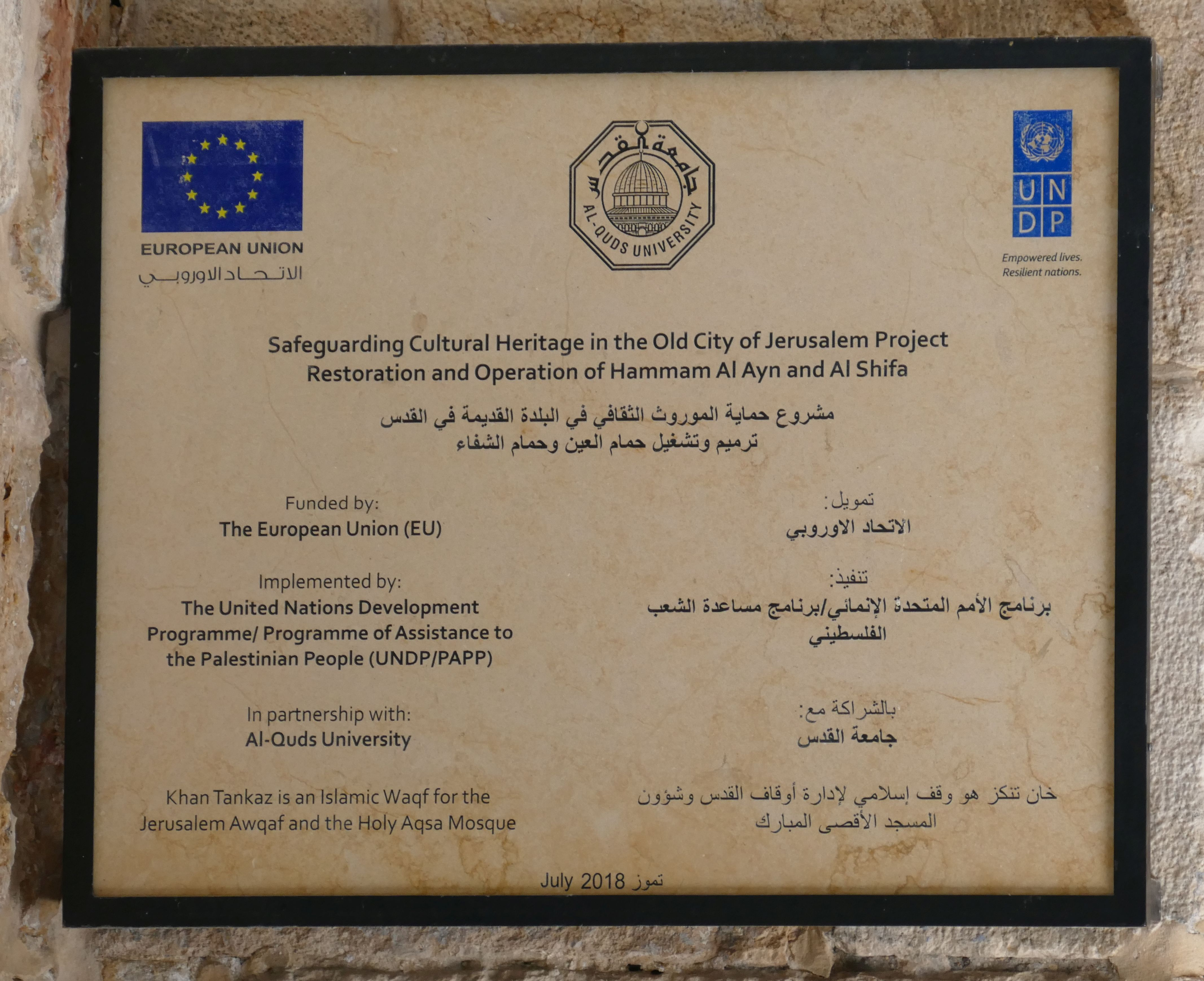
A sign from 2018, commemorating the restoration of the bathhouses.

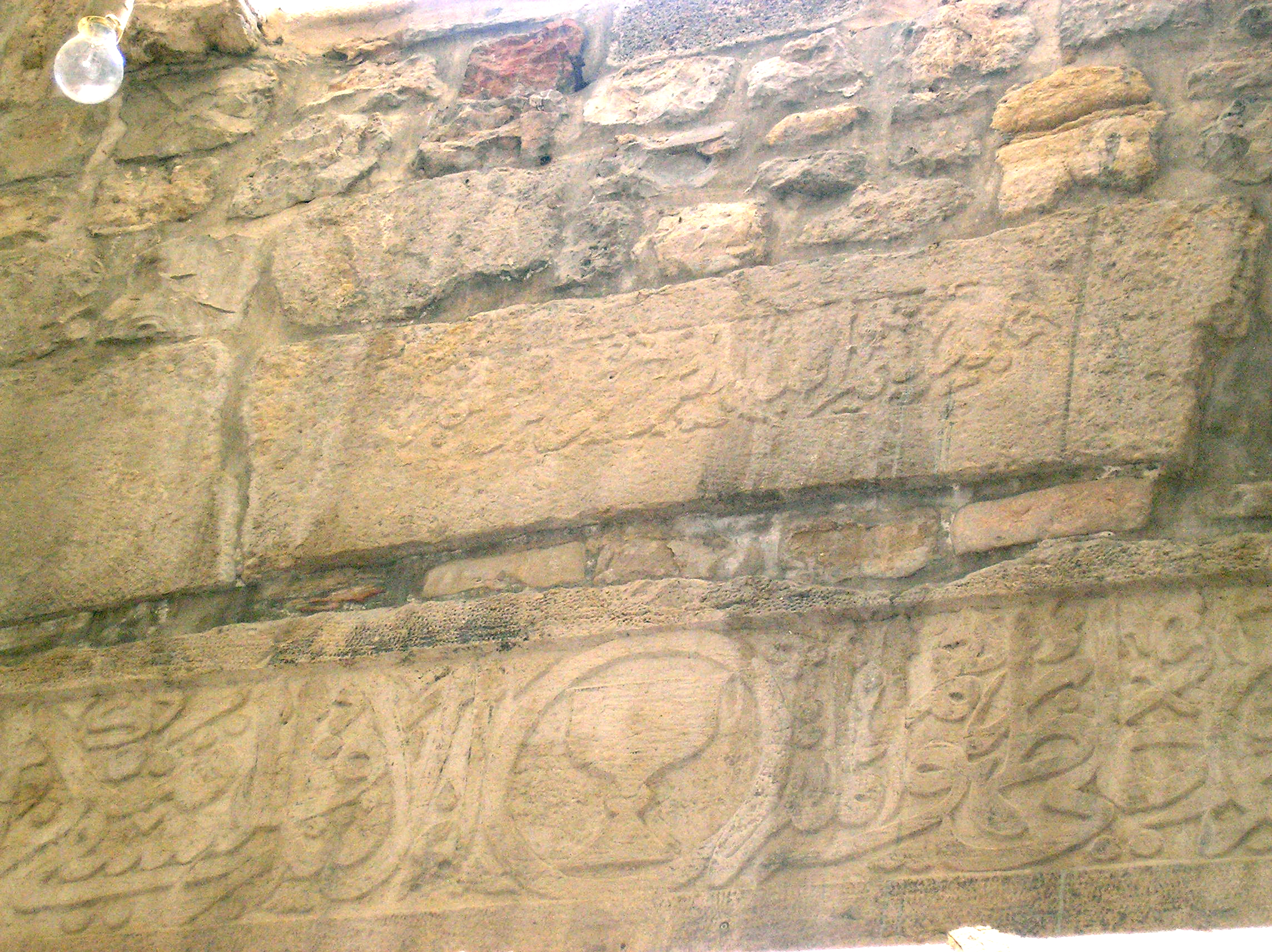
Arabic inscriptions found in the inn

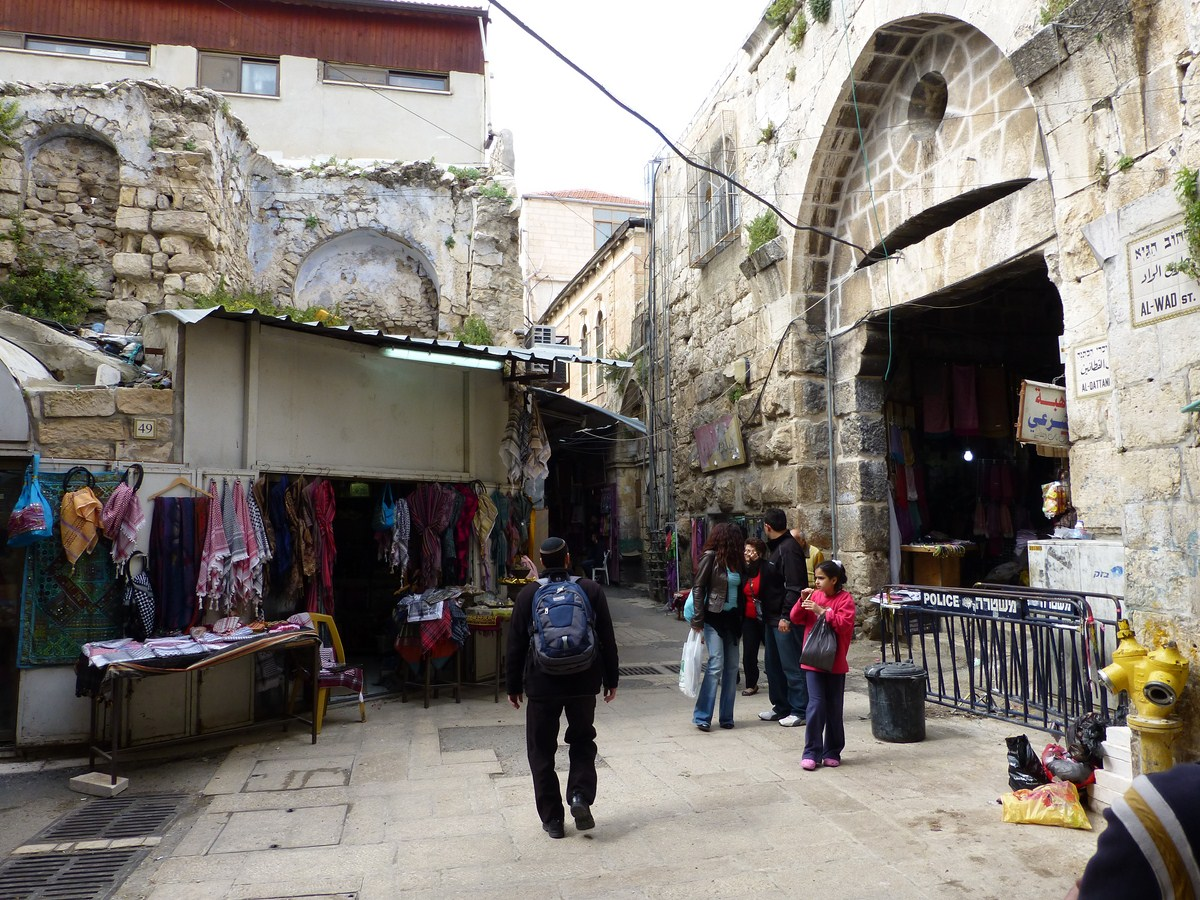
The entrance to the market, seen on the right, 2013.

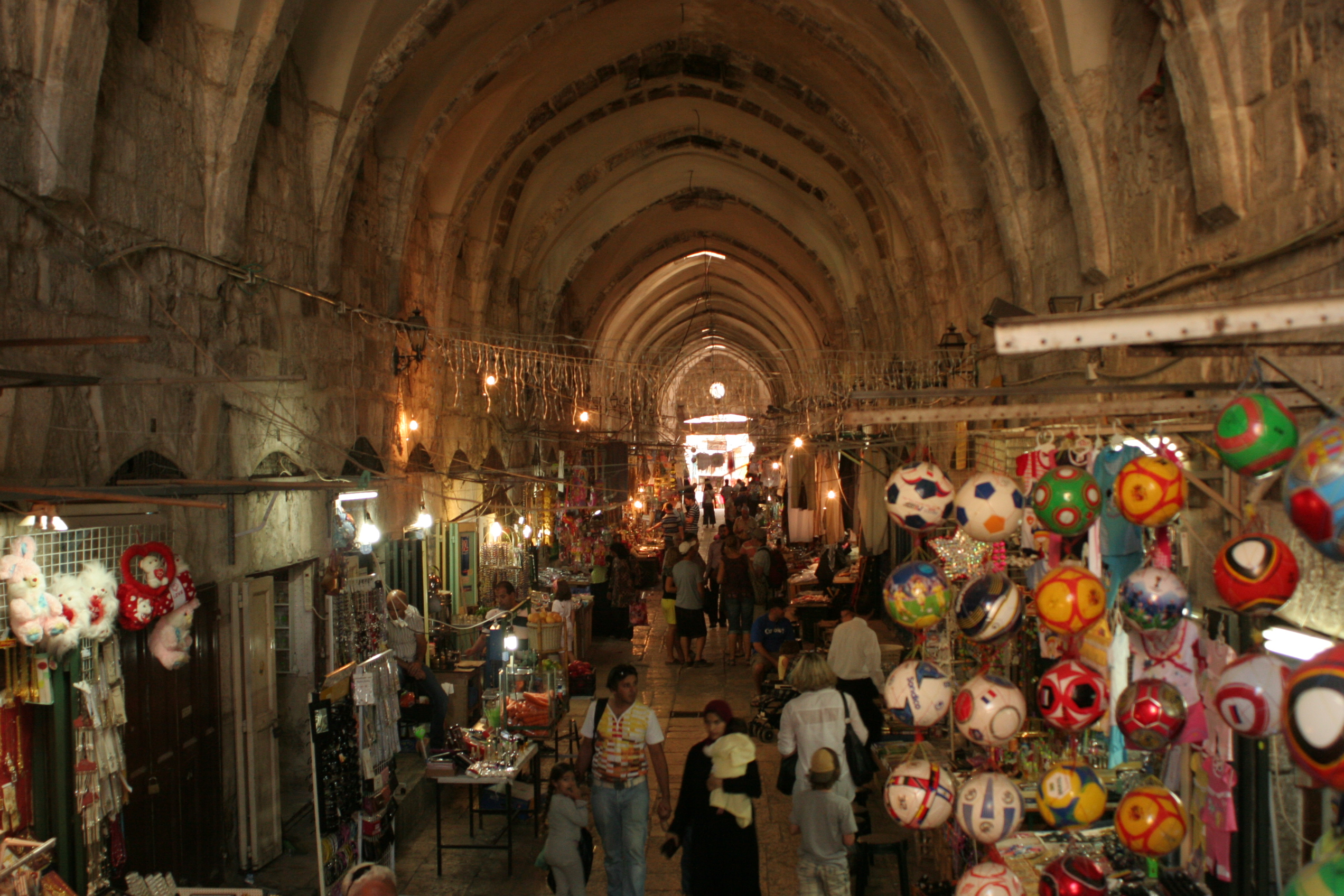
The market on a busy day, 2010.

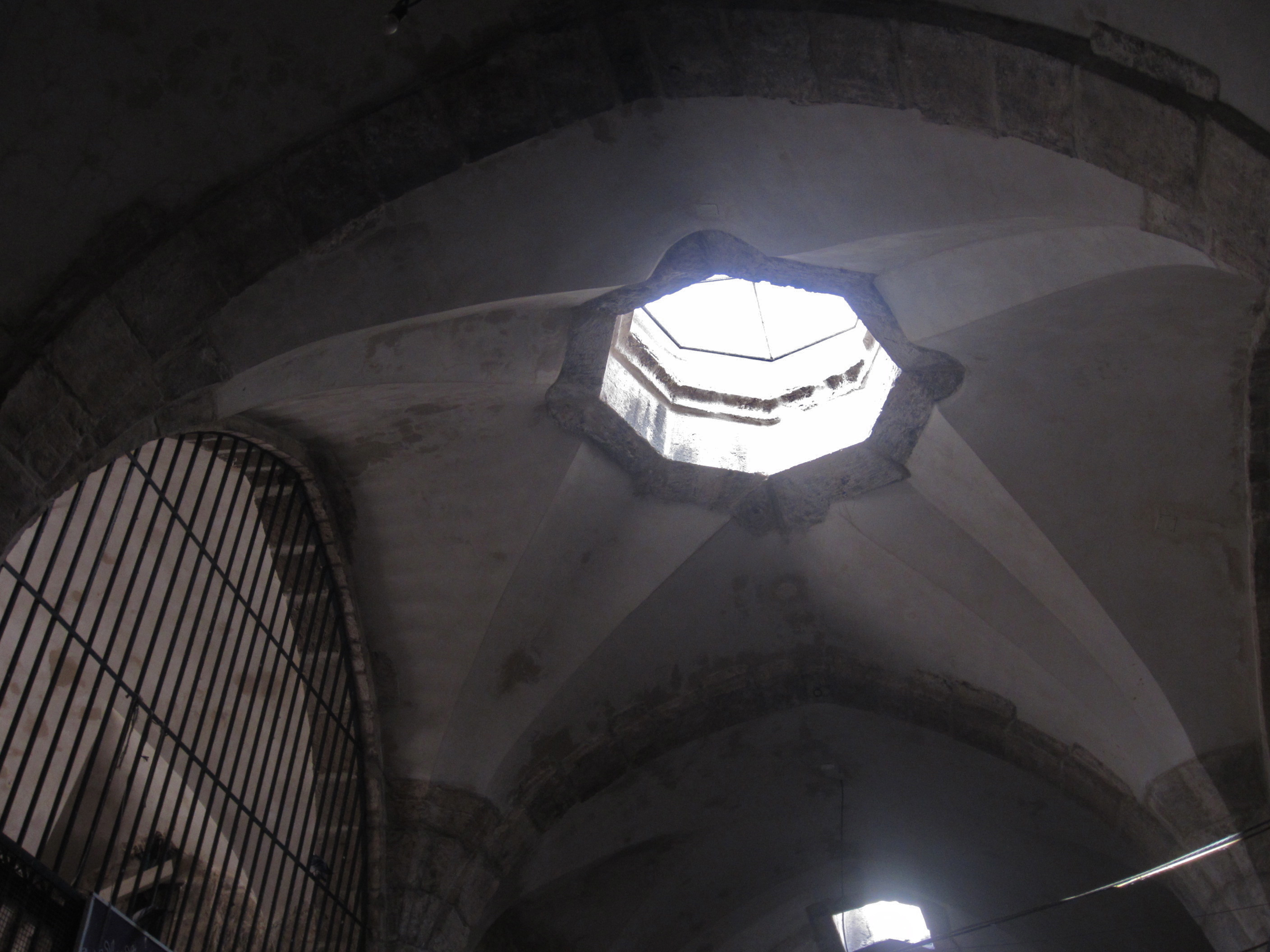
A hole in the markets ceiling, allowing sunlight in.

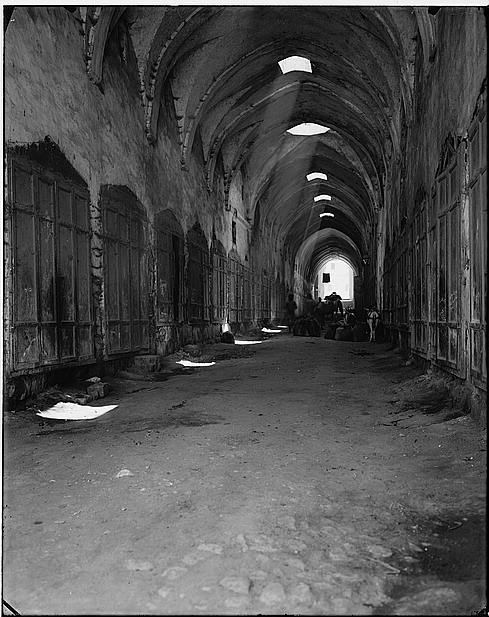
The market in 1919, by the American Colony, Jerusalem.

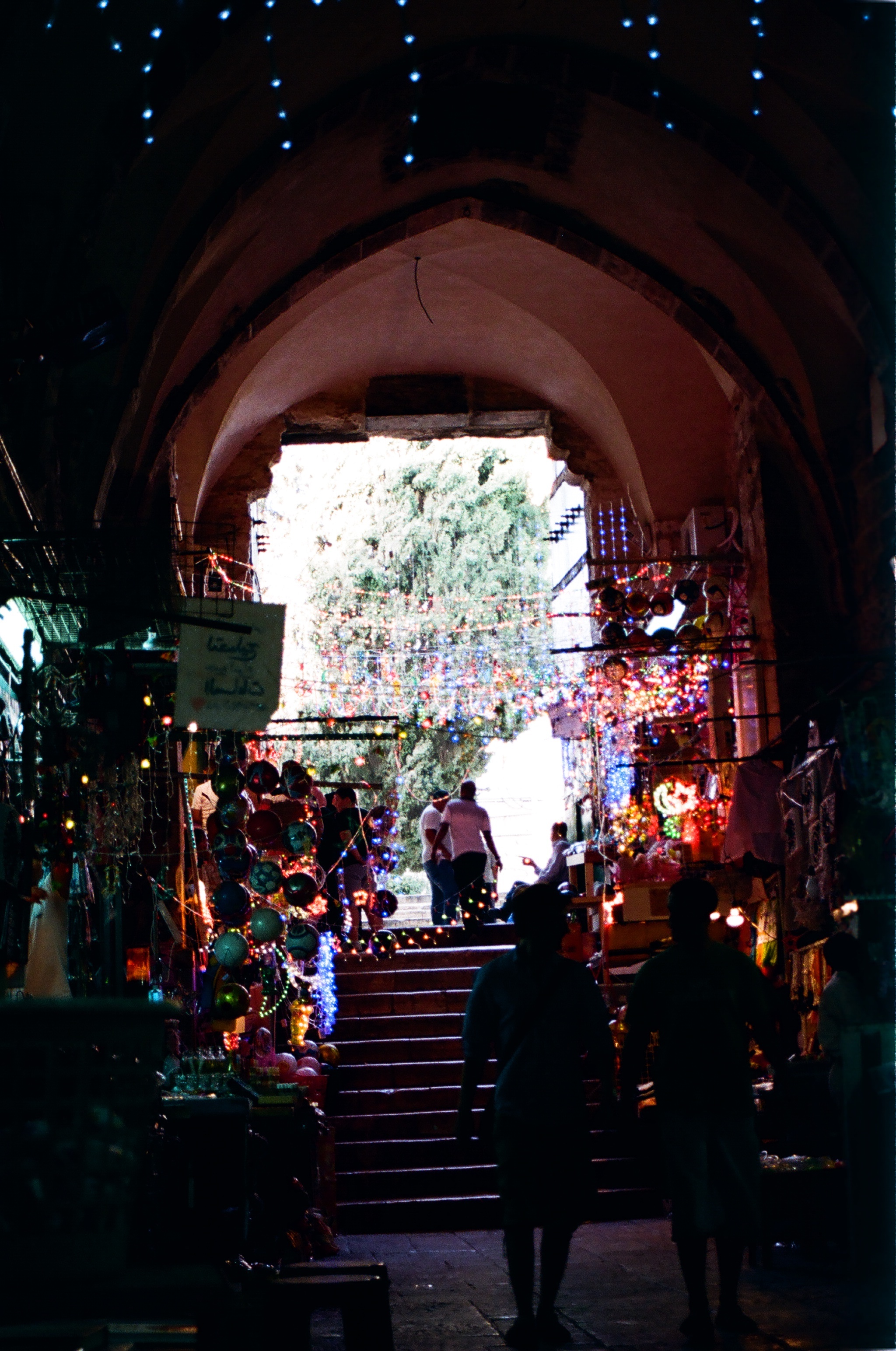
The Cotton Merchants' Gate, as seen from inside the market, Al-Aqsa Mosque can be seen through the gate.

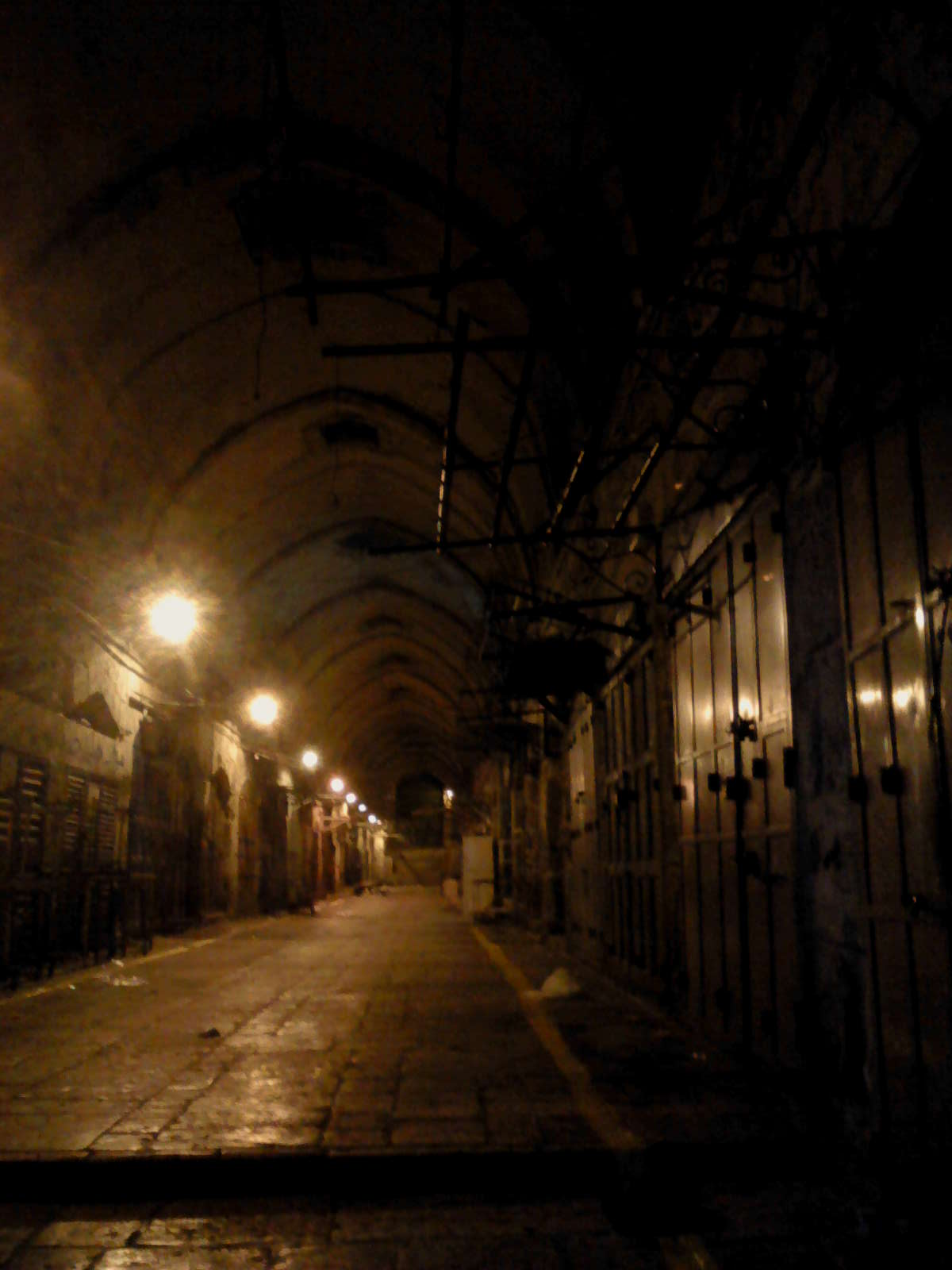
The market at night.

== See also ==
- Khan el-Khalili – Major souk in Cairo
- List of bazaars in Palestine and Israel
- List of bazaars and souks
