= Suq Khan az-Zait =

Market in the old city of Jerusalem

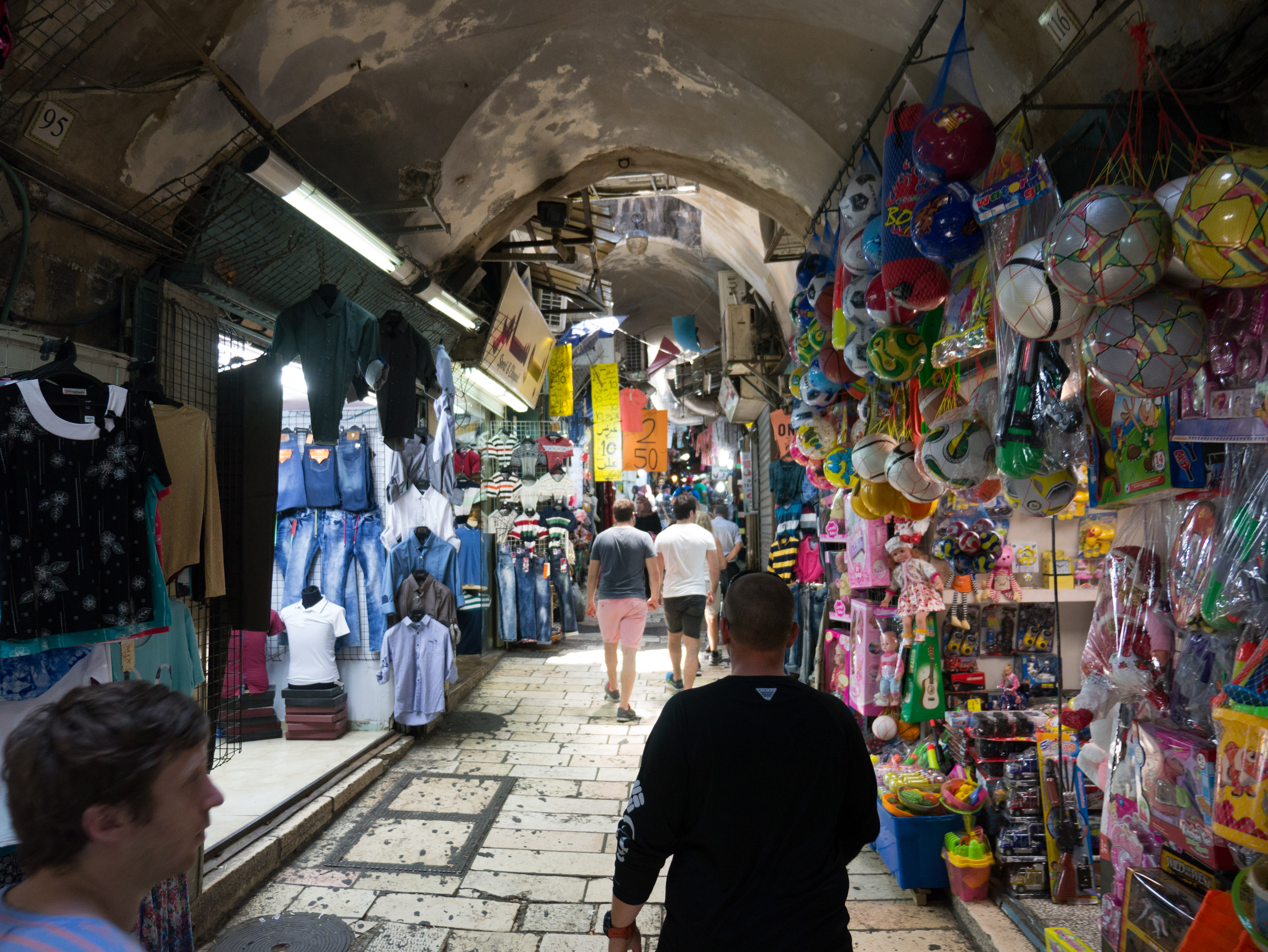
- Suq Khan az-Zait in 2015
- Native name: سوق خان الزيت (Arabic)
- Length: c. 400 metres (1,300 ft)
- Location: Old City of Jerusalem
- From: Damascus Gate
- To: Church of the Holy Sepulchre, Perfumers' Market

Suq Khan az-Zait is a street and a souk in the Old City of Jerusalem, it was initially established 2000 years ago during the roman rule of Jerusalem, then part of the Cardo, and continues to be a busy street in the 21st century. The 7th station of Via Dolorosa is found in the market.

== Name ==
The name Suq Khan az-Zeit can be translated to English as "Street of the Oil Merchants". In the market, an olive press dating back to the Mamluk era can be found in a location known as khan az-zeit (olive khan).

== Structures ==
=== Shops ===
As of 2019, there were 108 active shops in the market.

=== Khan al-Zayt ===
Khan al-Zayt (Arabic: خان الزيت, romanized: khān al-zayt) is a inn found in the street historically used to store olive oil, eventually becoming the namesake of the street.

19th century archeologist Conrad Schick studied the khan and published his analysis in the 1897 issue of the Palestine Exploration Fund, he took note of the presence of 2 cisterns used to store oil, which he attributed to the soap factory that once operated there. He also published 2 floor plans of the khan in that issue.

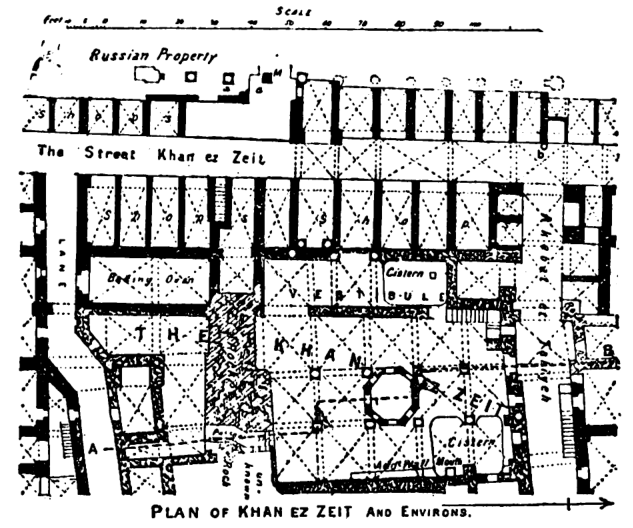
A top-down floorplan if the khan from 1897 by Conrad Schick

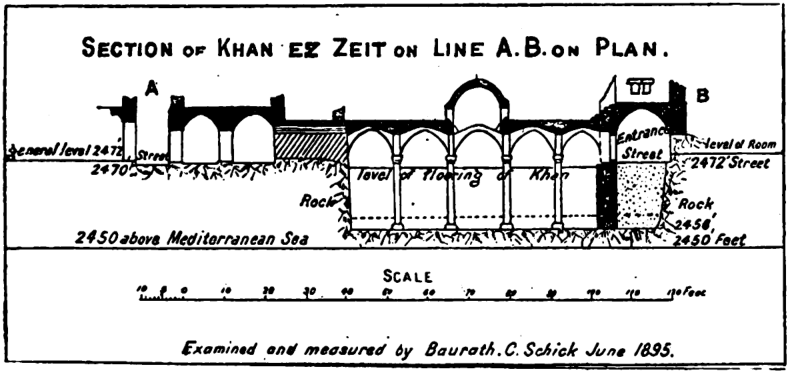
A side-profile floorplan if the khan from 1897 by Conrad Schick

=== Mosque ===
The Khan az-Zait Mosque was constructed in 1063 AH (1652/1653 CE) near the end of the souk, about 80 meters away from the cotton merchants market, only 800 meters away from Al-Aqsa Mosque, it was eventually repurposed into a shop. The mosque was damaged significantly by the 1927 Jericho earthquake.

=== Hashimi Hotel ===
The construction of the Hashimi Hotel is dated to around the 17th century. It was renovated 3 times in 1982, 1993, and 2013.

== History ==
=== Roman period ===
Roman vs modern Jerusalem

Basic schematic map of Jerusalem, as rebuilt by Hadrian (a reconstruction known as Aelia Capitolina), showing the two main north-south roads (Cardo Maximus and Cardo Minimus), and the two main east-west roads (Decumanus Maximus and Decumanus Minimus).

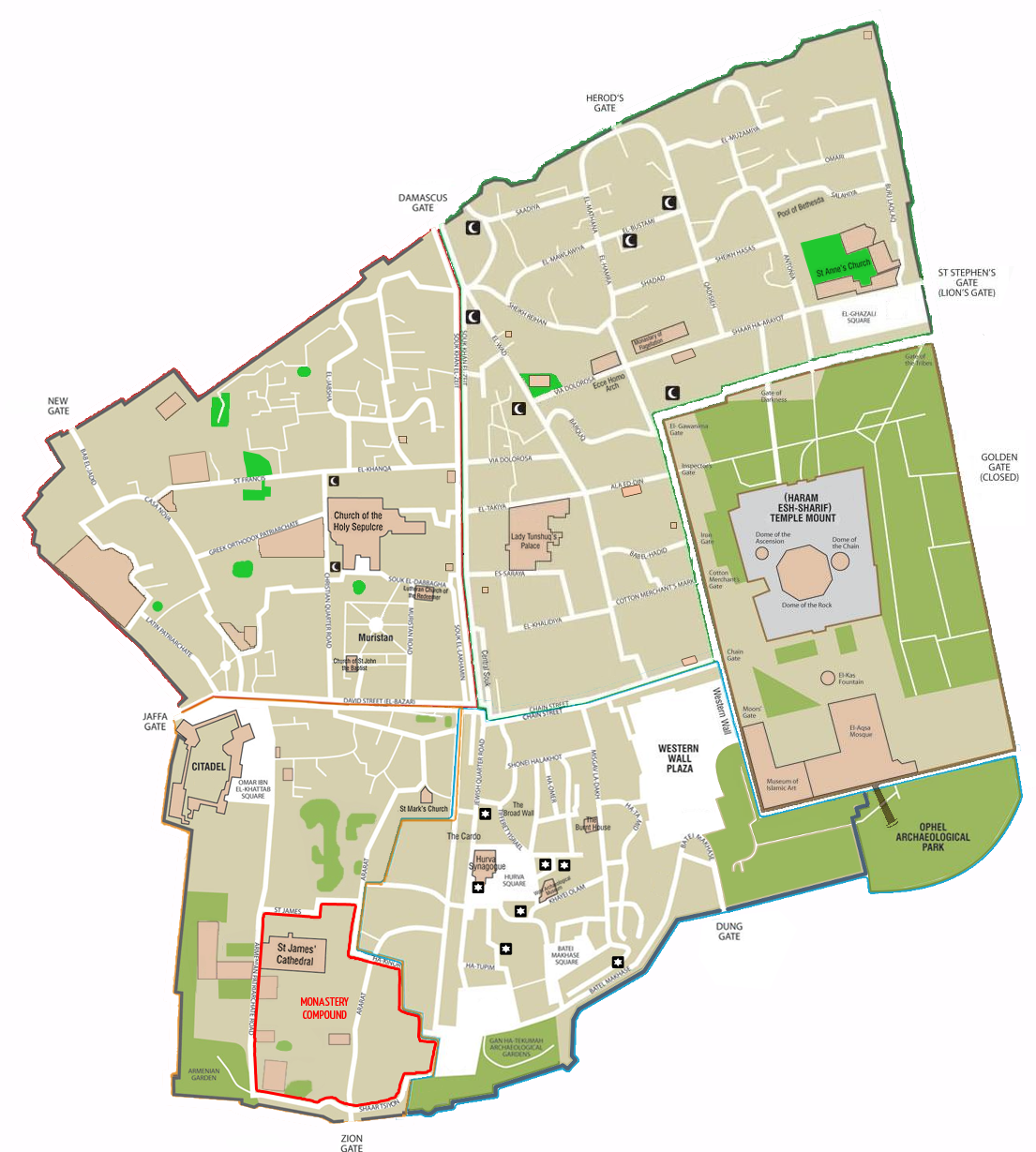
Modern day map of Jerusalem, al-wad street and suq khan ez-zait can be traced on it from north, where they split-off at Damascus gate, to south, suq khan az-zait is on the west

The street was initially established during the Roman rule of Jerusalem as a part of the Cardo; a throughfare from the north to the south of the city. It is believed by scholars that this was established during the reign of Hadrian as part of Aelia Capitolina. The exact history of the street during the Byzantine and Roman periods is uncertain and further archaeological excavations are complicated by the presence of the modern-day market.

=== Mamluk period ===
During the Mamluk rule of Jerusalem, the shops at the intersection of the two streets khan al-zayt street and Chain Street were a major commercial district. Most of their income was reserved for charitable trusts. The street pavement is believed to have been renovated during the Mamluk or Ayyubid periods.

=== Ottoman period ===
Soap factories, similar to those found in Nablus, operated in khan al-zayt as late as the 19th century. The remains of one masbana (Arabic: مصبنة) still exist in the street as of 2002, it is owned by the al-Qutayna family, who operated the factory. No such factories remain operational as of the 21st century. Unlike most other food stuffs, camel caravans transporting olive oil could not freely sell oil without first weighing it and unloading it into khan al-zayt. One soap factory was established in khan al-zayt in the 18th-19th century, it was listed in the records of a waqf that owned a share of it.

Ottoman authorities in the 16th century attempted to organised the markets into guilds, for instance, oil is to be sold in khan al-zayt and meat in the Butchers' market, but such regulations were frequently ignored.

=== Post-1967 ===
In April of 2023, the Israel Police restricted traffic through the street, hinder Holy Saturday celebrations. Similar restrictions were reported by The New Arab in 2024, during the Gaza war.

== Gallery ==
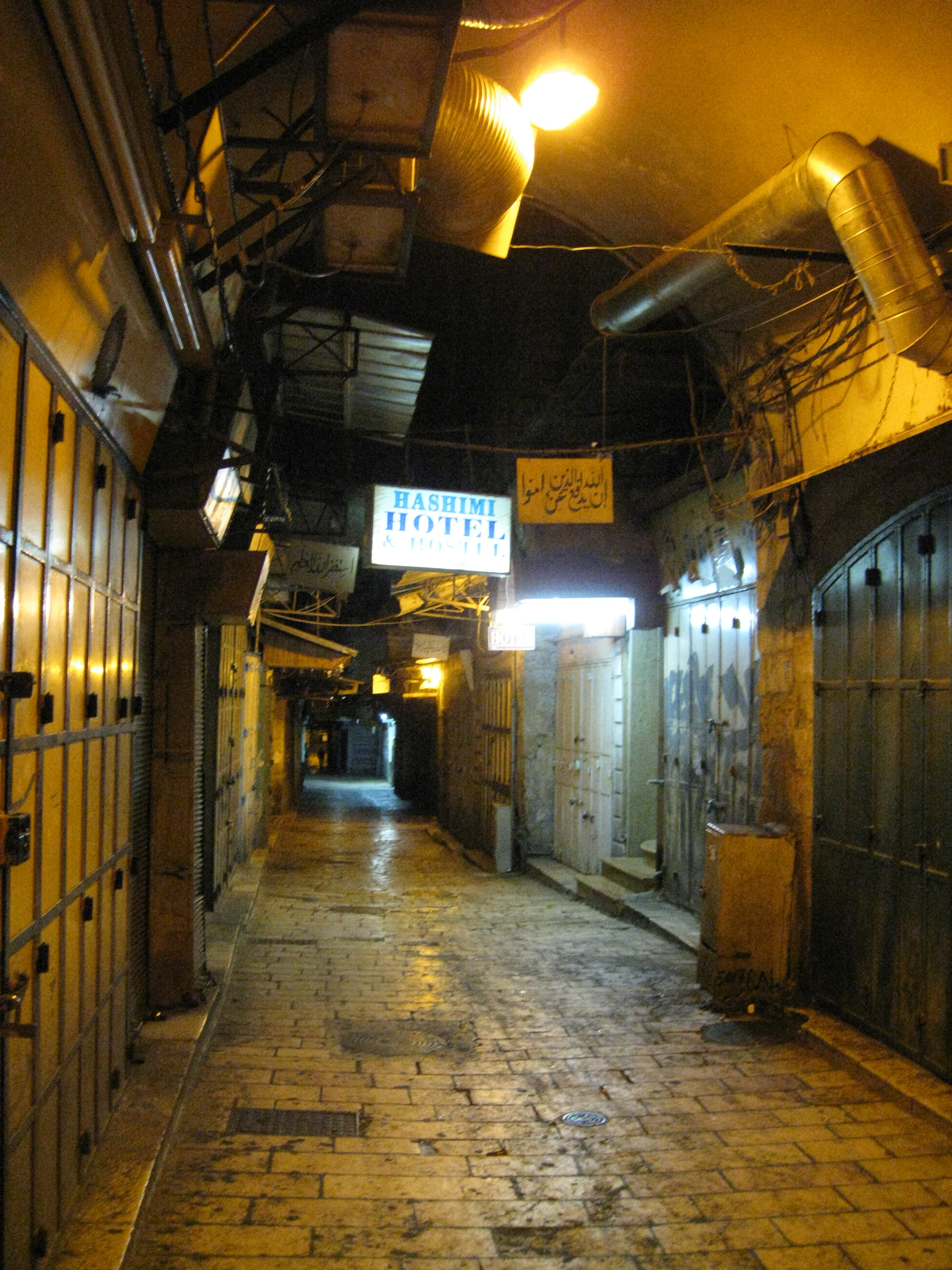
The market at night.

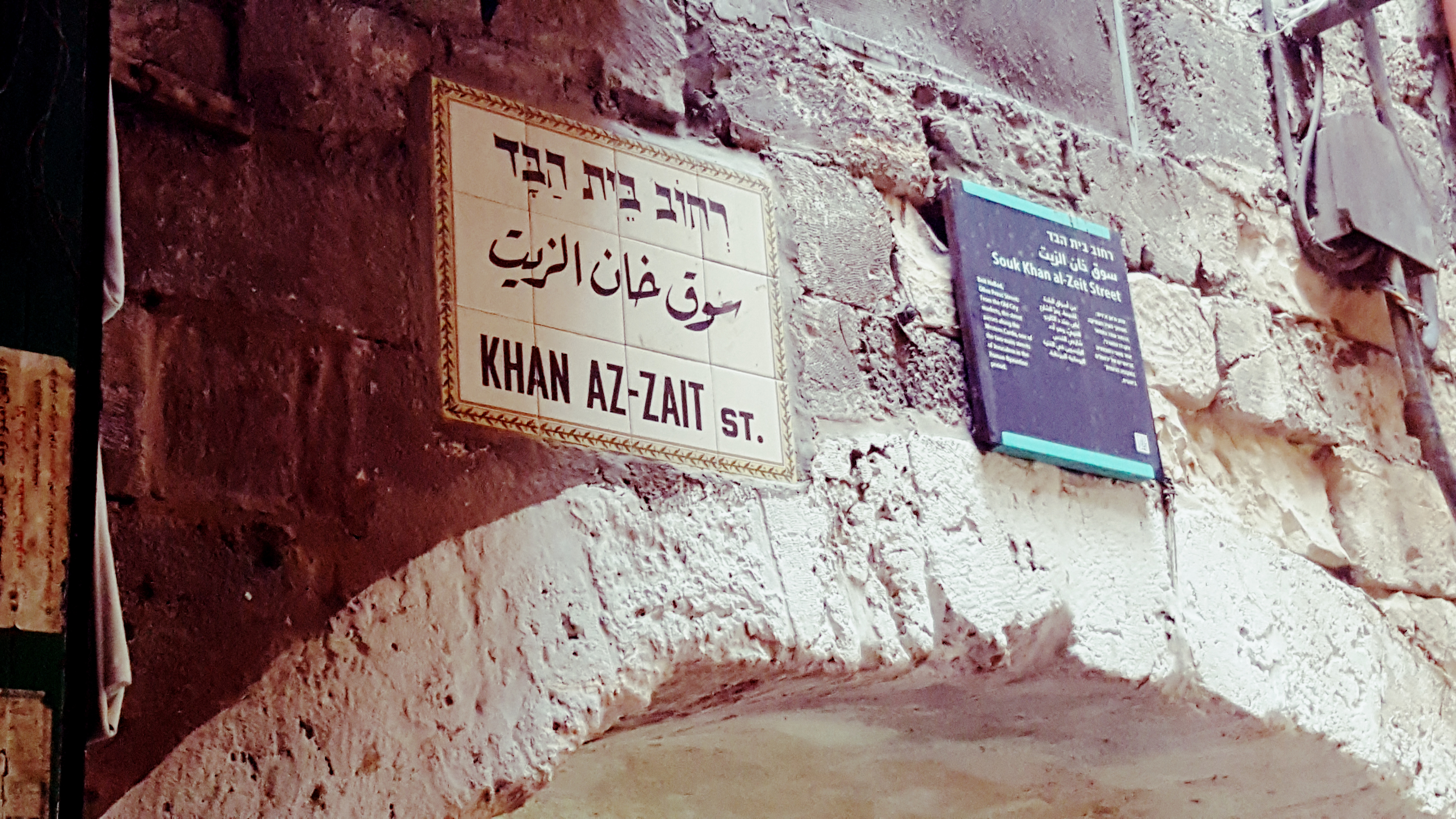
3-language sign in the market.

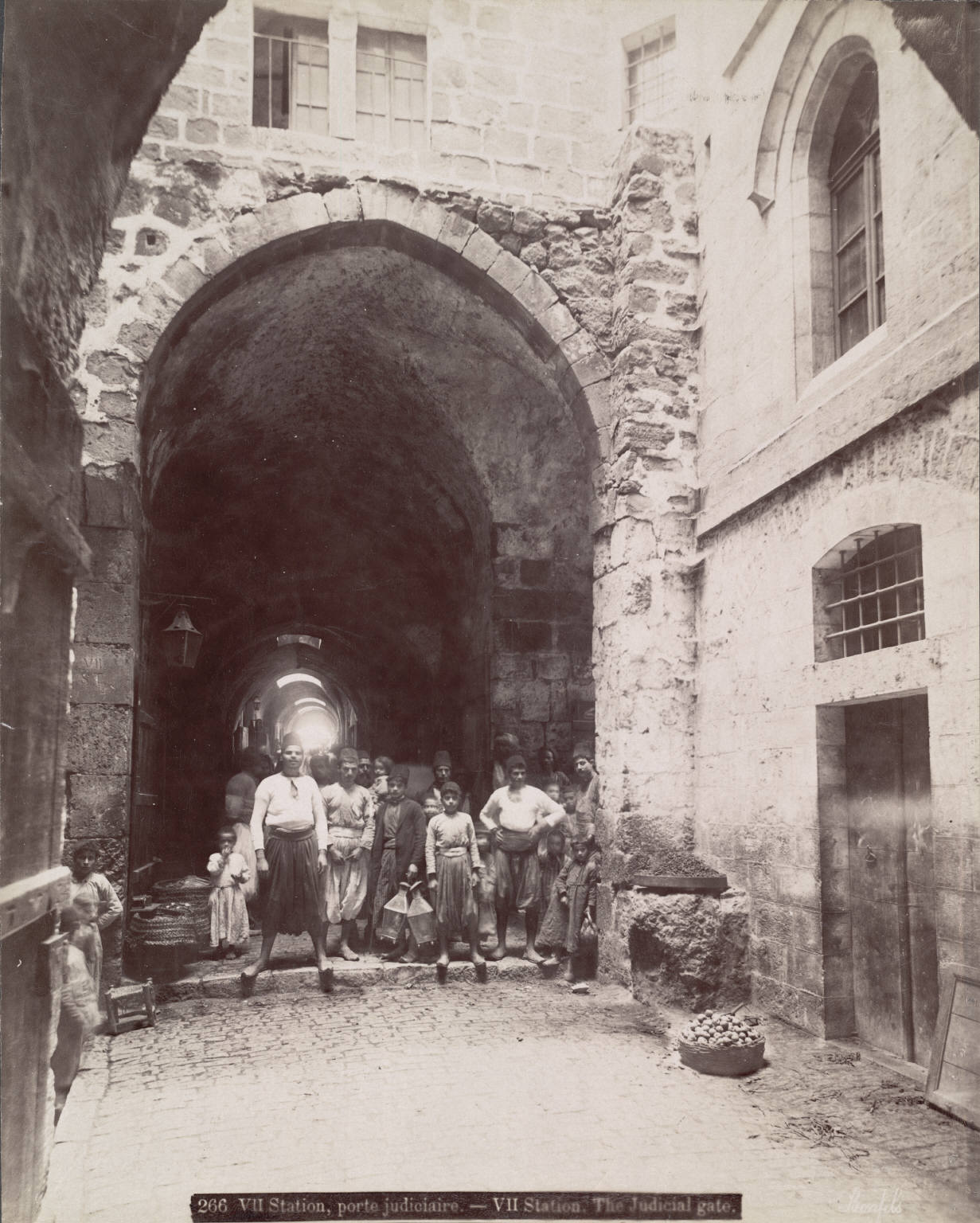
The market in the 19th century, by Felix Bonfils, the Seventh Station can be seen on the right.

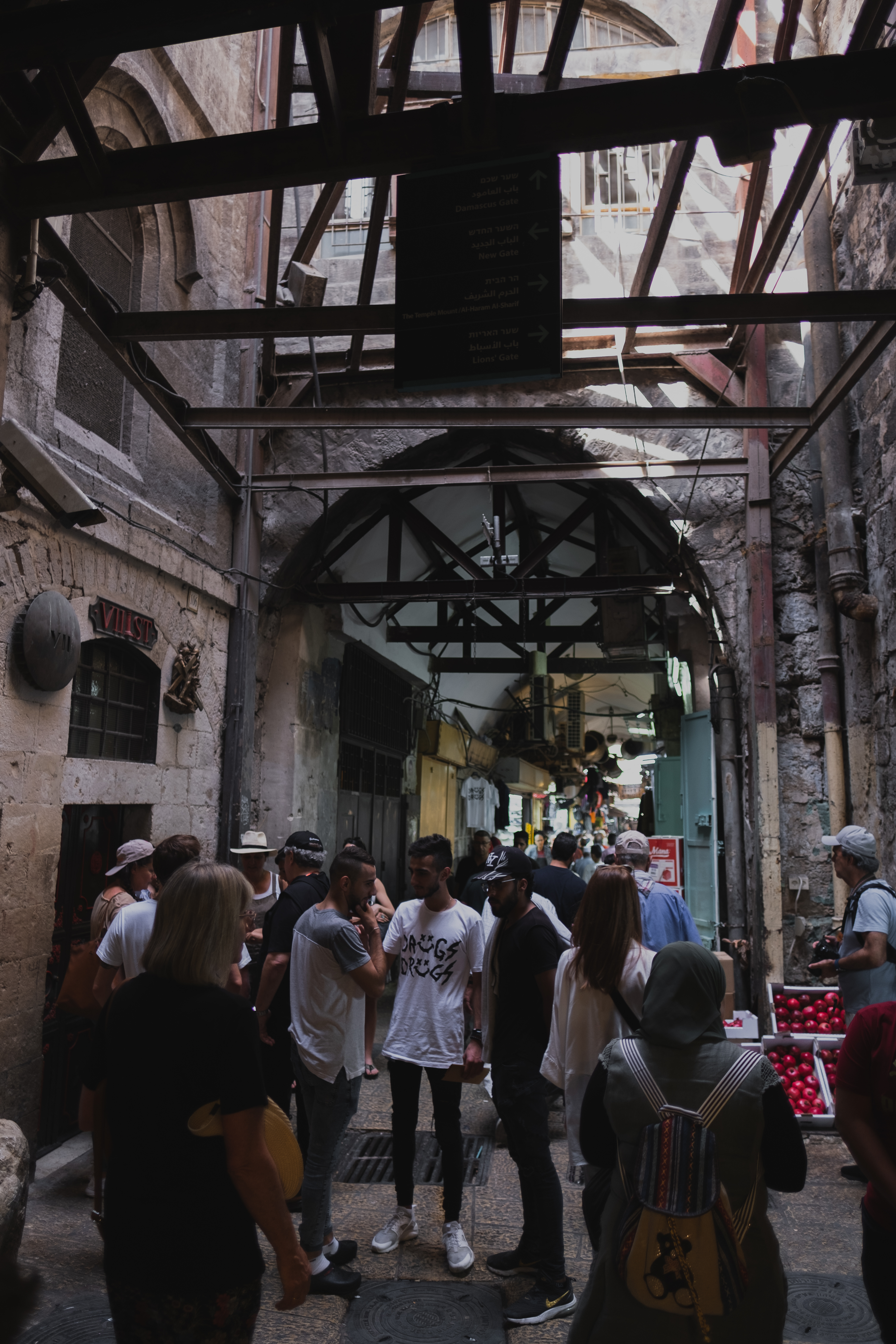
The Seventh station in 2019, on the left.

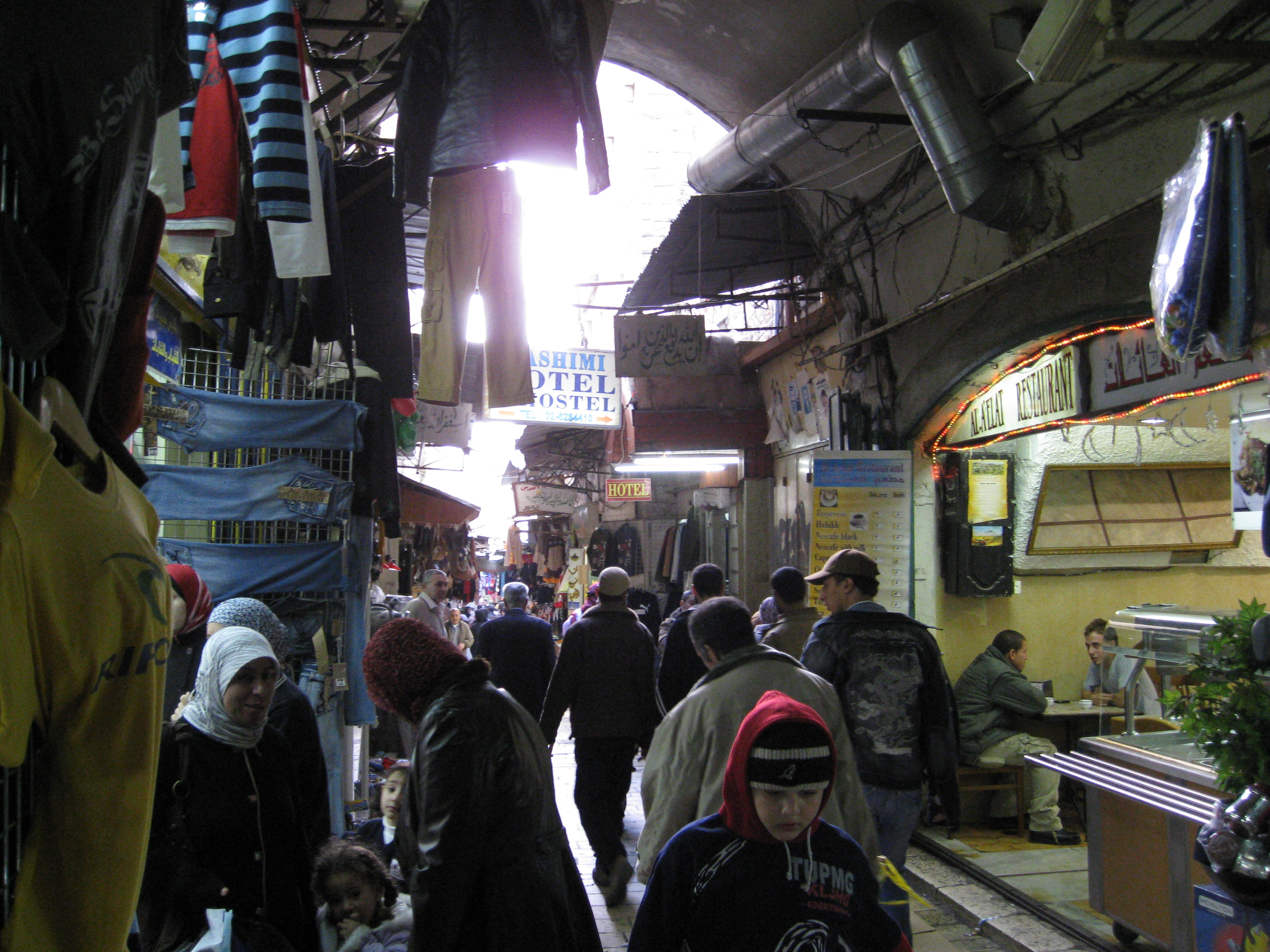
Clothing stores in the market, a cafe is seen on the right, 2007.
