= Neville Travers Borton =

British Army general and civil servant (1870–1938)

- Born: 29 June 1870
- Died: 1 June 1938 (aged 67)
- Military career
- Allegiance: United Kingdom
- Branch: British Army
- Service years: 1890 - 1924
- Rank: Brigadier General
- Units: Welch Regiment, Royal Warwickshire Regiment
- Commands: Military Governor of Jerusalem
- Conflicts: First World War
- Awards: CMG

Brigadier General Neville Travers Borton CMG (1870-1938), known in Egypt as Borton Pasha, was a British Army officer and civil servant, most famous for being Military Governor of Jerusalem when General Allenby entered the city in December 1917.

== Biography ==
Born on 29 June 1870, Neville Travers Borton was educated at Bedford School and at the Royal Military College, Sandhurst. He received his first commission in the Welch Regiment in 1890, and transferred to the Royal Warwickshire Regiment on 5 April 1899. He joined the Sudanese Civil Service in 1899, and the Egyptian Civil Service in 1905. He was Postmaster General of Egypt between 1907 and 1924, and was appointed as a Pasha in Egypt.

In 1917, General Edmund Allenby appointed Borton as Military Governor of Jerusalem, one of the four Military Governors of the Occupied Enemy Territory Administration, with the rank of Brigadier General. Brigadier General Borton led Allenby's procession when he entered Jerusalem at noon on 11 December 1917. He was succeeded as Military Governor of Jerusalem by Sir Ronald Storrs.

Brigadier General Neville Travers Borton was appointed a Companion of the Order of St Michael and St George in 1917. He retired in 1924, and died on 1 June 1938, aged 67.
