= Francis Storrs =

Francis Edmund Storrs (1883 – 10/11 November 1918) was a British academic and intelligence agent. He was the younger brother of Arabist and colonial administrator Sir Ronald Storrs.

He was educated at Radley College from 1897 to 1902, and then at Jesus College, Cambridge, where he received a BA; he won scholarships at both institutions He was a professor at Elphinstone College in Bombay in 1908, and then at Rangoon College in 1912.

He was called to the bar at the Inner Temple in 1911. On 28 November 1912, he married Catherine Josephine Schiff (d. 1956 Dec. quarter, Westminster).

During the First World War, he initially worked for the civil service in matters concerned with supplying Russia; he was awarded the Russian Order of St. Anne for this service. In 1916-17 he served with the Royal Naval Volunteer Reserve in Greece with the rank of Lieutenant, then in 1917 with the Secret Intelligence Service in the Aegean. At the time, large areas of Greece were effectively under Allied military occupation, nominally controlled by the Venizelist government. Storrs was responsible for the passport control and port control of some thirty islands in the Cyclades, and in effect for all counter-espionage work in this area.

He suffered the unusual indignity, in May 1917, of losing his front teeth to his own gunfire; whilst test-firing a surplus three-pounder gun they had mounted to a yacht, he ignored a warning to remove his pipe, and the recoil knocked out two teeth.

He worked under Compton Mackenzie, who left a favourable portrait of him in Ægean Memories (p. 25):

...without [Storrs], whatever fruits our work in the Cyclades bore could never have been achieved. Virgil and Horace spoke at his summons, and he commanded all the elegance of light verse that is the Cambridge man's prerogative.
His conscientiousness was almost excessive. Night after night he would be working on the files of his office until two or three in the morning after a hard day's work of almost incessant worrying interviews. He was a martyr to bad headaches, but I never heard him give way to more than a weary groan of expostulation when human folly or vice was seeming unendurable any longer. I can never repay Francis Storrs in this world for his personal loyalty and devoted service.

In the autumn of 1917 he left Athens, and moved back to London, where he was in residence in May 1918. He died in Chelsea, of the Spanish flu, on the 10th or 11 November 1918. Sources vary; it is likely he died at some point in the night, and did not live to see the Armistice. A bell at Rochester Cathedral, where his father was Dean, was dedicated in his memory in 1921, as was a French prize at Radley College.
