= Ronald Storrs =

British colonial official (1881–1955)

Sir Ronald Storrs KCMG, CBE
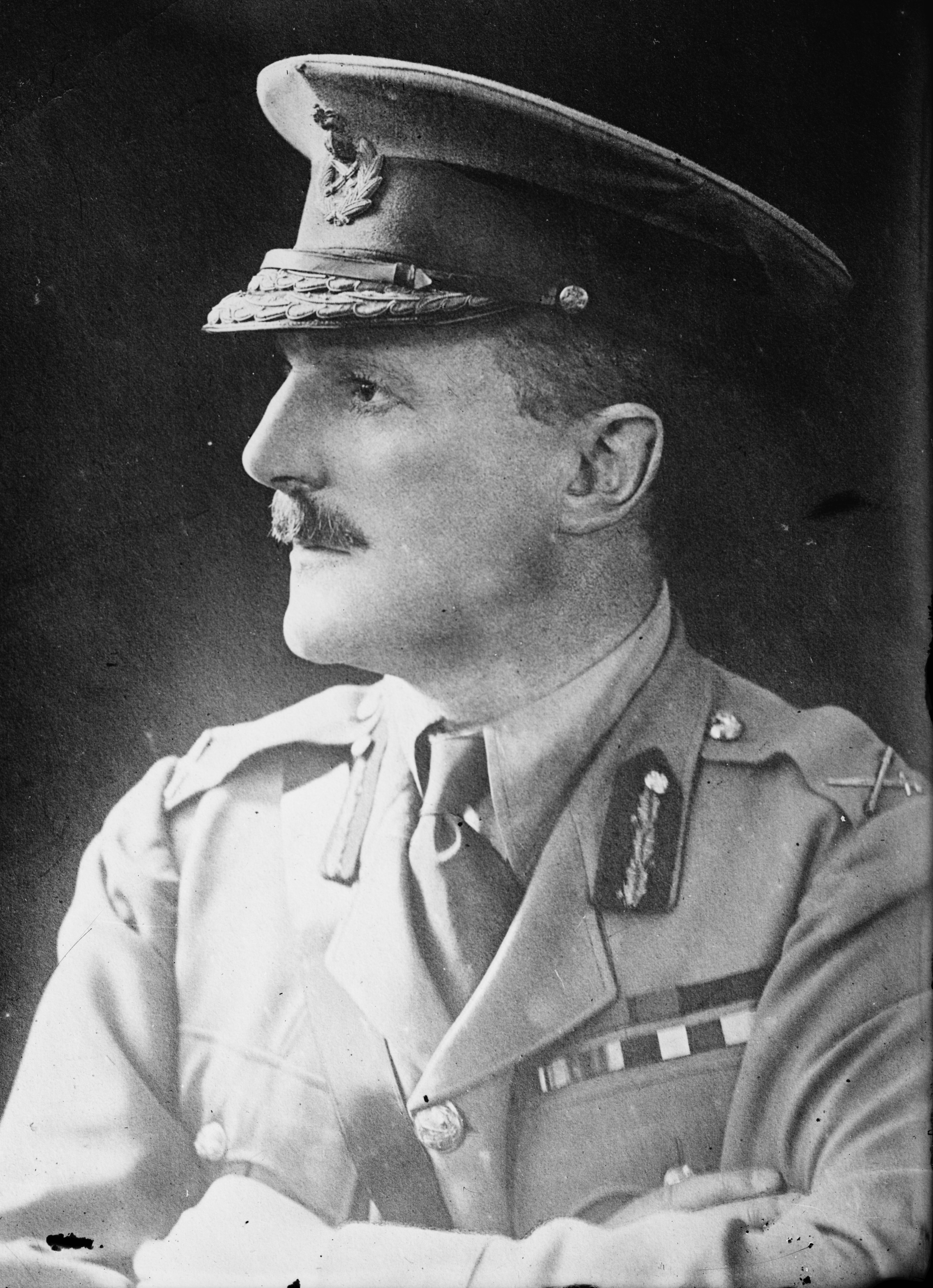

Governor of Northern Rhodesia
- In office 27 October 1932 – 19 February 1934
- Preceded by: Sir James Maxwell
- Succeeded by: Sir Hubert Winthrop Young

Governor of Cyprus
- In office 30 November 1926 – 29 October 1932
- Monarch: George V
- Preceded by: Sir Malcolm Stevenson
- Succeeded by: Sir Reginald Stubbs

Governor of Jerusalem and Judea
- In office 1 July 1920 – 30 November 1926
- Preceded by: Office established
- Succeeded by: Edward Keith-Roach

Military Governor of Jerusalem
- In office 28 December 1917 – 30 June 1920
- Preceded by: Neville Travers Borton
- Succeeded by: Office disestablished

Personal details
- Born: 19 November 1881 Bury St Edmunds, Suffolk, UKGBI
- Died: 1 November 1955 (aged 73) St Stephen's Hospital, Chelsea, UK
- Resting place: St John the Baptist Church
- Spouse: Louisa Lucy Storrs (m. 1923)
- Parent: John Storrs (father)
- Relatives: Francis Storrs (brother); Monica Storrs (sister); Christopher Storrs (brother); Peregrine Cust, 6th Baron Brownlow (cousin)
- Education: Pembroke College, Cambridge, BA, 1903

Sir Ronald Henry Amherst Storrs KCMG CBE (19 November 1881 – 1 November 1955) was an official in the British Foreign Office. He served as Oriental Secretary in Cairo, Military Governor of Jerusalem, Governor of Cyprus, and Governor of Northern Rhodesia.

== Early life and education ==
Storrs was born on 19 November 1881 in Bury St Edmunds to John Storrs, the then vicar of St Peter's Church and later Dean of Rochester, and Lucy Anna Marie Cust. One of six siblings, Storrs was the brother of Francis Storrs, an academic and intelligence agent, Monica Storrs, a missionary, and Christopher Storrs, an Anglican bishop. Storrs was the maternal cousin of Peregrine Cust, 6th Baron Brownlow.

Educated at Temple Grove School and Charterhouse School, Storrs later enrolled at Pembroke College, Cambridge. Storrs graduated with a Bachelor's in Classical Tripos in 1903, after which he studied Arabic under Edward Granville Browne.

== Foreign service ==
=== Egypt ===
Storrs entered the Finance Ministry of the Egyptian Government in 1904, five years later becoming Oriental Secretary to the British Agency, succeeding Harry Boyle in this post. In 1917, Storrs became Political Officer representing the Egyptian Expeditionary Force in Mesopotamia as Liaison officer for the Anglo-French mission in Baghdad and Mesopotamia where he met Gertrude Bell and Sir Percy Cox.

T. E. Lawrence commented in Seven Pillars of Wisdom:

The first of all of us was Ronald Storrs, Oriental Secretary of the Residency, the most brilliant Englishman in the Near East, and subtly efficient, despite his diversion of energy in love of music and letters, of sculpture, painting, of whatever was beautiful in the world's fruit... Storrs was always first, and the great man among us.

Storrs is credited with a classic example of British understatement when referring to the behaviour of the British toward the many tribal and regional leaders that the British were trying to influence in "The Great Game": "we deprecated the imperative, preferring instead the subjunctive or even, wistfully, the optative mood".

During the First World War Storrs was a member of the Arab Bureau and a participant in the negotiations between Hussein bin Ali, Sharif of Mecca and the British government, and in the organisation of the Arab Revolt. His own personal positions were that the Sharif Husayn was asking for more Arab territory than he had any right to, and that Syria and Palestine should be incorporated into a British-sponsored Egyptian empire as a replacement for the Ottoman Empire, a plan which was never implemented. Storrs is thought to have underestimated Arab Muslim resistance to non-Muslim rule.

=== Palestine ===
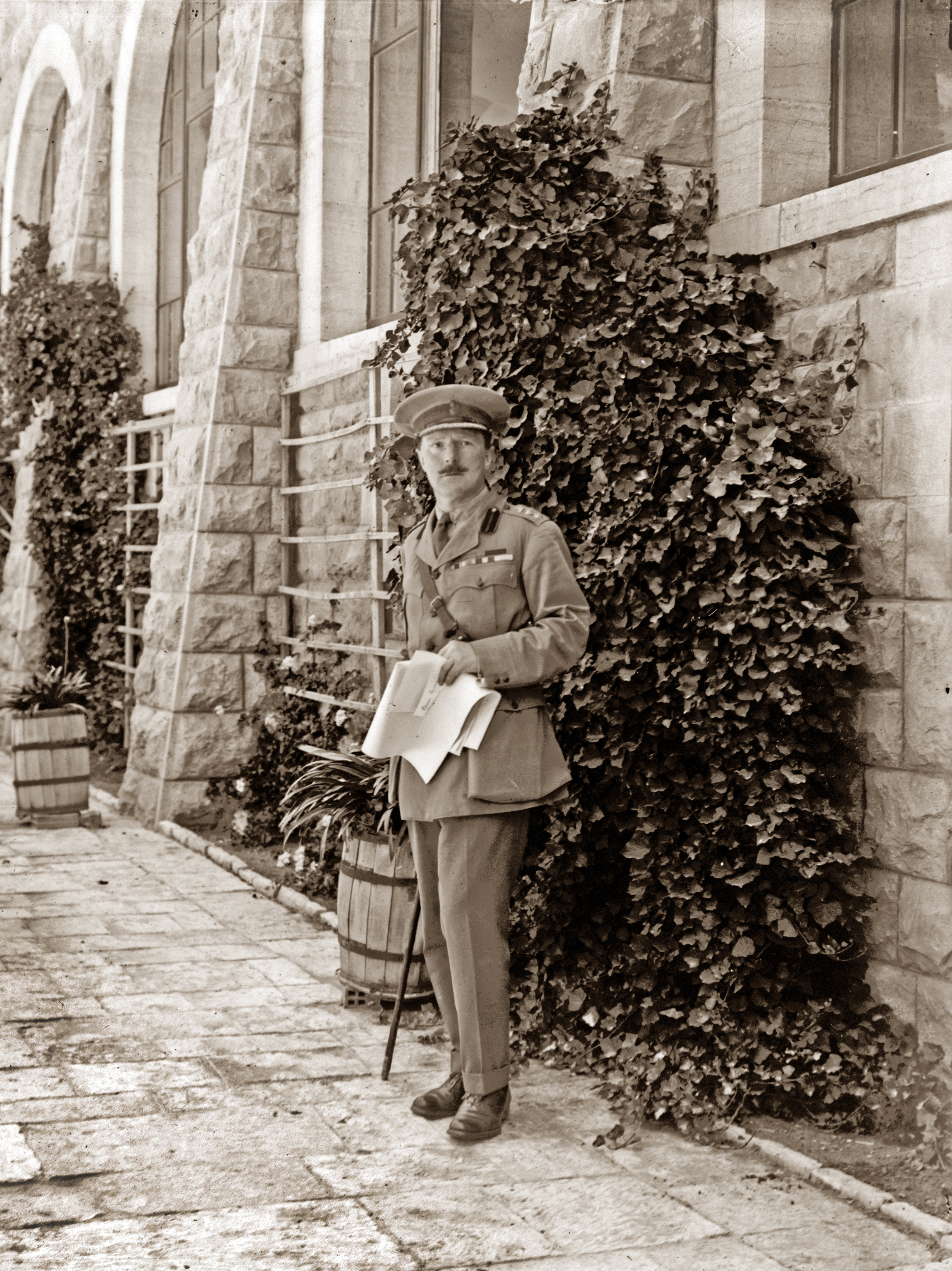
Storrs in Jerusalem in 1920

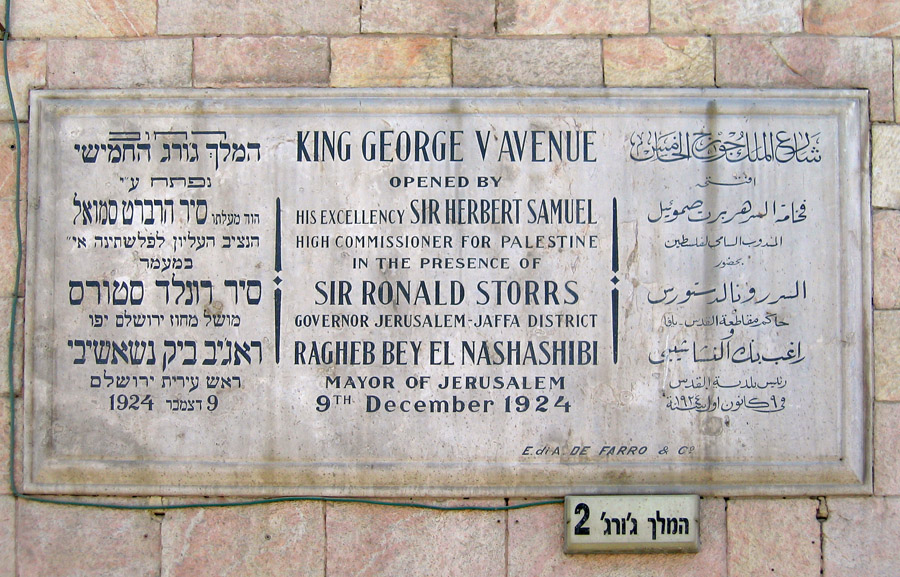
Plaque in Jerusalem commemorating the inauguration of King George Street in 1924

In 1917, Storrs became Military Governor of Jerusalem, within the Occupied Enemy Territory Administration, for which purpose he was given the British Army rank of colonel. He claimed to be "the first military governor of Jerusalem since Pontius Pilate". He was in fact the second British military governor of Jerusalem, succeeding Brigadier General Neville Travers Borton, also known as Borton Pasha, who resigned after two weeks due to ill health. In 1919, Storrs was appointed a Commander of the Order of the Crown of Italy.

The 1920 Nebi Musa riots occurred during his military governorship, and the following year he became Civil Governor of Jerusalem and Judea. In both positions he attempted to support Zionism while protecting the rights of the Arab inhabitants of Palestine, and thus earned the hostility of both sides. Recent research by Moya Tönnies argues that, within his scope of action, he in fact acted against political Zionism. He devoted much of his time to cultural matters, including town planning, and to the Pro-Jerusalem Society, a cultural organisation that he founded. Storrs acted as President of the Society. In 1918, he issued a requirement that all buildings in the city be faced with Jerusalem stone to maintain a consistent appearance. His aesthetic interventions have been analysed as politically motivated pro-Arab "Colonial Diplomacy through Art."

In 1918, Storrs created the position of Grand Mufti of Jerusalem as the Sunni Muslim cleric in charge of Jerusalem's Islamic holy places, including Al-Aqsa. Kamil al-Husayni was the first to hold the position.

Palestine's first chess club was the International Chess Club founded in Jerusalem in 1918 by Storrs. The International Chess Club was an expression of the hope that it would unite the different nations – local Arabs and Jews, and European Christians of various nations who were then stationed in the city – and help promote peace and understanding. The club closed within a year due to the increasing tensions between the Arabs and Jews. A chess enthusiast, Storrs also helped to organise in 1919 the city's first championship which was won by Shaul Gordon, the founder of Mercantile Bank.

In Jerusalem, Storrs co-published a book dedicated to his uncle Harry Cust in 1918. He arranged for its printing by at the Stamperia Francescana in the Old City.

=== Cyprus and Rhodesia ===
From 1926 to 1932, Storrs was Governor and Commander-in-Chief of Cyprus. During his tenure, there was an attempted revolt (1931) during which Government House was burned to the ground.

Storrs was then appointed as Governor of Northern Rhodesia in 1932. He retired for health reasons in 1934, at the age of 53.

=== Later years ===
Storrs was one of the six pallbearers at the funeral of T.E. Lawrence in 1935. In 1937, he published his memoirs Orientations. Between 1937 and 1945 he served on the London County Council, and during the Second World War he broadcast for the Ministry of Information.

== Personal life ==
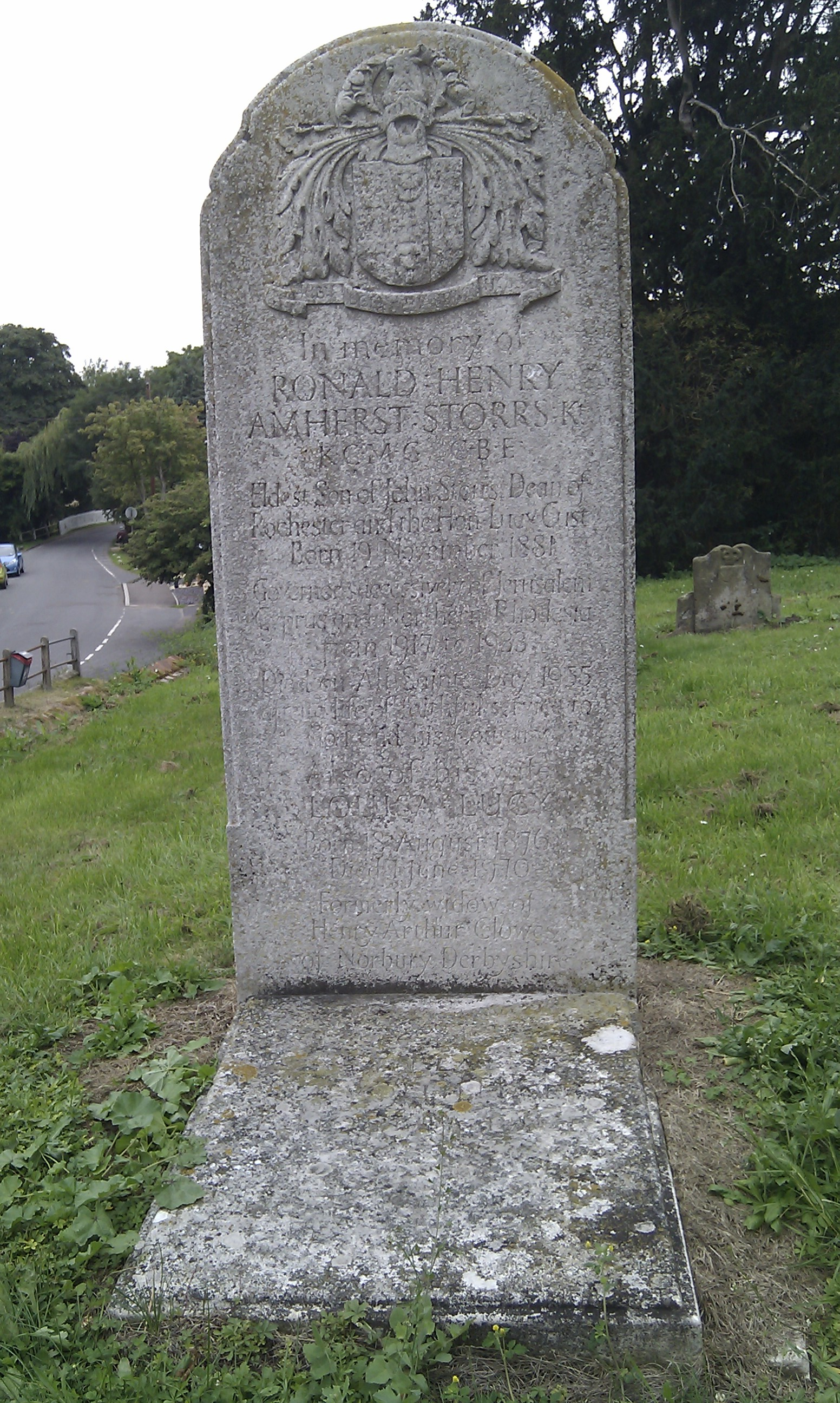
Storrs' grave stone at Pebmarsh

In 1923, Storrs married Louisa Lucy Storrs (née Littleton, formerly Clowes).

On 1 November 1955, Storrs died at St Stephen's Hospital in Chelsea aged 73. Storrs is buried at St John the Baptist Church, in Pebmarsh, Essex.

== Published books ==
- Ronald Storrs & Basil Liddell Hart (1936). Lawrence of Arabia. Corvinus Press. (limited edition of 128 copies)
- Ronald Storrs (1937). Orientations. Nicholson & Watson.
- Ronald Storrs (1940). Lawrence of Arabia, Zionism and Palestine. Penguin.
- Storrs, Ronald, Dunlop in War and Peace (Hutchinson & Co., 1946) – an account of the Dunlop Company and its importance during the Second World War.

== Sources ==
- Faught, C. Brad (2026). Ronald Storrs: Governing British Jerusalem. London: I.B. Tauris/Bloomsbury.
- Georghallides, G.S (1985). Cyprus and the governorship of Sir Ronald Storrs: The causes of the 1931 crisis (Texts and studies of the history of Cyprus). Cyprus Research Centre. ISBN 9963-0-8004-9.
- Storrs, Ronald (1972). The Memoirs of Sir Ronald Storrs. New York: Arno Press. ISBN 0-405-04593-X.
- Storrs, Ronald (1999). Middle East Politics & Diplomacy, 1904–1956:The Private Letters and Diaries of Sir Ronald Storrs (1881–1955) from Pembroke College, Cambridge. Marlborough, Wiltshire, England: Adam Matthew Publications. ISBN 1-85711-152-4.
- Storrs, Ronald (2006). A Record of the War – The Second Quarter (December 1939 – February 1940). Obscure Press. ISBN 1-84664-761-4.
- Tönnies, Moya. Colonial Diplomacy through Art. Jerusalem 1918–1926. Leiden: Brill, 2024.
