= Civil service in Sudan =

The civil service in Sudan has historically been one of the more effective civil services in Africa as a result of early British attention to development of the civil service and the premium it placed on educating government employees. Independent Sudanese governments have carried on this tradition; many Sudanese have held civil-service positions or equivalent jobs in foreign countries, especially the Arab states of the Persian Gulf, because of the reputation the civil service enjoyed. Nonetheless, public service has become increasingly politicized in recent years.

The 1998 constitution expressly provided for a civil service that was responsible for the administration of the country. It mandated a system based on merit and proportional representation from all areas of the country. The United Nations Department of Economic and Social Affairs helped the government in 2001 lay the groundwork for implementation of the National Public Service Strategy that covered the early 21st century. This program was designed to change individual behavior and the work environment for all civil servants, establish a database and information system, conduct a survey of public-service training needs, and formulate a concrete plan for the first phase of the strategy. The government began restructuring the civil service in 2002 and increased the salaries of civil servants in 2003 by 20 percent.

The Interim National Constitution created a national civil service that theoretically was based on merit, fair competition for jobs, affirmative action, and additional training for conflict-affected people. It established a National Civil Service Commission (NCSC) that advised the national government on the formulation and execution of policies related to public service employment. The constitution also called for a National Employees Justice Chamber to consider and determine grievances by national public-service employees. The national government passed the National Civil Service Act and the National Civil Service Commission Act.
