= Amnon Cohen (historian) =

Israeli historian (1936-)

- אמנון כהן
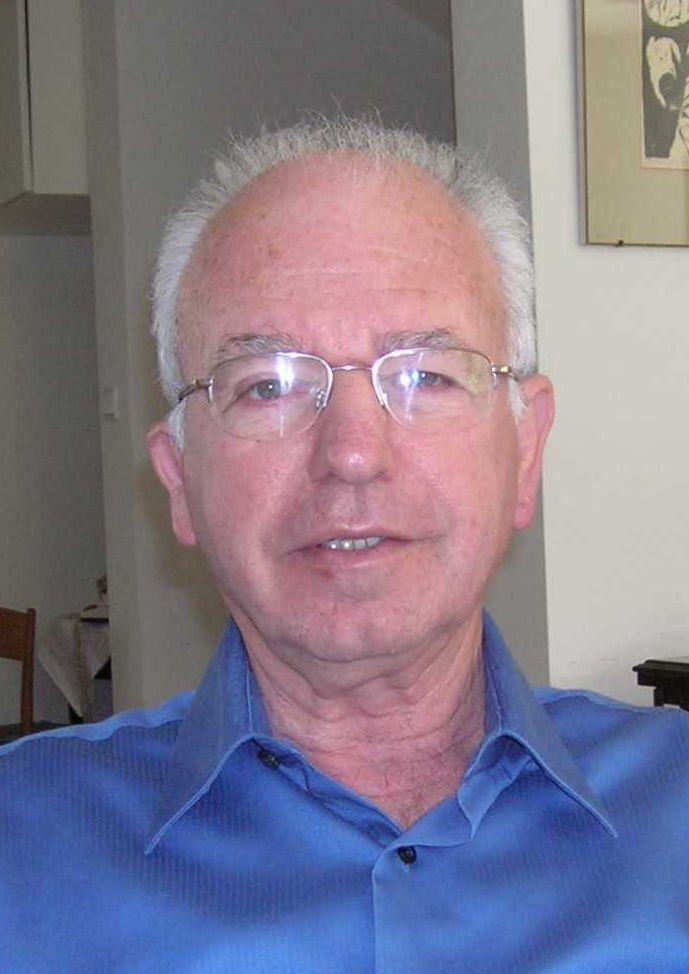
- Cohen in 2008
- Born: 1936

Academic work
- Discipline: Historian
- Sub-discipline: Middle Eastern studies

Amnon Cohen (Hebrew: אמנון כהן) is an Israeli historian specializing in Middle Eastern studies.

== Career ==
He taught at the University of Haifa until 2005.

Israeli historian Ilan Pappé described his work as having challenged the idea that Palestine had become a barren desert by 1800.

== Awards ==
In 2023, he was awarded an honorary commendation by the Turkish Academy of Sciences, the first Israeli professor to do so. He was awarded the Israel Prize in 2007.

== Selected publications ==
- Cohen, Amnon (1973). Palestine in the 18th Century: Patterns of Government and Administration. Magnes Press, Hebrew University.
- Cohen, Amnon (22 August 2002). Economic Life in Ottoman Jerusalem. Cambridge University Press. ISBN 978-0-521-52435-3.
- Cohen, Amnon (1994). A World Within: Jewish Life as Reflected in Muslim Court Documents from the Sijill of Jerusalem. University of Pennsylvania, Center for Judaic Studies. ISBN 978-0-8122-1533-5.
- Cohen, Amnon (20 December 2000). The Guilds of Ottoman Jerusalem. BRILL. ISBN 978-90-474-0064-6.
- Lewis, Bernard; Cohen, Amnon (8 March 2015). Population and Revenue in the Towns of Palestine in the Sixteenth Century. Princeton University Press. ISBN 978-1-4008-6779-0.
- Cohen, Amnon (2011). Studies on Ottoman Palestine. Variorum Collected Studies Series. Ashgate. ISBN 978-1-4094-2319-5.
