= Arab Souk (Old City) =

Large marketplace in the Old City of Jerusalem

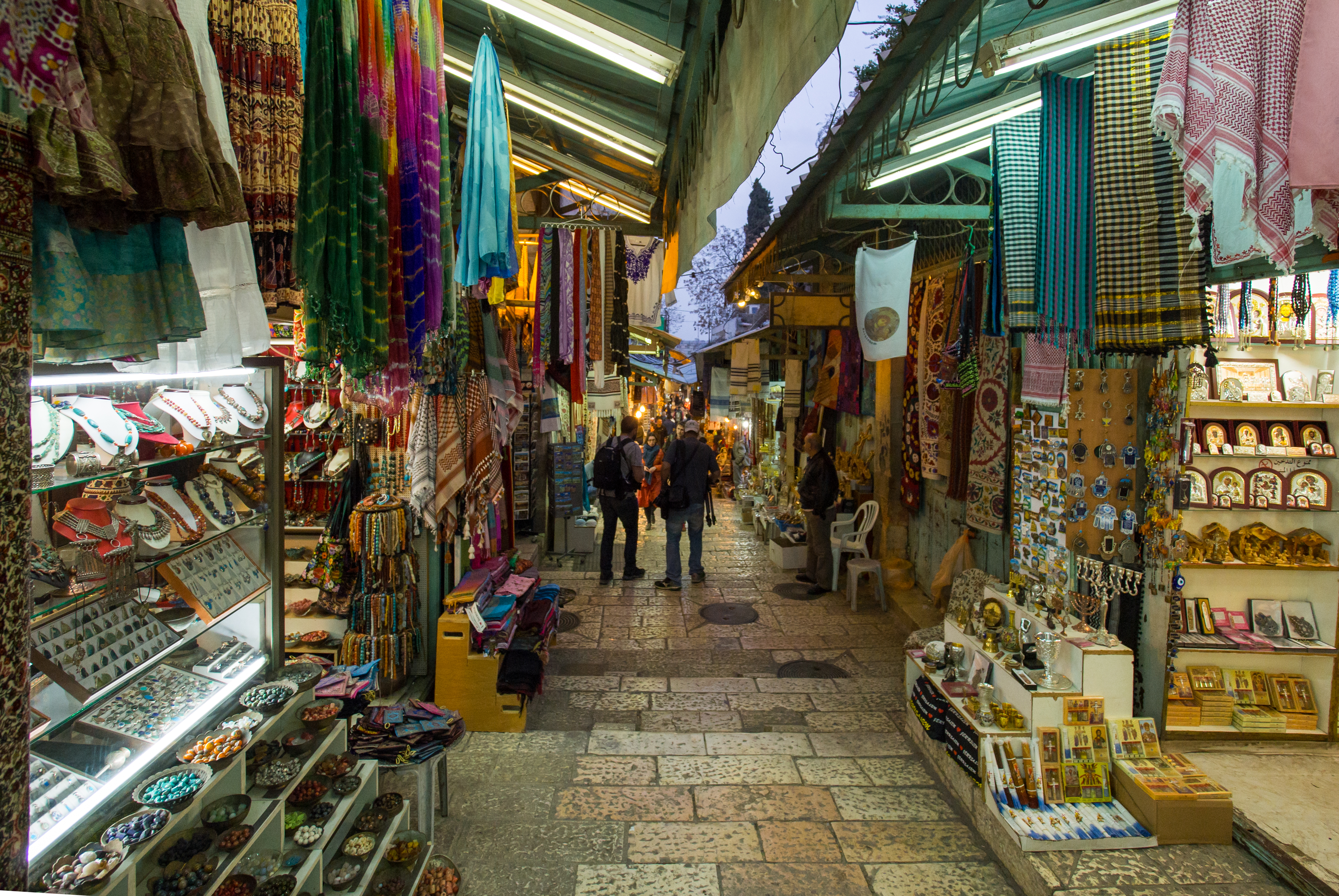
David Street (2017)

The Arab Souk, also known as the Arab Souq, or Suq El-Bazar, is a large bazaar occupying approximately 100 acres (400,000 m^{2}) of area in the Old City of Jerusalem. About 800 merchants operate a variety of businesses in closely-packed shop stalls along a network of alleyways primarily in the Muslim Quarter and the Christian Quarter, located in the northern part of the Old City. The New York Times described the market in a 1982 publishing as "an explosion of colour, movement and smell."

== David Street and Street of the Chain ==
The David Street stretch of the bazaar, running along the southern side of the Christian Quarter at the border of the Armenian Quarter, is a narrow and stepped street popular with tourists, with about 100 sellers. It connects foot traffic from the Jaffa Gate to the Street of the Chain and the Chain Gate of the Temple Mount. Though the merchants at the bazaar are predominantly Arab, its location and tourist interests bring diverse patronage.
