= Cardo (Jerusalem) =

Colonnaded avenue of late antique Jerusalem

- הקארדו (Hebrew)
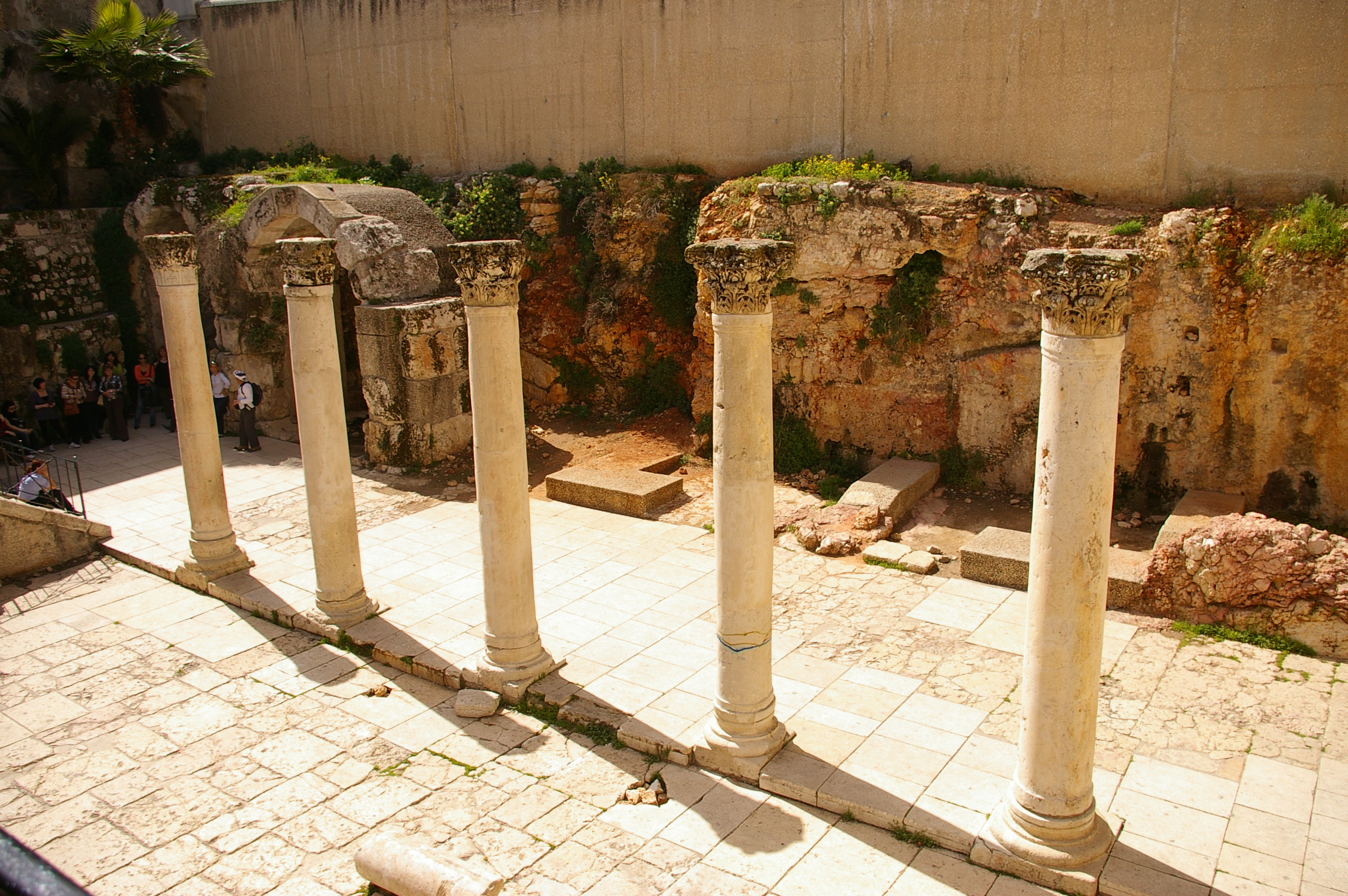
- The Open Cardo
- Interactive map of Cardo
- Type: Colonnaded street
- Periods: Roman and Byzantine periods
- Location: Old City of Jerusalem, Jerusalem

History
- Built: 120s–130s; extended in the 6th century CE
- Built by: Hadrian; extended by Justinian I

Site notes
- Architectural style: Roman urban planning (Hippodamian plan)
- Excavation dates: Excavated after the 1967 Six-Day War; additional excavations in 2005–2009
- Archaeologists: Nahman Avigad, Shlomit Weksler-Bdolah
- Condition: Partially preserved
- Public access: Yes

The Cardo was the principal north–south thoroughfare of Jerusalem during the Late Roman and Byzantine periods. Together with the east–west decumanus, it formed the two main axes of the city.

The Cardo was first paved in the Late Roman period, after Jerusalem was refounded as the colony of Aelia Capitolina, and was later extended southward under the Byzantine emperor Justinian in the 6th century CE.

Substantial remains of the Cardo have been excavated in the Old City of Jerusalem, both in the Jewish Quarter and near the Western Wall Plaza, and a restored section is today a shopping street and tourist site.

== Eastern Cardo ==
=== History ===
The Cardo was first constructed as part of the establishment of Aelia Capitolina, the Roman colony founded by the emperor Hadrian on the site of Jerusalem, which had been destroyed by Titus during the First Jewish Revolt, in 70 CE. A Hadrianic coin recovered beneath the paving sets an earliest possible date, while the absence of finds later than 130 CE suggests the street was paved by about then. Pottery and glass from a sealed refuse deposit beneath the street's infrastructure point to the same period, leading excavators to propose a construction date of roughly 120–130 CE. This chronology suggests that the city's layout, and perhaps construction of the Eastern Cardo itself, was already underway before Hadrian's visit to Jerusalem in 129/130 CE, when he announced the foundation of the new colony.

Despite its scale, the finished street lacks the refinement typical of Roman public works: paving stones and columns were only minimally smoothed, column bases roughly worked, and the bedrock beneath the western portico left unlevelled. According to Weksler-Bdolah, this likely indicates that work was cut short, perhaps by Hadrian's visit or the outbreak of the Bar Kokhba Revolt in 132 CE, which diverted labour from civilian projects.

The eastern Cardo ran in a straight line parallel to the Temple Mount's Western Wall, cutting across the earlier topography of the city. Earlier structures had developed along the natural southeast–northwest slope of the western hill, but the Cardo's builders disregarded this terrain in accordance with Roman preferences for regular orthogonal street grids. The street had symmetrical porticos, a uniform row of shops, and two side streets branching eastward.

Fragments of the street's pavement have also been found at various points along modern Al-Wad (HaGai) Street, which preserves its ancient course.

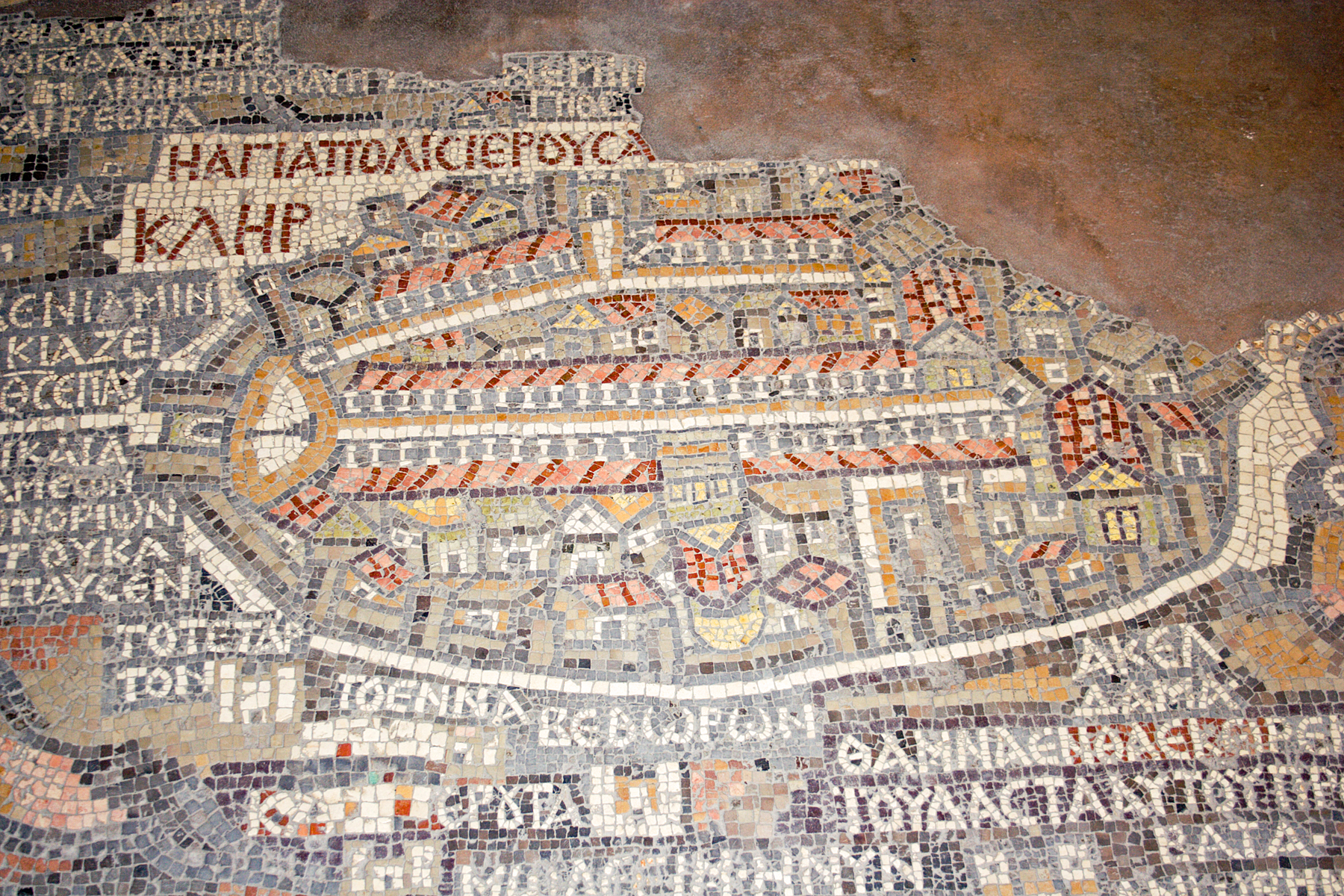
The Cardo in the Byzantine period on the Madaba map

During the Byzantine period, significant developments were made to the Cardo in Jerusalem. In the 6th century CE, under the reign of Emperor Justinian, the Cardo was extended further south from its original Roman layout. This extension reached the Church of the Holy Sepulchre and continued to Zion Gate. The Byzantine Cardo maintained the colonnaded design of its Roman predecessor, featuring a central open-air passage flanked by sidewalks and shops. Excavations have revealed a Byzantine level on the southern side of the Cardo, which included restored columns and other architectural elements. The Madaba Map, a 6th-century mosaic map found in a Byzantine church in Madaba, Jordan, prominently depicts the Cardo, underscoring its importance in the city's layout during this period.

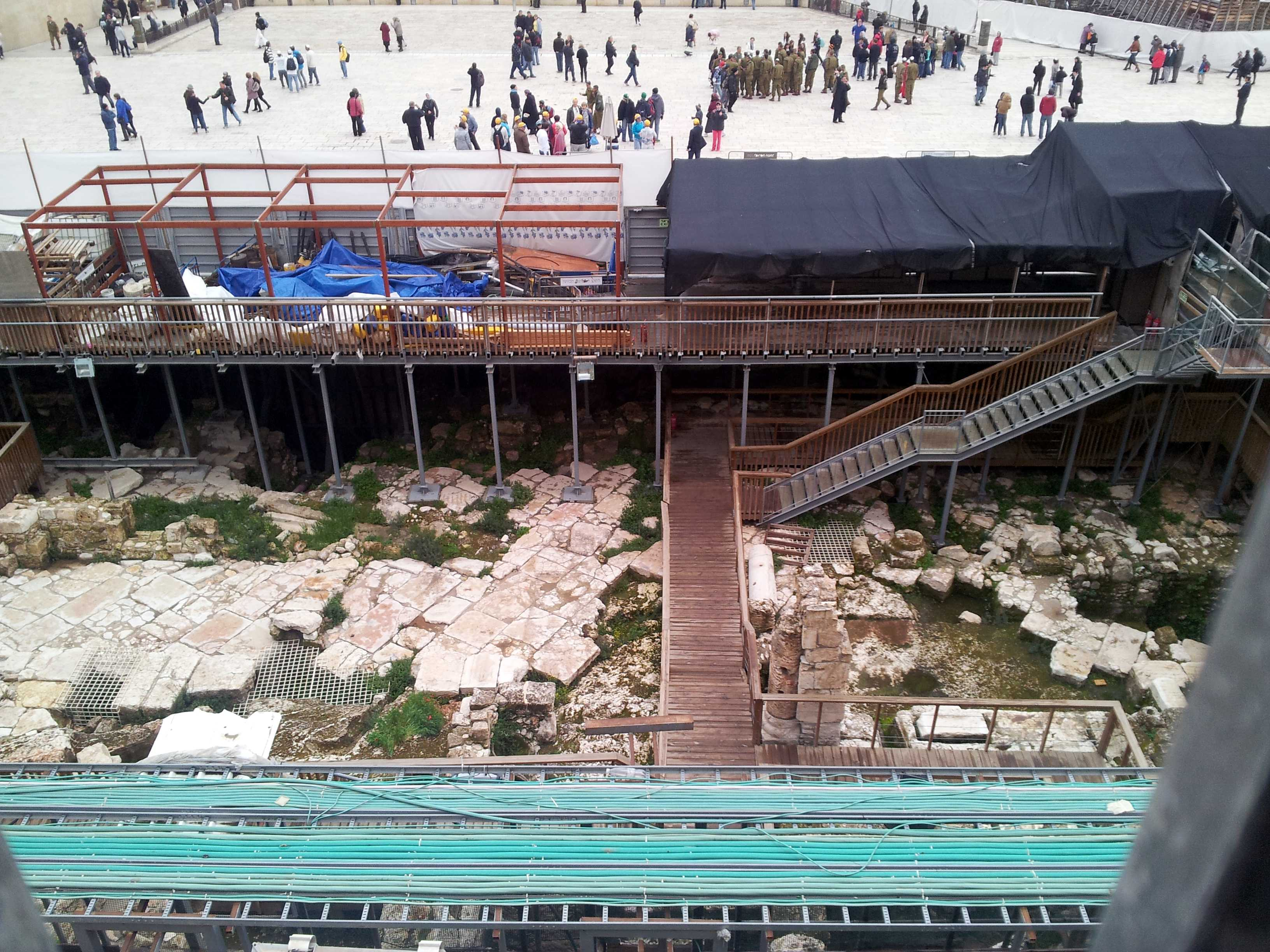
The restored avenue of columns in the southern part of the cardo

=== Archaeological discoveries ===
Significant archaeological discoveries related to the Cardo in Jerusalem were made during excavations conducted by Nahman Avigad's team in the 1970s. These excavations uncovered a 200-meter-long section of the Cardo in the Jewish Quarter, dating back to the Byzantine period under Emperor Justinian. The remains of the Cardo, found four meters below the present-day street level, revealed a broad street flanked by colonnades and covered passageways. The street was divided by two rows of stone columns, with shops lining the southwestern part and more shops located behind an arcade of arches on the eastern side. The columns, made of hard limestone, were found in fragments and have since been reconstructed in their original positions. The well-hewn paving stones, laid in parallel rows, exhibit signs of age and wear. These findings corroborate the depiction of the Cardo on the Madaba Map, a 6th-century mosaic map that guided archaeologists in their search for Byzantine Jerusalem's remains.

A small nine-branched menorah, measuring approximately 8 centimetres (3.1 in) × 7 centimetres (2.8 in), was incised near the western edge of the Hadrianic eastern cardo. Two adjacent incisions have been tentatively identified as a lulav and an etrog. The engravings are thought to date to the early Muslim period.

== Western Cardo ==
Jerusalem's other main colonnaded street, the Western Cardo, was similar in scale to the eastern Cardo. It measured about 12 m wide at the carriageway, reaching 24 m with its porticos. Only its southern section has been excavated, and that section dates to the 6th century CE; a northern stretch, along the modern Khan ez-Zeit/Bet Ḥabad Street, was documented in the 1940s.

== Modern restoration ==
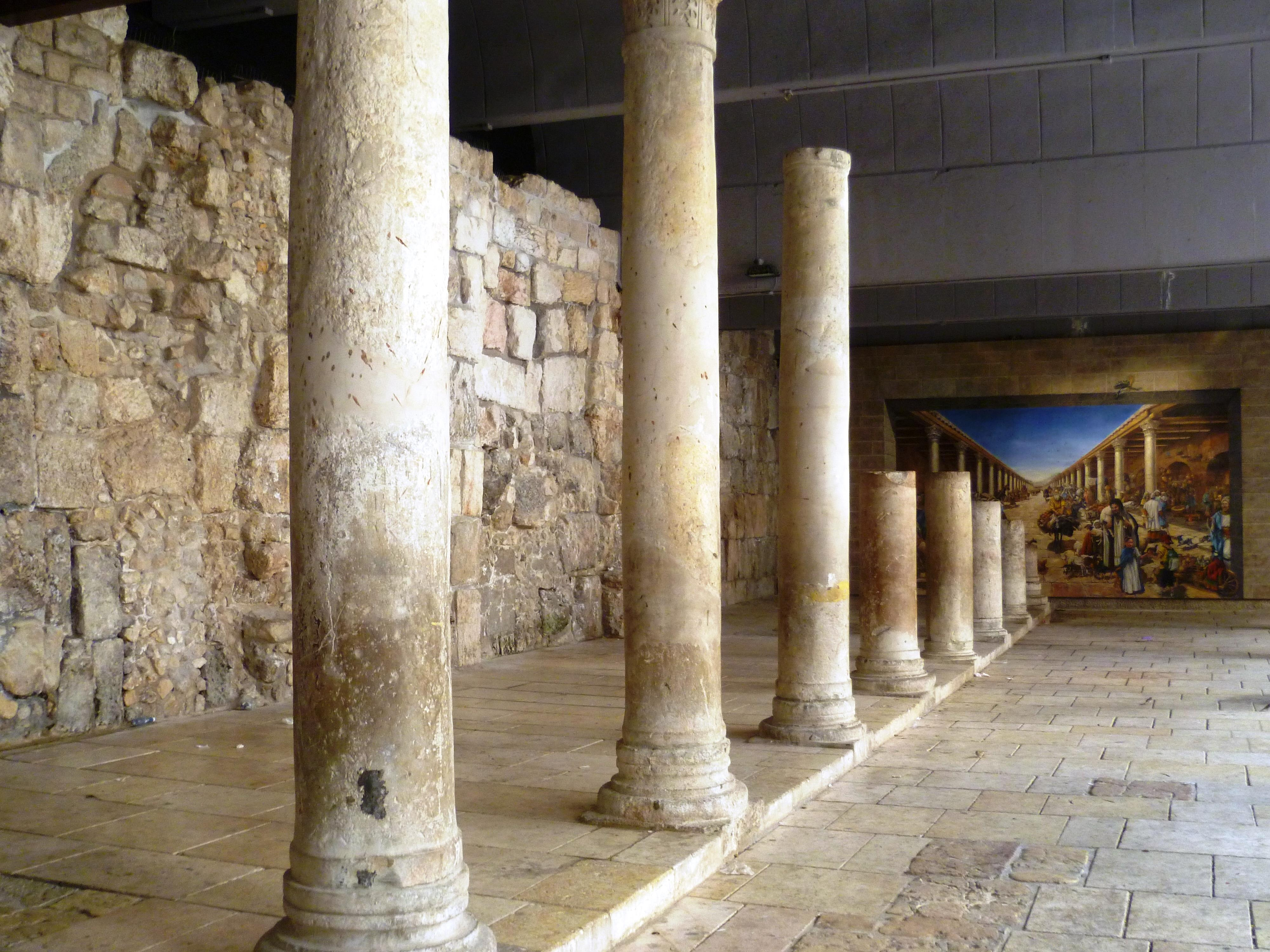
Another part of the cardo

The modern restoration of the Cardo in Jerusalem began following its rediscovery during excavations in the Jewish Quarter in 1969. The restoration plan, heavily influenced by the depiction of the Cardo on the Madaba Map, aimed to preserve the ancient street's historical integrity while incorporating contemporary materials. A portion of the Cardo has been rebuilt as a covered shopping arcade, reflecting the style of an ancient Roman street. This restored section serves as a modern shopping lane, with stores housed in the ancient Crusader-era shops. The restoration has transformed the Cardo into a lively touristic area, maintaining its historical significance while adapting it for contemporary use.

== See also ==
- Cardo
- Burnt House
- Herodian Quarter

== Bibliography ==
=== Sources ===
- Weksler-Bdolah, Shlomit; Szanton, Nahshon (2026). "Menorah Graffiti on the Streets of Jerusalem". 'Atiqot. 120 (1): 4, 16, 18–19. doi:10.70967/2948-040X.2413. ISSN 2948-040X.
- Weksler-Bdolah, Shlomit (2019). "The Cardo in Urban Context". In Weksler-Bdolah, Shlomit; Onn, Alexander (eds.). Jerusalem: Western Wall Plaza Excavations I: The Roman and Byzantine Remains: Architecture and Stratigraphy. IAA Reports. Vol. 63. Jerusalem: Israel Antiquities Authority. ISBN 9789654066945.
