= Fulk V of Anjou =

King of Jerusalem from 1131 to 1143

Fulk
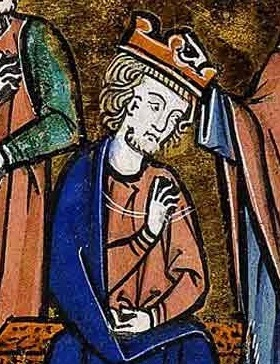

King of Jerusalem
- Reign: 1131–1143
- Predecessor: Baldwin II
- Successors: Melisende and Baldwin III
- Co-ruler: Melisende

Count of Anjou
- Reign: 1106–1129
- Predecessors: Fulk IV and Geoffrey IV
- Successor: Geoffrey V
- Co-ruler: Fulk IV (1106–1109)
- Born: 1089 or 1090
- Died: 10 November 1143; Acre, then part of the Kingdom of Jerusalem
- Burial: Church of the Holy Sepulchre, Jerusalem
- Spouses: Eremburga, Countess of Maine; Melisende, Queen of Jerusalem
- Issue: Geoffrey V, Count of Anjou; Sibylla, Countess of Flanders; Matilda, Duchess of Normandy; Elias II, Count of Maine; Baldwin III, King of Jerusalem; Amalric, King of Jerusalem
- House: Anjou-Châteaudun
- Father: Fulk IV, Count of Anjou
- Mother: Bertrada of Montfort

Fulk (French: Foulque or Foulques; 1089 or 1090 – 10 November 1143) was the count of Anjou (known as Fulk V or the Younger) from 1106 until 1129 and the king of Jerusalem from 1131 until 1143.

Fulk was born to Count Fulk IV of Anjou and Bertrada of Montfort. He became co-count with his father after the death of his half-brother Geoffrey IV in 1106 and sole count upon his father's death in 1109. Through his marriage with Countess Eremburga, he also became count of Maine in 1110. Fulk's rule in Anjou was marked both by baronial uprisings and a prolonged conflict with King Henry I of England. Eremburga had a prominent place in Fulk's government until her death in 1126. In 1127, Fulk negotiated the marriage of their son, Geoffrey V, to Henry's daughter and heir presumptive, Matilda. In 1129, he relinquished Anjou to Geoffrey and moved to Jerusalem to marry Melisende, daughter and heir presumptive of King Baldwin II of Jerusalem.

Fulk became king upon Baldwin II's death in 1131. The nobles of Antioch recognized him as regent in the name of their young princess, Constance, but he had to defeat Constance's mother, Princess Alice, and Count Pons of Tripoli to enforce his claim to the regency. He enjoyed a cordial relationship with Pons after saving him from Turks in 1133 and remained involved in the defense of crusader states from the ambitious Turkic leader Imad al-Din Zengi throughout the first half of his reign. He excluded Melisende from power early on and faced a rebellion of her kinsman Hugh II of Jaffa in 1134. He defeated Hugh, but Melisende forced him to share rule with her henceforth.

After losing Montferrand to Zengi in 1137, Fulk concentrated on strengthening the defenses of his own kingdom, especially on the southern border with Fatimid Egypt. He deferred to Melisende on Church matters and supported her patronage interests. In 1142, he deftly avoided a confrontation with Emperor John II Komnenos, but both men died in hunting accidents the following year.

== Youth ==
Fulk was born in late 1089 or 1090, shortly after the marriage of his parents, Count Fulk IV of Anjou and Bertrada of Montfort. Fulk IV had children from prior marriages, including his heir apparent, Geoffrey IV. In 1092, Countess Bertrade eloped with King Philip I of France; as both were married, their union was widely condemned as bigamy. Fulk likely spent his childhood at the court of his much older paternal half-sister Duchess Ermengarde of Brittany, with whom he developed a close relationship that lasted throughout their lives; he also appears to have regarded her husband, Duke Alan Fergant, as a father figure. While the counts of Anjou had long prized education, Fulk was the first member of the family known to have had a dedicated tutor. His tutor was a landed knight called Adam, probably a Breton, whom Fulk came to cherish. Fulk returned to the Angevin court at Angiers with Adam in 1098.

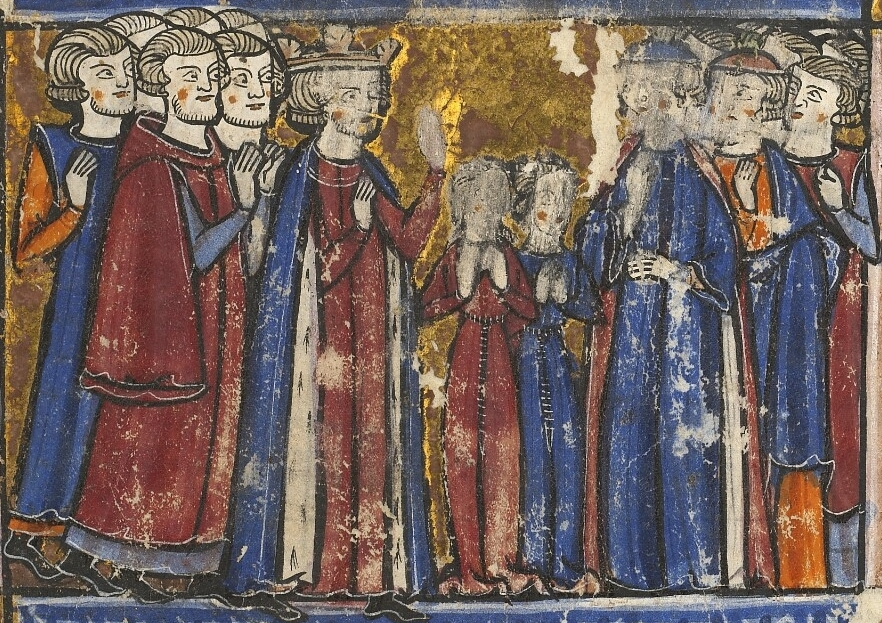
Many French princes backed the First Crusade; King Philip married two daughters, including Fulk's half-sister Cecile, to crusaders.

In 1095, Pope Urban II travelled and preached the First Crusade among the Franks of northern France. By 1099, the Frankish crusaders defeated the Muslim rulers of the Levant and established four crusader states: the Kingdom of Jerusalem, the Principality of Antioch, and the counties of Edessa and Tripoli. Fulk IV's failure to participate earned him the contempt of his vassals and other contemporaries. Between 1103 and 1105, his son and heir, Geoffrey, rebelled against him with the help of Count Elias I of Maine–an Angevin vassal and the father of Geoffrey's betrothed, Eremburga–and forced the old count to share the comital authority. The younger Fulk was becoming prominent in their father's acts, and Geoffrey may have felt threatened; according to the Annals of Saint-Aubin, the old count had intended to disinherit Geoffrey and instate the younger Fulk as his heir. Fulk may have then been sent to the court of King Philip and Queen Bertrada as part of the settlement between his father and half-brother. In early 1106, King Philip arranged for two of his daughters to marry leading crusaders: Constance wed Prince Bohemond I of Antioch, while Cecile–daughter of Bertrada and half-sister of Fulk–married Bohemond's nephew Tancred.

Geoffrey died on 19 May 1106, killed by an arrow while besieging a rebellious vassal. According to Orderic Vitalis, Fulk received the news of his half-brother's death at the royal court and was forced to recognize that he would hold Anjou from the king. Philip chose Duke William IX of Aquitaine, who happened to be attending the court, to escort Fulk to Anjou. William instead kidnapped Fulk and demanded the fortress of Mirebeau from Fulk's father in return for Fulk's freedom. William of Tyre says that Fulk was already at William IX's court, serving as the duke's cupbearer, when Geoffrey died. The same year, Philip arrived in Angiers with Bertrada, enforcing royal rights over Anjou. Despite his mother's intercession, Fulk remained in custody–ill-treated, according to Orderic–until his father agreed to William's demand in 1107.

Fulk's family and stepfamily

previous wives	Fulk IV of Anjou	Bertrada of Montfort	Philip I of France	Bertha of Holland
Alan IV of Brittany	Ermengarde of Anjou	Geoffrey IV of Anjou	Eremburga of Maine	Fulk V of Anjou	Philip of Mantes	Florus of Nangis	Cecile of France	Tancred of Galilee	Louis VI of France	Constance of France	Bohemond I of Antioch
Conan III of Brittany	Matilda of Anjou	Geoffrey V of Anjou	Sibylla of Anjou	Elias II of Maine	Bohemond II of Antioch

== Count ==
=== Comital government ===
Fulk's reign saw the beginning of rapid Angevin expansion, starting with the acquisition of Maine in 1110.

In the aftermath of Geoffrey's death, Fulk V became co-count with his father, but comital authority in Anjou collapsed when Elias of Maine stepped in and started restoring order. Fulk's stepfather, King Philip, died on 29 July 1108. By that time, Fulk had married Elias's daughter and heir, Eremburga. Fulk became the sole count of Anjou upon the death of his father on 14 April 1109. When his father-in-law died on 11 July 1110, he became count of Maine as well, by right of his wife.

Fulk's mother, Queen Bertrada–banished from the royal court by King Philip's son and successor, Louis VI–returned to Anjou and became one of Fulk's closest advisers. After Bertrada arrived with her and King Philip's sons, Philip and Florus, Fulk introduced to the Angevin court a number of prestigious offices associated with the French royal court. Countess Eremburga did not initially have a prominent role in Fulk's government, probably because of a series of pregnancies. The couple had two daughters, Matilda and Sibylla, and two sons, Geoffrey and Elias. Eremburga eventually became closely involved in the comital government, with official narratives presenting the relationship as one of love and affection.

=== Baronial unrest ===
Fulk worked to centralize power, an endeavor his vassals resented. He faced several rebellions in his first years and dealt with them decisively. In 1109, he besieged and subdued the castellans of Doué-la-Fontaine and L'Île-Bouchard; around the same time, he also brought to heel the castellan of Montrichard.

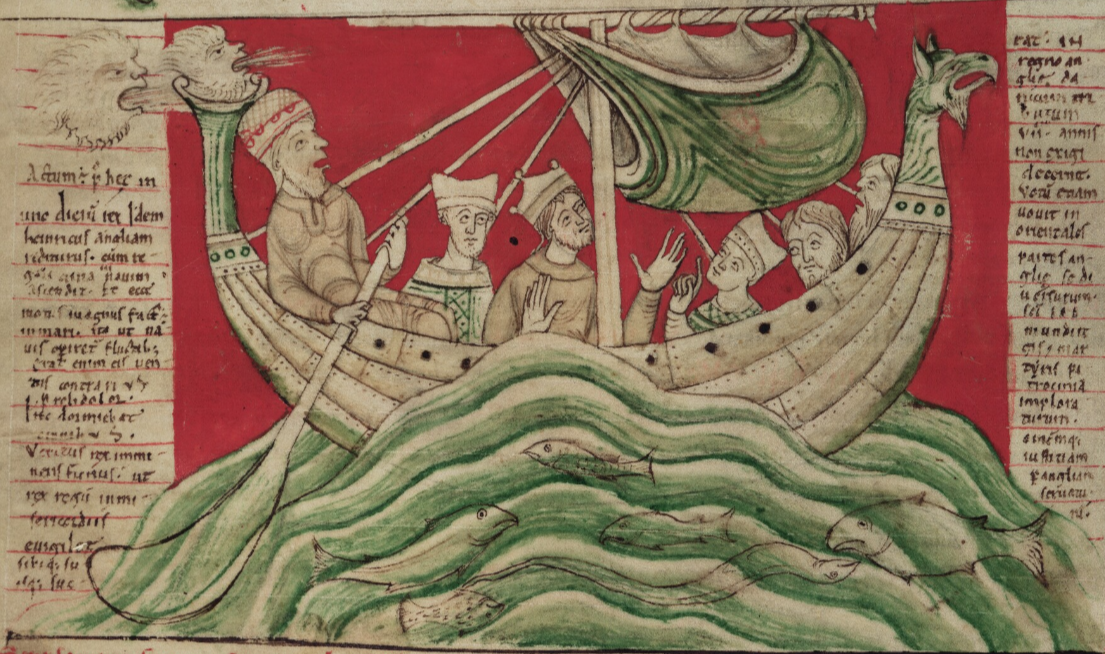
Fulk spent much of his rule in Anjou dealing with the designs of Henry I of England.

In the 1110s, King Louis and a number of barons of northern France waged wars against King Henry I of England, who ruled the vast Duchy of Normandy to the north of Anjou. Fulk's point of contention with Henry was Maine: the dukes of Normandy had long claimed either suzerainty or direct control over the county. Whereas Elias had been a friend and vassal of Henry, Fulk refused to do homage to Henry for Maine. An armed conflict erupted between them in 1111, and Henry quickly took the frontier fortress of Alençon. He won allies through bribes, intrigues, and marital alliances, and soon many nobles from Maine went over to his side. In 1112, Fulk had to put down another rebellion (possibly instigated by Henry), reducing the castellan of Brissac-Quincé. This prevented him from joining cause with King Louis and Henry's other enemies. In late February 1113, Fulk met Henry near Alençon and did homage for Maine; he also betrothed his daughter Matilda to William Adelin, Henry's sole legitimate son and heir apparent.

The Annals of Saint-Aubin report that in 1114, a coalition of unnamed barons staged a particularly devastating uprising against Fulk. It is possible that Fulk's otherwise undated siege of Preuilly-sur-Claise was part of this war. The following six years saw only one rebellion, that of John of Montbazon, whom Fulk subdued in 1118.

Fulk was encouraged to donate to the Church by his half-sister Ermengarde. In the 1100s, he was a major patron of the Fontevraud Abbey, a newly established double monastery in Maine. Around 1116, his mother joined the community as a nun and died there in 1119. The same year, Matilda married William Adelin.

=== Crusading and diplomacy ===
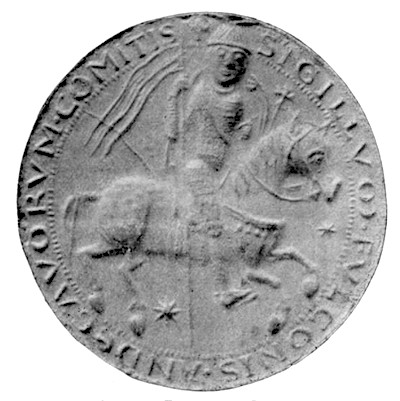
Fulk's effigy on his seal

Throughout the first decade of his rule, Fulk sought to involve his family in the crusading movement by recruiting crusaders and employing them in the comital bureaucracy. In 1120, Fulk became a major sponsor of the Knights Templar and decided to undertake an armed pilgrimage to Jerusalem. Fulk entrusted his land and his son, Geoffrey, to Saint Julian, patron of Le Mans Cathedral; overcome with emotion, he left Geoffrey on the cathedral's altar before departing with a large army some time after 2 May. During his absence, Eremburga ruled their territories alone. For a year, Fulk maintained in Palestine a force of 100 knights at his own expense, which left a favorable impression on the barons of the kingdom. While Fulk was on his pilgrimage, William Adelin died in the sinking of the White Ship in November 1120. King Henry was left without an obvious heir, and the problem of Maine was raised once again; By 21 September 1121, Fulk had returned to Anjou.

Fulk sent messengers to Henry in late 1122 to demand the return of Matilda's dowry–lands, towns, and castles–but they were rebuffed. Fulk responded by having his other daughter, Sibylla, marry William Clito, Henry's nephew and contender for the Duchy of Normandy, and he gave them Maine as Sibylla's dowry. Between 1122 and 1124, Fulk reconciled with the lords of Trèves and Amboise, who had avoided the comital court for decades after falling out with his father.

At Henry's request, the papal curia annulled Sibylla's marriage with William Clito on the grounds of consanguinity in 1124. Fulk was so infuriated that he burned the papal letter, imprisoned the envoys, and scorched their hair and beards. For this, he was excommunicated and his lands placed under interdict. At this time–and possibly in response to the ecclesiastical sanctions against Fulk–the lord of Montreuil-Bellay rebelled. Fulk prevailed, and he faced no further rebellions in Anjou. The interdict remained in place until at least 12 April 1125.

Eremburga fell ill in late 1126. Fulk summoned Abbot John of Saint-Nicholas, his friend and personal physician, to attend her at the comital castle of Baugé. She died in late December 1126 (or possibly early January 1127). On 1 January 1127, King Henry recognized his widowed daughter Empress Matilda as his heir presumptive. Later that year, at the insistence of King Louis, the nobles of Flanders elected William Clito to be their count. Fearing that William would be in a position to make good his claim on Normandy, Henry once again allied with Fulk, betrothing Empress Matilda to Fulk's son and heir apparent, Geoffrey.

=== Royal marriage ===
The Kingdom of Jerusalem was one of four crusader states established by the Franks by 1102.

In late 1127, an assembly of noblemen in the Kingdom of Jerusalem agreed to offer to Fulk the hand in marriage of Melisende, the eldest daughter of King Baldwin II of Jerusalem, and prospective kingship with it; Baldwin had four daughters–Melisende, Alice, Hodierna, and Ioveta–but no sons and, after the recent death of Queen Morphia, did not expect to sire any. An embassy consisting of William of Bures, prince of Galilee, and Guy I Brisebarre, lord of Beirut, arrived early next year in France. After consulting with King Louis, the envoys appeared in Anjou, where they had not been expected. They promised to Fulk, under solemn oath, that he would be married to Melisende within 50 days of his arrival in the kingdom. On 29 May 1128, Pope Honorius II wrote a letter to King Baldwin recommending Fulk. Two days later, Fulk took the cross, and on 17 June, Geoffrey married Empress Matilda. Fulk then associated him in ruling Anjou. The same year, Fulk's daughter Matilda became a nun at Fontevraud.

It was probably Fulk who, following the example of Empress Matilda's formal elevation, insisted that Melisende's place in succession be affirmed before he would commit to marry her; by early 1129, Melisende was explicitly titled "heir to the kingdom" in her father's charters. When Fulk departed Anjou for good in February 1129, he relinquished his lands to Geoffrey, but retained the comital title. Fulk arrived in the Kingdom of Jerusalem with the embassy–and a sizeable force of knights and infantrymen–in May 1129. By 2 June, he had married Melisende. As Melisende's dowry, the couple received the lucrative cities of Acre and Tyre.

Fulk actively assisted King Baldwin governing the kingdom. Soon after his arrival and marriage, he joined Baldwin's effort to capture Damascus from its Muslim ruler, Taj al-Muluk Buri. Also present were the rulers of the other three crusader states: Prince Bohemond II of Antioch and Counts Joscelin I of Edessa and Pons of Tripoli. Pons and Bohemond were Fulk's brothers-in-law: the former was the second husband of Fulk's half-sister Cecilia of France; the latter had married Melisende's sister Alice. The expedition was aided by the acquisition of Banias from the Order of the Assassins. On their way to Damascus, a heavy storm made the city's surroundings impassable, and the crusaders turned back.

Bohemond was killed in a skirmish with Turks in February 1130. His heir was his minor daughter, Constance, the only child born from his marriage to Baldwin's daughter Alice. Alice at once assumed regency, but Baldwin marched to Antioch with Joscelin and Fulk to replace her. Alice shut the gates of Antioch before them, but after a few days, Fulk and Joscelin were admitted into the city by a knight, William of Aversa, and a monk, Peter Latinator. Baldwin was thus able to enter the city the next day. Baldwin banished Alice to her dower lands, centered on Latakia and Jabala, and entrusted the government of the principality and custody of Constance to Joscelin before returning to Jerusalem. In the first half of 1130, Fulk and Melisende had their first son, Baldwin.

Fulk's place within the ruling family of the crusader states

Bertrada of Montfort	Melisende of Montlhéry	Alice of Montlhéry	Isabella of Montlhéry
Morphia of Melitene	Baldwin II of Jerusalem	Cecile of France	Pons of Tripoli	Hugh I of Jaffa	Joscelin I of Edessa
Fulk V of Anjou	Melisende of Jerusalem	Alice of Jerusalem	Bohemond II of Antioch	Hodierna of Jerusalem	Raymond II of Tripoli	Ioveta of Jerusalem	Hugh II of Jaffa	Joscelin II of Edessa
Baldwin III of Jerusalem	Amalric of Jerusalem	Constance of Antioch	Raymond of Poitiers

== King ==
=== Antiochene affairs ===
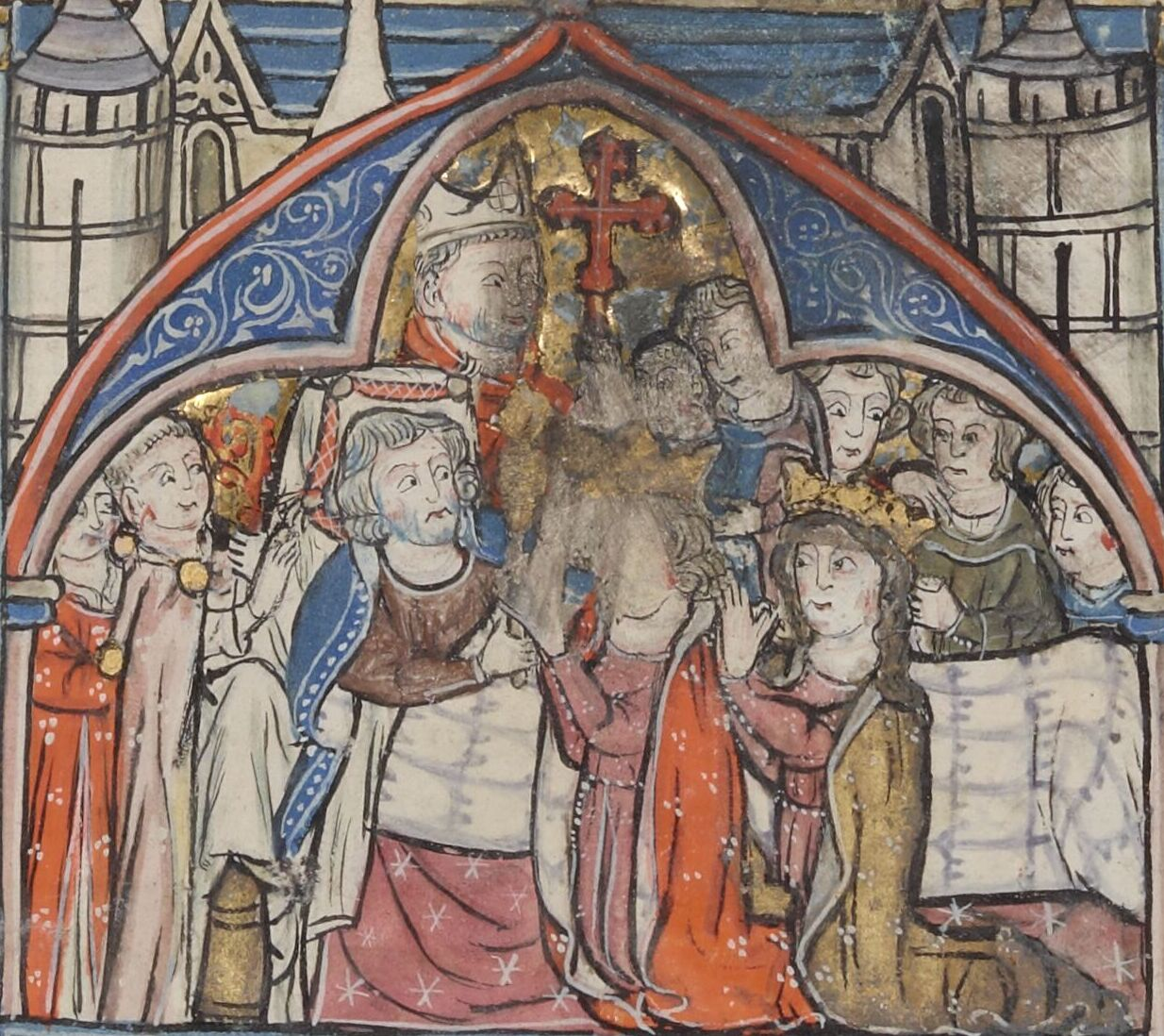
On his deathbed, Baldwin II bequeathed the kingdom to Fulk, Melisende, and their son.

After falling gravely ill following his intervention in Antioch in 1130, Baldwin II returned to Jerusalem, where Melisende and Fulk witnessed one of his final acts: a donation to the priory of the Holy Sepulchre. In August 1131, the dying king summoned the couple and their infant son, Baldwin, to the residence of the Latin patriarch and entrusted them with the kingdom before his death on 21 August. Fulk and Melisende were crowned in the Church of the Holy Sepulchre on 14 September, becoming the first monarchs to receive their crowns there. The Arab chronicler Ibn al-Qalanisi portrays Fulk as an incompetent successor of a successful king:

After him there was none left amongst them possessed of sound judgment and capacity to govern. His place was taken after him by the new Count-King, the Comte d'Anjou, who came to them by sea from their country, but he was not sound in his judgment nor was he successful in his administration, so that by the loss of Baldwin they were thrown into confusion and discordance.

Confusion and discordance did follow Fulk's accession. Joscelin I of Edessa, to whom Baldwin II had entrusted Antioch, died within weeks of the king. Alice promptly seized power again with the backing of the Antiochene baron William of Saone and Counts Pons of Tripoli and Joscelin II of Edessa. This was a challenge to Fulk's authority, as Counts Joscelin I of Edessa and Bertrand of Tripoli had sworn fealty to King Baldwin I in 1109. Alice's opponents appealed to Fulk and in 1132, he marched towards Antioch. Because Pons denied him passage through Tripoli, he was forced to sail from Beirut to the principality's Port Saint Symeon. Fulk and Pons then engaged in a protracted and bitter battle of Rugia. Fulk prevailed and was able to claim regency in Antioch. In December 1132, during Fulk's absence, Shams al-Muluk Duqaq of Damascus retook Banias, which came as a shock to the Franks. Before returning to Jerusalem, he entrusted the government of the principality to its constable, Rainald I Masoir.

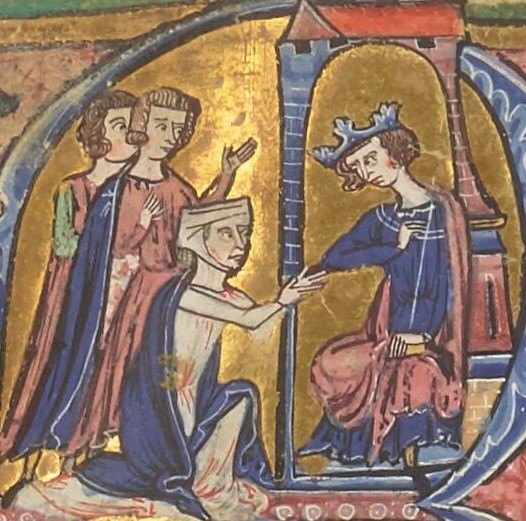
At his half-sister's request, Fulk marched to rescue her husband, his erstwhile enemy.

While Antioch was without a prince, the Turkic leader Imad al-Din Zengi emerged as the chief threat to the Franks in the Levant. In early 1133, the Antiochenes appealed to Fulk to save them from Sawar, who governed Aleppo in Zengi's name and who was preparing to attack the principality. While marching north to defend Antioch, Fulk was met at Sidon by his half-sister Countess Cecilia, who informed him that Pons was besieged by Turks at Montferrand. At Cecilia's request, Fulk marched to Montferrand and the Turks left; Fulk henceforth enjoyed a cordial relationship with Pons. The king then reached Antioch, where he learned that Sawar had raided Edessene territory and was ready to attack the principality. Fulk cautiously waited a few days before launching a surprise night attack on Sawar's camp at Qinnasrin. Sawar retreated, but the Muslims were victorious in subsequent skirmishes. Their attacks on Antioch resumed as soon as Fulk returned to Jerusalem in mid-1133. The following year, Fulk captured for Antioch the fortress of Qusair.

=== Discord and uprising ===
Fulk had scarcely become king when he invited his half-sister Ermengarde join him in his kingdom. He appointed Angevins to key offices and castellanies, and at the same time endeavored–in contravention of both his marriage contract and Baldwin II's wishes–to exclude Melisende from power. According to William of Tyre, who recorded the events decades later, it was the viscount of Jerusalem, Rohard the Elder, who pushed the king to sideline the queen. The established nobility were dismayed by Fulk's appointments of Angevin newcomers and may have hoped to retain royal favor by forcing Fulk to share power with his wife. Some of William's informants told him that Fulk was enraged by Melisende's intimacy with Hugh II of Jaffa, a powerful vassal who was also her cousin; others discounted the rumors of marital infidelity and attributed Fulk's ire to Hugh's arrogance and disobedience.

In 1134, William narrates, Fulk incited Hugh's stepson Walter I of Caesarea to accuse Hugh in open court of plotting to murder the king. Hugh denied the accusation and Walter challenged him to prove his innocence in a trial by combat. When the day came, Hugh did not appear, and was thus declared guilty by default. Under the kingdom's law, a vassal lord guilty of high treason could have his fief confiscated. Hugh had the support of his vassals until he allied with the Muslims of Ascalon, at which point the other lords went over to Fulk's side. The king then laid siege to Jaffa, but the patriarch, William of Malines, intervened to secure peace. A deal was struck by which Hugh and his remaining supporters would be exiled for three years and afterwards be allowed to return and reclaim their fiefs; during those three years, Fulk was to enjoy the revenues of Hugh's lands.

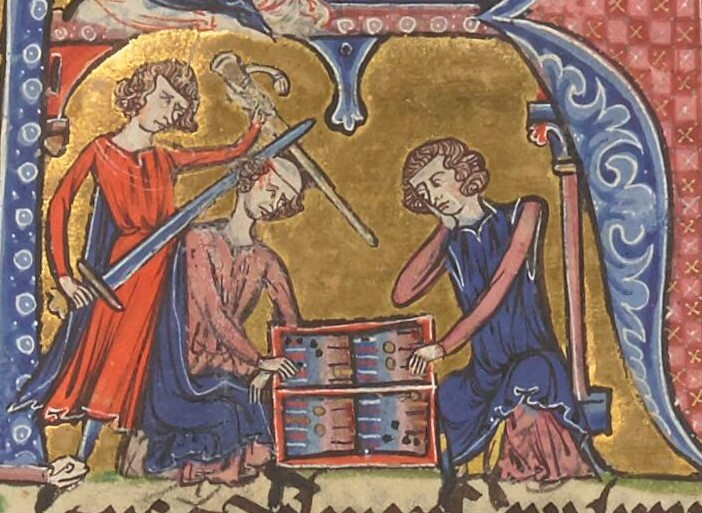
Fulk was widely suspected of having ordered the failed assassination of his vanquished enemy.

Hugh was stabbed by a Breton knight while waiting for the ship to Italy, and suspicion immediately fell on Fulk. The perpetrator was apprehended, but did not implicate Fulk; he only confessed that he had hoped to win the king's favor. The incident damaged Fulk's reputation and shattered his relationship with Melisende, who was so incensed that Fulk feared for his life and his partisans did not dare to be in her presence. Possibly for this reason, Fulk spent at least a part of 1135 in Antioch, ruling the principality as "governor and guardian". Antioch urgently needed a new prince; while Alice tried to arrange for Constance to marry Manuel, son of the Byzantine Emperor John II Komnenos, Fulk and the Antiochene nobility secretly sent for Raymond, son of Fulk's erstwhile captor Duke William IX of Aquitaine. About the time Fulk's attempt at sole rule failed, his half-sister returned to Brittany.

=== Reconciliation ===
Fulk and Melisende's reconciliation was effected by third parties. Fulk may have been convinced to share power with the queen since she had the support of the Church. He returned from Antioch in late 1135; soon after, the couple conceived their second son, Amalric. With persistence, Fulk obtained Melisende's pardon for Rohard and his other supporters, who were then again welcome to court. William reports that from then on, Fulk never did anything without his wife's consent. Around this time, Alice again seized power in Antioch; at Melisende's request, Fulk did not intervene. Shortly after, Raymond arrived and married Constance, relieving Fulk of responsibility for Antioch.

... a ruddy man, ... faithful and gentle, affable, kind, and compassionate, unusual traits in people of that complexion. In works of piety and the giving of alms, he was most generous. Even before he was called to guide the affairs of the kingdom, he was a powerful prince.... He was an experienced warrior full of patience and wisdom in military affairs. He was of medium height and was already well advanced in age. — William of Tyre's description of Fulk

Unlike their predecessors, Fulk and Melisende made little attempt to expand their kingdom through conquest. The Fatimids of Egypt sought to maintain peace with them, while the couple focused their efforts on blockading Fatimid-ruled Ascalon and securing the borders against Zengi. Fulk was particularly concerned with neutralizing the threat posed by Ascalon; in 1134-36, he constructed a strongly fortified castle of Bethgibelin, which was granted to the Order of the Hospital. Fulk continued the economic policy of the preceding kings. He cooperated with the Italian maritime republics, which controlled the kingdom's export trade, refusing to favor any. In 1136, he also promised to support the merchants of Marseille in their activities in the kingdom.

Fulk enjoyed a consistently cordial relationship with the Church, the affairs of which were handled principally by Melisende. In 1137, the ageing Frankish knight Geoffrey of the Tower of David returned to the kingdom after decades in Egyptian captivity and sought to recover lands he had lost during his absence, including villages and the monastery of Adasiyyeh, which had since reverted to the Syriac Orthodox Church. Fulk initially upheld Geoffrey's claim, but Ignatius III Jādida, the Syriac Orthodox archbishop of Jerusalem, appealed to Melisende. The queen persuaded Fulk to suspend his judgement until the case could be heard in her presence and publicly backed the archbishop. Fulk subsequently abandoned his original decision, convincing Geoffrey to relinquish his claim in exchange for a monetary compensation.

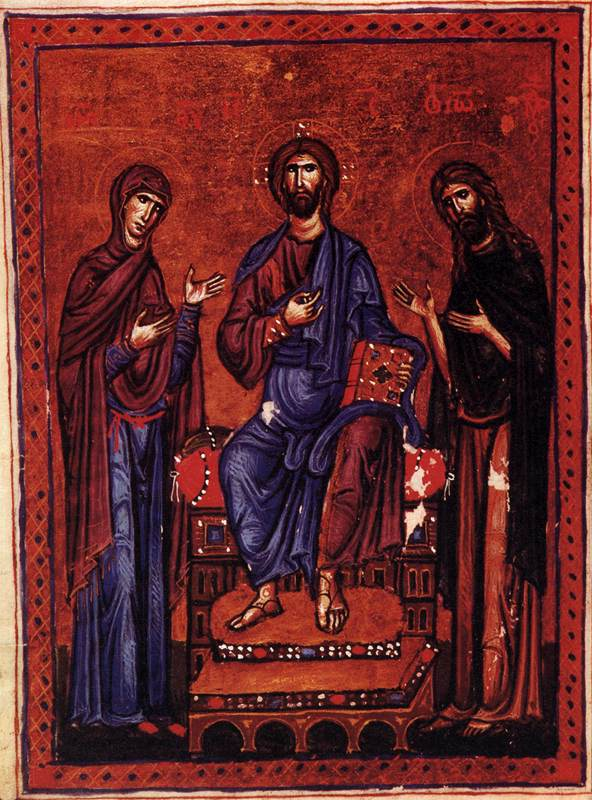
The Melisende Psalter is seen as an attempt by the king to win back his wife.

Fulk's reign in Palestine saw the introduction of sculptural motifs and styles associated with west-central France. He is particularly associated with the Melisende Psalter, a luxurious personal prayer book which he is believed to have commissioned for his wife in an effort to mend their relationship. Melisende made use of Fulk's accommodating attitude to push for the establishment of a monastery to be ruled by her youngest sister, Ioveta. After negotiating for suitable land with the patriarch and the canons of the Holy Sepulchre, the couple founded the Convent of Bethany in February 1138. There is evidence that the convent–like the Fontevraud Abbey in Maine–housed monks as well as nuns, which may suggest that Fulk too took an interest in the new foundation.

=== Continued Zengid threats ===
Count Pons of Tripoli was killed by the commander of Damascus, Bazawash, in March 1137. He was succeeded by his and Cecilia's son, Raymond II, who found himself under attack from Zengi in late June. Raymond requested help from Fulk, who mustered an army and marched north to relieve Zengi's siege of Montferrand. Zengi retired, but returned when he heard how weak Fulk's army had become on the difficult journey through the foothills leading to Montferrand. Most of Fulk's army perished in a quick battle with Zengi's forces; Raymond was captured, while Fulk escaped with his nobles into the fortress, which was heaving with people. Before Zengi besieged the fortress, Fulk sent messengers to Patriarch William of Jerusalem, Prince Raymond of Antioch, and Count Joscelin of Edessa. All three men marched towards Montferrand with armies to relieve the king, who was under heavy bombardment. The besieged were running out of food and unaware of the coming relief force. At the end of July, Fulk accepted generous terms from Zengi, ceding Montferrand in return for his freedom and that of the men captured in the battle.

We all know and our elders have long taught us that Antioch was part of the Empire of Constantinople till it was taken from the emperor by the Turks, who held it for fourteen years, and that the emperor's claims about the treaties made by our ancestors are correct. Ought we then to deny the truth and oppose what is right? — Fulk's response to Raymond

While Fulk was under siege in Montferrand, Emperor John II Komnenos was subduing Cilicia. In August 1137, he appeared before the walls of Antioch, demanding its submission under the terms of the oath taken to Emperor Alexios I Komnenos by the leaders of the First Crusade. Raymond sent letters to Fulk to confer, but Fulk affirmed the Byzantine claim and Raymond recognized the emperor as his suzerain. Besides the strength of his legal argument, John had the army the Franks needed to check the growing power of their Muslim adversaries.

In early 1138, the new ruler of Damascus, Mu'in ad-Din Unur, suggested to the Franks an alliance against Zengi, their common foe. The Damascene envoy, Usama ibn Munqidh, was received honorably at court, but the proposal was turned down. Count Thierry of Flanders–who had married Fulk's daughter Sibylla–came to Jerusalem on a pilgrimage in mid-1139. Fulk made use of Thierry's visit to seize a cave fortress in Gilead, which had been used to launch raids against the kingdom. The kingdom suffered a damaging raid during this expedition because Fulk took so many men that it was left poorly defended.

After Zengi laid siege to Damascus in March 1140, Unur sent Usama to the Franks again, offering Banias and a monthly tribute in return for their assistance in driving Zengi out. Fulk accepted, and in April 1140 led the Frankish army into Galilee. Advancing cautiously, he forced Zengi to abandon the siege. Soon afterwards, Raymond of Antioch arrived to help Fulk and Unur in the siege of Banyas, which Unur subsequently transferred to Frankish control. The town was then restored to its former lord, Renier Brus. Fulk appreciated the Damascene alliance. He soon hosted Unur and Usama at his court in Acre, and when Unur complained about Renier raiding Damascene flocks, Fulk ordered Renier to cease and pay compensation.

In the later part of his reign, Fulk eschewed involvement in the northern affairs; his ability to assist his Christian neighbors was, in any case, hampered by the defeat at Montferrand. Instead, he concentrated on his kingdom. He continued to work tirelessly to strengthen its southern defenses. He and Melisende oversaw the construction of two more fortresses, Ibelin in 1141 and Blanchegarde in 1142, which were granted to Balian the Old and the Hospitallers, respectively. In 1142, Fulk constructed Kerak Castle in Transjordan to secure the eastern portion of the kingdom.

=== Hunting accidents ===
In 1142, John returned to Cilicia. From there, he sent ambassadors to announce to Fulk an intention to make a pilgrimage to Jerusalem and offer to jointly attack Muslims. Fulk had no wish to see a vast Byzantine army descend into his kingdom, and he would have had to pay for John's assistance by recognizing imperial suzerainty. Fulk sent a delegation–Bishop Anselm of Bethlehem, Abbot Geoffrey of the Temple of the Lord, and Rohard the Elder–to inform John that the kingdom could not support an army as large as John's and that he would be glad to welcome John if he came with a smaller escort. John demurred; early next year, he died of wounds sustained in a hunting accident.

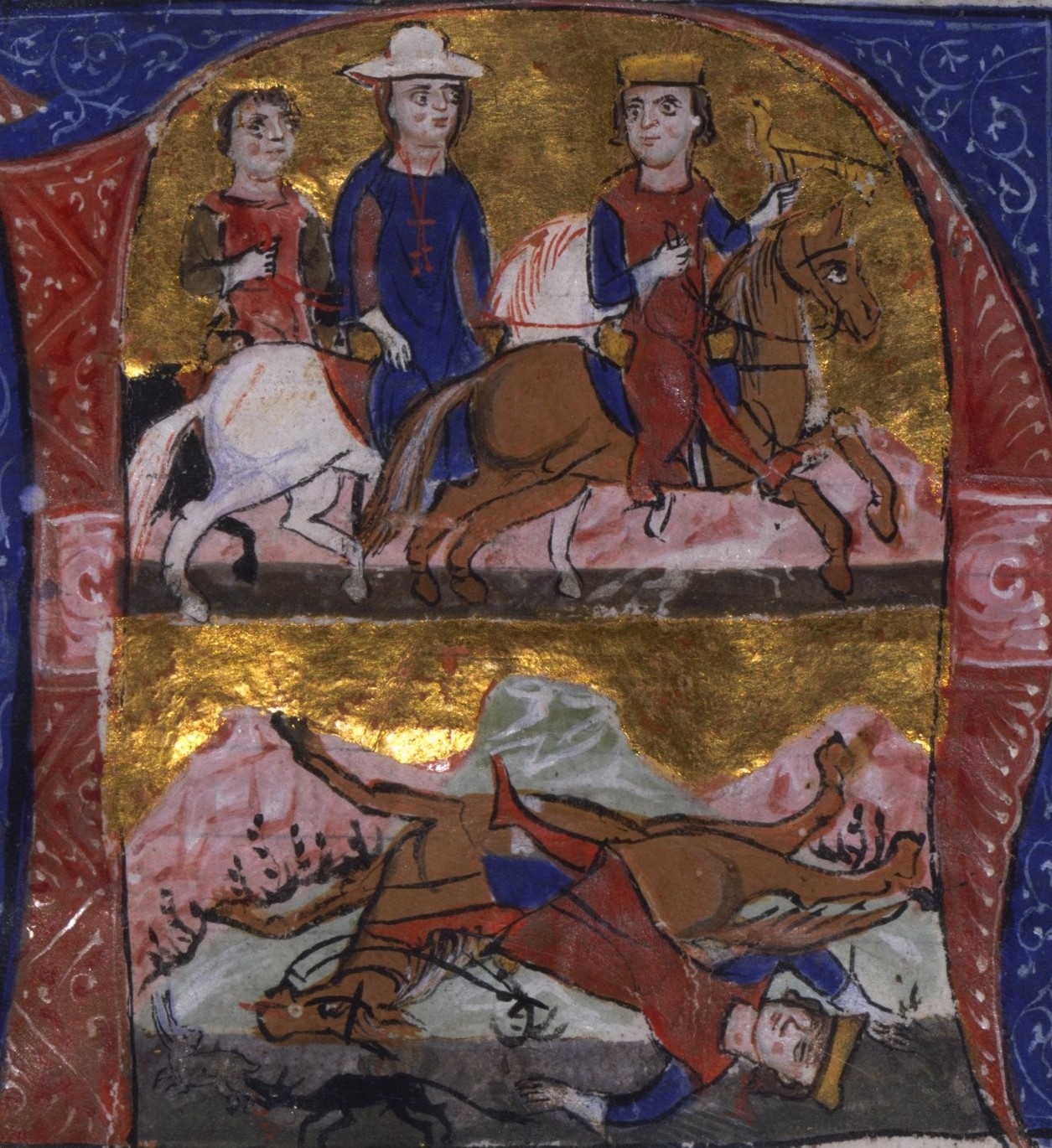
Fulk died in a hunting accident on a picnic proposed by his wife.

In late 1143, the royal court resided at Acre during a period of relative peace. On 7 November, Fulk indulged Melisende's wish to ride into the surrounding countryside for a picnic. While riding, they flushed a hare. Fulk spurred his horse in pursuit, but the horse stumbled and threw him to the ground. The saddle struck Fulk's head as he fell, leaving him unconscious. He was taken back to Acre, where he died from his injuries on 10 November. He was buried by the gate on the right side of the Holy Sepulchre in a ceremony conducted by Patriarch William. Melisende made a public demonstration of grief and promptly established herself as sole ruler of the kingdom, notwithstanding the coronation of their son Baldwin III on 25 December.

Regnal titles
Preceded by Fulk IV; Geoffrey IV	Count of Anjou; 1106–1129 with Fulk IV	Succeeded by Geoffrey the Fair
Preceded by Elias I	Count of Maine; 1110–1126 with Eremburga	Succeeded by Geoffrey the Fair
Preceded by Baldwin II	King of Jerusalem; 1131–1143 with Melisende	Succeeded by Melisende; Baldwin III
