= Geoffrey of the Tower of David =

12th-century Frankish knight and crusader

Geoffrey of the Tower of David (Latin: Gulfridus, Gunfridus or Gumfridus) was a 12th-century Frankish knight and crusader. He built up an estate around Jerusalem in the First Crusade and became an officer and possibly an in-law of King Baldwin I. From 1106 until 1137 he was kept captive in Egypt, and after his return engaged in a land dispute with Bishop Ignatius III Jādida.

== Crusading and royal service ==
Geoffrey took part in the First Crusade. As the crusade approached Jerusalem, the Fatimids expelled the city's Christian population, including the Syriac Orthodox. The crusaders conquered Jerusalem in 1099 and Geoffrey took possession of land that had belonged to the Syriac Orthodox Church.

Geoffrey was the castellan of Jerusalem (more precisely, of the Tower of David) in the early years of the Kingdom of Jerusalem. He was also in charge of the Castle of Arnolf and probably owned the villages of al-Mazra'a ash-Sharqiya and Khirbet Taraphin near Wadi al-Haramiya. He had a personal connection to King Baldwin I; the Syriac sources state that he was Baldwin's son-in-law, but this is not likely because Baldwin is not known to have had any daughters. Geoffrey's wife may have instead been related to Baldwin's Armenian wife.

== Captivity and return ==
In October 1106, a Fatimid army invaded the kingdom and attacked the Castle of Arnolf. Geoffrey's men were killed and he was captured to be held for ransom. The administration of his estate was assumed by his nephew. Geoffrey spent the next three decades as a captive in Egypt, ignored by the successive rulers–Kings Baldwin I, Baldwin II, and Fulk and Queen Melisende. Geoffrey's wife (possibly named Ida) and relatives promised to cede a village to the Armenian bishop of Jerusalem if the bishop procured Geoffrey's release. The bishop duly used his influence with the Armenian-born vizier of Egypt, Bahram, and Geoffrey was released in 1137. When he learned about this in prison, Geoffrey swore to repay the Armenians even more.

Geoffrey, by then a very old man, returned to the kingdom "as out of the grave" and was hailed by the Franks as a hero of the First Crusade. The Syriac sources, however, record that various people were dismayed to see him return because he had once seized their land. Geoffrey went to Bethgibelin and demanded from King Fulk the return of his estate, including the villages of Beth Arif and Adasiyyeh, which were then back in the possession of the Syriac Orthodox Church. The king decreed that Geoffrey should have the villages, but the Syriac Orthodox bishop of Jerusalem, Ignatius III Jādida, appealed against this decision to Queen Melisende. Melisende intervened on behalf of the Syriacs, and Fulk then admonished Geoffrey until he persuaded him to renounce his claim to the villages. Geoffrey was compensated with 200 dinars.
