= Geoffrey Martel (disambiguation) =

Geoffrey Martel primarily refers to Geoffrey II, Count of Anjou (1040–60), but may also refer to:

- Geoffrey IV, Count of Anjou (1103–06)
- Geoffrey V, Count of Anjou (1129–51)
- Geoffrey, Count of Nantes (1156–58)
