= Anselm (bishop of Bethlehem) =

Latin churchman (fl. 1129–1145)

Anselm was a Latin churchman who served as the bishop of Bethlehem in the Kingdom of Jerusalem from 1129 until 1145.

Anselm's early career is not known; the historian Bernard Hamilton presumes that, like other men who rose during the reign of King Baldwin II, Anselm had connections with northwestern France and the French court. Anselm had been appointed to the bishopric of Bethlehem by March 1129, succeeding Bishop Aschetinus. Like his predecessor, Anselm was closely connected to both the curia of the Latin patriarch of Jerusalem and to the royal court. In March 1129, for example, he was part of King Baldwin's retinue at the royal palace in Acre; the court had gathered there to welcome Count Fulk V of Anjou, who was on his way to marry Melisende, the king's daughter and designated heir.

Anselm remained in royal favor after Fulk became king. He and the patriarch of Jerusalem, William of Messines, were Fulk's most trusted men among the episcopate, both having been recently appointed rather than part of the old establishment. The two prelates led the Church of Jerusalem to recognize Innocent II as pope in the ongoing schism. In 1135, Anselm accompanied Fulk to Antioch, where Fulk organized the principality's defenses. He was back in Antioch in 1140 as part of the Jerusalemite delegation to the council that deposed the Latin patriarch of Antioch, Ralph of Domfront.

In 1142, Emperor John II Komnenos expressed a desire to visit Jerusalem. Concerned that the emperor might demand homage, King Fulk dispatched a delegation led by Bishop Anselm, along with Geoffrey, abbot of the Temple of the Lord, and Rohard the Elder, viscount of Jerusalem. Their mission was delicate: they informed the emperor that he would be welcome only if he came as a private pilgrim with only a modest escort. Though John was offended and declined to accept such terms, no harm came to the kingdom, as he died in a hunting accident while wintering in Cilicia in 1143.

Anselm was in contact with Leo, dean of Rheims between 1142 and 1146, who sent a psalter for use in Bethlehem's church choir. Anselm, in turn, established a prayer union between Bethlehem and Rheims. Anselm is last recorded on 14 August 1145, when he witnessed the resolution of a tithe dispute arbitrated by Patriarch William between the canons of the Holy Sepulchre and the monks of Mount Tabor. By early 1146, Anselm had been succeeded by Bishop Gerald.

== Bibliography ==
- Hamilton, Bernard (1980). The Latin Church in the Crusader States: The Secular Church. Variorum Publications. ISBN 978-1-351-88705-2.
- Hamilton, Bernard; Jotischky, Andrew (2020). Derek Baker (ed.). Latin and Greek Monasticism in the Crusader States. Cambridge University Press. ISBN 978-0521836388.
- Mayer, Hans Eberhard (1989). "Angevins versus Normans: The New Men of King Fulk of Jerusalem". Proceedings of the American Philosophical Society. 133 (1). American Philosophical Society: 1–25. ISSN 0003-049X. JSTOR 987158.
