= Alain Demurger =

French historian

Alain Demurger is a French historian, and a leading specialist of the history of the Knights Templar and the Crusades.

Alain Demurger is an honorary maître de conférences at the Université de Paris I Panthéon-Sorbonne. He specializes in the history of the Crusades, the history of the religious orders, and the state of France at the end of the Middle Ages.

Demurger has been praised as the author of a good general survey on the Knights Templar, in Malcolm Barber's book The New Knighthood (p. 397): "There are good general surveys, by Marie-Louise Bulst-Theile, Sacrae Domus Militiae Templi Hierosolymitani Magistri (1974), and Alain Demurger, Vie et mort de l'ordre du Temple" (Life and Death of the Order of the Temple) (1985).

== Publications ==
=== Military orders ===
- Chevaliers du Christ, les ordres religieux militaires au Moyen Âge, Le Seuil, 2002, ISBN 2-02-049888-X, 416 pages.

=== Knights Templar ===
- Vie et mort de l'ordre du Temple, 1120-1314, Edition Nathan, Paris, 1998, ISBN 2-02-020815-6, 448 pages.
- Jacques de Molay : le crépuscule des templiers, Biographie Payot, Paris, 2002, ISBN 978-2-228-89628-3, 396 pages.
- Les Templiers. Une chevalerie chrétienne au Moyen Âge, Le Seuil, 2005, ISBN 2-02-066941-2
- Les Templiers, Editions Jean-Paul Gisserot, 2007, ISBN 2-87747-955-2

=== Crusades ===
- La croisade au Moyen Âge. Idée et pratiques, Paris, F. Nathan, (Coll. 128), 1998.
- Brève histoire des Ordres religieux-militaires [Guide aide-mémoire], Gavaudun, Ed. Fragile. 1997.
- Croisades et croisés au Moyen Âge, Champs Flammarion, Paris 2006, ISBN 978-2-08-080137-1

=== Middle ages ===
- Nouvelles histoires de la France médiévale. Tome 5 : Temps de crises. Temps d'espoirs. Points Seuil, Paris, 1990.
- L'Occident médiéval : XIII-XV siècle, Hachette Education, collection « Les fondamentaux - histoire géographie », 2004.

== Articles ==
- « La Famille Jouvenel. Quelques questions sur un tableau », Annuaire-Bulletin de la Société de l’Histoire de France, 1997, p. 39-56.
- « Trésor des Templiers, trésor du roi. Mise au point sur les opérations financières des templiers », dans Pouvoir et Gestion, Toulouse, Presses de l'Université des Sciences sociales, 1997, p. 73-86.
- « Le religieux de Saint-Denis et la croisade », dans Saint-Denis et la royauté. Mélanges offerts à Bernard Guenée, Actes du Colloque international en l'honneur de B. Guenée. Paris, Publications de la Sorbonne, 1999, pp. 181–196.
- « Les templiers à Auxerre », dans P. Boucheron et Jacques Chiffoleau, Religion et société urbaine au Moyen Age. Etudes offertes à Jean-Louis Biget, Paris, Publications de la Sorbonne, 2000, p. 301-312.
- « Pour trois mille livres de dette : Geoffroy de Sergines et le Temple », dans La présence latine en Orient au Moyen Âge, Paris, Centre historique des Archives Nationales, 2000, p. 67-76.
- Les Templiers : Guerriers du Pape

=== Video ===
- Les Templiers partent en croisade, émission "C'est pas sorcier", France Télévision
