= Ignatius III =

Patriarch Ignatius III may refer to:

- Ignatius III Jādida, Syriac Orthodox bishop of Jerusalem in 1125–1138
- Ignatius III David, Syriac Orthodox patriarch of Antioch in 1222–1252
- Ignatius III Atiyah, Melkite patriarch of Antioch in 1619–1634
