= Monastery of Saint Mark =

Christian monastery in East Jerusalem

Coordinates: 31.7763°N 35.2305°E

Monastery of Saint Mark the Evangelist and the Virgin Mary
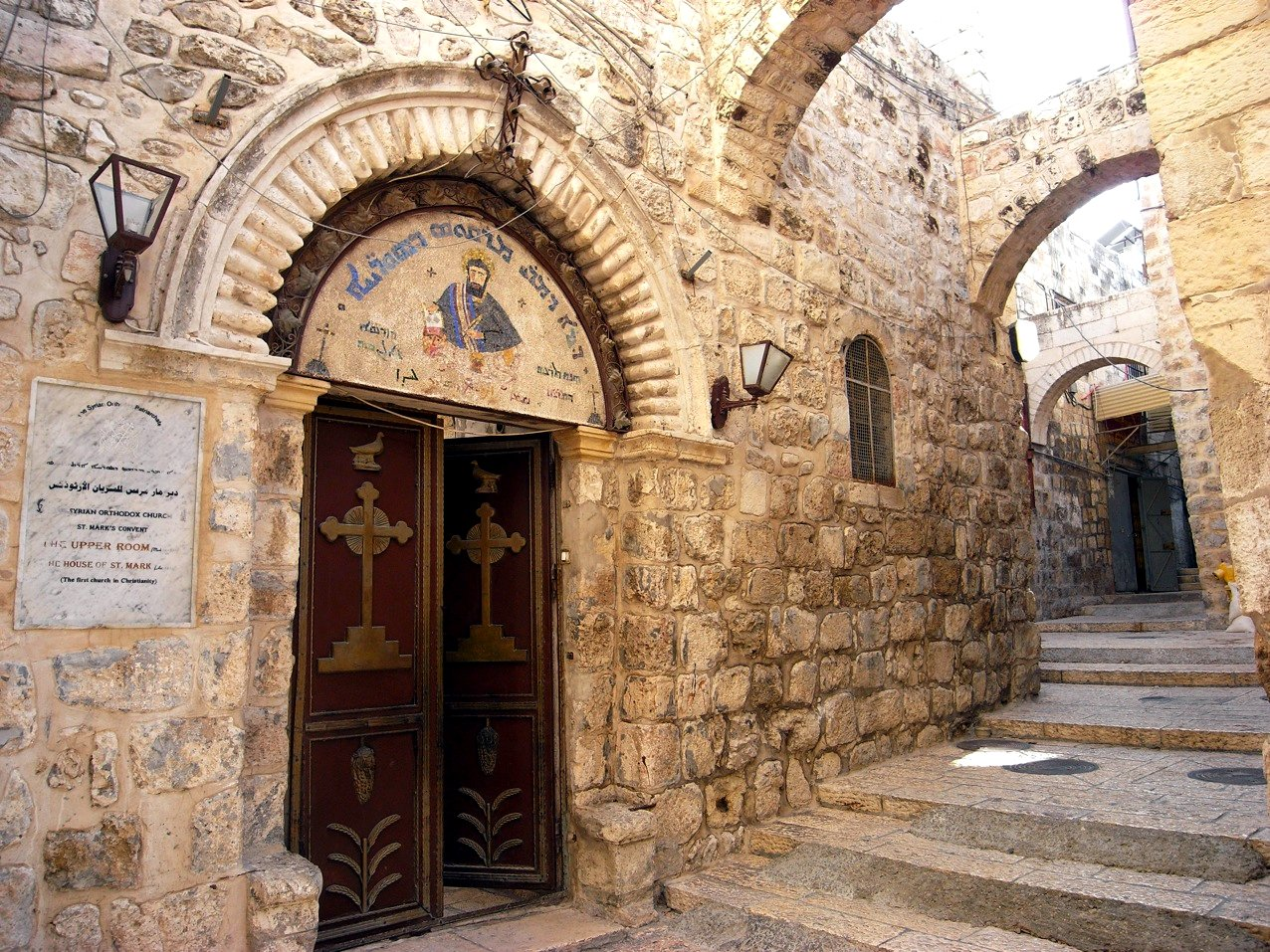

- Location within Old City of Jerusalem

Monastery information
- Established: 5th or 6th century
- Dedication: Mark the Evangelist and the Virgin Mary
- Diocese: Archdiocese of Jerusalem

Site
- Location: Old City (Jerusalem)
- Public access: Yes

The Monastery of Saint Mark the Evangelist and the Virgin Mary is a Syriac Orthodox monastery in the Armenian Quarter of the Old City of Jerusalem and residence of the Syriac Orthodox Archbishop of Jerusalem. (Note: (Arabic: دير مار مرقس الانجيلي و السيدة العذرآء, Syriac: ܕܝܪܐ ܕܡܪܝ ܡܪܩܘܣ ܐܘܢܓܠܝܣܛܐ ܘܕܡܪܬܝ ܡܪܝܡ). Also known as the Monastery of the Syrians.) It is believed to be located on the site of house of Mary, mother of Mark the Evangelist, and claims to be the first church in Christianity. The monastery consists of the main church of Saint Mark and an adjacent chapel of Saint Behnam.

== History ==
According to an Estrangelo Syriac inscription discovered in 1940, the monastery is located on the site of the house of Mary, mother of Mark the Evangelist, where the Last Supper was shared by Jesus and the Twelve Apostles, where the Apostles hid after the Passion and Crucifixion of Jesus, and where Jesus appeared to the Apostles after the Resurrection. Saint Peter also went to the house after his liberation from prison. The inscription details that the house was converted into a church in the name of the Mother of God by the Apostles after the Ascension of Jesus and rebuilt in 73 AD following the destruction of Jerusalem by Titus. The inscription and the foundation of the monastery is dated by Aphrem Barsoum to the fifth or sixth century. (Note: Other scholars have argued that the inscription dates to the late fifteenth century after the monastery was acquired by the Syriac Orthodox Church or was instead produced in 1940.) The "House of Mark" is mentioned in the works of John of Dara in the ninth century.

The current structure was constructed during the Crusader period and was later purchased by the Syriac Orthodox patriarch from the Coptic Orthodox Church in 1471/1472 at a time of an increase in pilgrimage to Jerusalem from the Syriac Orthodox heartland of Tur Abdin. It has been suggested that the monastery was identified with the "House of Mary, the mother of the disciple John Marcus" during this period. The monastery became the seat of the Syriac Orthodox Archbishop of Jerusalem around the late 1400s. A number of houses were bought for the monastery by Yuhanna Jirjis of Basibrina, bishop of the Monastery of Qartmin (r. 1450–1495), and the monk-priest Daniel donated a house to the monastery in the Sihyawn district in 1511. The monastery's library was likely established in the sixteenth or seventeenth century.

Gregorios Shimʿun of Ṣalaḥ, metropolitan bishop of Jerusalem, and Dionysius Shukrallah, metropolitan bishop of Aleppo, undertook the earliest known renovation of the monastery at the end of 1717 and the beginning of 1718. ‘Abd al-Ahad Fanna was abbot of the Monastery of Saint Mark in 1718–1726. In 1722, the monastery was renovated by Basilius Girgis, metropolitan bishop of Bushairiyya, with the assistance of Patriarch Ignatius Shukrallah II, Gregorius ‘Abd al-Ahad, metropolitan bishop of Jerusalem, and Jirjis, metropolitan bishop of Edessa. The monk Yuhanna of Aleppo was appointed as the monastery's abbot in 1726 by Gregorius ‘Abd al-Ahad, metropolitan bishop of Jerusalem, and served until his death in 1728.

On the death of Yuhanna of Aleppo in 1728, Cyril Jirjis, metropolitan bishop of Monastery of St. Elian, was entrusted with the administration of the monastery and the diocese of Jerusalem by Patriarch Ignatius Shukrallah II and immediately set about renovating the monastery's church and vessels. Cyril Jirjis also purchased an iron gate for the monastery from his own funds after the old wooden door had been smashed in an incident in July 1729. The monk ‘Abd al-Ahad was chosen to administer the monastery and diocese by Cyril Jirjis after having fulfilled the role for over nine years. The monastery was further renovated by Gregorios Jirjis Fattal of Aleppo from 1738 to 1744, during which time Cyril Jirjis also enlarged the reception hall in 1741.

Cyril Jirjis, following his appointment as metropolitan bishop of Jerusalem in 1748, immediately travelled to Egypt to collect alms for the monastery's reconstruction for which he subsequently spent 1000 zur mahbub or approximately four or five hundred golden liras. Elias, son of Faraj Allah of Aleppo, was abbot in 1754–1763. The monastery was again renovated by Gregorios Bshara, metropolitan bishop of Jerusalem, in 1780–1792, by Gregorios ʿAbd al-Aḥad Dajjala in 1833–1840, by Ostethewos ʿAbd al-Nūr of Edessa in 1840–1877, and by Gregorios Jirjis of Ṣadad in 1882. Several buildings were constructed at the monastery by Iyawannis Elias, metropolitan bishop of Jerusalem, (r. 1896–1908).

In the aftermath of the Sayfo in the First World War, a number of manuscripts were transferred to the Monastery of Saint Mark from the Mor Hananyo Monastery in Tur Abdin. Similarly, some manuscripts were moved from the Monastery of Saint Mark to the patriarchate at Homs prior to the 1948 Arab–Israeli War and then later also to Damascus whilst some manuscripts were brought with Athanasius Yeshue Samuel to the USA in 1948 and are now kept at St. Mark’s Cathedral, Teaneck, New Jersey. The underground church was renovated in 1989 and the patriarchal reception room was renovated in 2008.

== Gallery ==
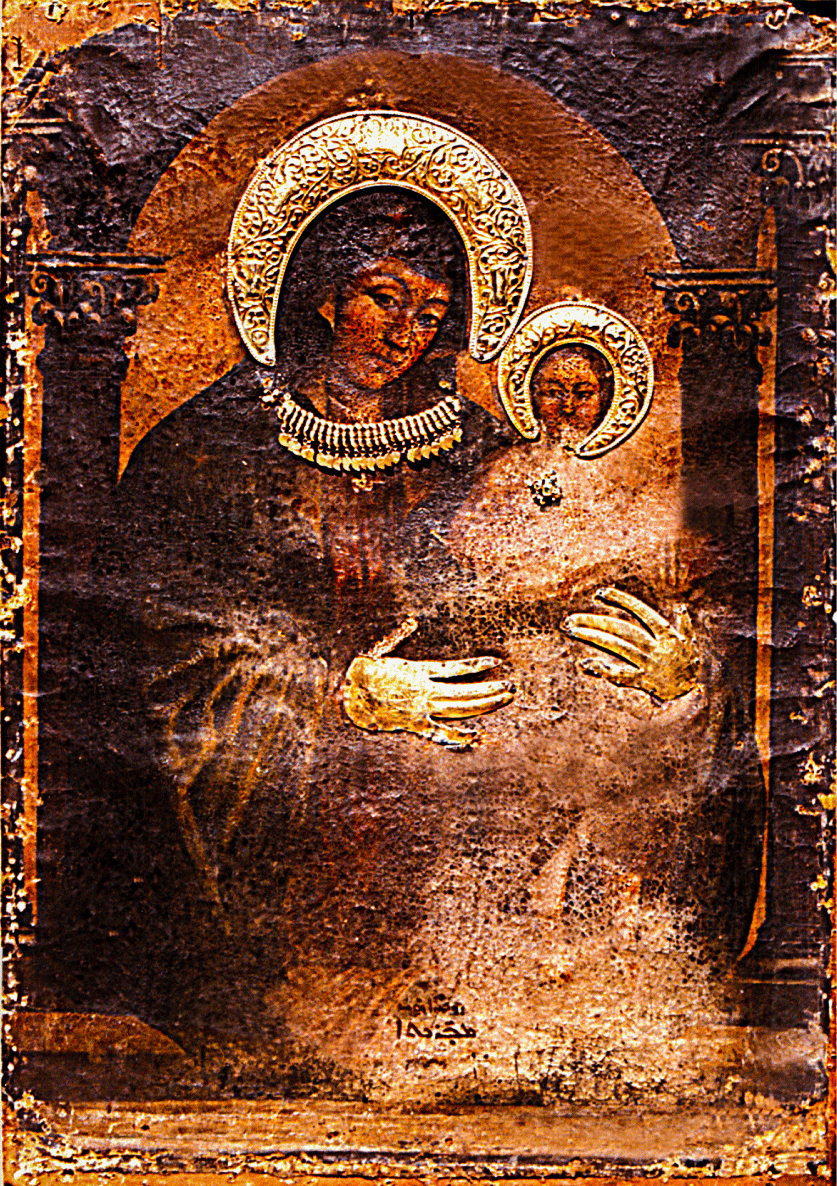
Icon of Virgin Mary, traditionally attributed to Luke the Evangelist.

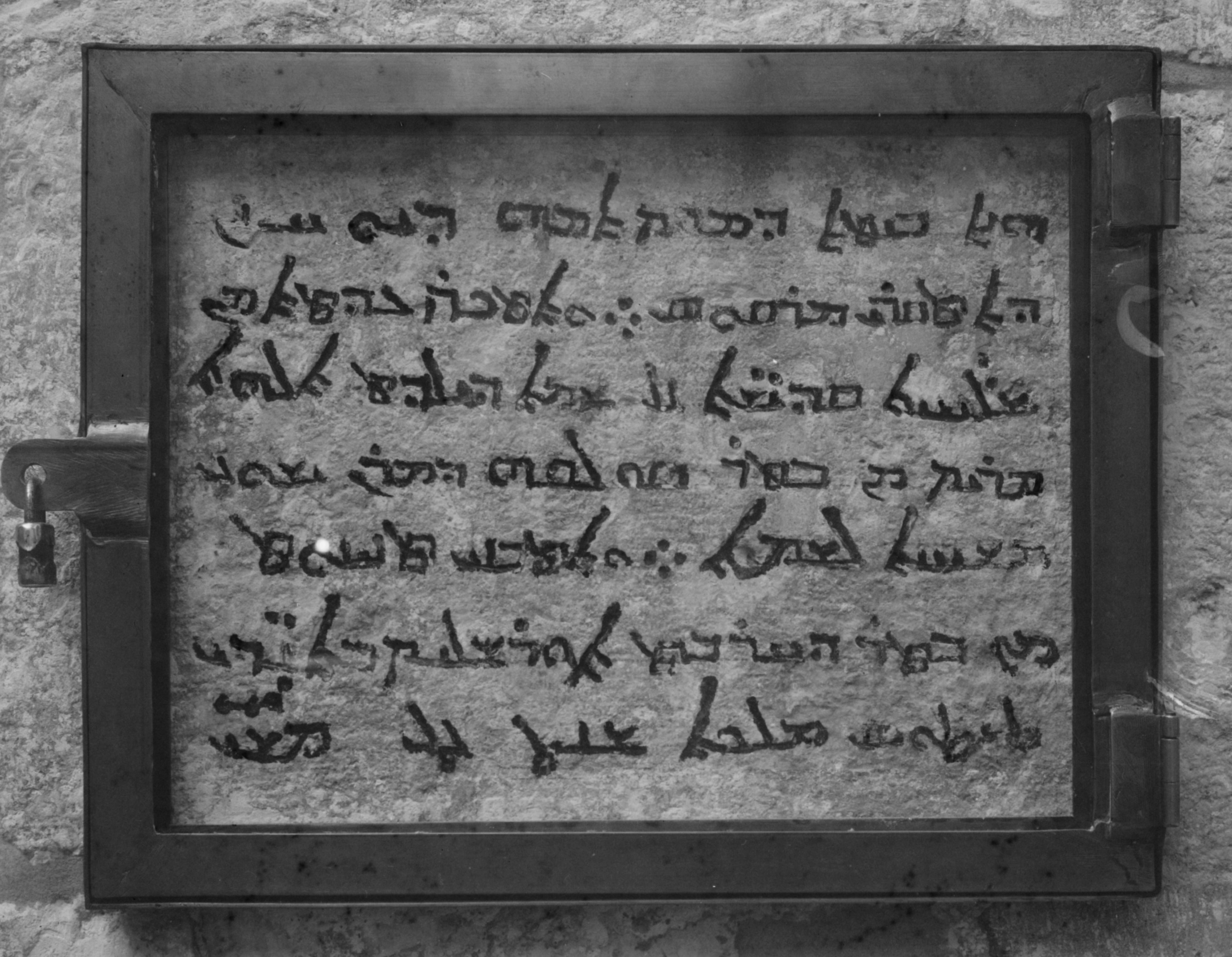
Inscription at the Church

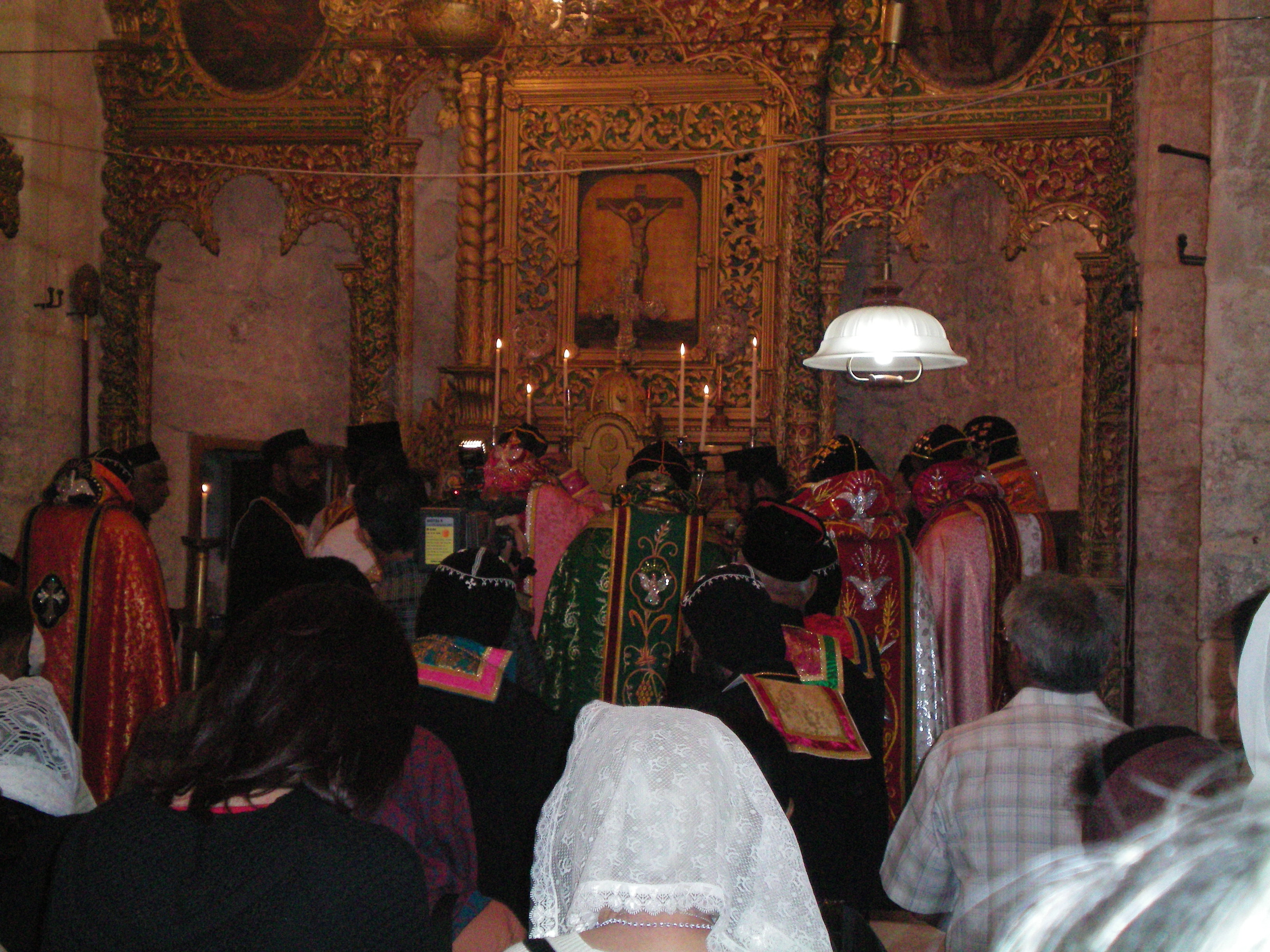
Holy Qurbana being celebrated by the congregation of Jacobite Syrian Christian Church.

== Bibliography ==
- Media related to St. Mark's Monastery (Jerusalem) at Wikimedia Commons
- Barsoum, Aphrem (2003). The Scattered Pearls: A History of Syriac Literature and Sciences. Translated by Matti Moosa (2nd ed.). Gorgias Press.
- Barsoum, Aphrem (2008a). History of the Za'faran Monastery. Translated by Matti Moosa. Gorgias Press.
- Barsoum, Aphrem (2008b). The History of Tur Abdin. Translated by Matti Moosa. Gorgias Press.
- Barsoum, Aphrem (2009a). History of the Syriac Dioceses. Vol. 1. Translated by Matti Moosa. Gorgias Press.
- Barsoum, Aphrem (2009b). The Collected Historical Essays of Aphram I Barsoum. Vol. 1. Translated by Matti Moosa. Gorgias Press.
- Joseph, John (1984). Muslim-Christian Relations and Inter-Christian Rivalries in the Middle East: The Case of the Jacobites in an Age of Transition. State University of New York Press.
- Kiraz, George A. (2011). "Mark, Monastery of St.". In Sebastian P. Brock; Aaron M. Butts; George A. Kiraz; Lucas Van Rompay (eds.). Gorgias Encyclopedic Dictionary of the Syriac Heritage: Electronic Edition. Gorgias Press.
- Murre-van den Berg, Heleen (2013). "A Center of Transnational Syriac Orthodoxy: St. Mark's Convent in Jerusalem". Journal of Levantine Studies. 3 (1): 59–81.
- Palmer, Andrew (1991). "The History of the Syrian Orthodox in Jerusalem". Oriens Christianus. 75: 16–43.
