= Château de Guilleragues =

Castle in Saint-Sulpice-de-Guilleragues, France

Coordinates: 44°37′33″N 0°3′0″E

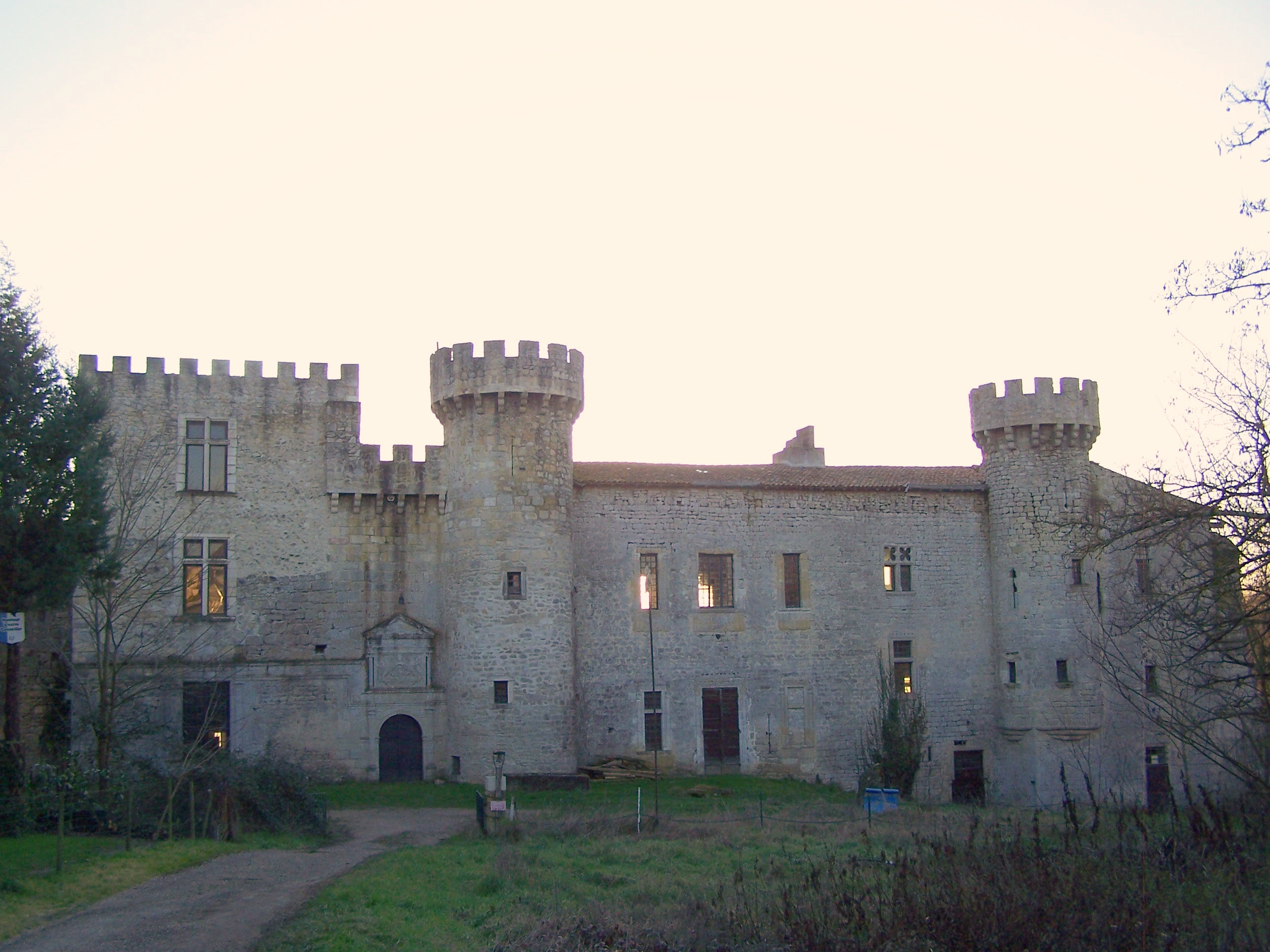
The restored château, in 2010

The Château de Guilleragues is a medieval, previously ruined but restored castle in the commune of Saint-Sulpice-de-Guilleragues in the Gironde département of France.

This early 14th-century castle, built at the side of a small valley, consists of a long rectangular building, composed of a fortified house flanked by two towers and two watchtowers at either extremity of an annexe of the same height, from 1564. The lower court and the common buildings in the north east also date from the 16th century.

Château de Guilleragues (pronunciation: [geeyerahg]) was built in many stages and went through many changes in its history. The oldest parts and foundations date back to the 12th century. Little is known about the earliest dates and status of the structure. More obvious are parts built in the 14th and 16th century.

The building must have been two or three separate structures initially, which were joined at some later point. The best known occupants of the castle are the De Lavergne family, who owned the castle in the 16th and 17th centuries. In fact, a major change took place in the 1560s, where windows were enlarged and added, doors where enlarged and many decorative features were added, changing the castle from a fortified structure with defense as its main function to a livable, more luxurious stately home.

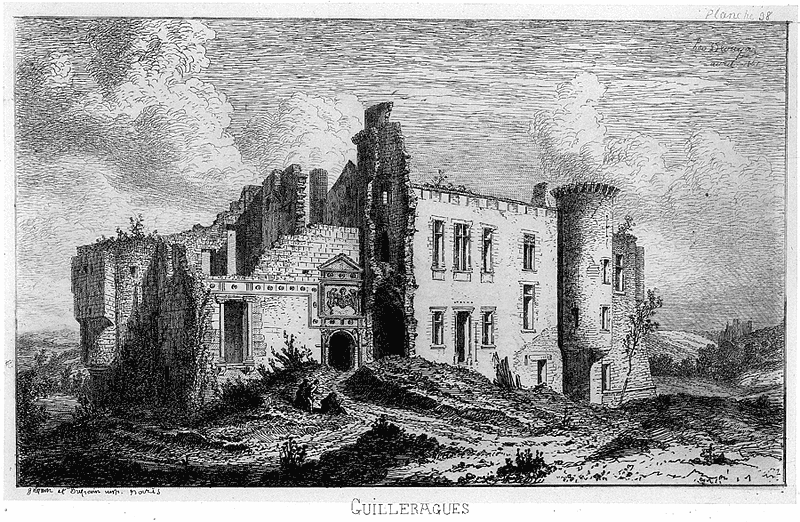
The then-ruined château, in 1861

In a large, intricate relief above the main entrance with columns, symbols and lions, the year '1564' is inscribed on the family coat of arms. This portal is listed separately in the historical monument (IMH) register. Displayed below is the coat of arms in detail, found elsewhere within the castle. It is the combination of Lavergne and Lestonnac arms.

The residence belonged in the 17th century to Gabriel-Joseph de Lavergne, Vicomte de Guilleragues, a brilliant diplomat and author of the Les Lettres portugaises (En. Letters of a Portuguese Nun). Privately owned, it has been listed since 1954 as a monument historique by the French Ministry of Culture. In the early 21st century the castle belonged to Jaye Muller, Count of Vexin.

== See also ==
- List of castles in France
