= Seals of the grand master of the Knights Templar =

Nicholson, Helen (2004). The Knights Templar: A New History (Sutton Pub Ltd ed.). pp. 177, 180. ISBN 978-0750938396.

The seals of the Knights Templar were used to authenticate characters and other documents issued by the Order of the Temple and its officers from the mid-12th century until the order's suppression in 1312. The best known is the double sided seal of the grand master, which showed the Dome of the Rock on one face and two knights riding a single horse on the other. The design is first attested under Bertrand de Blanquefort in 1158 and remained in use until the order was dissolved. Provincial masters, prosecutors and commanders used their own seals. Their imagery included the Agnus Dei, a mounted knight, a cross, castle and animals, varied by region, notably in England, France, and the Crown of Aragon.

== Templars Seal Themes ==
=== Dome of the Rock and Al Aqsa Mosque ===
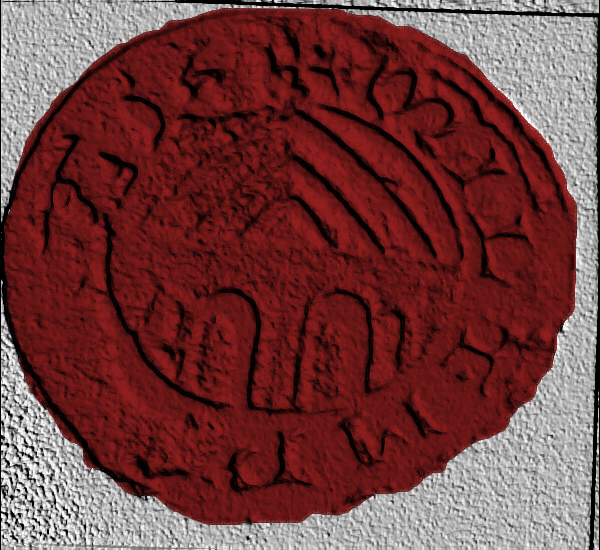
MILITIE TEMPLI SALMO Artistic representation

The reverse of Bertrand de Blancafort's seal, Master of the Temple 1168 in Staatsarchiv Amberg.

The reverse of Grand Master William of Chartres seal from 1214 also depicts the Dome of the Rock.

=== Agnus Dei ===
The seals of the masters of the Temple in England showed the Agnus Dei, or Lamb of God including those of of Aimery de St Maur, 1200, Robert of Sandford, 1241, Richard of Hastings, 1160–85, and William de la More, 1304, showed the Agnus Dei. An original charter of Robert de Turville bears a round seal with the lamb and the legend SIGILLVM TEMPLI.

The same device appears on seals of the order's provincial masters in Provence and Aragon. In heraldic description the Lamb of God has a gold nimbus with a red cross and carries a staff with a white flag bearing a red cross. A counter-seal with a bearded head and the legend TESTIS SVM AGNI (“I am a witness of the Lamb”) is also recorded.

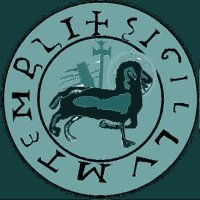
Seal of Robert of Sandford, the Master of the Temple in 1241 in the British Library.

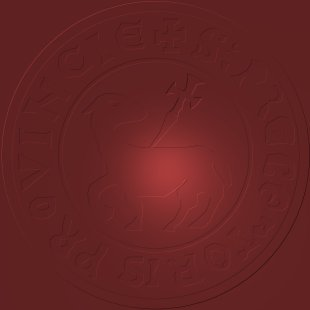
L'Agnus Dei, seal used by Roncelin de Foz. Second part of the 13th century. Departmental Archives of Marseilles -Bouches du Rhône.

Other seals: Durham Cathedral Muniments, Medieval Seal G&B reference number: 3388 Knights of the Temple 1304 Description: Round. The Holy Lamb with banner.

=== The Two Riders ===
==== The symbol ====
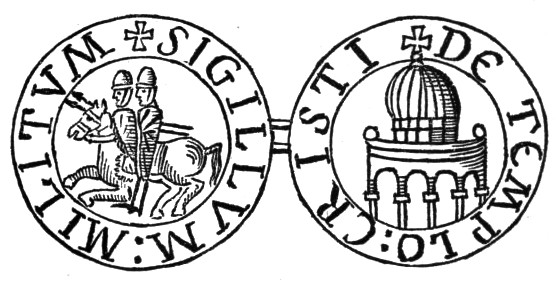
A Knights Templar seal

The Templar Seal showing two knights (perhaps Hugues de Payens and Godfrey de Saint-Omer) on one horse. There are many interpretations of the symbolism of this seal.

- Contemporary legend held that the symbol represented the initial poverty of the order; that they could afford only a single horse for every two men. Still, the Rule of the Order from the outset permitted three horses and no more for each knight, as well as no Templars sharing the same horse.
- Several masters adopted this seal from the beginning of the order until at least 1298. It is known to have been in use since 1167. According to Barber two knights one horse appeared in the 12th-13th century which he reads as suggesting frugality and humility.
- According to legend, Hugues de Payens (the first Grand-Master of the Templars) and Godfrey were so poor that between the two of them they had only one horse, and this gave rise to the famous image on the seal of the Templars, of two men riding a single horse.

The image of two knights on the horse was widely used:

- Matthew Paris in Chronica Majora ca 1250
- An English monk and chronicler from St. Albans in Historia Anglorum
- At least as early as 1158 as the seal of the Grand Master of the Temple, Bertrand de Blanchefort. This is the earliest known seal for the Grand Master of the Temple forty years after the Order was formed.
- Use of this symbol continued under subsequent Grand Masters for as long as the Order survived, however the seal went through more than one incarnation. The Reynaut de Vichiers, who was Master of the Temple from 1255-1259 depict same images, but it is obviously not the same seal.

==== The Legend ====
The seals of the Grand Masters have textual differences:

- Blanchefort's seal: SIGILLUM MILITUM (Latin, Seal of the Soldiers) obverse; CHRISTI DE TEMPLO (Latin, of Christ of the Temple) reverse.
- Vichiers' seal: SIGILLUM MILITUM XPISTI (Latin, Seal of the Soldiers of Christ).

While Vichiers' motto is written in Latin, the word 'Christ' begins with Greek letters (Chi Rho) (Latin symbol, XP) rather than the Latin CHR. The XP symbol arose early in Christianity and entered popular usage after the legendary pre-battle vision of Chi Rho and Christian conversion of the 4th century Roman Emperor Constantine. From the time of Constantine, XP was a significant symbol of Christianity, surpassed only by the cross itself. Early military associations make Chi Rho an apt symbol for the Templars. On de Vichiers' seal, Chi Rho is visible on the shields of the knights.

=== The Eagle ===
The Double-Headed Eagle is more commonly associated with Coat of Arms of the Byzantine Empire. Provincial masters and other dignitaries used seal with varied imagery, although each province tended to adopt a recognisable motif, such as the Paris Temple for France or the Agnus Dei in Provence, England and Aragon. An eagle appears on a seal of Jean de Tour the Elder, treasurer of the Paris Temple known an impression of 1295. It reproduces an engraved gem showing an eagle holding a crown between two towers. A seal of Bertram von Esbeck, master of the Temple in Germany, from 1296 shows an eagle with two six-pointed stars.

=== Cross ===
Aragon; Tortosa; Late 13th century. Depicting a cross. Legend: SIGILLUM MILICIE TEMPLI IN DERTOSA Aragon; Alfambra; 1248. Brown wax, round, 30 mm. in diameter, depicting a cross. Legend:......LUM CASTRI....

==== Cross pattée ====
A cross having arms narrow at the inner center, and very broad at the other end.

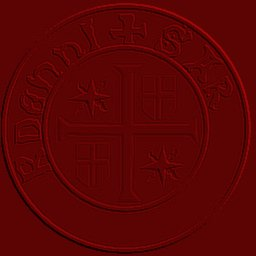
Fra Arnaude de Banyuls seal; Aragon; Gardeny; Yellow wax, round, 27 mm. in diameter, depicting a cross, with stars in two angles and shields with crosses in the other two. Legend: S. AR..........GARDENNI.

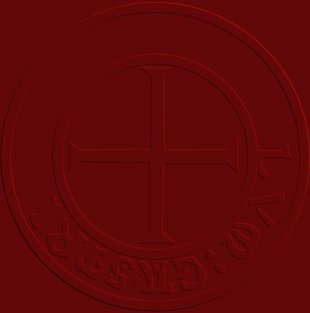
Fra Bernard de Montlor 1248 seal.

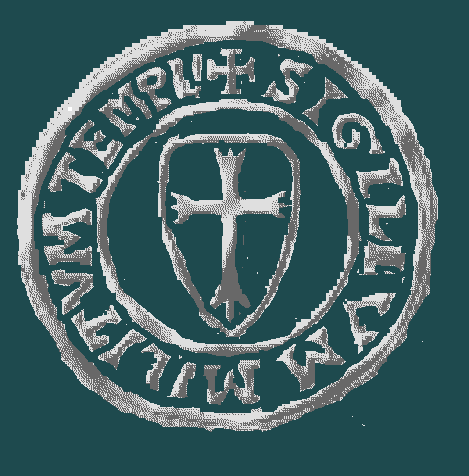
The Masters of Poitou used this seal. It has been used from the middle of the 12th century to the end of the Order.

==== Cross pattée and fleur-de-lis ====
A seal from Provence: the Templars from Roaix, Sérignan ... This knight, Giraud de Chamaret, hoists the templar cross and the "fleur-de-lis". 1234.

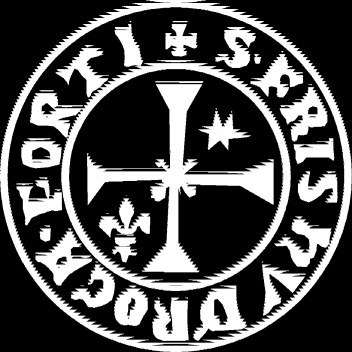
Brother Hugues de Rochefort (Hughs from "ROCAFORTI") 1204 seal. With a star and a "fleur-de-lis", this cross, hart bounded, was the Preceptor's Temple seal.

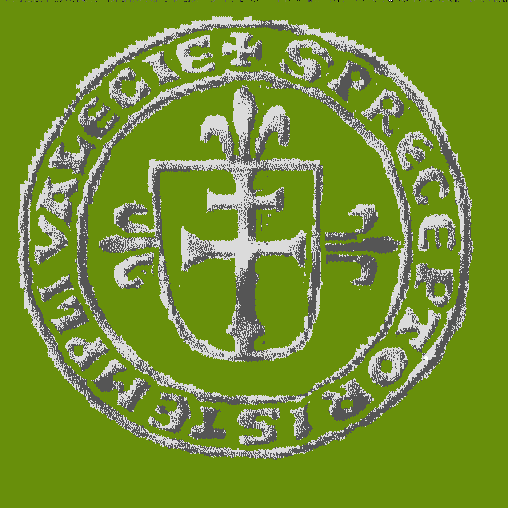
The seal of the preceptor of Poitou Legend = S PRECEPTORIS TEMPLI VALECE. Year: 1287. Appears on a charter from Saint Victor lès Valence. Seal can be found at the Archives of the City of Marseille and a moulding at the National Archives of Paris.

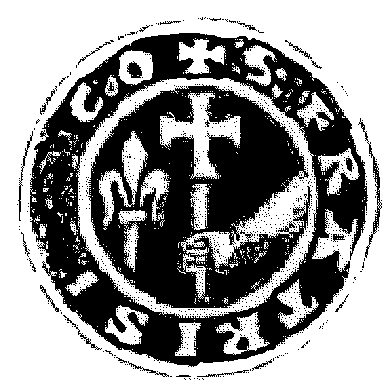
Brother Giraud de Chamaret 1234.

=== Knight on the Horse ===
The seal of Brother Roustan de Comps, commander of the Order of the Temple at Richerenches, 1232, shows a single knight on horseback, bearing a shield with a cross: probably St. George.

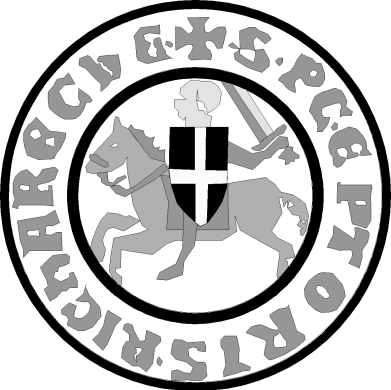
Brother Roustan de Comps 1232 seal.

=== Head ===
Seals of Brother Widekind, Master of the Temple in Germany, 1271, and Brother Frederick Wildergrave, 1289, showed Christ's head (or John the Baptist's head by other opinions)

=== Tower or Castle ===
The seal of Templar officials in Yorkshire c.1300 shows a tower with a pointed roof.

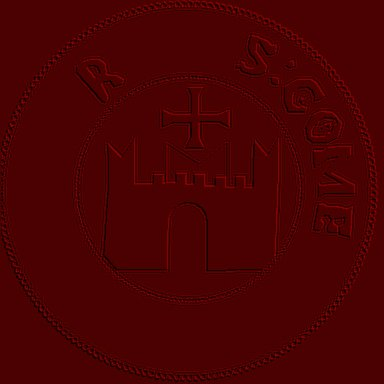
Brother Arnau Despug 1308 seal.

Aragon; Monzón; Early 14th century. Round, depicting a castle with three towers, with a griffin on each side. Legend: S. CASTELL........ONI. Aragon; Huesca; Round, depicting a castle. Legend: S. DOM. TEMPLI DE OSCA Aragon; Barbará; Early 14th century. Yellow wax, round, 29 mm. in diameter, depicting a castle between two fishes. Legend: S. COMMAND.....BARBERA

=== Chateau de Guilleragues ===
Here is a Templar cross found in the oldest tower of Château de Guilleragues in the Aquitaine region of France.

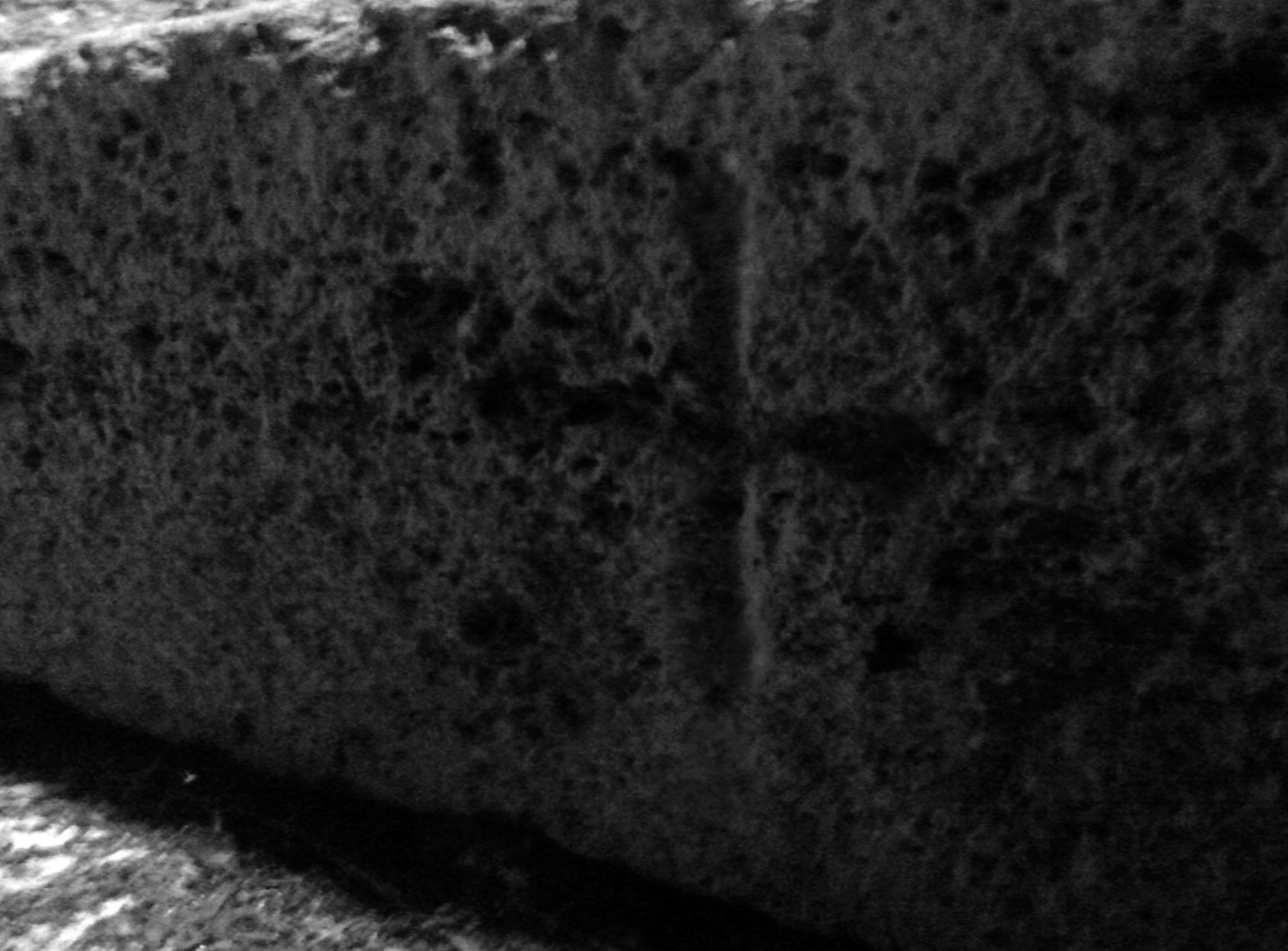
Templar Cross in oldest tower of Guilleragues Castle.

=== Abraxas ===
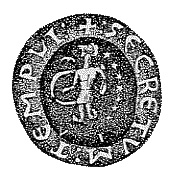
Seal of a Templar Grand Master in a French charter dated 1214, depicting Abraxas.

The word Abraxas (or Abrasax or Abracax) was engraved on certain antique stones, called Abraxas stones, which were used as amulets or charms by Gnostic sects. The image most associated with Abraxas is that of a composite creature with the head of a rooster, the body of a man, and legs made of serpents or scorpions; carrying a whip and shield. The Gnostics identified Abraxas with Yahweh (under the Greek form "IAO"). Amulets and seals bearing the figure of Abraxas were popular in the 2nd century, and these stones survived in the treasuries of the middle ages.

Abraxas appears on the seal of a Templar Grand Master in a French charter dated 1214. The Templars' use of Abraxas as a seal was most likely a result of their expansive treasuries containing a number of ancient gemstones.

=== The Dove ===
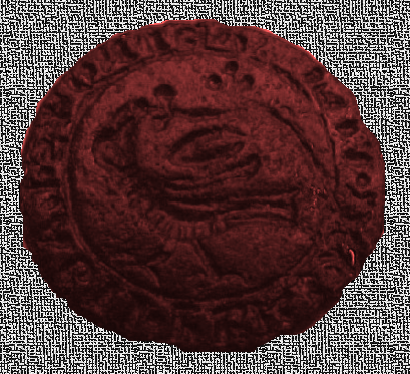
Used on the Seal of Etienne de Til-Chatel, lord of Pichanges, Preceptor of La Fontenotte. Representation of a dove, facing backwards and grasping an olive branch within its beak.

=== Star and Crescent Moon ===
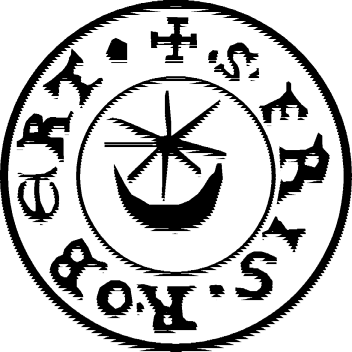
Frater Robert from the land of Retz. Seal from English 13th century. This seal was discovered in the 19th century, in the city of St Père en Retz, at Biais, Loire Atlantique, on the site of a templar Commandery.

=== Lion ===
Seals of Brother Otto of Brunswich, commander of Supplingenburg, shows a lion; A seal of one Knight Templar, England, 1303 is showing the Lion of England and the cross pattée and the crescent moon of the Mother Goddess with stars. Aragon; Miravet; 1278, 1287. Depicting a lion.

=== Griffon ===
William, Master of the Temple in Hungary and Slovenia, 1297, depicts a winged griffon.

=== Unusual uncertified early Templar insignia ===
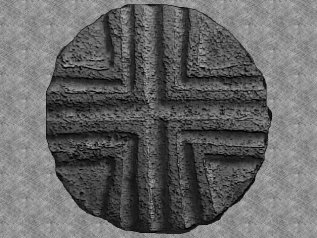
From Hugues de Payens period. Hand carved Grand Seal. Alike wax imprints were found on official documents addressed to Hugues de Payens.
