= Mary, mother of John Mark =

Biblical character

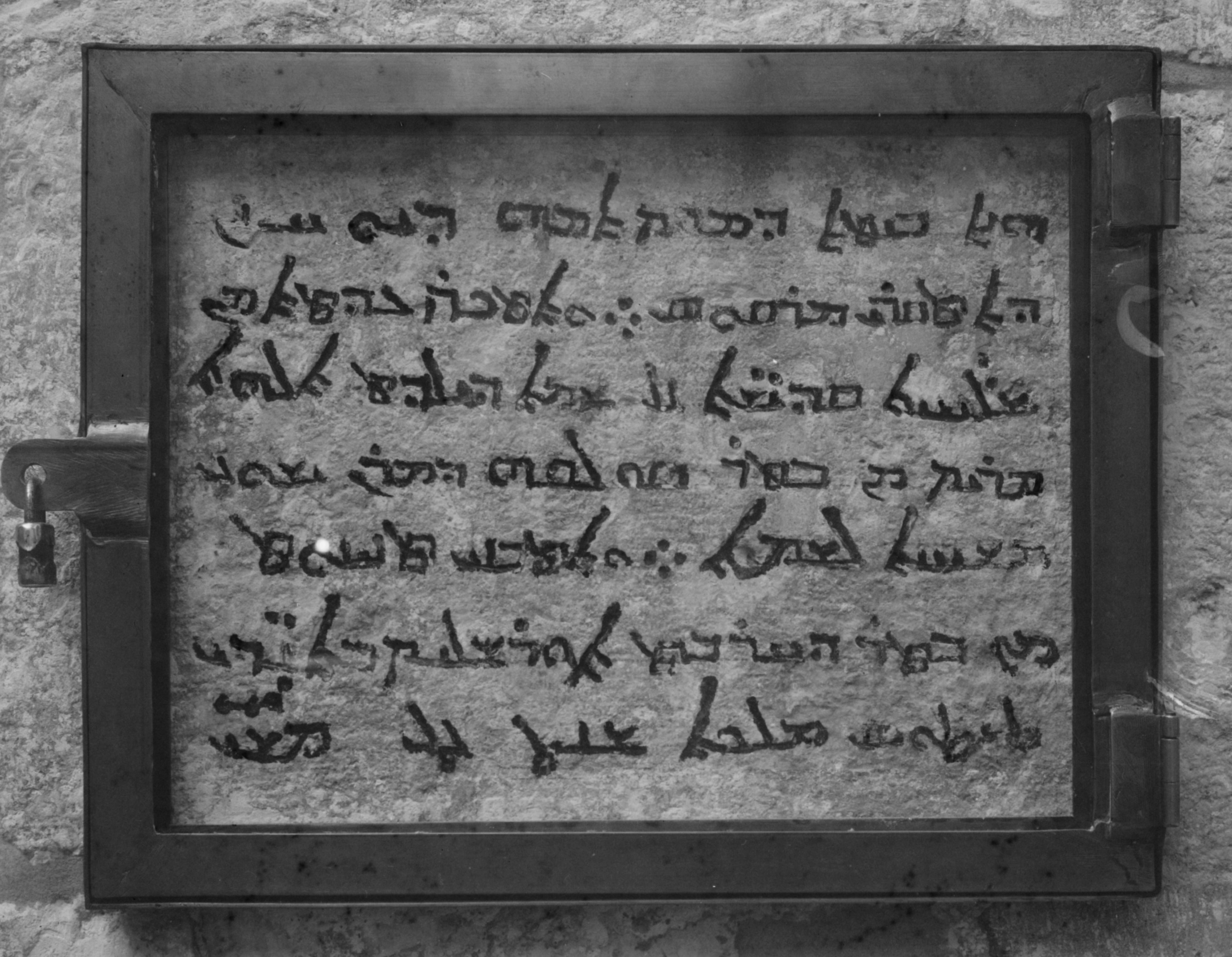
6th-century Syriac inscription at the Monastery of Saint Mark in the Old City of Jerusalem, stating: "This is the house of Mary, mother of John Mark."

Mary, mother of John Mark – commonly associated with Mark the Evangelist – is mentioned in the New Testament of the Christian Bible, in Acts 12:12, where it is said that, after his escape from prison, Peter went to her house: "When he realized this, he went to the house of Mary, the mother of John whose other name was Mark, where many were gathered together and were praying." This seems to be the only mention of her in the Bible. From this it would appear that Mary's house was a place of gathering for the Apostles and other Christians.

The Monastery of Saint Mark, in the Old City of Jerusalem, contains a 6th-century inscription claiming the place is the site of "the house of Mary, mother of John Mark".

== See also ==
- Easton's Bible Dictionary, 1897
