= Saint-Sulpice-de-Guilleragues =

- Commune
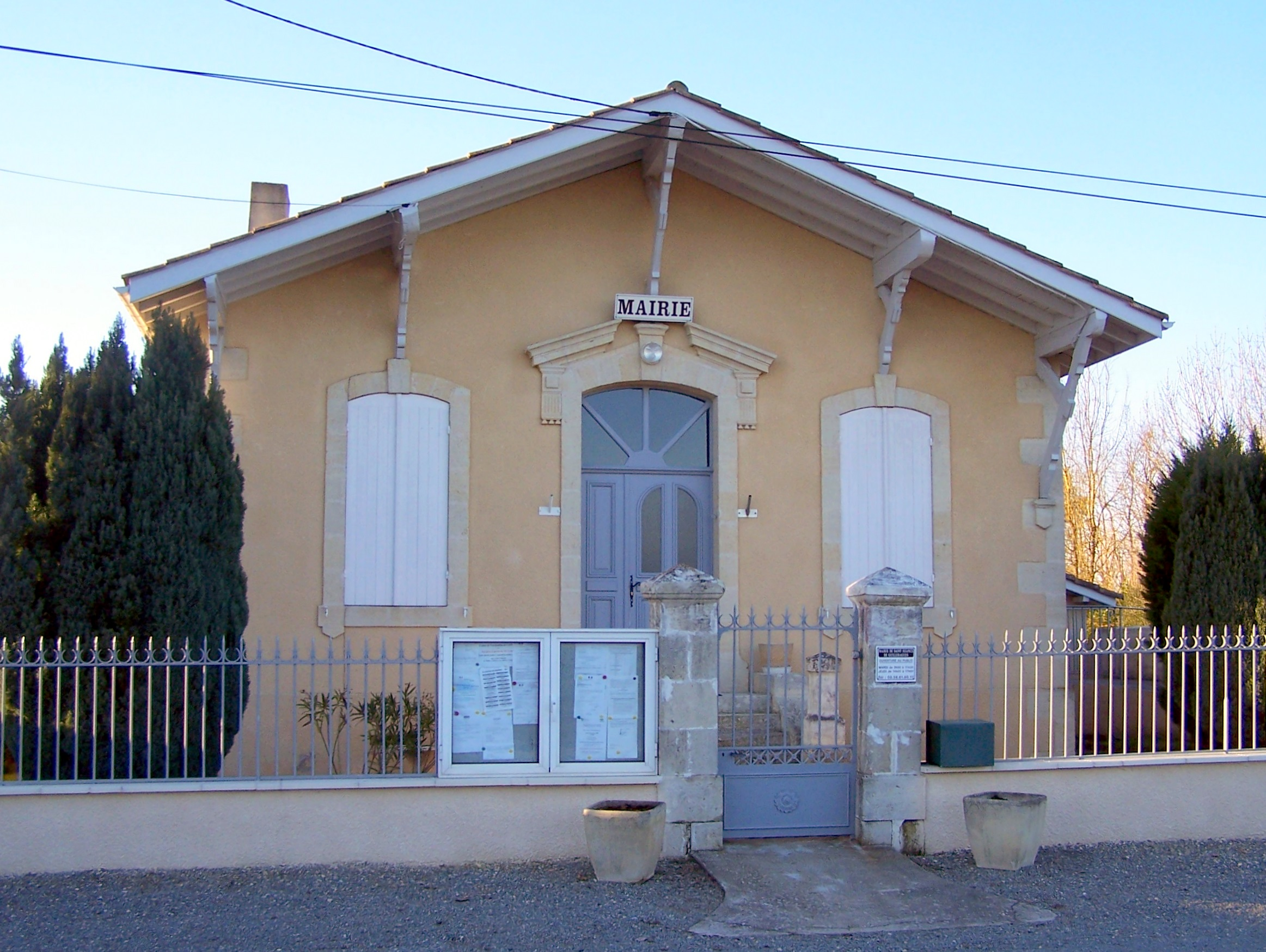
- The town hall in Saint-Sulpice-de-Guilleragues

- Coat of arms
- Location of Saint-Sulpice-de-Guilleragues
- Location within France Location within Nouvelle-Aquitaine
- Coordinates: 44°37′48″N 0°03′03″E
- Country: France
- Region: Nouvelle-Aquitaine
- Department: Gironde
- Arrondissement: Langon
- Canton: Le Réolais et Les Bastides

Government
  - Mayor (2020–2026): Maryse Christine Cheyrou
- Area^{1}: 6.89 km^{2} (2.66 sq mi)
- Elevation: 61 m (200 ft)
- Highest elevation: 102 m (335 ft)
- Lowest elevation: 18 m (59 ft)
- Population (2023): 234
  - Density: 34.0/km^{2} (88.0/sq mi)
- Time zone: UTC+01:00 (CET)
  - Summer (DST): UTC+02:00 (CEST)
- INSEE/Postal code: 33481 /33580
- ^{1} French Land Register data, which excludes lakes, ponds, glaciers > 1 km^{2} (0.386 sq mi or 247 acres) and river estuaries.

Saint-Sulpice-de-Guilleragues (French pronunciation: [sɛ̃ sylpis də ɡijʁaɡ]; Occitan: Sent Sulpici de Guilheragas) is a commune in the Gironde department in Nouvelle-Aquitaine in southwestern France.

== Population ==
Historical population
Year	Pop.	±% p.a.
1968	240	—
1975	202	−2.43%
1982	219	+1.16%
1990	224	+0.28%
1999	227	+0.15%
2007	222	−0.28%
2012	222	+0.00%
2017	229	+0.62%
2023	234	+0.36%
Source: INSEE

== See also ==
- Communes of the Gironde department
