= Geoffrey IV of Anjou =

Geoffrey IV (1070/75 – 19 May 1106), called Martel (the Hammer), was Count of Anjou from 1103 until his early death, either co-ruling with his father, Fulk IV, or in opposition to him. He was popular with the Church and grew a reputation for curbing tyranny and opposing his violent father, who, according to Orderic Vitalis, enjoyed pillaging and terrorising his subjects.

Geoffrey was a son of Fulk's second wife, Ermengard of Bourbon. His father tried to disinherit him in favour of Fulk the Younger, his son by his fourth wife, Bertrada of Montfort. Fulk, by then an old man, had previously delegated much of his authority to Geoffrey. With the support of his father's adversaries, Geoffrey seems to have achieved recognition from his father and from 1103 styled himself "count" (comes in the Latin of the day) and took control of the government. He allied with Renaud de Martigné, Bishop of Angers, against the baron Maurice of Craon. An anonymous poem by a scholar or cleric addressed to a certain Philip, probably Philip of Melun, son of Philip I of France through his dalliance with Bertrada, is an encomium of a "Count Martel" (Martellus consul), probably Geoffrey IV. The poem is didactic and upholds the count, only named as Martel, as an exemplar of good rulership. The last lines offer hope that he may "long prosper", and so must have been written during the brief period of his rule in Anjou.

Geoffrey was besieging a rebellious baron in the castle of Candé when, on 19 May 1106, he was struck and killed by an arrow while going to negotiations. The Chronica de gestis consulum Andegavorum attributed this assassination to Fulk and Bertrada, and praised the late count as "an admirable man, distinguished in justice, a cultivator or the whole of goodness, who was a terror to all his enemies." The Annales Vindocinenses call him "a subduer and conqueror of tyrants [perhaps his father], protector and defender of churches."

== Bibliography ==
- Bachrach, Bernard S. "Henry II and the Angevin Tradition of Family Hostility". Albion: A Quarterly Journal Concerned with British Studies 16/2 (1984): 111–30.
- Halphen, Louis. Le comté d'Anjou au XIe siècle. Paris: A. Picard, 1906.
- Jaeger, C. Stephen. The Origins of Courtliness: Civilizing Trends and the Formation of Courtly Ideals, 939–1210. Philadelphia: University of Pennsylvania Press, 1985.
- Ziolkowski, Jan M.; Balint, Bridget K.; et al. A Garland of Satire, Wisdom, and History: Latin Verse from Twelfth-Century France (Carmina Houghtoniensia). Cambridge, Massachusetts: Harvard University Press, 2007.
