= Sacrae Domus Militiae Templi =

Sacrae Domus Militiae Templi Hierosolymitani magistri : Untersuchungen z. Geschichte d. Templerordens 1118/19-1314 is a work of scholarship by the German author Marie Luise Bulst-Thiele. Published in 1974, the 416-page book covers the medieval order of the Knights Templar and is often cited by other medieval historians.

It has been cited with the abbreviations of B-T and M. Sacrae domus.
