= Marie Luise Bulst-Thiele =

German historian

Marie Luise Bulst-Thiele (1906–1992) was a German historian, known for writing about the Knights Templar. Her works are often cited by other medieval historians in their discussions of Templar historiography. In his own work Trial of the Templars, British historian Malcolm Barber discusses Bulst-Thiele's views on the Templars, as that she sees the attack on the Knights Templar as an integral element of the relations between the administration of King Philip IV of France and the Papacy. (Barber, p. 300). With Walther Bulst she had four sons, among them Neithard Bulst (born 1941), history professor in Bielefeld.

== Works ==
- Sacrae Domus Militiae Templi, 1974
- Kaiserin Agnes, 1933
- Aristoteles im Mittelalter und Vergilius im Mittelalter, 1932
- "Templer in königlichen und päpstlichen Diensten." In Festschrift Percy Ernst Schramm: zu seinem siebzigsten Geburtstag von Schülern und Freunden zugeeignet, edited by Peter Classen, Peter Scheibert. Wiesbaden: Steiner, 1964.
- "Warum wollte Philipp IV. den Templerorden vernichten? Ein neuer Aspekt." In I Templari: Mito e Storia, edited by G. Minnucci. Sinalunga, 1989.
- "The Influence of St. Bernard of Clairvaux on the Formation of the Order of the Knights Templar." In The Second Crusade and the Cistercians, edited by Michael Gervers, 57-65. New York: St. Martin’s Press, 1992.
- "Die Anfänge des Templerordens. Bernhard von Clairvaux. Cîteaux" (The Beginnings of the Templars Order. Bernhard of Clairvaux. Citeaux, 1993
