= Ignatius III Jādida =

Syriac Orthodox bishop (died 1138)

Ignatius III Jādida (died 1138) was a Syriac Orthodox churchman who served successively as the bishop of Edessa (1118/19–1120), bishop of Amida (1120–1125), and archbishop of Jerusalem (1125–1138). He oversaw an extensive work on church property in Jerusalem and is also known for a land dispute with Geoffrey of the Tower of David that came to involve King Fulk and Queen Melisende.

== Early career ==
Ignatius was the son of Busayr of Ğādina. He was taken from his parents into the care of the Syriac Orthodox patriarch of Antioch, Athanasius VI bar Khamoro. Athanasius appointed him successor to the deposed bishop of Edessa, Basil Abu Gâlib Bar Şabünî, in 1118/19, but then transferred him to Amida, where he was bishop for five years. He spent a winter in a monastery near modern-day Siverek, recuperating from an illness.

== Archiepiscopacy ==
Ignatius was appointed to succeed Ignatius II Hesnūn as archbishop of Jerusalem. He set out in June and on his way ordained many priests and deacons at the patriarch's best before arriving in Jerusalem on 12 October 1125. The city was then the capital of the Kingdom of Jerusalem, a crusader state established by Franks, who were Latin Christians. Ignatius had a good relationship with Queen Melisende; this was aided by her links to the Oriental Orthodox Churches through her mother, Queen Morphia. Ignatius oversaw an extensive work on the Syriac Church land, including the construction of cisterns, a tower with a church, and a hostel in Jerusalem for pilgrims with a courtyard across from the Church of St Mary Magdalene and Simon the Pharisee.

=== Land dispute ===
The Syriac Orthodox Church had lost land during the First Crusade to a Frankish knight, Geoffrey of the Tower of David. Geoffrey was captured by the Egyptians in 1106, and during his captivity, the Syriac Orthodox regained its territory. Geoffrey returned in 1137 and laid claim to the land, including the 'Adasiyya monastery. King Fulk approved his request. Faced with this threat, Ignatius appealed to Queen Melisende, who sent a message to the king and let it be known that all who supported Ignatius would have her favor. Ignatius then travelled at Bethgibelin to meet with the king, who welcomed him warmly. Geoffrey too arrived and refused to relent under pressure from the king and the Latin patriarch of Jerusalem, William of Malines. Ignatius and his entourage could only secure the promise that the case would not be decided until it could be heard in the queen's presence.

On 3 February, Ignatius and his companions went to seek permission from the patriarch and the king to depart from Bethgibelin. Upon seeing them approach the patriarch's tent, the king left his company to greet the bishop, assuring him of his full support. Ignatius expressed his loyalty to the king and queen and readiness to comply. After being admonished by the king, Geoffrey greeted Ignatius peacefully and swore that he would no longer pursue his claim. In an act of goodwill, Ignatius promised to pay Geoffrey 200 dinars.

== Death and legacy ==
Ignatius ensured that the churches in Jerusalem were well supplied, and personally copied a book of liturgical chants when his hand was already frail. He also oversaw the work of the monk Romanus on a Gospel lectionary and likely dictated part of his own biography to Romanus. Ignatius' health was already failing in February 1137. He died on 27 May 1138 in Acre and was succeeded by Romanus.
