= Templum Domini =

Crusader-era church in the repurposed Dome of the Rock, Jerusalem

Coordinates: 31.7781°N 35.2353°E

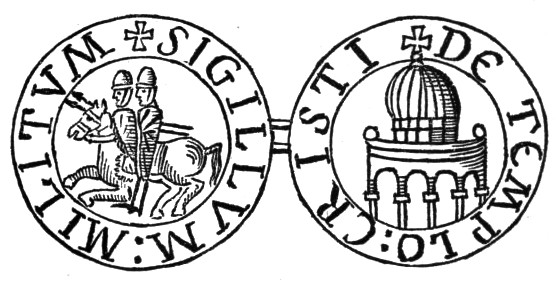
Knights Templar Seal of the Crusader period, showing the Dome of the Rock on the reverse.

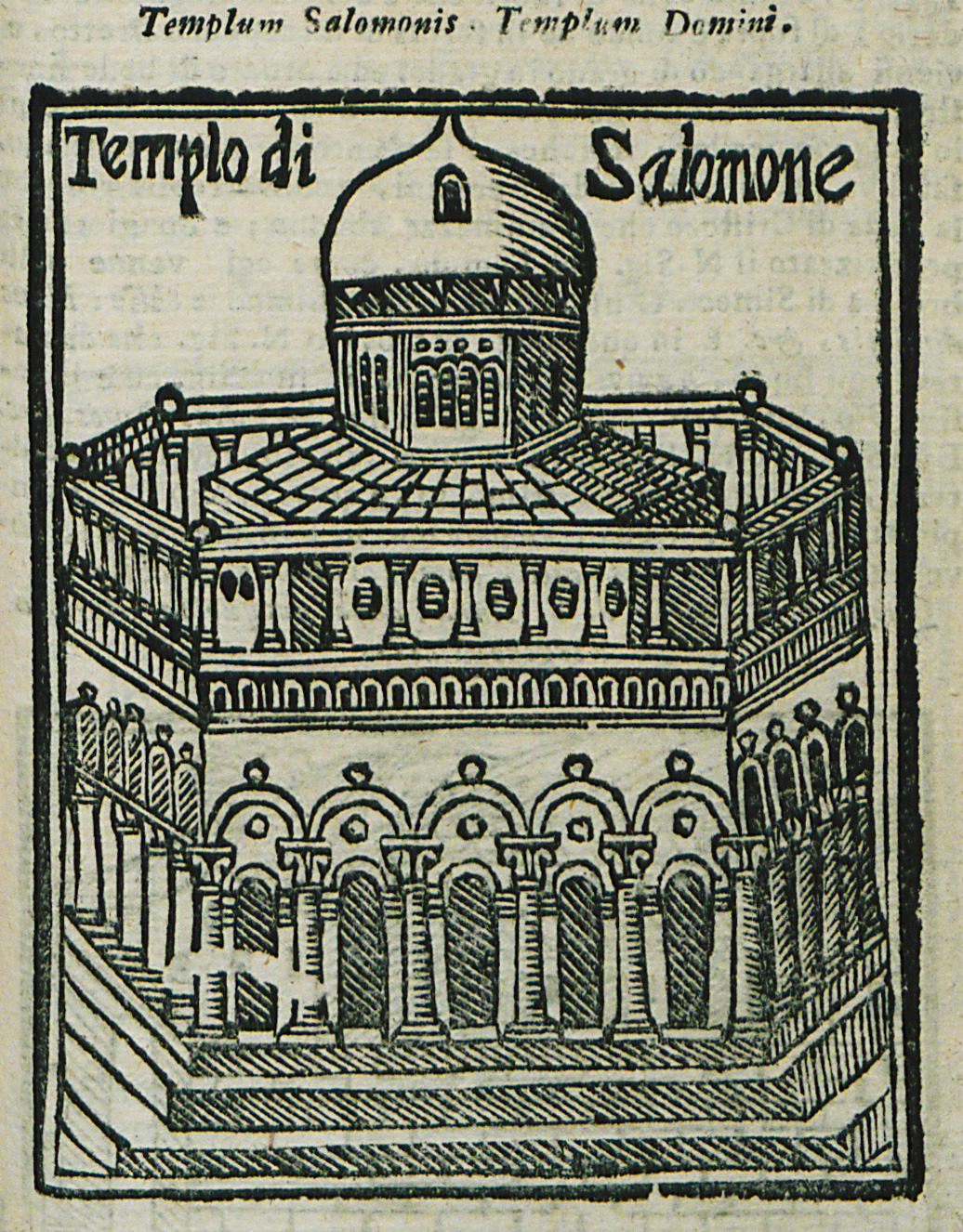
The Temple of Solomon was anachronistically depicted as the Dome of the Rock in Western iconography well into the early modern period (here in a print by Salvatore & Giandomenico Marescandoli of Lucca, 1600)

The Templum Domini (English: "Temple of the Lord") was a Christian church christened by the Crusaders as a repurposing of the Dome of the Rock in Jerusalem. It became an important symbol of Jerusalem, depicted on coins minted under the Kingdom of Jerusalem.

== History ==
The Dome of the Rock was erected in the late 7th century under Abd al-Malik ibn Marwan, the 5th Umayyad caliph, at the site of the former Second Temple or possibly added to an existing Byzantine building dating to the reign of Heraclius, 610–641.

After the capture of Jerusalem in the First Crusade (1099), the Dome of the Rock was given into the care of the Augustinians. At first, the rock around which the shrine had been built was left uncovered and the canons placed an altar on it. Later, the rock was covered with white marble, and an altar choir constructed upon it, a work that likely was completed only in 1140. In 1138, the Templum Domini was raised to the status of an abbey under Geoffrey and on 1 April 1141, the church was dedicated solemnly by papal legate Alberic of Ostia, possibly to Mary, mother of Jesus.

The adjacent al-Aqsa Mosque was called Templum Solomonis ("Temple of Solomon") by the Crusaders. It first became a royal palace. The image of the Dome, as representing the "Temple of Solomon", became an important iconographic element in the Kingdom of Jerusalem. The seals of the monarch of Jerusalem depicted the city symbolically by combining the Tower of David, the Church of the Holy Sepulchre, the Dome of the Rock and the city walls.

After the completion of the purpose-built royal palace near the Jaffa Gate and to the south of the Tower of David, the king gave the building to the Catholic monastic-military order, the Knights Templar, who maintained it as their headquarters. The Dome was indicated on the reverse of the seal of the grand master of the Knights Templar of the grand masters of the Knights Templar such as Everard des Barres and Renaud de Vichiers, and it is possibly the architectural model for round churches across Europe.

Although the adjacent Dome of the Ascension was constructed as a baptistry during the Crusader period, it has since remained in the hands of Muslim authorities as part of the larger complex of the Dome of the Rock. It was turned back into a mosque after the Crusades.

== See also ==
- History of Jerusalem during the Kingdom of Jerusalem

== Sources ==
- Hamilton, Bernard; Jotischky, Andrew (22 October 2020). Latin and Greek Monasticism in the Crusader States. Cambridge University Press. ISBN 978-0-521-83638-8.
