= Patriarchal Vicariate of Jerusalem and Jordan =

Syriac orthodox Church
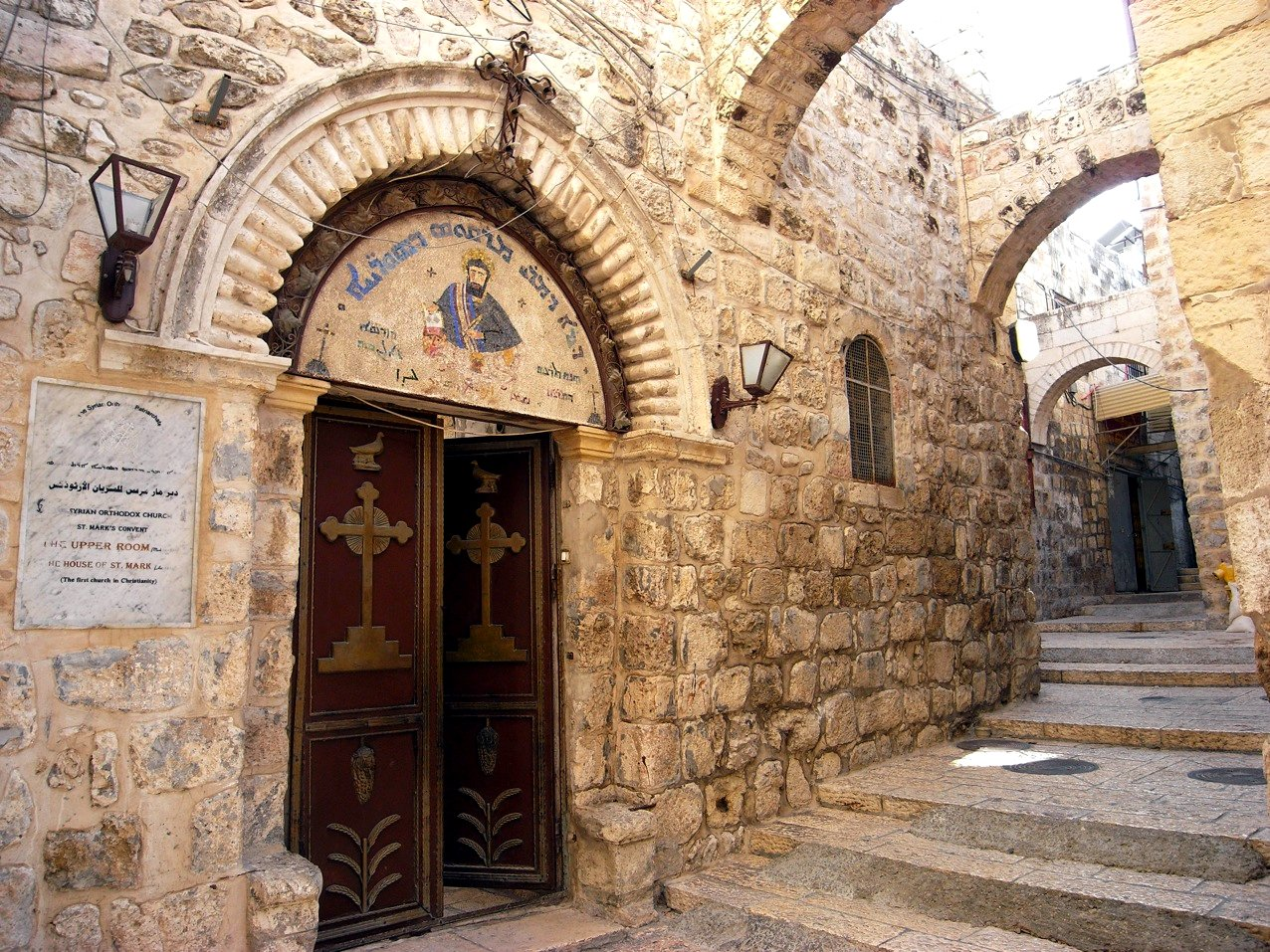
- Monastery of Saint Mark
- Incumbent; Anthimos Jack Yakoub
- Style: Archbishop His Eminence

Information
- Cathedral: Monastery of Saint Mark, Jerusalem

The Patriarchal Vicariate of Jerusalem and Jordan is a nominally metropolitan archeparchy of the Syriac Orthodox Church. The incumbent patriarchal vicar of Jerusalem and Jordan is Mor Anthimos Jack Yakoub. There has been a Syriac Orthodox bishop in Jerusalem since at least 793.

== History ==
The first Syriac Orthodox church in Jerusalem was probably built between the Sasanian conquest (614) and the Islamic conquest (637). The Patriarch Michael the Syrian (died 1199) implies that the church torn down by Harun al-Rashid in 806/807 predated the Islamic conquest. It was soon rebuilt by an Egyptian named Macarius of Naburwah. Since almost all of the known bishops were monks, there must also have been at least a rudimentary monastic community.

The church appears to have been destroyed at the time of the destruction of the Church of the Holy Sepulchre. In 1092, Mansur of Tilbana, another Egyptian, built what was then the only Syriac Orthodox church in the city. In the first quarter of the 12th century, Bishop Ignatius II Hesnūn rebuilt the destroyed church and monastery. It was dedicated to Saint Mary Magdalene and later also to Simon the Pharisee. Shortly after 1125, Ignatius III Jādida constructed a hostel with a courtyard across from the church. According to John of Würzburg, writing later in the century, this church was believed to have formerly been the house of Simon the Leper.

After the Ayyyubid conquest in 1187, the church and monastery were transformed into a Muslim school. The bishops were only able again to occupy it again briefly when the city was in Christian hands between the Sixth Crusade (1229) and the Khwarazmian conquest (1244). Thereafter the Syriac Orthodox used the small church of Saint Thomas of the Germans until it was handed over to the Muslim authorities by the incumbent monk, who converted to Islam in 1451/1452.

The Syriac Orthodox patriarch acquired the Monastery of Saint Mark from the Coptic Orthodox in 1472 and this has served ever since as the church of the bishops of Jerusalem. There was a deputy metropolitan of Jerusalem from the early 18th century to the office's abolition in 1858, who resided at the Monastery of Saint Mark, whilst the metropolitan resided at the Mor Hananyo Monastery in Tur Abdin. In 1870, there were 150 Syriac Orthodox Christians at Jerusalem and Bethlehem, making it the smallest Syriac Orthodox diocese.

In the aftermath of the Sayfo, a number of Syriac Orthodox Christians took refuge at Jerusalem and Bethlehem. Syriac Orthodox Christians from Isfis, Maserteh, Azekh, and Tur Abdin moved to Bethlehem. The 1922 census of Palestine recorded 813 Syriac Orthodox Christians in Mandatory Palestine, including 406 in Bethlehem, 371 in Jerusalem, 18 in Fassuta, 4 in Nablus, 4 in Jaffa, 3 in Caesarea, 2 in Ramleh, 2 in "Railway Groups" in Gaza Subdistrict, 1 in Ramallah, 1 in Haifa, and 1 in Acre. The Church of the Mother of God at Bethlehem was constructed in 1927. Many Syriac Orthodox Christians left Jerusalem and Bethlehem after the 1948 Arab–Israeli War and 1976 Arab–Israeli War. The Church of Saint Ephrem at Ashrafiye in Amman in Jordan was constructed in 1948 for Syriac Orthodox Christians who had emigrated there from Palestine. By 1998, there were 100 Syriac Orthodox families at Jerusalem and 400 at Bethlehem. The patriarchal vicariate had 7 clergy in 2005, including 5 at Jerusalem, of whom 4 were monks, 1 at Bethlehem, and 1 at Amman. There were 330 Syriac Orthodox households, consisting of around 1100 people, at Bethlehem by 2017.

== Ecclesiastical properties ==
The following ecclesiastical properties belong to the archdiocese:

- Monastery of Saint Mark, Jerusalem
- Chapel of Saint Joseph of Arimathea and Saint Nicodemus in the Church of the Holy Sepulchre.
- Church of the Mother of God, Bethlehem, Palestine.
- Church of Saint Ephrem, Amman, Jordan.

The archdiocese also possesses minor rights of worship at the following churches:

- Church of the Nativity
- Church of the Tomb of the Virgin Mary

== List of bishops ==
The Syriac Orthodox Register of Episcopal Ordinations only goes back to 793. Michael the Syrian appended to his Chronicle a list of bishops of Jerusalem from James, brother of Jesus, down to his own time. It is identical to the Register for the bishops after 793. The bishops were of metropolitan rank.

In the following list, a date range like 792×818 means "ordained between 792 and 818". Bishops before 793 cannot be dated at all. The list begins with the first bishop elected in opposition to the Council of Chalcedon (451), but the numbering takes into account the earlier bishops of Jerusalem.

- Theodosius (451–453)
- Severus (590–635)
- Anastasius
- Martyrius
- Sallustianus
- Elias
- Cyril II
- Jeremy I
- Thomas I
- John I
- Philoxenus I
- Timothy I (792×818)
- Job (816×845)
- Ignatius I (816×846)
- Joseph III (816×846)
- John II (845×875)
- Cyril III Noah (845×875)
- Cyriacus
- Severus (877×884)
- Joseph IV (909×924)
- Theodore (909×924)
- Cyril IV (922×936)
- Jeremy II (935×954)
- Thomas II (964×986)
- John III (1006×1031)
- Philoxenus II (1003×1031)
- Zacharias (1041×1058)
- Thomas III (1041×1058)
- Timothy II (1062×1074) (Note: Barsoum places Timothy II's episcopate in c. 1080.)
- John IV (1079×1083)
- Cyril V (1090×1130)
- David (1090×1130)
- Ignatius II Hesnūn (1090×1130, died 1124/1125)
- Ignatius III Jādida (1123×1140)
- Ignatius IV Romanus (1138×1167) (Note: Barsoum places Ignatius IV Romanus' episcopate in 1139–1183.)
- Athanasius (1167×1200)
- Ignatius V Sahdo (1167×1200) (Note: Barsoum places Ignatius V Sahdo's episcopate from 1193 to his death in the first decade of the 13th century.)
- Basil (fl. 1292–1295)
- Basil Simon (?–1421/1422)
- Gregorius Joseph al-Gurji (c. 1510/1512–1537) (Note: Gregorius Joseph al-Gurji was metropolitan of Jerusalem, Homs, Damascus, Tripoli, and Mardin for a time.)
- Gregorius Bahnam (c. 1530)
- John of Mardin (d. 1577)
- Gregorius John of Gargar (d. 1585×1587) (Note: John of Gargar was metropolitan of Jerusalem and Tripoli.)
- Gregorius Behnam of Arbo (1590–1614)
- Abd al-Azal (1640)
- Gregorius Abdal Jaleel (1664–1671)
- Gregorius Simon II (1679–1692)
- Gregorius Simon III of Salah (1693–1719)
- Gregorius ‘Abd al-Ahad (1719–1731)
- Gregorius Barsoum (1720–1727)
- Gregorius Barsoum (1729–1737)
- Gregorius Sani’a (1731–1737)
- Gregorius Thomas (1737–1748)
- Gregorius George (1748–1773)
- Gregorius Bishara of Bitlis (1774–1789) (Note: Bishara of Bitlis was metropolitan of Jerusalem and Amida from 1774 to 1783.)
- Athanasius Jacob (1785–1797)
- Dionysius Jacob (1798)
- Cyril ‘Abd al-Ahad (1799–1840)

Deputy: Gregorius Jacob (?–1847)
Deputy: Athanasius Yuhanna (1850–1864)

- Gregorius Abded Sattuf (1872–1880)
- George Kassab of Sadad (d. 1896)
- Iyawannis Elias (1896–1908)
- Gregorius Ephrem (1909–?)
- Athanasius Yeshue Samuel (1946–1957)
- Dionysius Behnan Jijjawi (1957–1996)
- Sewerus Malki Mourad (1996–2018)
- Gabriel Dahho (2019–2022)

Patriarchal delegate: Anthimos Jack Yakoub (2022–2023)

- Anthimos Jack Yakoub (2023–present)

== Bibliography ==
- Barron, J. B., ed. (1923). Palestine: Report and General Abstracts of the Census of 1922. Government of Palestine.
- Barsoum, Ephrem (2003). The Scattered Pearls: A History of Syriac Literature and Sciences. Translated by Matti Moosa (2nd ed.). Gorgias Press.
- Barsoum, Aphrem (2008). History of the Za'faran Monastery. Translated by Matti Moosa. Gorgias Press.
- Barsoum, Aphrem (2009a). History of the Syriac Dioceses. Vol. 1. Translated by Matti Moosa. Gorgias Press.
- Barsoum, Aphrem (2009b). The Collected Historical Essays of Aphram I Barsoum. Vol. 1. Translated by Matti Moosa. Gorgias Press.
- Calder, Mark D. (2017). Bethlehem’s Syriac Christians: Self, nation and church in dialogue and practice. Gorgias Press.
- Chabot, Jean-Baptiste, ed. (1905). Chronique de Michel le Syrien. Vol. III. Paris: Ernest Leroux.
- Chaillot, Christine (1998). The Syrian Orthodox Church of Antioch and All the East: A Brief Introduction to Its Life and Spirituality.
- Ignatius Jacob III (2008). History of the Monastery of Saint Matthew in Mosul. Translated by Matti Moosa. Gorgias Press.
- John of Würzburg (1890). Description of the Holy Land. Translated by Aubrey Stewart. London: Palestine Pilgrims' Text Society.
- Kiraz, George A. (2011). "ʿAbdullāh II Saṭṭūf". In Sebastian P. Brock; Aaron M. Butts; George A. Kiraz; Lucas Van Rompay (eds.). Gorgias Encyclopedic Dictionary of the Syriac Heritage. Gorgias Press, electronic edition by Beth Mardutho.
- Kiraz, George A.; Van Rompay, Lucas (2011). "Jerusalem". In Sebastian P. Brock; Aaron M. Butts; George A. Kiraz; Lucas Van Rompay (eds.). Gorgias Encyclopedic Dictionary of the Syriac Heritage. Gorgias Press. pp. 227–229.
- Palmer, Andrew (1991). "The History of the Syrian Orthodox in Jerusalem". Oriens Christianus. 75: 16–43.
- Palmer, Andrew (1992). "The History of the Syrian Orthodox in Jerusalem, Part II: Queen Melisende and the Jacobite Estates". Oriens Christianus. 76: 74–94.
