= Alice of Jerusalem =

Alice of Jerusalem may refer to:

- Alice of Antioch (c. 1110–after 1151), daughter of Baldwin II of Jerusalem and wife of Bohemund II of Antioch
- Alice of Cyprus (1196–1246), daughter of Henry II of Champagne and wife of Hugh I of Cyprus and then Bohemund V of Antioch
