= Melisende of Jerusalem =

Queen of Jerusalem from 1131 to 1152

Melisende
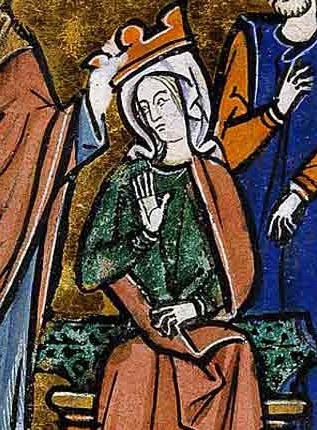

Queen of Jerusalem
- Reign: 1131–1152
- Coronations: 14 September 1131; 25 December 1143
- Predecessor: Baldwin II
- Successor: Baldwin III
- Co-rulers: Fulk (1131–1143); Baldwin III (1143–1152)
- Born: c. 1109
- Died: 11 September 1161 (aged 51–52)
- Burial: Abbey of Saint Mary of the Valley of Jehosaphat
- Spouse: Fulk V of Anjou (m. 1129; died 1143)
- Issue: Baldwin III of Jerusalem; Amalric of Jerusalem
- House: House of Rethel
- Father: Baldwin II of Jerusalem
- Mother: Morphia of Melitene

Melisende (c. 1109 – 11 September 1161) was the queen of Jerusalem from 1131 to 1152. She was the first female ruler of the Kingdom of Jerusalem and the first woman to hold a public office in the crusader kingdom. Her fame grew during her lifetime for her generous support of Christian communities across her kingdom. Contemporary chronicler William of Tyre praised her wisdom and abilities, while modern historians vary in their assessment.

Melisende had mixed Frankish–Armenian heritage and was the eldest daughter of King Baldwin II and Queen Morphia. In the late 1120s, when it became clear that her father was unlikely to have a son, she was declared heir presumptive to the throne and married Fulk of Anjou in 1129. Baldwin II died in 1131, having conferred the kingdom on Melisende, Fulk, and their son Baldwin III. Melisende and Fulk were crowned shortly after.

Early in their joint reign, King Fulk attempted to rule without Queen Melisende. Barons led by Melisende's relative Count Hugh II of Jaffa revolted in 1134 and, although Hugh was defeated and exiled, Melisende grew powerful and terrorized the king and his supporters until he agreed to give her a share of the government. Once reconciled, they had another son, Amalric, and Fulk no longer made any decision in the kingdom without Melisende's assent. During their joint rule, Melisende managed church relations and patronage. The couple eschewed wars of conquest and instead focused on strengthening the kingdom's defenses. After Fulk died in 1143, Melisende assumed full power and was crowned together with their elder son, Baldwin III. Baldwin reached the age of majority in 1145, but Melisende refused to cede any authority to him. After the fall of Edessa in 1144, Melisende urged a military intervention from Europe, which led to the Second Crusade.

Melisende's relationship with Baldwin III collapsed in 1150 as she further reduced his role in state affairs. In 1152, the High Court of Jerusalem divided the kingdom between mother and son. Within weeks, however, Baldwin invaded Melisende's portion and besieged her in the Tower of David. Melisende agreed to step down and retire to Nablus. She continued to involve herself in the affairs of her family, which also ruled the crusader states of Antioch and Tripoli. Although her influence in Jerusalem became limited, she counseled Baldwin and took a successful military initiative in his absence. Her patronage and involvement in ecclesiastical matters also continued. She died in 1161 after becoming incapacitated by an illness, possibly a stroke.

== Background ==
Melisende was the eldest daughter of the Frankish count of Edessa, Baldwin II, and Morphia of Melitene, an Armenian noblewoman of the Greek Orthodox faith. She was likely born in Edessa sometime between 1104 and 1109 or slightly later. Her mixed heritage reflected the ethnoreligious diversity of the Latin East. She and her sisters Alice and Hodierna would have grown up speaking Armenian and probably Greek, but also became proficient in French.

In early 1118, Melisende's father set out on a pilgrimage to Jerusalem. During this journey, the king of Jerusalem, Baldwin I, died. Baldwin II was elected to succeed him. His wife and daughters stayed in Edessa while he consolidated his position in the kingdom. In late 1119, Baldwin sent for his family, and the new count of Edessa, Baldwin's cousin Joscelin of Courtenay, arranged for them to be escorted south. The cultural setting of Jerusalem was a distinct departure from what Melisende had experienced growing up in Edessa: alongside the Franks, the city's population was largely Arabic- and Syriac-speaking. Melisende's parents were crowned king and queen on Christmas. They had another daughter, Ioveta, the following year.

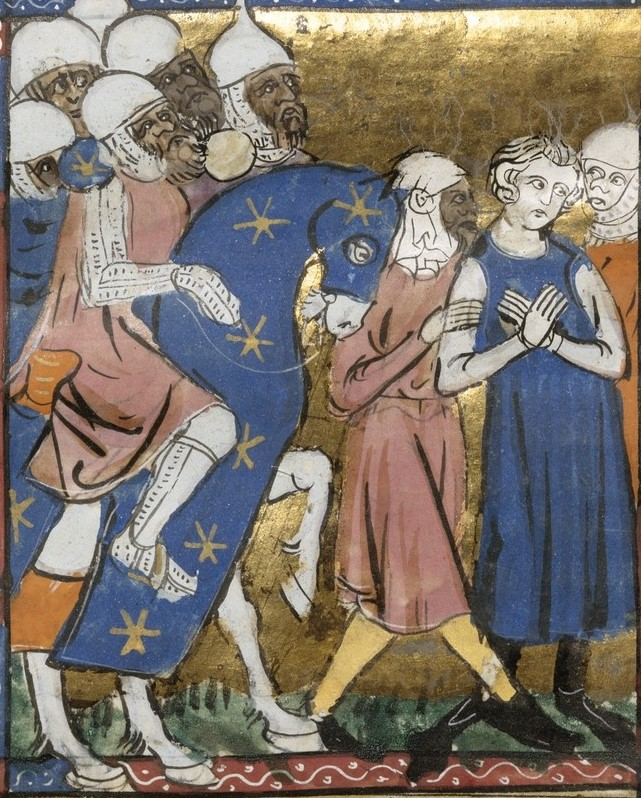
Melisende's father spent 18 months in captivity, but neither Melisende nor her mother governed in his stead.

Baldwin II was the first Latin ruler of Jerusalem to have children but all four of his children were daughters, and no conventions had yet developed in the crusader states regarding female succession. Baldwin and Morphia's marriage was happy despite there being no male heir to the kingdom. Michael, a contemporary Syriac Orthodox monk, credits Morphia with instilling "the fear of God" in Melisende, suggesting that she may have played a greater role than Baldwin in Melisende's spiritual upbringing. Like Baldwin I's wives Arda of Armenia and Adelaide del Vasto, Morphia took no part in the affairs of state. During the 18 months Baldwin spent in Muslim captivity in 1123–24, the kingdom was ruled first by the constable, Eustace I Grenier, and then by William of Bures, prince of Galilee; neither Melisende nor her mother were involved in government. The rulers of Jerusalem were expected not only to govern but to personally lead armies against near-constant threats from Muslim powers on the northern, eastern, and southern borders. This militarized model of kingship made female rule particularly problematic, as it clashed with entrenched expectations of a warrior-king.

Archbishop William of Tyre, the chief chronicler of the 12th-century kingdom, does not explicitly describe Melisende's appearance or education. He was only born in 1130, and from the death of Fulcher of Chartres in 1127, there was no resident chronicler in the crusader states. William was studying in Europe from 1145 to 1165 and only started writing his History of Deeds Done Beyond the Sea in 1167. The intervening period is therefore poorly documented and frequently invites speculative interpretation by historians.

== Heir to the kingdom ==
Melisende remained unmarried unusually long for a noblewoman. Her father may have still hoped to produce a son; until then, Melisende remained a potential successor, and the king likely hesitated to settle for a match unworthy of that status, just as appropriate suitors may have been wary of her uncertain future. Queen Morphia died probably in 1126 or 1127. Because he no longer expected to have a son, King Baldwin started providing for his daughters and settling his succession: Melisende was to be his heir; Alice was married to Prince Bohemond II of Antioch; Hodierna may have been betrothed to Raymond of Tripoli at this time; and Ioveta, the youngest, was sent to the Convent of Saint Anne.

In late 1127, Baldwin and his advisors convened to discuss Melisende's marriage, which was now a matter of priority. They decided to offer her hand to Count Fulk V of Anjou. Aged around 37, Fulk was considerably older than Melisende and had 17 years of experience as ruler of Anjou. He had been to Jerusalem on a pilgrimage in 1120 and made a favorable impression on the nobles. His wife, Eremburga of Maine, had died in late 1126, and he already had grown children. An embassy led by the noblemen William of Bures and Guy I Brisebarre arrived at Fulk's court in early 1128.

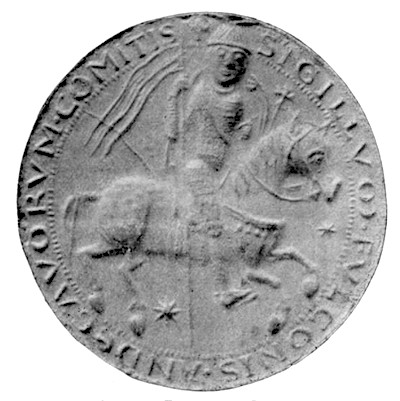
Fulk, depicted here on his seal as count of Anjou, was already an experienced ruler when he was selected to marry Melisende.

Before he would agree to a marriage contract and leave his land, Fulk insisted that Melisende's position as heir be firmly established. A useful precedent was the formal recognition of Empress Matilda, who married Fulk's son Geoffrey Plantagenet in June 1128, as the heir presumptive to her father, King Henry I of England. Ioveta's status as porphyrogenita (born to crowned parents) may have complicated her eldest sister's position; Fulk knew that Henry had invoked the principle of porphyrogeniture to justify his accession to the throne of England ahead of his older brother Robert Curthose. Ioveta was still a child, however, and a more serious threat may have come from Alice and Bohemond. The contemporary chronicler Matthew of Edessa records that Baldwin had promised the succession to Bohemond on the occasion of Bohemond's marriage to Alice. The historian Alan V. Murray suggests that it is more plausible that any such plan originated with Alice and Bohemond. The other potential claimants were Baldwin's nephews Ithier of Rethel and Manasses of Hierges. During the negotiations with Fulk, Baldwin started associating Melisende with himself in official documents: in a charter from March 1129 she is listed first among the witnesses, taking precedence even over all the clergy, but is titled only "daughter of the king". In a later charter, she again heads the list of witnesses and is explicitly called "daughter of the king and heir of the kingdom".

Having relinquished his counties to his son Geoffrey, Fulk arrived in the Kingdom of Jerusalem with the embassy in May 1129. Melisende married him before 2 June. Steven Runciman assumes that the marriage was celebrated in Jerusalem, but Jaroslav Folda notes that it could as easily have been in Acre and that most recent historians prefer not to speculate. King Baldwin bestowed upon them the cities of Acre and Tyre as Melisende's dowry. These were the most lucrative parts of the royal domain and were to be held by the couple during the king's lifetime. In the first half of 1130, Melisende gave birth to a son, Baldwin, which further secured the succession.

Prince Bohemond II, the husband of Melisende's sister Alice, died in 1130, leaving their only child, the two-year-old Constance, as heir to the Principality of Antioch. Alice attempted to seize control of Antioch, but her and Melisende's father, King Baldwin II, advanced north to prevent her. Baldwin declined to assume direct rule in Antioch, probably wishing to focus on preparing Melisende and her husband, Fulk, for the government of Jerusalem; instead, he appointed Count Joscelin I of Edessa as regent until Constance's marriage could be arranged.

== Reign ==
=== Succession ===
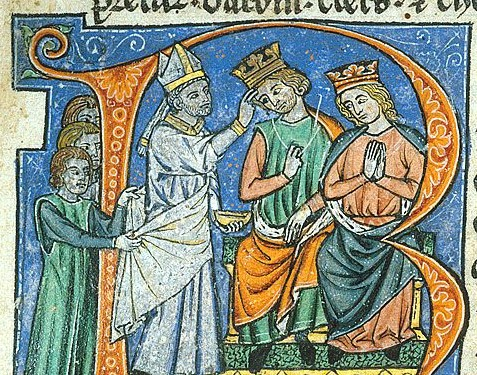
The coronation of Fulk and Melisende was the first to be held at the Holy Sepulchre.

King Baldwin II fell seriously ill after his intervention in Antioch in 1130 and may have been confined to the palace upon his return to Jerusalem. Melisende and Fulk were present for one of his last recorded acts, a donation to the priory of the Holy Sepulchre. In August 1131, the couple were summoned, together with their infant son, Baldwin, to the house of the Latin patriarch of Jerusalem, where the gravely ill king chose to spend his final days. There, before the patriarch, William of Messines, and a gathering of prelates and nobles, Baldwin II commended the kingdom to Melisende, Fulk, and their son. He died shortly thereafter, on 21 August. The patriarch crowned Fulk and Melisende in the Church of the Holy Sepulchre on 14 September, the Feast of the Cross. They were the first king and queen to be crowned in that church. Joscelin I of Edessa, who had been entrusted with Antioch, died shortly after Baldwin II, and Fulk was invited by the Antiochene nobles to establish a new government in the principality, thus thwarting Melisende's sister Alice in her second attempt to claim authority there.

=== Struggle with Fulk ===
Early in her queenship, Melisende found herself deprived of the power she had during her father's lifetime. King Fulk did not associate her with himself in any of his public acts for the first five years of the new reign. His attempt to sideline Melisende was in contravention of both their marriage contract and the last will of her father, King Baldwin II. Melisende's exclusion from power was not just a matter of protocol: without a role in the government she could not make appointments and grant land. In 1134, noblemen led by Melisende's second cousin and vassal, Count Hugh II of Jaffa, revolted against Fulk. The conflict likely originated from Fulk's displacement of the established nobility from key posts—such as castellans and officers—in favor of newcomers from Anjou. The noblemen may have expected to be protected by the queen from the king's designs if they succeeded in restoring her to the place in government which her father had intended for her. The historian Malcolm Barber argues that Melisende must have been involved in the revolt, but concedes that her role is unknown.

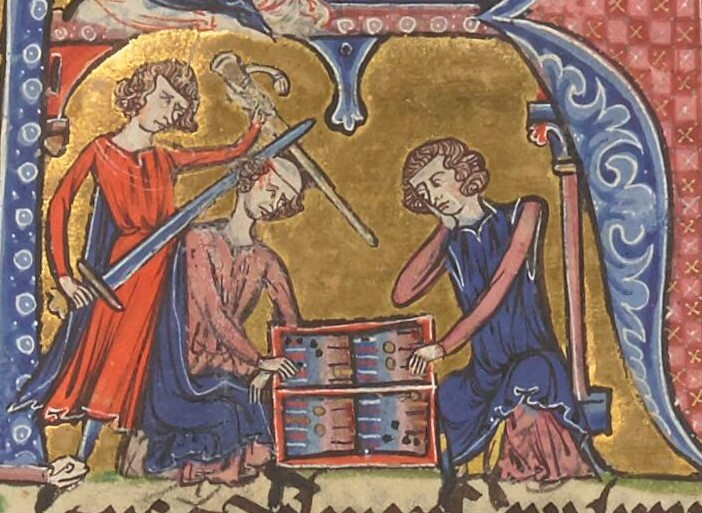
A knight stabs Count Hugh, who is playing dice in the street. Royal involvement was widely suspected.

Archbishop William of Tyre recorded the rumor that the queen was having an illicit relationship with the "young and very handsome" Count Hugh, drawing the king's ire. The historian Hans E. Mayer points out that William himself did not believe the rumor and that a medieval queen, being constantly attended by the members of her household and the court, would have found it exceedingly difficult to have a secret lover. Hamilton maintains that public opinion, spearheaded by the clergy, would have sided with Fulk and not, as it did, with Melisende if she had committed adultery. At court, Hugh was publicly charged with high treason by his stepson, Walter I Grenier, lord of Caesarea—a charge that William claims was instigated by Fulk. Hugh denied the accusation and was challenged to a trial by combat, but did not appear. Instead he made common cause with the Fatimids of Egypt–the Franks' principal adversaries–whose garrison from Ascalon invaded the kingdom and caused considerable damage in the south before being repelled. The patriarch mediated peace: Hugh would cede the county of Jaffa to the king and receive it back after spending three years in exile. Before he could leave for Europe, Hugh was stabbed in the street by a knight. After recovering he went into exile, where he died.

King Fulk was widely suspected of ordering the attempted assassination of Hugh; though his involvement was never proven, his reputation was severely damaged. According to William of Tyre's 13th-century French translator, Melisende long grieved that Hugh had died "for her". She was incensed by Fulk's treatment of Hugh and the slight on her honor. Fulk's men did not dare appear in her presence. The queen directed most of her wrath at the viscount of Jerusalem, Rohard the Elder, whom she held most responsible for influencing Fulk. Fulk even feared for his own life. Mayer suggests that it was for this reason that Fulk stayed in Antioch in 1135. The court was disrupted until third parties mediated a reconciliation between the king and queen. After persistent attempts, Fulk succeeded in obtaining Melisende's pardon for Rohard and his other supporters, who were then able to appear at court again. From then on Fulk, in the words of William of Tyre, "did not attempt to take the initiative, even in trivial matters, without her knowledge".

=== Co-rule with Fulk ===
==== Family affairs ====
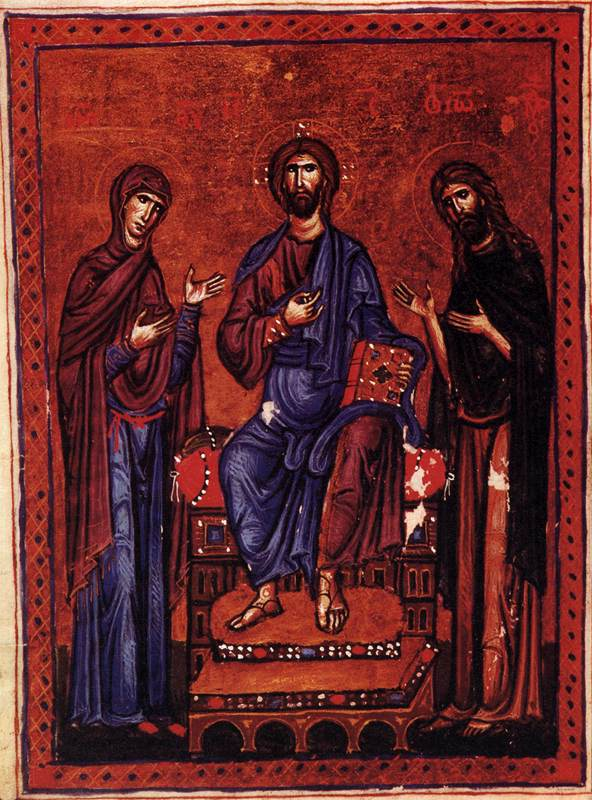
The Melisende Psalter is seen as an attempt by the king to win back his wife.

After their reconciliation, Fulk never again issued a charter pertaining to the Kingdom of Jerusalem without Melisende's consent. He did not seek Melisende's consent where he did not have to, however. He based his regency in Antioch on the decision of the barons of the principality, and Melisende had no claim to it. Maintaining hostilities with Fulk was not in Melisende's interest after she was restored to power. She needed to strengthen her succession, which had hitherto rested on only one son, and wished to influence Fulk's policies in Antioch, where her sister Alice once again seized power. Melisende did successfully intercede with Fulk not to interfere with Alice's actions. He returned from Antioch in late 1135, and the royal couple conceived another child. A son, Amalric, was born in 1136. He became Melisende's favorite child.

According to Barber and Folda's interpretations, a tangible result of Melisende and Fulk's reconciliation is the luxurious Melisende Psalter—a personal prayer book believed to have been commissioned by Fulk for Melisende around 1135, as part of his energetic attempts to ingratiate himself with her. Folda argues that the psalter, which draws on Western, Greek, and Armenian traditions, points to the recipient's artistic taste, interests, and sensibilities as queen of a diverse population.

Melisende's intervention did not guarantee Alice's fortunes for long: she lost her regency in Antioch, this time permanently, when Raymond of Poitiers arrived to marry her still-underage daughter, Constance, in 1136. The queen was also determined to make provisions for her youngest sisters, Hodierna and Ioveta, who were children when their father died. Hodierna married the count of Tripoli, Raymond II, sometime before 1138. Barber believes that the union was arranged by Melisende in an attempt to link the ruling houses of all the crusader states. Ioveta, who had grown up in a convent, took vows as a nun around 1134. According to William's chronicle, Melisende judged that Ioveta was of too high birth to be a mere nun and decided that she should be made an abbess instead. Barber notes that "there is no way of knowing" whether Ioveta wished to live a monastic life or if Melisende induced her to negate the political threat which Ioveta may have represented as the sister born during their father's kingship.

Melisende's close family and relationship with Frankish leaders

Manasses III of Rethel | Judith | Guy I of Montlhéry | Hodierna of Gometz
Gabriel of Melitene | Hugh I of Rethel | Melisende of Montlhéry | Alice of Montlhéry | Isabella of Montlhéry
Morphia of Melitene | Baldwin II of Jerusalem | Matilda of Rethel | Hodierna of Rethel | Hugh I of Jaffa | Joscelin I of Edessa
Melisende of Jerusalem m. Fulk V of Anjou | Alice of Jerusalem m. Bohemond II of Antioch | Hodierna of Jerusalem m. Raymond II of Tripoli | Ioveta of Jerusalem | Ithier of Rethel | Manasses of Hierges | Hugh II of Jaffa | Joscelin II of Edessa
Baldwin III of Jerusalem | Amalric of Jerusalem | Constance of Antioch | Raymond III of Tripoli | Melisende of Tripoli

==== Ecclesiastical and foreign relations ====
Folda proposes that in the early 1130s, Melisende contributed to the renovation of the Convent of Saint Anne, where her sister Ioveta lived. The only narrative description of Melisende's patronage, however, is William of Tyre's account of the construction of a convent in Bethany, which was close enough to Jerusalem for the queen to maintain contact. In February 1138, she and Fulk persuaded the patriarch and the canons of the Holy Sepulchre to cede the church at Bethany and its dependent villages so that a new religious community could be built there. The Convent of Saint Lazarus, as it came to be known, was in construction for six years. Melisende so generously endowed the convent with estates, golden and silver sacred vessels with precious stones, silks, and ecclesiastical robes that she made it richer than any other monastery or church in the kingdom. Initially Melisende installed an elderly abbess. When the abbess died, Ioveta succeeded as Melisende intended, and Melisende sent further gifts, namely books, ornaments, and chalices. In the construction and endowment of Bethany's convent Hamilton sees a "spectacular" example of Melisende's power of patronage.

Melisende's experience in governing likely expanded during Fulk's absences from court while engaged in military operations. In contrast to their predecessors, Fulk and Melisende showed little interest in wars of conquest, and the Fatimids sought a rapprochement with them. The couple focused instead on enforcing the blockade of Ascalon and securing the borders of the kingdom against the Turkoman atabeg of Mosul, Imad al-Din Zengi. As part of this effort, they invested vast sums of money in building the fortress of Bethgibelin in 1134–36. The couple started associating their elder son, Baldwin, in their acts in 1138, but elected not to have him crowned. In 1139, Mu'in ad-Din Unur, ruler of Damascus, offered the town of Banias and a substantial payment to Fulk and Melisende in return for an alliance against Zengi, who had invaded Damascene territory. The king and queen accepted, seeking to safeguard their own interests in preventing Zengid expansion toward Jerusalem.

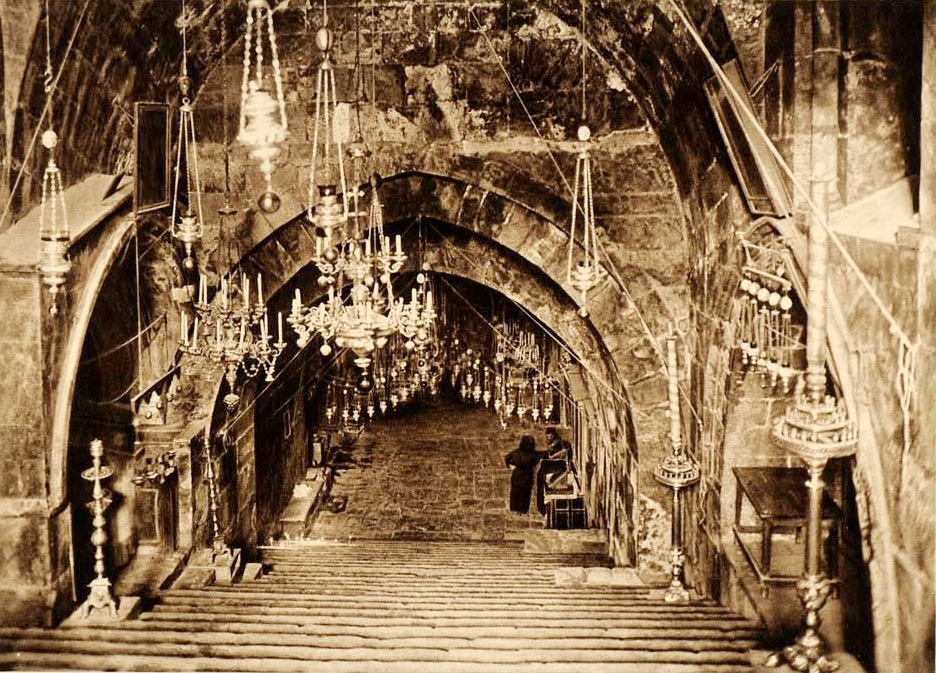
Melisende favored the Jehosaphat church. She and her mother were buried in the niches on the left and the right, respectively.

Melisende maintained a firm control over the church. From the late 1130s, she oversaw a further expansion of religious institutions, including the endowment of the Temple of the Lord with extensive land in Samaria, several grants of land to the Holy Sepulchre, and grants to the Abbey of Saint Mary of the Valley of Jehosaphat, the Order of the Hospital, the leper hospital of Saint Lazarus, and the Premonstratensians of the Church of Saint Samuel at Mountjoy. Melisende consistently supported the Syriac Orthodox Church. The Syriac Orthodox archbishop of Jerusalem, Ignatius III Jādida, appealed to Melisende after Fulk upheld the claim of a Frankish knight, Geoffrey of the Tower of David, to some of the church's land. According to the Syriac monk Michael, Melisende was "much saddened by the affair". She informed Fulk, who was at Bethgibelin, and let it be known that anyone who aided the archbishop would have her deepest gratitude. Fulk agreed to delay judgement until the case was heard in Melisende's presence. Thanks to her intercession, the Syriacs kept their land. She worked to improve relations with the Armenian Church as well; its leader, the catholicos Gregory III, attended a synod of the Latin Church in Jerusalem in 1140. The Greek Orthodox Monastery of Saint Sabas also received an endowment from Melisende. Her lavish gifts became legendary and earned her a reputation as a devoutly religious woman as well as the church's political support.

Fulk and Melisende's efforts to isolate Ascalon continued in the early 1140s. The couple erected two more fortresses, Ibelin in 1141 and Blanchegarde in 1142. They made no attempts to seize Ascalon itself.

=== Sole rule ===
==== Accession and consolidation ====
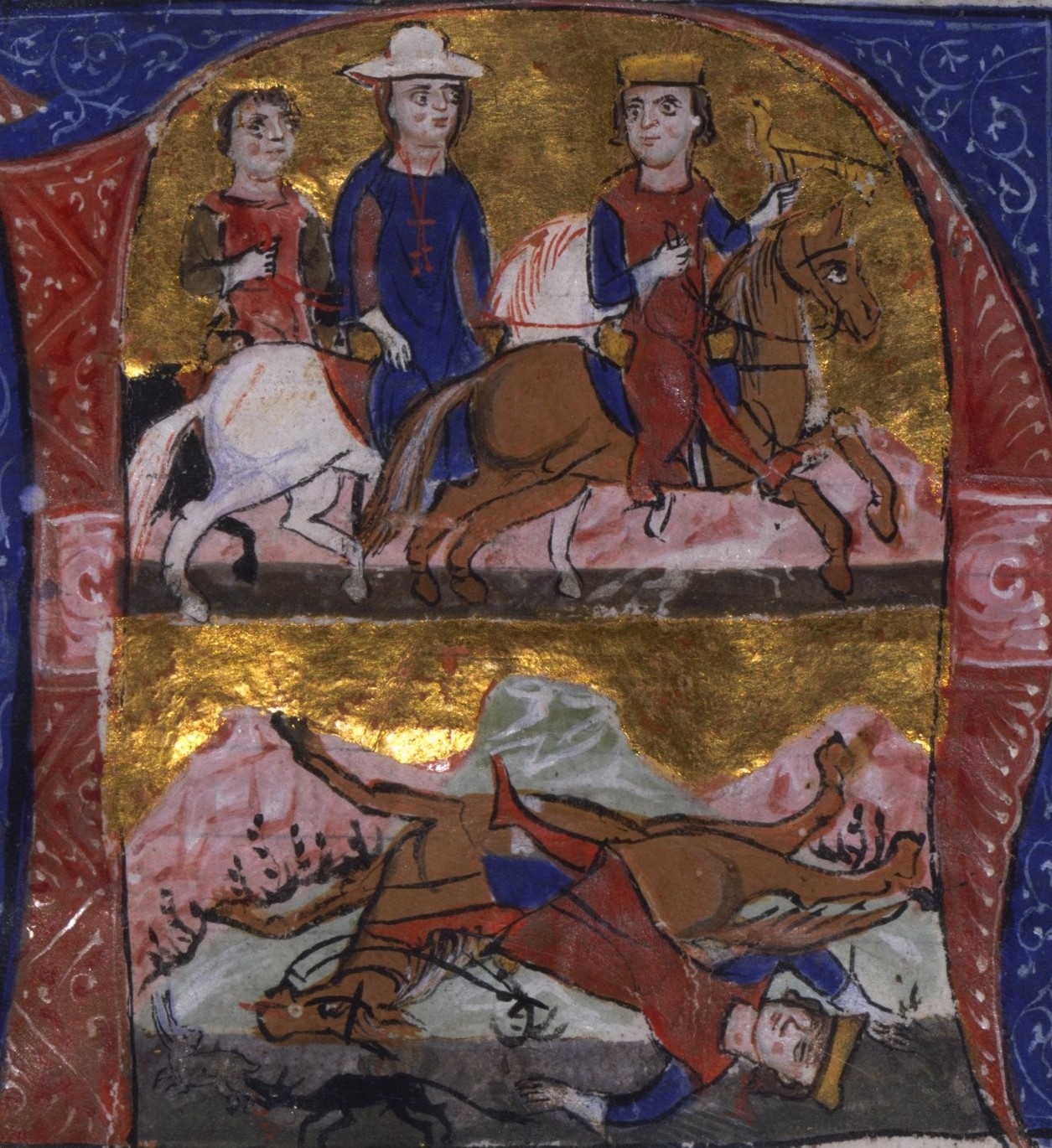
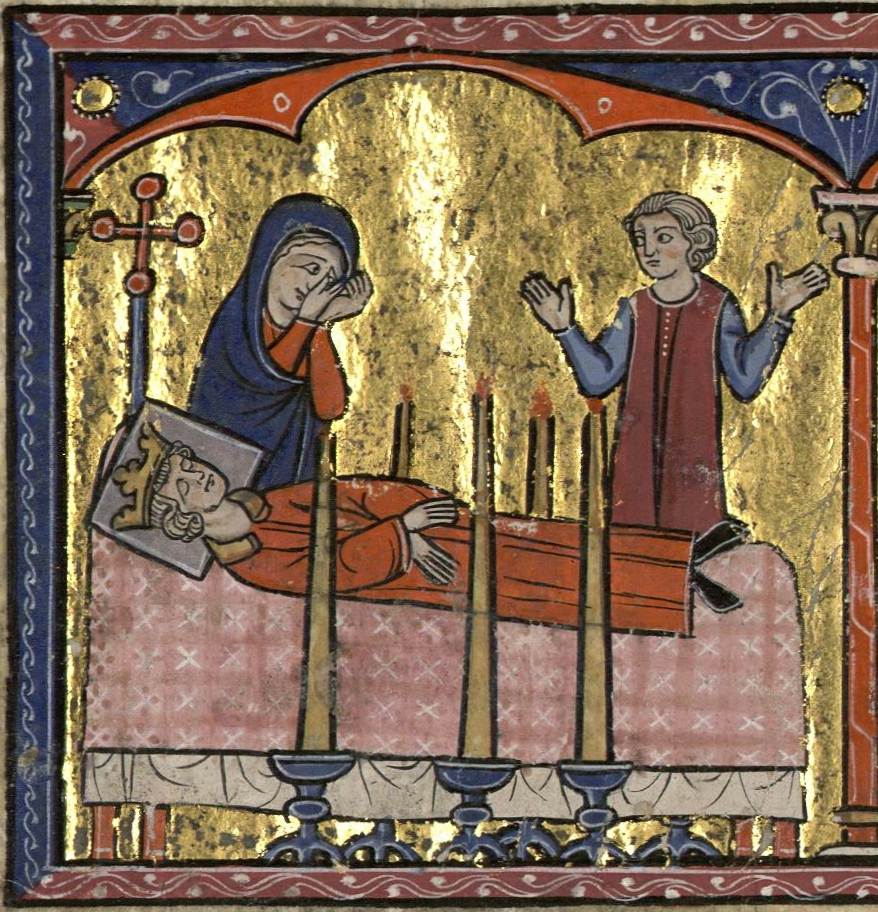
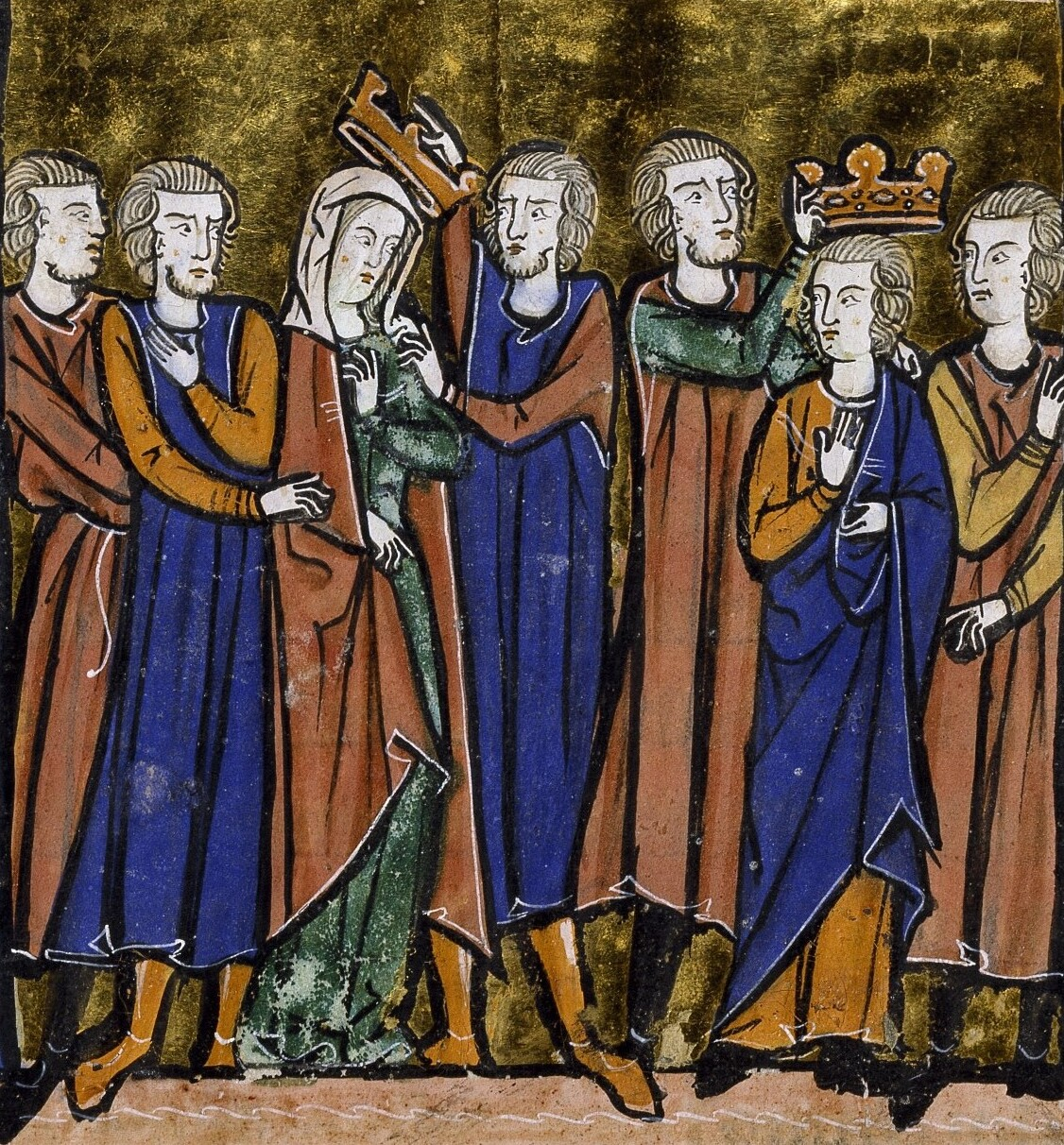
Fulk hunting with Melisende and being thrown from his horse (left), Melisende mourning Fulk (center), and Melisende's coronation with Baldwin III (right)

In late 1143, the court was at Acre, enjoying a period of peace. On 7 November, Melisende expressed a wish to have a picnic. While they were riding in the countryside, Fulk galloped off in pursuit of a hare. His horse stumbled and threw him off, and the heavy saddle struck him on the head. He was carried unconscious to Acre, where he died on 10 November. Melisende made a public demonstration of grief and then proceeded to take full charge of the government.

Melisende, who had been consecrated, anointed, and crowned in 1131, underwent a second coronation on Christmas 1143, this time together with Baldwin III, who was also consecrated and anointed on this occasion. The rites were performed by Patriarch William. All power was in Melisende's hands; Baldwin was 13 at the time and Melisende was his guardian. The queen is commonly said to have acted as her son's regent, but neither she nor the chronicler William of Tyre saw her rule as a regency. Citing William's statement that royal power came to Melisende through hereditary right, Hamilton concludes that she was "not a regent but the queen regnant". Baldwin started issuing charters in 1144 at the latest, when he issued one without reference to Melisende; thenceforth all were issued jointly by the mother and son, leading Mayer to believe that Melisende forbade that any charters be issued in her son's name only.

Melisende's first action as sole ruler was to appoint supporters to the kingdom's offices. As a woman, Melisende could not command the army. She appointed her first cousin Manasses of Hierges, who had recently arrived in the kingdom, to conduct military affairs in her name as constable. By choosing a cousin who was dependent on her patronage rather than giving such power to one of her subjects, Melisende ensured the preservation of royal authority. She may have been young enough to have more children, but two sons were sufficient and she opted not to remarry; Murray notes that in Manasses the queen had a "substitute husband" who could wield military authority on her behalf.

Besides Manasses, the queen's inner circle comprised the lord of Nablus, Philip of Milly; the prince of Galilee, Elinand of Tiberias; and the viscount, Rohard the Elder. Philip's family had been undermined early in Fulk's reign, and this may explain Philip's loyalty to Melisende. Elinand commanded more knights than any other lord in the kingdom. Rohard had incurred the queen's wrath in the early 1130s by supporting her husband's attempt to exclude her, but he was a key figure in the city of Jerusalem and, apparently, both were content to make peace. The support of Philip, Elinand, and Rohard enabled Melisende to maintain her position through the control of Jerusalem, Samaria, and Galilee, all of which contained significant parts of the royal domain.

==== Church management ====
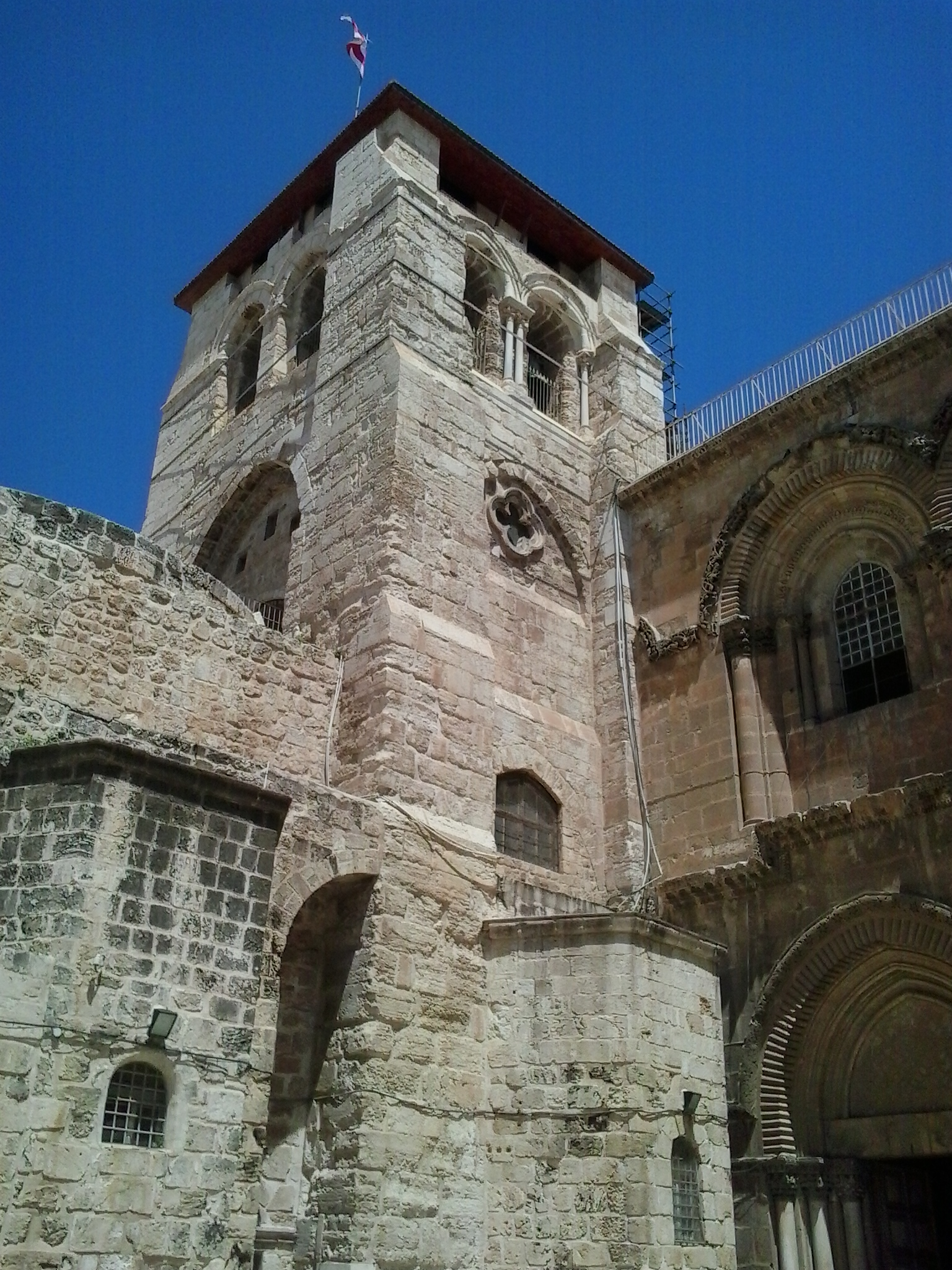
The Holy Sepulchre (12th-century bell tower pictured) saw a reconstruction under Melisende.

Melisende's patronage and strong personality led to a surge of architectural activity in Jerusalem. After she and Baldwin III were crowned, work started on enlarging the Church of the Holy Sepulchre. Folda argues that the project saw copious support from Queen Melisende and her cooperation with Patriarch William. The historian Nurith Kenaan-Kedar credits the Armenian characteristics of the Cathedral of Saint James in Jerusalem to the queen's support and influence.

Melisende received a letter of encouragement from the famed monk Bernard of Clairvaux in 1144 or 1145, but in his next letter to the queen Bernard mentioned hearing "certain evil reports" of her. The "evil reports" might be related to the claim of an anonymous Premonstratensian monk from France, who wrote in his continuation of Sigebert of Gembloux's chronicle that in 1148, Melisende had poisoned Count Alfonso Jordan of Toulouse and arranged for the capture of his son Bertrand by the Muslims. The monk wrote that the queen did this to ensure that Alfonso Jordan, a relative of the counts of Tripoli, would not threaten the possession of Tripoli by her brother-in-law Raymond and sister Hodierna. Melisende was on good terms with the Premonstratensians, however, and Barber attributes the monk's hostility to the "endemic misogyny of the monastic world".

While filling key offices with trusted men, Melisende turned her attention to the chancery: unwilling to retain her husband's confidant Elias as chancellor, she arranged for him to become bishop of Tiberias—a promotion he could not have refused. In 1145, Melisende appointed Ralph the Englishman, another newcomer, to succeed Elias as chancellor. In January 1146, the archbishop of Tyre, Fulcher of Angoulême, was elected to the patriarchate, succeeding William of Messines, who had died in September 1145. Melisende insisted that Ralph be appointed to the vacated see of Tyre. Barber holds that Fulcher must have risen to the patriarchate with Melisende's support, yet he led the opposition to her choice of Ralph. The conflict over the see of Tyre marked the only time Melisende was at odds with the church.

==== Holy war ====
Immediately after his coronation, Baldwin III sought to assert himself in warfare, the one field in which he had the advantage over his mother. In 1144, he quelled a revolt at Wadi Musa. Queen Melisende and her constable, Manasses, faced their first crisis in November that year when the atabeg of Mosul, Zengi, besieged Edessa. The Edessenes appealed to the young king for help, but it was Melisende who made the decisions. She called a council, and it was decided that Manasses, Philip, and Elinand should lead a relief force. Mayer believes that the young king was not sent because Melisende resented his success at Wadi Musa and did not wish to see her son gain a reputation as a military leader lest he become a threat to her political leadership. Barber, however, suggests that Melisende did not send Baldwin because she thought the gravity of the situation required experienced adults. The army did not reach Edessa in time: the city fell to the Turks, who spared its Armenian and Greek population, but "killed the Franks wherever they could", according to the chronicler Michael the Syrian. When word of Edessa's fall reached Jerusalem, Melisende sent to Antioch to consult with its leaders about dispatching an embassy to the pope to request a new crusade. Baldwin III came of age on his fifteenth birthday in early 1145, but the occasion was not publicly celebrated.

Zengi was assassinated in September 1146. Early next year, Altuntash, who had governed Bosra and Salkhad in the Hauran in the name of the Damascene ruler Unur, struck for independence. He came to Jerusalem and offered to deliver his towns to the Franks if they would establish him as lord in the Hauran. Melisende convened her council to consider the proposal. Though Damascus was their ally, the offer was appealing: the Hauran had a largely Christian population, and control of the region would place Damascus in a vulnerable position. Unur's army prevented Altuntash from returning to either Bosra or Salkhad. The Franks assembled an army at Tiberias, but also informed Unur that they intended to reinstall Altuntash. Unur objected, citing the queen's own feudal law against supporting rebellious vassals of friendly powers. He offered to repay her costs. Melisende sent a knight, Bernard Vacher, to inform Damascus that her army would escort Altuntash back to Bosra but would not attack Damascene territory. Bernard was persuaded by Unur that the expedition should be dropped. He convinced the young King Baldwin, and the council decided to abandon the plan. Agitators in the army, angered by the loss of a potentially profitable campaign, demanded that the expedition go forward. Baldwin gave in, only to be soundly defeated after Unur allied with Zengi's successor Nur al-Din. After this defeat, Melisende associated her younger son, Amalric, in the issuance of a charter, which undermined Baldwin's position.

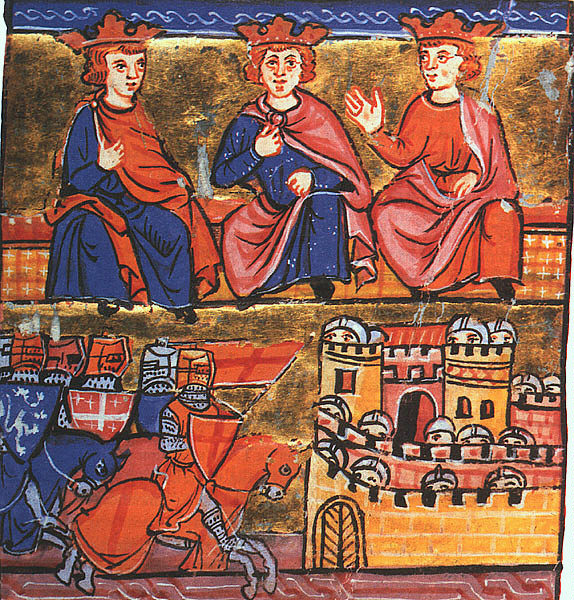
Three kings met at Acre (pictured above) to plan the siege of Damascus (pictured below).

The news of the fall of Edessa had shocked Europe, prompting Pope Eugene III to launch the Second Crusade. King Louis VII of France, Queen Eleanor, and King Conrad III of Germany travelled to the Levant with their relatives, vassals, and troops, accompanied by papal legates. They were met near Acre on 24 June 1148 by a contingent from Jerusalem consisting of Queen Melisende, King Baldwin, Patriarch Fulcher, the archbishops and the bishops, the masters of the Knights Hospitaller and Templar, and the leading noblemen; it was the most impressive gathering of dignitaries ever held in the Latin East. A decision to attack Damascus had already been reached in April by Baldwin, Conrad, and Fulcher in a much smaller meeting, which Melisende apparently did not attend. The ensuing siege of Damascus ended in a swift and humiliating defeat for the crusaders. Accounts of the Second Crusade make little mention of Melisende and historians disagree about her stance on the attack on Damascus.

In 1149, after the death of Prince Raymond in another disastrous defeat of the Christians by Nur al-Din, Baldwin hastened to assume responsibility for Antioch. At this point, Melisende further reduced his position: from 1149, she no longer issued charters jointly with him but merely allowed him to consent.

==== Rupture with Baldwin III ====
[Baldwin III's] features were comely and refined, his complexion florid, a proof of innate strength. In this respect he resembled his mother ... He was of somewhat full habit, although he could not be called fleshy like his brother or spare like his mother. — William of Tyre, A History of Deeds Done Beyond the Sea

The dispute with the church over the appointment of Melisende's chancellor, Ralph, to the see of Tyre reached its peak by 1149 and became a serious issue for the queen as a rift also grew between her and Baldwin. To retain the church as an ally, she either dismissed Ralph from the chancery or forced him to resign. She could not appoint a new chancellor without her co-ruler's consent, however, and the chancery thus collapsed. Mother and son henceforth employed separate scribes, which avoided an open break in their co-reign, but marked an unprecedented division of royal power.

The death of her trusted and most important vassal, Elinand, prince of Galilee, around 1149 was a setback for Melisende. After the capture of the count of Edessa by Zengid troops in 1150, Baldwin summoned the lords to march with him to Antioch, but those loyal to Melisende refused. This was, in Mayer's opinion, the queen's attempt to prevent Baldwin from achieving military success and fulfilling the traditional role of the kings of Jerusalem in protecting the northern crusader states. Baldwin proceeded, with only the small force he could muster.

From 1150, Melisende was apparently preparing for a showdown with Baldwin: she set up her own administrative machinery and gathered the lords loyal to her. In 1150, she procured for her cousin and constable, Manasses, the hand of Helvis of Ramla, widow of her supporter Barisan of Ibelin. This angered Barisan's sons, Hugh, Baldwin, and Balian, because it led to them losing land in Ramla. Baldwin, for his part, held Manasses responsible for his estrangement from his mother. Melisende further consolidated her position against Baldwin in 1151 when she made her younger son, Amalric, count of Jaffa. He became her most important partisan besides the church. The same year, the queen ordered the demolition of a mill at Jerusalem's Jaffa Gate to ease traffic congestion, and in 1152, hired Arabs from al-Bireh to rebuild the market and stalls along the Street of Bad Cooking. The Street of Herbs and the Covered Street may have been built at the same time. This was probably an attempt to win the support of the citizenry in addition to that of the nobles and clergy.

==== Civil war ====
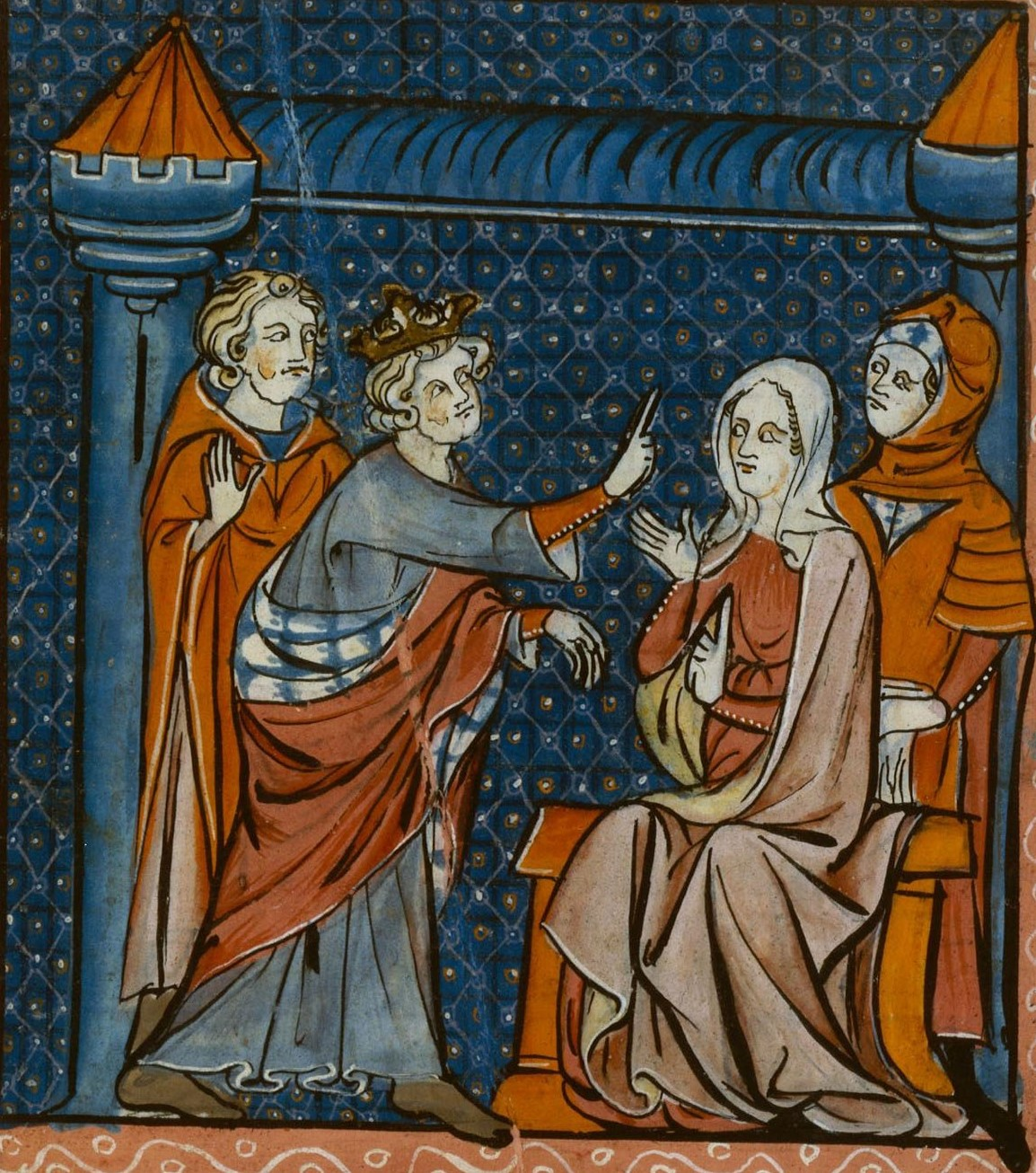
After being denied sole coronation, Melisende's son turned to armed conflict to challenge her.

Baldwin began to move against Melisende in early 1152. He demanded that the patriarch crown him on Easter Sunday without crowning her, which would signify that Baldwin would from then on be the sole ruler. Patriarch Fulcher refused, for the church supported Melisende. On Easter Monday Baldwin staged a solemn procession through Jerusalem, the seat of Melisende's power, wearing a laurel wreath instead of a crown. He then summoned the High Court and requested a division of the kingdom between him and his mother. For Hamilton, this request was "criminally irresponsible" because the kingdom was too small to survive a division; yet Mayer argues that Melisende had de facto divided the kingdom over the previous two years. At the meeting Melisende argued that the entire kingdom belonged to her by hereditary right, implying that Baldwin was the one usurping her right, but agreed to the division. The queen retained the regions of Judaea and Samaria while Baldwin held Acre and Tyre.

The division of the kingdom was short-lived. Baldwin declared that the land he had been allocated was insufficient to financially support him as king. Realizing her son's intentions, Melisende moved from the unfortified town of Nablus to Jerusalem. Baldwin defeated Manasses at Mirabel and exiled him, then swiftly occupied Nablus, and moved with his force onto Jerusalem.

Some of the lords in Melisende's portion deserted her; those who remained loyal until the end included her son Amalric, Philip of Milly, and Rohard the Elder. Upon hearing of her elder son's advance, Melisende withdrew with her household and followers to the Tower of David. Patriarch Fulcher at this point declared the church's full support for the queen. He marched out with his clergy to admonish the king, only to return enraged after Baldwin rebuffed him. The king set up camp outside the city, after which the citizens opened the gates to him. He then proceeded to bombard the Tower with siege engines, but could not make progress because the besieged defended themselves valiantly.

Despite being strongly fortified and well stocked, the Tower could not resist indefinitely, and so Melisende stood no chance of winning. After several days, a settlement was negotiated, possibly by clergy. Melisende might have been expected to retire to the convent of Bethany, but she held out for better terms, which saw her gain Nablus and adjacent lands for life along with her son's promise not to disturb her. Nablus would provide a substantial income but, being unfortified, could not be turned into a centre of military power. These terms suggest that, although she lost the war, Melisende retained powerful allies. Her subsequent conduct suggests that she agreed to abstain from politics, to rule Nablus not as queen but as any city lord would, and to act only with the king's consent. The eight-year-long struggle between mother and son was thus over by 20 April 1152. Melisende had exercised effective authority for sixteen years.

== Retirement ==
Retirement did not bring an end to Melisende's pursuits. Baldwin summoned a general assembly of the crusader states at Tripoli in mid-1152 intending to induce his widowed cousin Constance, princess of Antioch, to remarry and so relieve him of the responsibility for the principality. The attendees included the princess and her vassals and clergy as well as the count and countess of Tripoli. Though she was apparently neither summoned nor invited, Melisende also participated. Ostensibly she was there to help settle the marital problems of her sister Countess Hodierna and brother-in-law Count Raymond of Tripoli. Hamilton considers this a clever move because she could not be prevented from paying a visit to her sister, and once in Tripoli had to be invited to discuss her niece's marriage. Neither goal was achieved. The sisters set out for Jerusalem, and were escorted for a while by Hodierna's husband. As he was returning to Tripoli, he was killed by the Order of Assassins. The sisters returned to Tripoli for the funeral, after which Baldwin escorted Melisende home. Hodierna assumed rule over Tripoli as regent for her young son, Raymond III. Hamilton believes that from then on Baldwin's control over Antioch and Tripoli, ruled by Melisende's niece and sister respectively, depended on him treating his mother with respect.

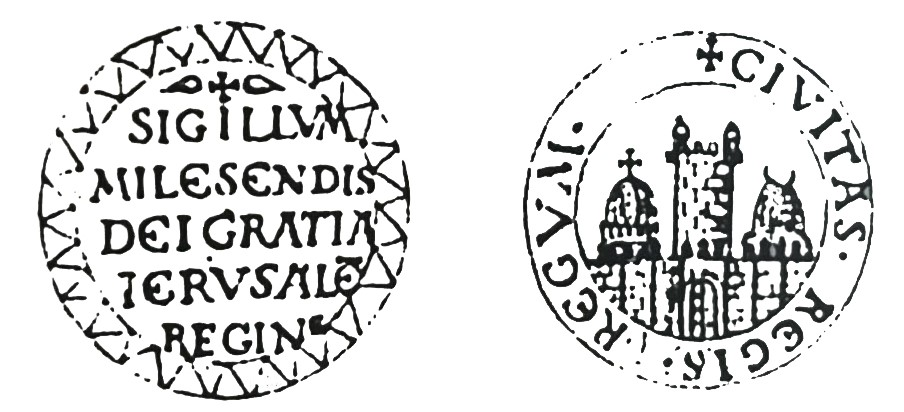
Melisende's 1159 seal identifies her as "by the grace of God queen of Jerusalem" and depicts Jerusalem.

In the aftermath of their conflict, Melisende made certain to mention Baldwin's consent in all her acts, and he honored her in return and allowed her to advise him. By sparing her further public humiliation, Baldwin avoided goading her into challenging him. In 1153, he conquered Ascalon, proving himself as a military leader, and made peace with Melisende. He distributed the lands around Ascalon following her advice. Beginning in 1154, Melisende was associated in her son's public acts and he confirmed the grants she had made during their estrangement. From 1156, the queen regained a measure of political influence, taking part in Baldwin's negotiation of a treaty with the Republic of Pisa in November. In 1157, she took a military initiative while the king was in Antioch. At her insistence the cave-fortress of el-Hablis, significant for controlling the territory of Gilead beyond the River Jordan, was attacked and recovered from the Muslims.

Melisende maintained her interest in the matters of religion and continued her patronage of the church as before her retirement. In 1157, Amalric married Agnes, daughter of the dispossessed Count Joscelin II of Edessa. Patriarch Fulcher protested that Amalric and Agnes were related within the prohibited degrees, but despite her piety, Melisende did not object. The same year, her stepdaughter Countess Sibylla of Flanders, Fulk's daughter from his first marriage, arrived in Jerusalem on a pilgrimage and entered the convent of Bethany. Fulcher died on 20 November, and though clergy assembled to elect his successor, Melisende intervened with Sibylla and Hodierna to secure the appointment of Amalric of Nesle as the next patriarch. The following year, Baldwin married too; his wife, Theodora Komnene, became the new queen. Hamilton speculates that Melisende's forceful character made her sons reluctant to allow their wives to take part in state affairs. In 1160, Queen Melisende joined Hodierna in commissioning luxurious jewelry, gold tiaras, and silver utensils for the dowry of Hodierna's daughter, Melisende of Tripoli; this example of Melisende's art patronage demonstrates the queen's continued activity and the Franks' resolve to impress her niece's betrothed, the Byzantine Emperor Manuel I Komnenos.

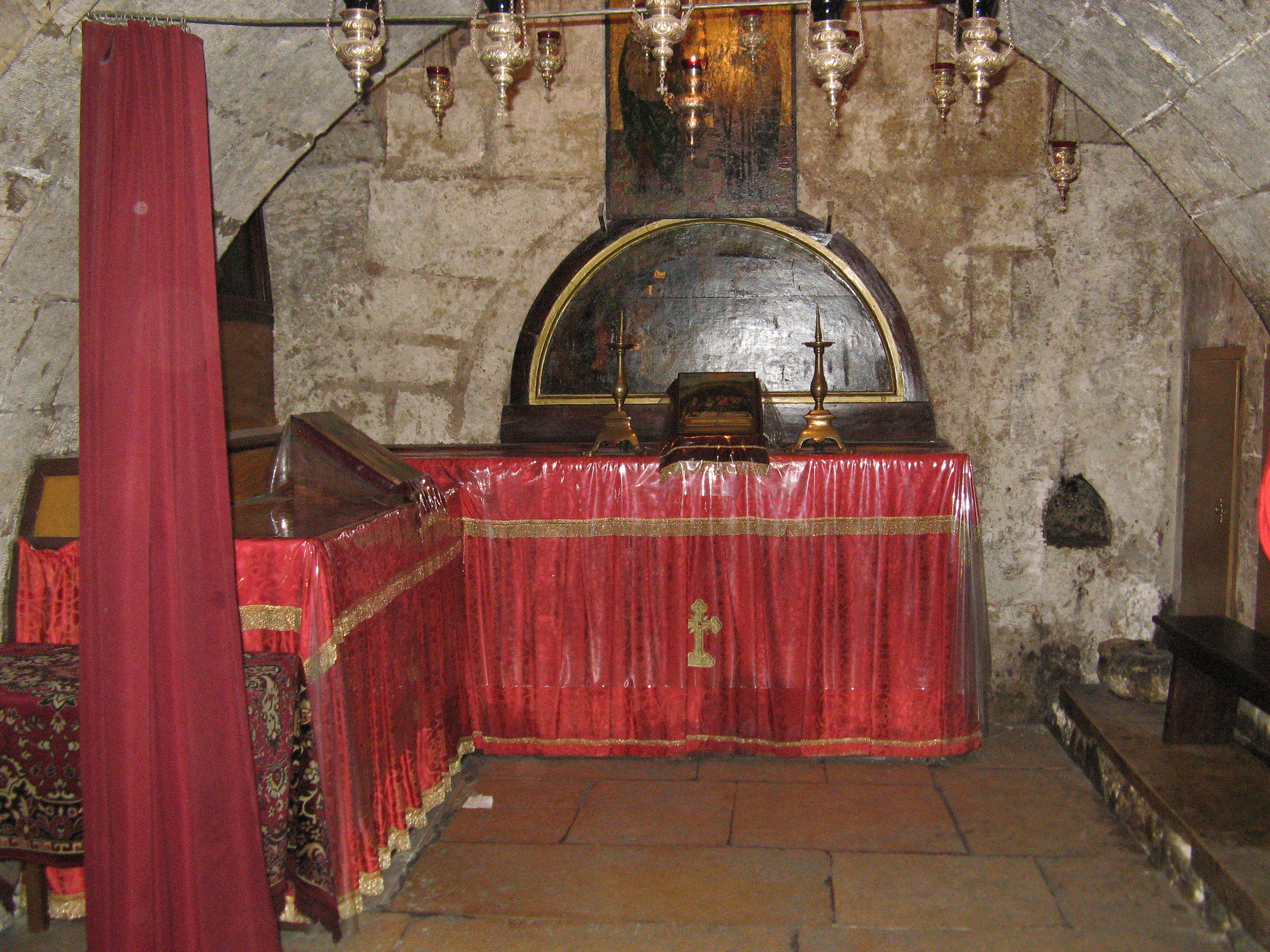
Melisende's commissions concluded with her tomb, which surpassed the tombs of the kings.

Queen Melisende's last public act was to assent with King Baldwin to Count Amalric's donation to the Holy Sepulchre on 30 November 1160. In 1161, she fell ill, with her memory impaired; she may have had a stroke. Hodierna and Ioveta nursed her for several months, permitting few people to see her. In the last weeks of her life, Baldwin moved into Nablus, acquiring the land Philip of Milly held there. This was in breach of his agreement with his mother, but she was by then unaware of the outside world. She died on 11 September 1161. She was probably in her early fifties. William of Tyre records that Baldwin was inconsolable; Mayer calls this "a fine public show of grief". Melisende was buried, like her mother, in the Abbey of Saint Mary of the Valley of Jehosaphat, which had always been dear to her. Folda considers her tomb to have been her last major commission in Jerusalem and "more magnificent than any king of Jerusalem ever received". In her last will and testament, she left property to, among others, the Orthodox Monastery of Saint Sabas. Baldwin barely outlived her, succumbing to an illness on 10 February 1163.

== Legacy ==
=== Assessment ===
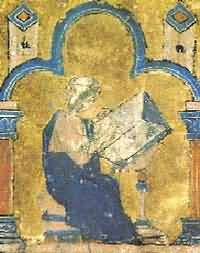
William of Tyre, depicted here writing his History, was deeply impressed by Melisende.

When recounting the conflict between Melisende and her son Baldwin III, William of Tyre takes the queen's side. Mayer explains that William was the court historian to King Amalric, the son who had sided with the queen and succeeded Baldwin III, and that William was influenced by Melisende's lavish grants to the church. William wrote:

She was a very wise woman, fully experienced in almost all spheres of state business, who had completely triumphed over the handicap of her sex so that she could take charge of important affairs.

Barber notes that while William's description of Melisende as "wise and judicious beyond what is normal for a woman" may sound patronizing to a modern reader, it is particularly significant because the archbishop did not normally approve of the involvement of women in public affairs.

Hamilton agrees with William's judgment that "striving to emulate the glory of the best princes... she ruled the kingdom with such ability that she was rightly considered to have equaled her predecessors in that regard". For Hamilton, Melisende was "a truly remarkable woman" because for decades she exercised power in a kingdom where no woman had previously had a public role. Barber observes that William's opinion was not universally shared and that two of the greatest disasters suffered by the Franks in the Levant took place during Melisende's reign, namely the fall of Edessa in 1144 and the failure to conquer Damascus in 1148, though he concedes that "the extent of her personal culpability for either of these events is arguable". Barber contrasts this with Baldwin III's conquest of Ascalon the year after she was deposed. Hamilton concludes that Melisende was both cultured and devout, while Folda calls her the greatest patron of art in the 12th-century Kingdom of Jerusalem.

According to Runciman, Melisende was "a capable woman who in happier times might have ruled with success". Mayer criticizes Melisende for not voluntarily abdicating in favor of Baldwin III, declaring that "her thirst for power was greater than her wisdom". He insists that "in spite of all the praise William of Tyre heaps on Melisende's abilities", her son was better suited to rule. Hamilton does not see why she should have felt the need to resign power to her "inexperienced" son, arguing that she was not a regent but the recognized co-ruler who governed well and enjoyed broad support. Mayer concludes that Melisende was "one of the most energetic among mediaeval queens". Although four female descendants followed her on the throne—Sibylla (r. 1186–1190), Isabella I (r. 1190–1205), Maria (r. 1205–1212), and Isabella II (r. 1212–1228)—Melisende remained the only queen of Jerusalem who reigned truly independently.

=== Art and memorialization ===
Melisende features prominently in the illuminated manuscripts of William of Tyre's Historia, which survives in 51 copies produced between the mid-13th and 15th centuries. The earliest to depict Melisende appear simultaneously in Acre and Western Europe about a century after her death. She is always shown together with a king–her father, her husband, or her son–usually subordinated but sometimes as the focus of the image. Most of the depictions in the Western manuscripts follow common iconographic types, such as her marriage, coronation, and mourning at a deathbed or a funeral. A notable exception are the illustrations of the hunt in which Fulk was fatally injured, some of which emphasize Melisende's importance. Although she is often depicted crowned, Melisende's portraits lack a consistent style and do not reflect her Armenian heritage or Byzantine influences, nor do they follow Western portrait conventions.

Melisende's historical importance was widely recognized in the thirteenth century, but she had become mostly overlooked by the nineteenth. She does not appear in Celestia Bloss' Heroines of the Crusades (1854), where it is the French queen Eleanor of Aquitaine who represents the Second Crusade. Scholarly interest in Melisende intensified in the twentieth century, but she remains largely absent from popular memory. The historian Danielle Park believes that Melisende is rarely referenced in popular culture because her legacy—marked by both her exceptional political authority rivaling that of her male crusader forebears and her controversial refusal to yield power to her son—resists simple categorization as either hero or villain.

Melisende appears in two works of historical fiction. In Emily Sarah Holt's Lady Sibyl's Choice (1879), Melisende predeceases Fulk and the fictional narrator laments her rights passing to Fulk's family. A strong-willed and independent Melisende is a much more significant character in Judith Tarr's Queen of Swords (1997), though she is not the novel's central protagonist. The synopsis for Kate Mosse's play The Queen of Jerusalem promises to celebrate "the extraordinary woman who ruled Jerusalem in the 12th century". Park argues that Melisende's appeal comes from her portrayal within a proto-feminist narrative that links her success in a male-dominated world to a universal female experience.

Regnal titles
| Preceded by Baldwin II | Queen of Jerusalem; 1131–1152 with Fulk (1131–1143); Baldwin III (1143–1152) | Succeeded by Baldwin III |
