= Perfumers' Market =

Souk in the old city of Jerusalem

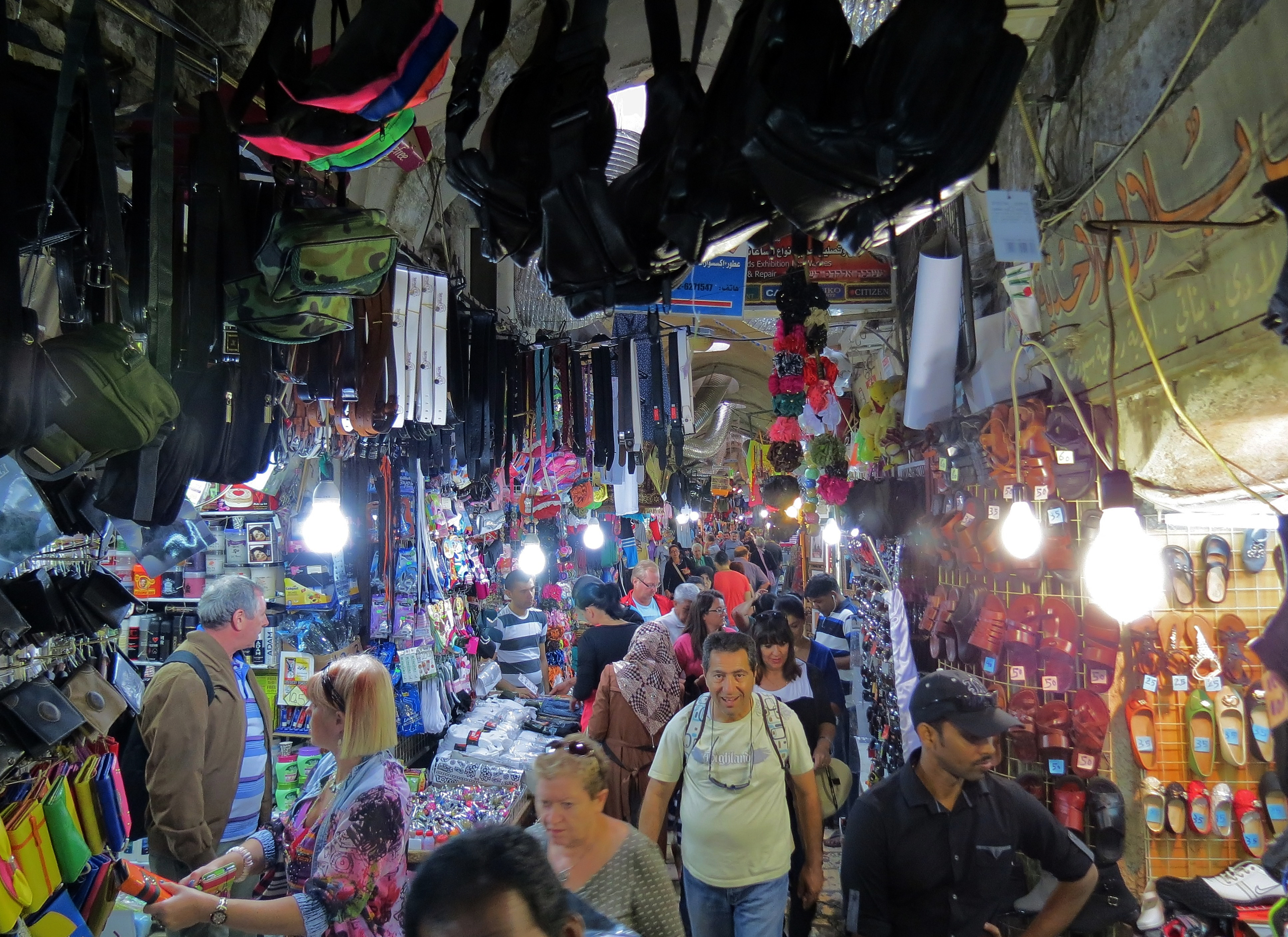
- The perfumers' market in 2013
- Native name: سوق العطارين (Arabic)
- Namesake: Perfumer shops
- Maintained by: Jerusalem Waqf
- Length: c. 150 metres (490 ft)
- Area: 8 dunams (8,000 m^{2})
- Location: Old City of Jerusalem
- Quarter: Muslim quarter
- North: Church of the Holy Sepulchre
- East: Al-Khawajat Market, Al-Aqsa (further)
- South: Suq al-Bazaar
- West: Butchers' market

The Perfumers' Market (Arabic: سوق العطارين, romanized: sūq al-ʻaṭṭārīn) is a souk found in the Old City of Jerusalem. It is dated back to the Crusader rule of Jerusalem. The name of the market derives from its historic use in the trade of perfumes, spices, aromatics, and folk medicine items.

== Name ==
The market is called sūq al-ʻaṭṭārīn in Arabic, the wordʻaṭṭār may be translated to English as "perfumer", "druggist", or "apothecary". Another common translation is "spice-dealers' market".

== Location ==
The market is situated in the middle of the "triple market", between the butchers' market and the khawajat markets of Jerusalem in the Muslim quarter, it starts where suq Khan az-Zait ends. On the other end, it connects with suq al-hasr. The market occupies an area of 8 dunams (8,000 m^{2}). There are 4 entrances to the market.

== Architecture ==
The markets corridor is covered by cross vaults, with openings in the centers of the vaults to allow sunlight in.

== History ==
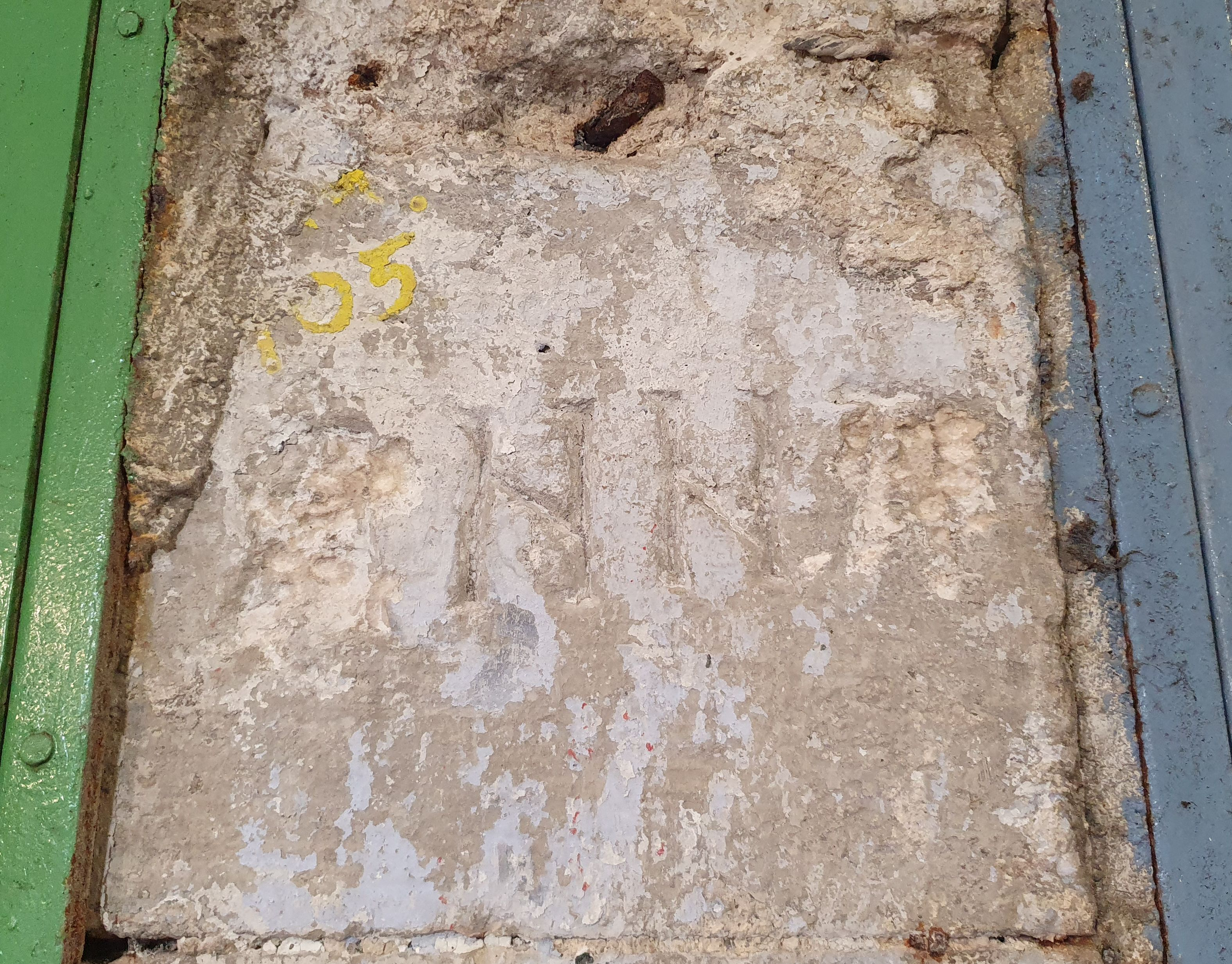
An inscription found in the market.

Archeological remains dating back the Roman and Byzantine periods were found underneath the market.

=== Crusader period ===
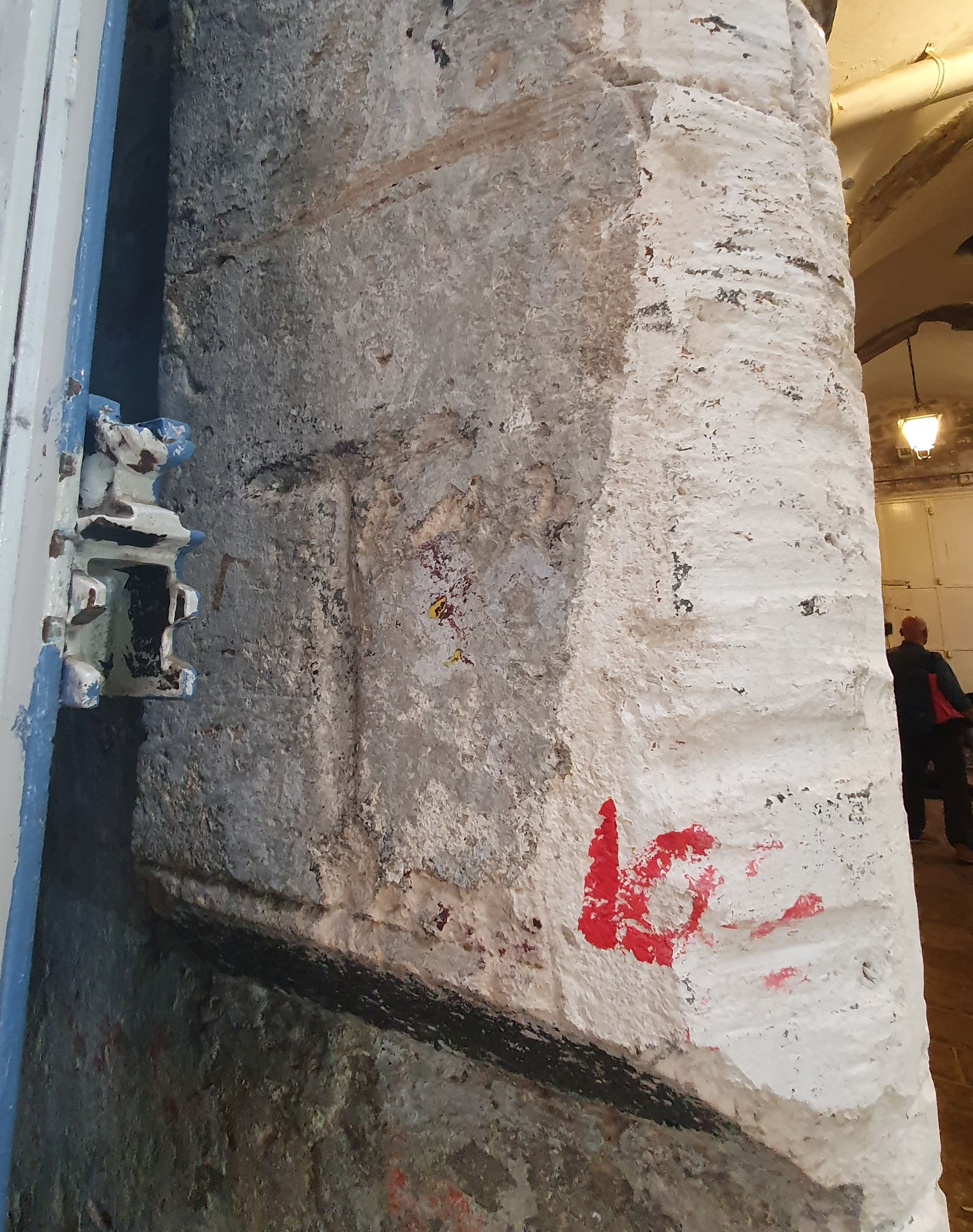
An inscribed "T" in the market. Probable Templar property mark.

During the Crusader period, the Perfumers' market was known as the Malquisinat. It was established in 1152 by Queen Melisende of Jerusalem. It was the middle of 3 street markets adjacent to one another, collectively called the "Triple Market", arranged east to west along the Cardo, Malquisinat translates to "bad cooking", or "evil cooking". Melisende employed Muslim laborers from Magna Mahomeria (now Al-Bireh) to construct the market. The Malquisinat market served ready-cooked meals, possibly to feed the pilgrims who visited the city and sought cooked food, the name was likely a reference to the food. The name may have carried on the 15th century, as chronicler Mujir al-Din referred to the market as Suq al-Tabbakhin, meaning "Cooks' Market". It also listed as suq al-tabbakhin in the waqfs.

The Malquisinat had opening shafts in the ceiling to allow in air and allow smoke from the cooking out, these openings were covered by stone arches or louvers to prevent rain from entering. Some of the shops in the market from that period are marked with the letter "T" in triangular shields, which have been attributed to the Templars, some inscriptions also had a "T" in a circle, which has been attributed to the Teutonic Order.

In 1188, a year after his siege of Jerusalem, Saladin set up a waqf to which the market has belonged. Gothic language inscriptions from the 12th century can be found in the market, spelling "SCA ANNA", which has been attributed to Scanta Anne of the Crusaders. The market contained shops that had likely belonged to the temporal estates of the Church of Saint Anne, the church would have received income from the shops. After the capture of the city and the establishment of the Salahiyya Madrasa in the former church complex, revenues from these shops were redirected to support the madrasa as part of its endowment income.

=== Ottoman period ===
During the 16th century, the perfumers market was intended by the Ottoman authorities to specialize in 1 trade, similar to other markets in the city, 7 such specialized markets were mentioned in Ottoman records from the year 1582. It was required by the regulations that all spices brought to Jerusalem are sold in the perfumers' market. Such regulations were sometimes ignored, for instance, it is recorded that a butcher did operate in the perfumers' market in the 16th century. In 1565, the market underwent large-scale renovations, including repairing old shops and building new ones, documents from the time refer to it as "The new spice-dealers' market". Some documents from 1565 differentiate between the old and new markets, but later documents indicate the distinction vanished as the markets were adjacent. According to historian Amnon Cohen, the waqf is documented to have rented out 17 shops in the perfumers' market in 1587, they were rented to 5 Muslims, 1 Christian, and 11 Jews, though Cohen notes that this may not necessarily reflect who worked the shops. Complaints to Ottoman courts about mistreatment of the spice dealers in the market by the Muhtasibs are also found in the 16th century court documents.

The market has been used to trade medicinal herbs during this period. During his visit to Jerusalem in the 19th century, Swiss doctor Titus Tobler took note of 67 different medicinal substances traded in one of the shops he visited in the market, calling it the "drug market" of Jerusalem. A 1920 issue of The Chemist and Druggist called the souk "market of the apothecaries", and commented on its trade of medicinal items.

=== Post-1967 ===
The market has been described as declining in economic activity during the 21st century by several news outlets. The Israeli annexation of East Jerusalem in 1967, as well as the construction of Israeli checkpoints, and the West Bank barrier have negatively affected the economy of the market by restricting the access of people from the West Bank to the market, as reported by Al Jazeera and The New Arab. Other reasons reported by The New Arab, Raya News and Emarat Al Youm include increased taxes, like the Arnona tax.

== Gallery ==
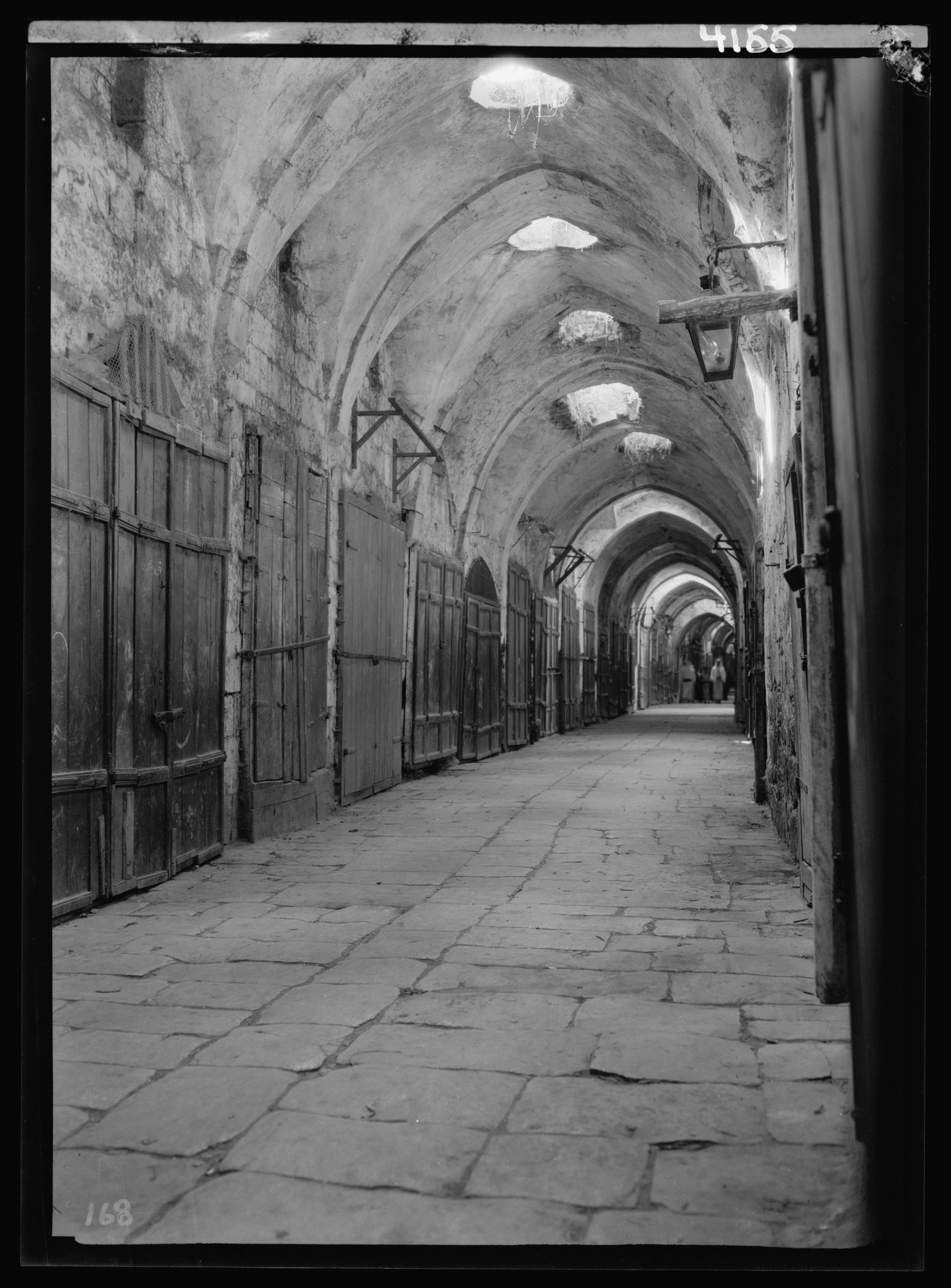
The market in 1929, closed during the 1929 Palestine riots, by Eric and Edith Matson.

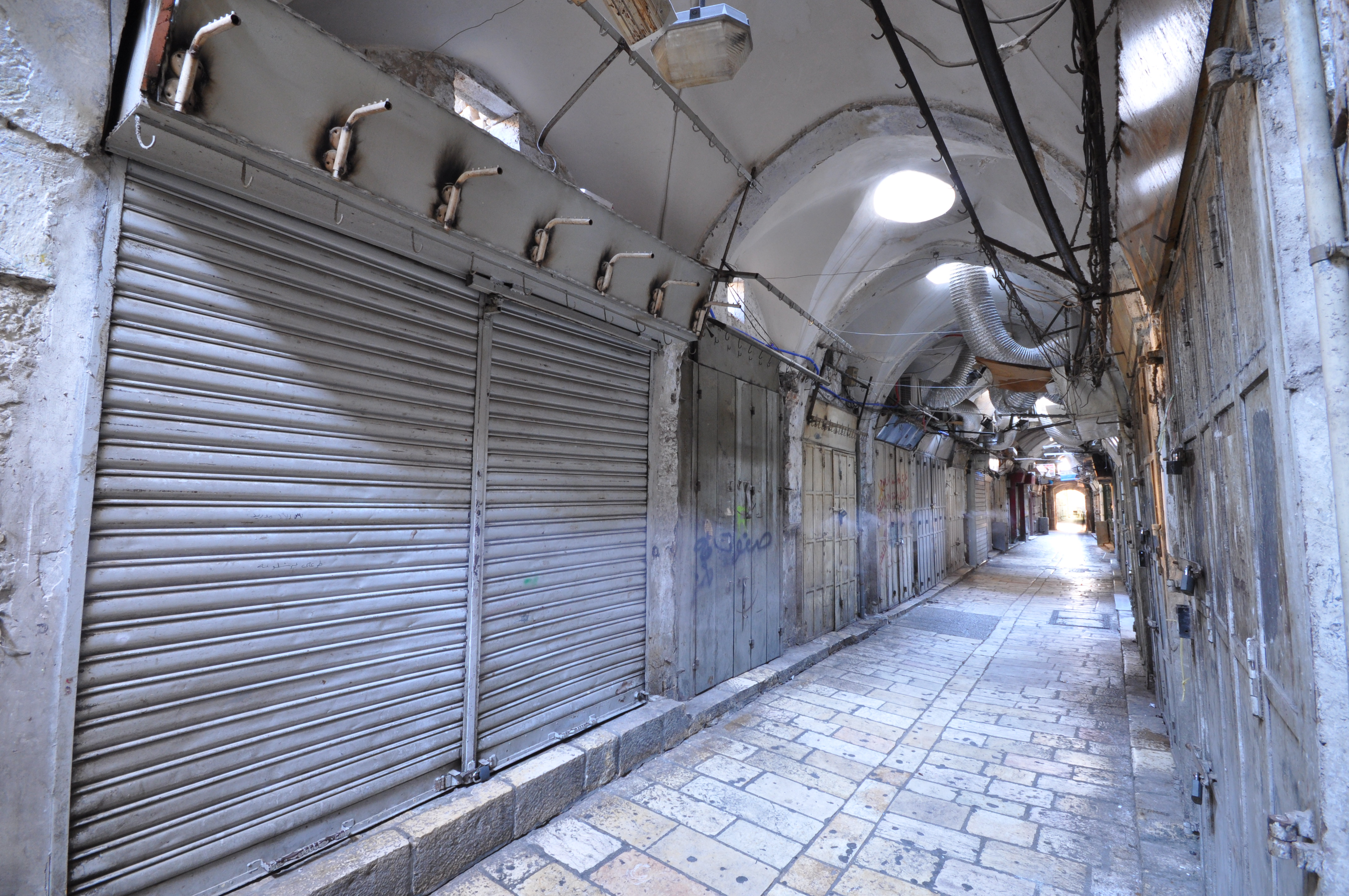
The market in 2012, while shops are closed.

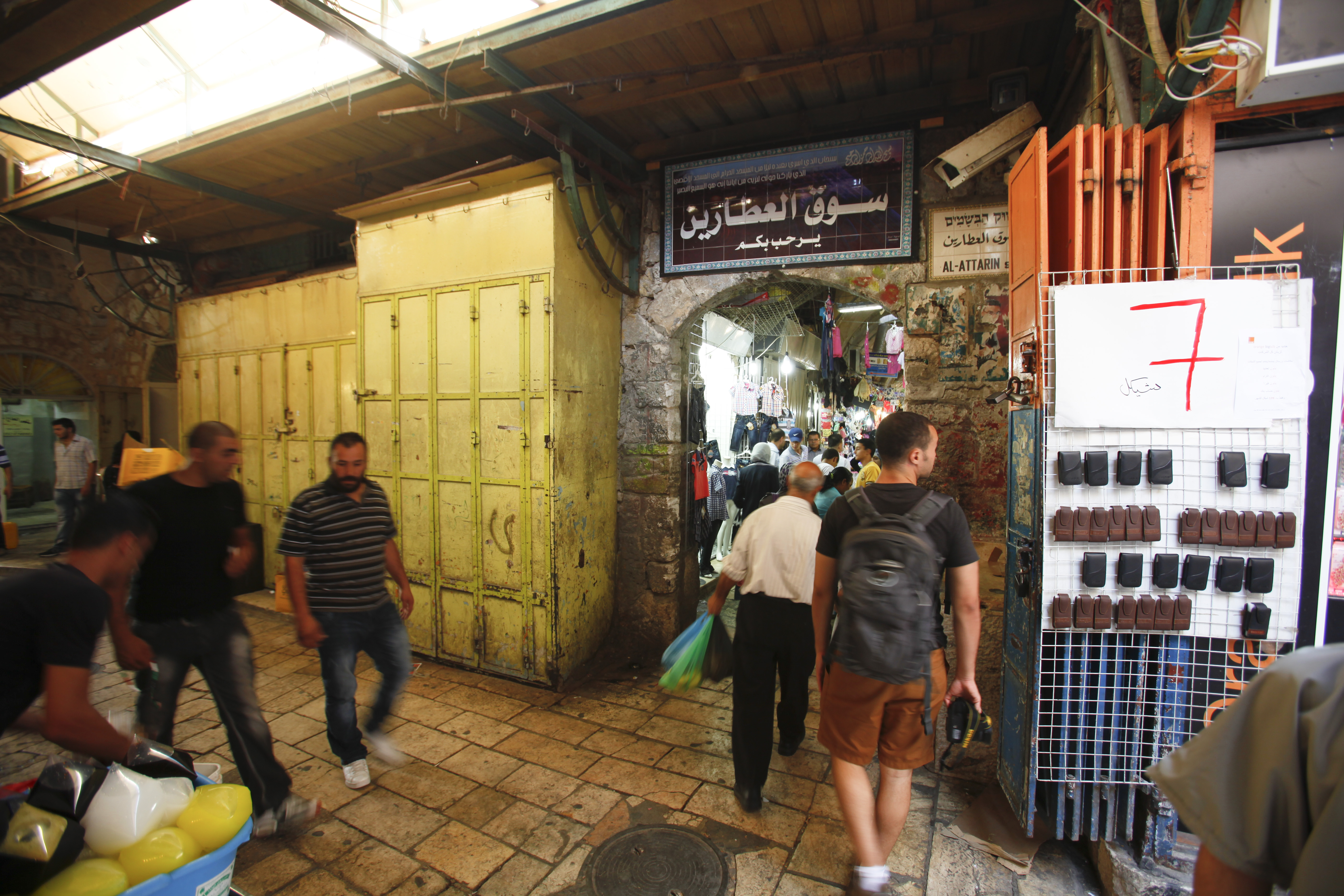
One of the entrances to the market, a trilingual sign is seen on the right

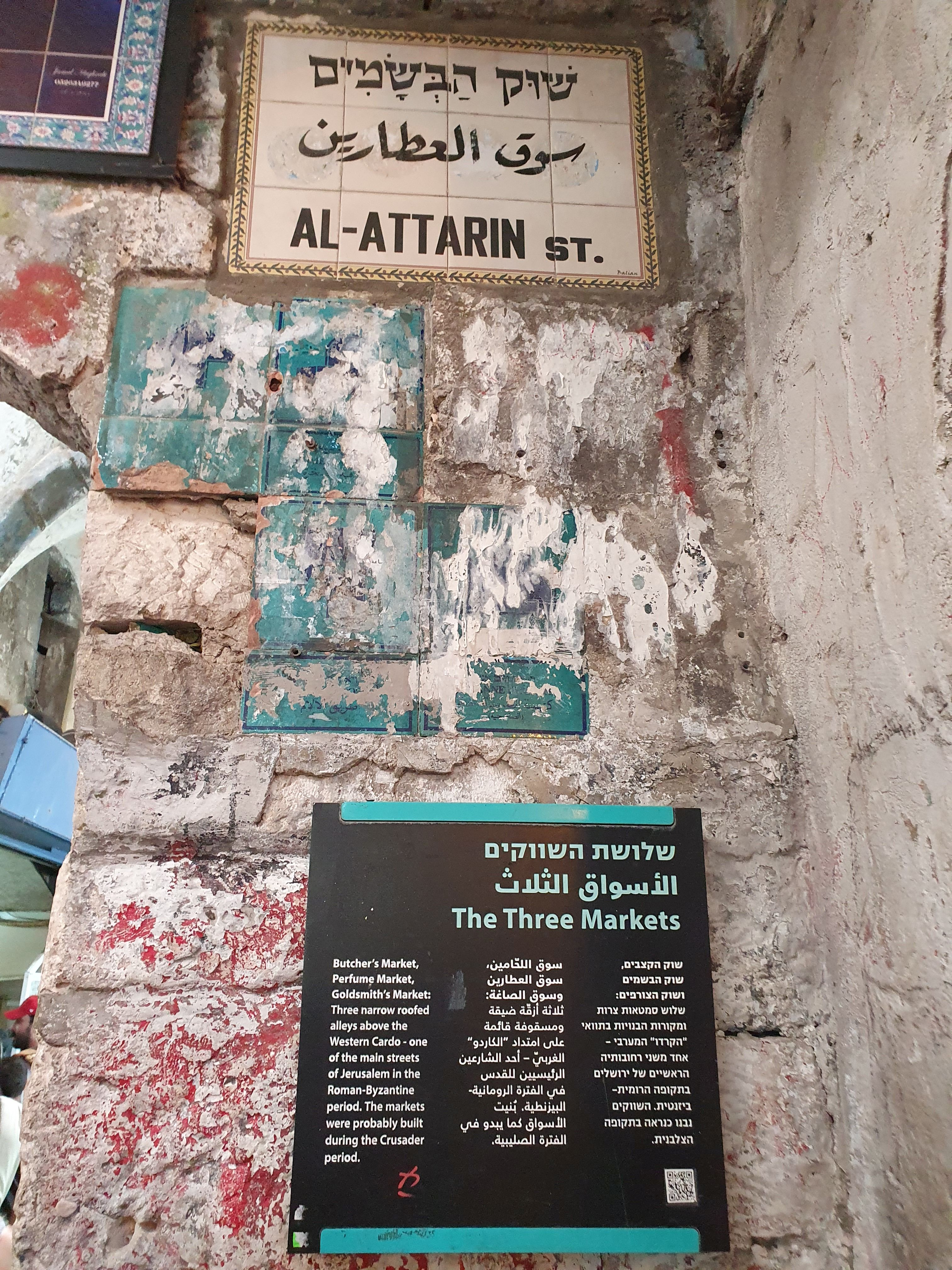
The trilingual sign at one of the markets entrances.

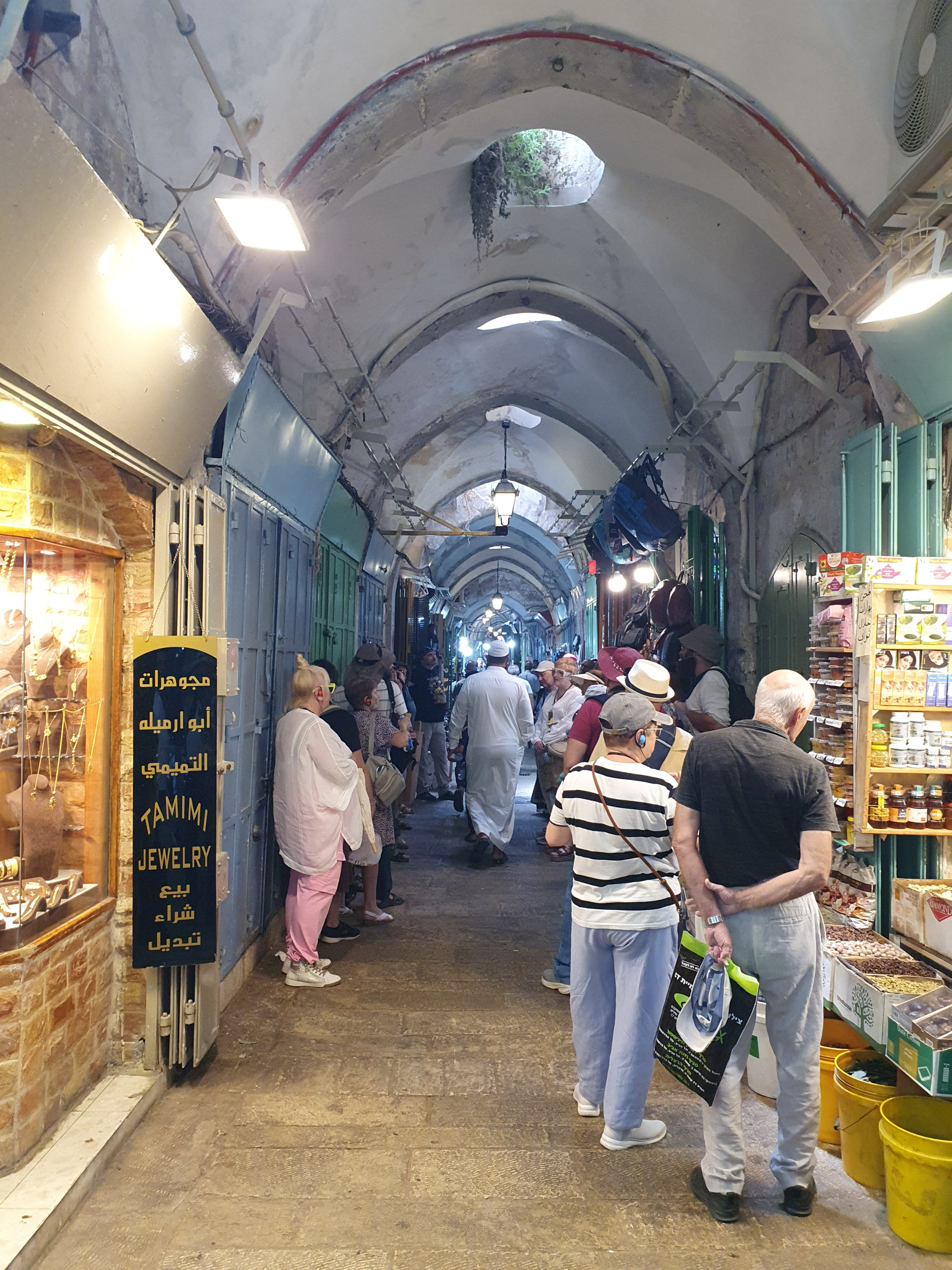
The market in 2024, a spice shop is seen on the right.
