= Alice of Antioch =

Princess of Antioch from 1126 to 1130

Alice

Princess consort of Antioch
- Tenure: 1126–1130
- Died: c. 1150
- Spouse: Bohemond II of Antioch
- Issue: Constance of Antioch
- House: House of Rethel
- Father: Baldwin II of Jerusalem
- Mother: Morphia of Melitene

Alice of Jerusalem (died c. 1150) was the princess of Antioch from 1126 to 1130 and, from 1130 to 1136, a contender for the regency of the principality. Because of her ambition to rule, she is unfavorably portrayed by the chronicler William of Tyre, who is the main narrative source of information about her life. William's hostile account has affected the historiographical assessment of Alice's career.

Alice was the daughter of King Baldwin II of Jerusalem, who assumed rule over the Principality of Antioch during the minority and absence of Prince Bohemond II. Bohemond arrived to take up his inheritance in 1126 and was immediately married to Alice. They had a daughter, Constance. After Bohemond's death in battle in 1130, Alice attempted to seize power either as regent for Constance or as sovereign princess. She was opposed first by her father, who died in 1131, and then by her brother-in-law King Fulk of Jerusalem. In late 1135, she assumed power in Constance's name, but was permanently displaced early the next year by Raymond of Poitiers, who had come from Europe to marry her daughter. Throughout her widowhood, she retained rule over the coastal cities of Latakia and Jabala, which she had received from Bohemond as dower, and there developed an autonomous lordship.

== Early life ==
The Levant between the First and the Second Crusade

Alice was the second of four daughters of Baldwin of Bourcq, a Frankish nobleman, and Morphia of Melitene, an Armenian noblewoman. Like her elder sister, Melisende, and younger sister, Hodierna, Alice was born when Baldwin was still the count of Edessa. The County of Edessa was–like the Kingdom of Jerusalem, the Principality of Antioch, and the County of Tripoli–one of the four crusader states of the Levant created by the Franks, the Latin Christians who invaded the region and defeated its Muslim rulers in the First Crusade in 1098-99. Alice's father was elected king of Jerusalem in 1118. In 1119 he returned to Edessa to install his cousin Joscelin of Courtenay as the new count and to bring his wife and their daughters to Jerusalem. Alice subsequently gained another sister, Ioveta.

Roger of Salerno, prince of Antioch, was killed and the Frankish army of Antioch annihilated by the Turk army of Ilghazi in the Battle of the Field of Blood on 28 June 1119. King Baldwin arrived in Antioch probably in late July and asserted his authority over the principality. It was agreed that he would rule during the minority of the rightful heir, the c. 9-year-old Bohemond II, who would marry the king's second daughter, Alice, upon coming of age. Bohemond at the time lived in Apulia.

Bohemond arrived to the Levant in late 1126. Baldwin awaited him at Antioch with Alice. The couple were quickly married, and Bohemond then assumed rule over the principality. Baldwin was thus relieved of the responsibility for the principality while maintaining an alliance with Antioch. Historian Thomas Asbridge sees Alice as a prestigious match for Bohemond because of her father's successful career. Similarly to the earlier princesses of Antioch, Cecilia of France and Alice's aunt Cecilia of Le Bourcq, Alice received a generous dower. Hers consisted of the coastal cities of Latakia and Jabala. She gained no significant role in the principality, however. Her marriage produced one child, a daughter named Constance. Because King Baldwin had no sons, the Jerusalemite succession was settled on his eldest daughter, Melisende, who was then married to Count Fulk V of Anjou.

== Rule ==
=== First bid for power ===
Bohemond was killed in fighting in Cilicia in February 1130. He had been a promising ruler, and the first clearly legitimate prince in Antioch since c. 1105. Asbridge believes that his death must have been a shattering blow to the Franks of Antioch. They decided to send for Alice's father, King Baldwin, to come and take control, but Alice acted first and seized control of the city. Archbishop William of Tyre, the Jerusalemite chronicler who wrote long after these events, records that Alice intended to claim the principality for herself "in perpetuity", dispossessing her infant daughter, Constance. Rumors spread in Antioch that Alice planned to send Constance to a convent or to have her marry a commoner. Asbridge, however, says that it is not clear whether Alice wished to divert the succession from Constance or to rule as regent, as was usual for the mother of a child ruler. Asbridge argues that Alice's success in seizing power proves that William cannot be correct in claiming that she had no major supporters.

Upon receiving the news of Bohemond's death, King Baldwin hastened to Antioch with his son-in-law Fulk to take custody of Constance and appoint a regent. Alice, William says, attempted to ally herself with the Muslim ruler of Mosul and Aleppo, Imad ad-Din Zengi, but her messenger was captured and killed by her father's men. This account is widely accepted in traditional historiography, but Asbridge is suspicious because it is not confirmed in either Christian or Muslim contemporary sources. When her father appeared at the gates of Antioch, Alice ordered them shut, and garnered support by distributing money from the princely treasury. Historian Steven Runciman speculates that her Armenian heritage may have endeared her to the city's native Christians.

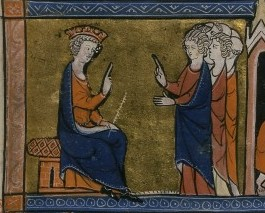
King Baldwin II forgave Alice, but gave the guardianship of her daughter to another.

Encamped outside the city, Baldwin sent for Joscelin of Edessa. After a few days, a monk named Peter Latinator and a knight called William of Aversa opened the gates to Fulk and Joscelin, allowing the king to enter. Alice took refuge in a tower and only emerged after city officials guaranteed her life. She knelt before her father, who forgave her but removed her from power. Baldwin had the Antiochene nobles swear fealty to himself and Constance, and then gave the guardianship of the principality and its heir to Joscelin. Joscelin was to rule the principality until a marriage could be arranged for Constance. Alice retained Latakia and Jabala, leaving her extremely powerful because those cities were the main ports of the northern Levant.

=== Regency of Fulk ===
King Baldwin fell seriously ill upon his return from Antioch to Jerusalem. He died on 21 August 1131, and was succeeded by Fulk and Melisende. Joscelin died within weeks of Baldwin, and was succeeded as count of Edessa by Joscelin II. Alice saw an opportunity to make her second bid for power. She allied with Counts Joscelin II of Edessa and Pons of Tripoli, neither of whom wished to accept Fulk's suzerainty, and also had the support of a major Antiochene baron, William of Saone. An embassy of concerned Antiochene nobles informed Fulk of the plot. In mid-1132 he defeated Pons, ending Alice's hopes of assuming power. Fulk was not strong enough to punish the rebels nor to break up Alice's party. The king stayed in Antioch for some time, and left Rainald I Masoir as regent. He returned again in late 1133 or early 1134. In concert with the Antiochene nobles he sent an offer to Raymond of Poitiers, a younger son of Duke William IX of Aquitaine, to come from France to become the new prince of Antioch. The invitation to Raymond was kept secret to prevent a counter strike by either Alice or King Roger II of Sicily, who was Constance's closest relative on her father's side and may have had his own designs on the principality.

Alice remained active throughout the 1130s. By 1134 at the latest she had started developing an independent government at Latakia and issuing charters through her own scriptorium as "Alice, second daughter of Baldwin king of Jerusalem, once wife of Lord Bohemond, son of Bohemond the Great, most excellent prince of Antioch, by the grace of God princess of Antioch". She had her own chancellor, constable, and possibly other officers. Asbridge maintains that she saw herself as an "absentee princess or regent", while his colleague Malcolm Barber believes that Rainald Masoir needed Alice's co-operation to govern the principality effectively. Her court became the center of opposition to Fulk's rule in the crusader states. In 1134 she hosted Hugh II of Jaffa, who in the same year led a major revolt against Fulk.

Bernard of Valence, the first Latin patriarch of Antioch, died in late 1135 and was succeeded by Ralph of Domfront. Ralph's elevation may have been supported by Masoir in an attempt to counter Alice's party. Towards the end of 1135 Alice marched to Antioch and again assumed power. Melisende interceded with Fulk not to interfere. Alice had the support of the new patriarch, and is not recorded to have encountered resistance from Masoir. According to Byzantine chronicler John Kinnamos, the "principal personages" of Antioch sent an embassy to Byzantine Emperor John II Komnenos, proposing a marriage between his youngest son, Manuel, and Alice's daughter, Constance. The traditional version of events is that it was Alice who contacted the Byzantines, seeking a marriage either for herself or for Constance in order to maintain her influence. Asbridge and historian Andrew D. Buck suggest that this offer may have been made already in 1130 and not by Alice.

=== Reign of Raymond ===
Raymond of Poitiers arrived in early 1136. William of Tyre narrates that Ralph convinced Alice that Raymond had arrived to become her husband only to celebrate Raymond's marriage to Constance instead. Buck considers it more likely that Alice came to Antioch to protect her daughter, then aged only eight, from an uncanonical marriage. Alice was thus outmanoeuvred; she retired to her own domain and, in William's words, "ever after she pursued the prince with relentless hatred". According to William, Raymond and Ralph further agreed that if Raymond's brother Henry came to Antioch, the archbishop would marry him to Alice, thus securing Latakia and Jabala.

Asbridge considers it "extremely unlikely" that Alice did not know that Raymond had come to marry Constance or that the marriage could be held without her knowledge; he suggests that only the speed with which it took place may have caught her by surprise. Ralph is traditionally said to have feared that a Greek patriarch would be imposed in case the alliance with the Byzantines materialized, but Asbridge argues that Ralph decided to support Raymond and Constance because Raymond had promised to swear fealty to him, something Alice would presumably not consider. Alice stood no chance to win support against an adult man of high birth with a clear legal claim to rule, and the Antiochene turned their back on her permanently.

Back in Latakia and Jabala, Alice's agency continued. She relinquished the title of princess of Antioch, recognized Raymond as prince, and retained links to the princely court. In an 1151 charter, Constance described her mother as princess of Latakia. Alice appears to have pursued an independent military policy in this period: Bishop Hugh of Jabala visited the papal court in Rome in 1145 to report the fall of Edessa to Zengi, and took the opportunity to complain that Alice was refusing to share the spoils of her raids with the Church. Like her aunt Cecilia and daughter, Constance, Alice had ties to the Abbey of Saint Mary of the Valley of Jehosaphat, where the princesses of Antioch were buried. She died c. 1150, having ruled her own lordship of Latakia and Jabala for nearly 20 years. Latakia and Jabala passed to her daughter, who ruled the principality on her own from 1149 to 1153.

== Assessment ==
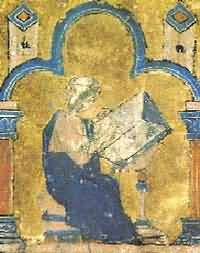
William of Tyre, depicted here writing his History, had a low opinion of Alice.

Archbishop William of Tyre, the principal chronicler of the 12th-century Levant, portrays Alice in an unmistakably unfavorable light. He generally did not appreciate female participation in state affairs, and for him Alice was a "wicked" and "tyrannical", "extremely malicious and wily woman". He faulted her for bribing men to support her, seeking an alliance with Muslims, and wanting to choose her own husband. Because he is the most comprehensive, if not sole, narrative source for the history of Antioch in the 1130s, his opinion of Alice has profoundly influenced 20th-century historians' assessment of the princess. Hans E. Mayer, for example, described her attempts to seize power as "disgraceful".

Asbridge concludes that, as the holder of a vast lordship, Princess Alice was "one of the most powerful figures in the principality's history". He concedes that her struggle for power "to some extent exacerbated" the weakness of Antioch in the 1130s, leading to significant territorial losses, but argues that such an ambition in a man would be seen "as nothing more than a natural impulse". He compares Alice to her elder sister, Queen Melisende, suggesting that Alice may have been a "precursor or exemplar" to Melisende in the latter's struggle against her husband, King Fulk, and son, King Baldwin III, for power in Jerusalem. William of Tyre writes highly favorably about Melisende and her achievements, however, and Asbridge argues that this contrasting treatment has obscured the similarities between the sisters.

== Bibliography ==
- Asbridge, Thomas (2003). "Alice of Antioch: a case study of female power in the twelfth century". In Peter W. Edbury; Jonathan P.Phillips (eds.). The Experience of Crusading. Vol. 2: Defining the Crusader Kingdom. Cambridge University Press. pp. 29–47. ISBN 9780521781510.
- Barber, Malcolm (2012). The Crusader States. Yale University Press. ISBN 978-0300189315.
- Buck, Andrew D. (2017). The Principality of Antioch and its Frontiers in the Twelfth Century. The Boydell Press. ISBN 978-1-78327-173-3.
- Buck, Andrew D. (2020). "Women in the principality of Antioch: power, status, and social agency". Haskins Society Journal. 31: 95–132. ISSN 0963-4959.
- Mayer, Hans E. (1972). The Crusades. Oxford University Press. ISBN 0241298768.
- Runciman, Steven (1952). A History of the Crusades: The Kingdom of Jerusalem and the Frankish East, 1100-1187. Vol. 2. Cambridge University Press. ISBN 0241298768.
