= Morphia of Melitene =

Queen of Jerusalem from 1118 to 1127

Queen consort of Jerusalem
- Tenure: 1118 – c. 1127
- Coronation: 25 December 1119
- Died: 1 October c. 1127
- Spouse: Baldwin II, King of Jerusalem
- Issue: Melisende, Queen of Jerusalem; Alice, Princess of Antioch; Hodierna, Countess of Tripoli; Ioveta, Abbess of Bethany
- Father: Gabriel, Lord of Melitene

Morphia of Melitene (died 1 October c. 1127) was queen consort of the Kingdom of Jerusalem from 1118 until her death. She was an Armenian by ethnicity and a Melkite Greek Orthodox Christian. Her father, Gabriel, was a warlord in northern Syria. He wished to marry her off to one of the crusader leaders who were carving out states in the Levant, and eventually chose Count Baldwin II of Edessa. They married around 1100 and had four daughters: Melisende, Alice, Hodierna, and Ioveta. In 1118, Baldwin was elected king of Jerusalem; the next year, Morphia became the first woman to be crowned as the queen of Jerusalem. She did not participate in the government but took initiative to liberate her husband after he was captured in 1123. She died a few years later. According to historian Bernard Hamilton, her religious practices left a lasting mark on the status of Orthodox Christians in the crusader kingdom.

== Background ==
Morphia was the daughter of Gabriel, an Armenian prince who ruled the city of Melitene (Malatya) in the northern Syria region. While a vast majority of Armenians adhered to the Oriental Orthodox Armenian Church, Gabriel and his family were Melkites who practiced the Greek Orthodox faith. Morphia's name was of Greek origin, Eumorphia in full, and the Anonymous Syriac Chronicle refers to her using the Greek title kyria ("lady"). Northern Syria was a strategic area for the crusaders, Catholics from Western Europe who established crusader states in the Levant in the late 11th and early 12th century. Key leaders of these settlers, called Latins or Franks, sought to marry into Armenian nobility, the region's indigenous Christians who occupied frontier cities between the encroaching Byzantine and Seljuk empires.

Melitene and the County of Edessa from 1098 to 1131

Gabriel wished to ally himself with Bohemond I of Taranto, a crusader who had established the Principality of Antioch in 1098. In 1100 Gabriel offered Morphia's hand in marriage to Bohemond as well as the city of Melitene, either completely or to be held in vassalage to Bohemond. As Bohemond rushed to defend Melitene from the Seljuk Turks, he was captured, and the intended match failed. Instead, it was another crusade leader, Baldwin of Bourcq, who arrived to aid Gabriel and whom Morphia married.

== Marriage ==
Morphia married Count Baldwin II of Edessa some time between the capture of Bohemond I of Antioch in August 1100 and Bohemond's release in May 1103. The historian Bernard Hamilton believes that their union was celebrated before the crusade of 1101, probably in 1100. Alan V. Murray holds that the period between March 1101 and August 1102 is more likely. The alliance with Morphia's father was valuable to Baldwin, who had just acquired the nearby County of Edessa, another newly established crusader polity. Morphia's dowry, said to have been enormous, would have been just as attractive. In 1103 the Turks conquered Melitene and killed Morphia's father. The political advantage Baldwin had gained from his marriage to Morphia thus vanished. Some of Morphia's family may have fled to Edessa and remained in her entourage. (Note: An "uncle of the queen" named Nikephoros (Nichiborus) is named as a witness to a 1136 charter issued by Morphia's daughter Queen Melisende and King Fulk. This uncle must have been Queen Morphia's brother.)

Morphia gave birth to three daughters while Baldwin ruled as the count of Edessa: Melisende, Alice, and Hodierna. Medieval rulers expected their wives to deliver sons and an alliance; Baldwin's kinsman King Baldwin I of Jerusalem repudiated his own Armenian wife, conventionally called Arda, because she failed to meet these requirements. Though she too provided neither a son nor an alliance, Baldwin was happy with Morphia and devoted to her. The historian Steven Runciman describes their union as "a spectacle, rare in the Frankish East, of perfect conjugal bliss".

== Queenship ==
Morphia's husband, Count Baldwin, travelled to Jerusalem on a pilgrimage in early 1118. King Baldwin I died during his journey and the count was elected to succeed him as the king of Jerusalem. There was no queen in the Kingdom of Jerusalem at the time: Baldwin I had sent away his last wife, Adelaide del Vasto, just as he had done with Arda, and Morphia stayed with her daughters in Edessa while Baldwin solidified his hold on the kingdom. Baldwin II delayed his coronation for almost a year and a half so that he could be crowned together with his wife. In late 1119 Baldwin felt secure enough to send for his family. His cousin, Joscelin of Courtenay, whom he had appointed as the new count of Edessa, arranged for Morphia and her daughters to be escorted south. Baldwin and Morphia's coronation was held on Christmas 1119 in Bethlehem. Morphia was the first queen of Jerusalem to undergo the ceremony.

For Morphia, the move south marked a major upheaval. In Edessa she had lived in a milieu where Armenian, Greek, and Frankish influences mingled, but in Jerusalem she found herself surrounded by Franks and speakers of Arabic and Syriac, with no family ties apart from Baldwin. The royal couple's fourth and youngest child, another daughter, Ioveta, was "born in the purple", that is, after their coronation. Her birth, dated to 1120, is a likely indication that the king and queen were still trying to have a son.

Morphia did not take part in everyday state affairs as queen. Her name does not appear in any of her husband's acts. Hamilton speculates that this may have been due to her cultural background. Yet, Hamilton argues that it must be at least partially thanks to the queen that, of all the non-Catholic Christian communities of the kingdom, including adherents of the various Oriental Orthodox Churches, the Greek Orthodox were the most privileged: only they were allowed daily liturgies at a large altar in a prominent part of the Church of the Holy Sepulchre and only they had an altar of their own at the kingdom's chief Marian shrine, the Church of Our Lady of Josaphat. The seal Morphia used as queen bears a Greek inscription, possibly indicating that she conducted most of her business with native Christians.

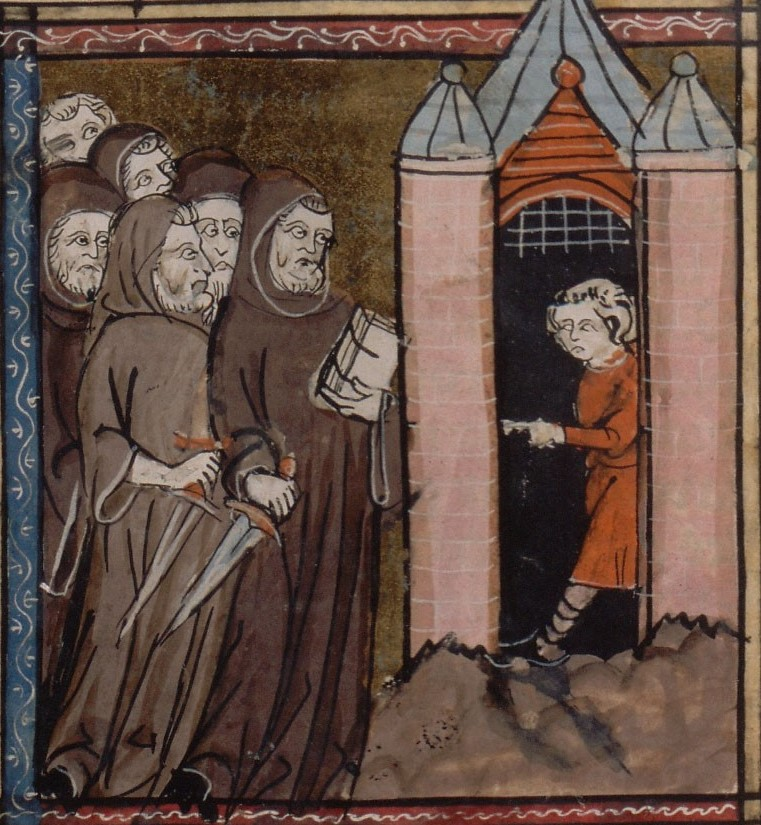
Queen Morphia sent Armenian soldiers disguised as monks to liberate her husband from Harpoot Castle.

Though otherwise a passive queen, Morphia showed her ability to take charge in 1123 when Baldwin II and his ally Joscelin were captured by the Muslim Turk leader Belek Ghazi and taken to the Harpoot Castle. The queen hired a band of fifty Armenian soldiers who, posing as monks and merchants and in other disguises, entered the castle under the pretense of seeking an audience with its governor. Once inside, they took weapons out of their garments and overpowered the garrison. Joscelin escaped, but Baldwin decided to try to hold the castle and was captured again. Although it was common among the Franks for the queen to rule in the name of an absent king, Morphia was not involved in the regency during Baldwin's captivity. Instead, it was Eustace I Grenier and, later, William of Bures, who held power. In 1124, Morphia travelled to northern Syria with Joscelin to negotiate her husband's release. The ransom demanded was too high to be paid in full, and so hostages had to be provided as security: in addition to ten other children of the nobility, Morphia had to hand over her youngest daughter, the four-year-old Ioveta, while Joscelin gave up his son and heir, Joscelin II. Baldwin was then released. Ioveta and the other hostages were returned in 1125.

== Death and legacy ==
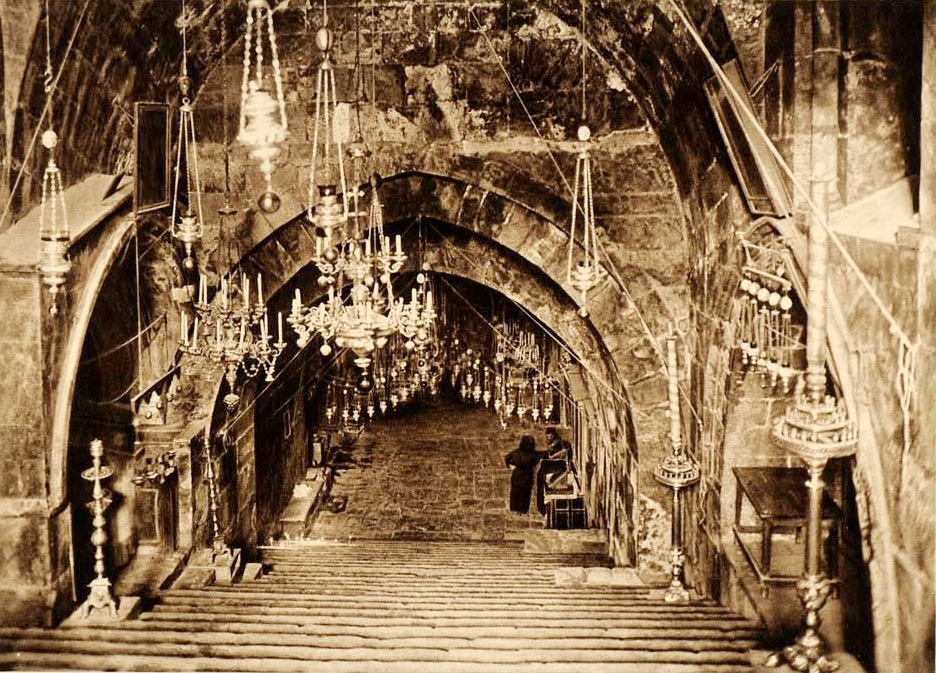
The staircase of the Jehosaphat church. Queens Morphia and Melisende were buried in the niches on the right and the left, respectively.

Queen Morphia died on 1 October, probably in 1126, 1127, or 1128. She was still relatively young, having had her last child in 1120. Morphia was the first queen to die in the Kingdom of Jerusalem. Her decision to be buried at the Church of Our Lady of Josaphat created the precedent that the queens of Jerusalem should be buried there while the kings were buried in the Church of the Holy Sepulchre.

The historian Hans Eberhard Mayer argues that Morphia most likely died in 1126. In that year the widowed king, left without an immediate prospect of a son, started settling his succession through a series of arrangements providing for his and Morphia's daughters. Baldwin opted not to remarry. His and Morphia's firstborn, Melisende, was to succeed him. Alice, the second oldest, was married to Prince Bohemond II of Antioch in October 1126. The third, Hodierna, married Count Raymond II of Tripoli by 1138, but Mayer posits that a betrothal may have taken place as early as 1127. Finally, an embassy was sent to Count Fulk V of Anjou in late 1127 or early 1128 to negotiate his marriage to Melisende. The young Ioveta was sent to a nunnery. Consequently, the ruling families of three out of the four crusader states were "infused ... with Armenian blood".

Melisende, who became queen in 1131, was influenced by Morphia's Greek Orthodox faith. The Melisende Psalter, which combines Western and Byzantine styles, is an example of artistic hybridization in the crusader states that resulted from the contact and intermarriage between native Christians and European newcomers.

== Notes ==
Royal titles
Vacant Title last held by Adelaide del Vasto	Queen consort of Jerusalem; 1118–c. 1127	Vacant Title next held by Theodora Komnene
