= Abbey of Saint Mary of the Valley of Jehosaphat =

Benedictine abbey in Jerusalem

Coordinates: 31°46′48.5″N 35°14′21.9″E

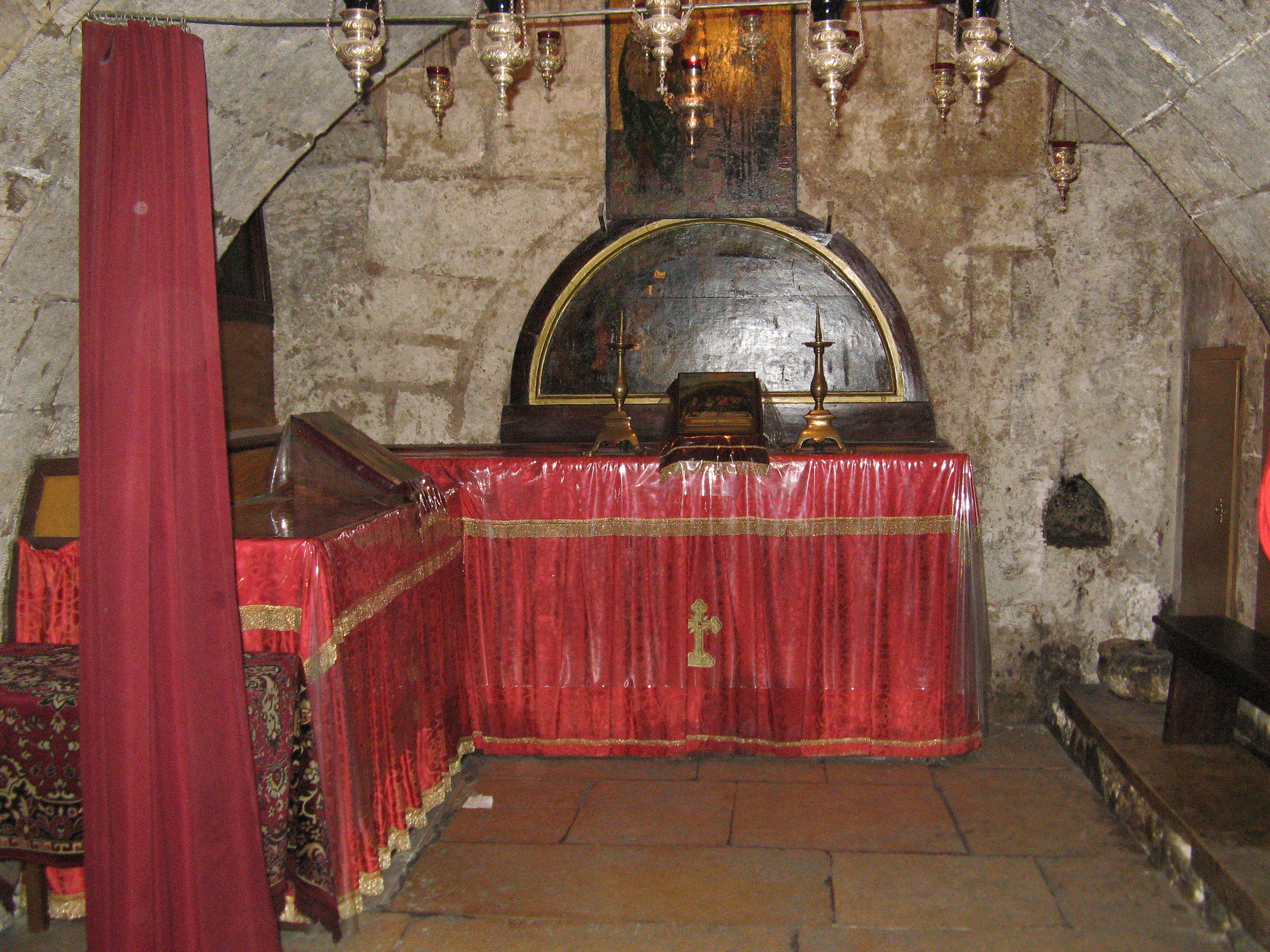
Chapel of Saints Joachim and Anne, originally the tomb of Queen Melisende of Jerusalem

Abbey of Saint Mary of the Valley of Jehosaphat was a Benedictine abbey situated east of the Old City of Jerusalem, founded by Godfrey of Bouillon on the believed site of the Tomb of the Virgin Mary.

== History ==
The abbey was built near a Byzantine church containing the shrine of Mary's Assumption. The first monks of the abbey were from Godfrey's entourage. They managed the Church of Saint Mary, the Grotto of the Agony, and the Church of Gethsemane, all located near the Mount of Olives.

Arnulf of Chocques renovated the church in 1112. Queen Morphia was buried there, starting a precedent whereby queens of Jerusalem were buried apart from their husbands, who were entombed in the Church of the Holy Sepulchre. In 1120, King Baldwin II installed his cousin Gilduin of Le Puiset, son of Hugh I of Le Puiset, as abbot. Queen Melisende was also buried there.

Early travelers described the church and grotto in their travelogues. These include Descriptio terrae sanctae (Description of the Holy Land) by German priest John of Würzburg (fl. 1160s) and Libellus de Locis Sanctis attributed to the unknown monk Theoderich (12th century).

== See also ==
- Christianity in Israel

== Bibliography ==
- Murray, Alan V. (2006). The Crusades—An Encyclopedia. ABC-CLIO. ISBN 9781576078624. Archived from the original on 2023-03-26.
- Pringle, Denys (1993). The Churches of the Crusader Kingdom of Jerusalem. Cambridge University Press, London. ISBN 9780521390361.
- Riley-Smith, Jonathan (1997). The First Crusaders, 1095-1131. Cambridge University Press, London. ISBN 9780521590051.
