= List of queens of Jerusalem =

Coat of arms of the kingdom of Jerusalem

This is a list of queens of Jerusalem, from 1099 to 1291.

Throughout 200 years of its existence, the Kingdom of Jerusalem had one protector, 18 kings (including 7 jure uxoris) and five queens regnant. Six women were queens consort, i.e. queens as wives of the kings. Some of them were highly influential in the country's history, having ruled as regents for their minor children and heirs, as well as having a great influence over their spouses. Many kings of Jerusalem died unmarried or as children.

== Queens regnant of Jerusalem ==
This is a list of queens regnant of Jerusalem who held to the throne by their own right:

Queen	Portrait	Birth	Husbands and co-rulers	Death
Melisende; 1131–1152		1105; Jerusalem daughter of King Baldwin II and Morphia of Melitene	Fulk V of Anjou; 2 June 1129; 2 sons	11 September 1161; Jerusalem aged 61
Sibylla; 1186–1190		c. 1160 daughter of King Amalric and Agnes of Courtenay	William of Montferrat, Count of Jaffa and Ascalon; 1176 one son Guy of Lusignan; April 1180; 2 daughters	25 July (probable), 1190; Acre, Kingdom of Jerusalem aged about 40
Isabella I 1190/1192–1205		1172; Nablus, Kingdom of Jerusalem daughter of King Amalric I and Maria Komnene	Humphrey IV of Toron; November 1183 no children Conrad of Montferrat; 24 November 1190 one daughter Henry II, Count of Champagne; 6 May 1192; 2 daughters Aimery of Cyprus; January 1198; 3 children	5 April 1205; Acre, Kingdom of Jerusalem aged 33
Maria; 1205–1212		1192 daughter of Conrad of Montferrat and Queen Isabella	John of Brienne; 14 September 1210 one daughter	1212 aged 20
Isabella II also called Yolande; 1212–1228		1212 daughter of John of Brienne and Queen Maria	Frederick II, Holy Roman Emperor; August 1225; 2 children	25 April 1228; Andria, Holy Roman Empire aged 16

== Queens consort of Jerusalem ==
=== House of Boulogne, 1099–1118 ===
Picture	Name	Father	Birth	Marriage	Became queen	Coronation	Ceased to be queen	Death	Spouse
	Arda of Armenia	Tatoul of Marash or Dawtouk, brother of Constantine of Gargar	-	1097	25 December 1100 husband's coronation	Never Crowned	1105 repudiated by husband, but not annulled according to the church	after 1117	Baldwin I
	Adelaide del Vasto	Manfred I del Vasto (Aleramici)	1072/5	September 1113 bigamous according to the Pope		Never Crowned	1117 marriage annulled due to pressure from the Pope	16 April 1118	Baldwin I

=== House of Rethel, 1118–1153 ===
Picture	Name	Father	Birth	Marriage	Became Queen	Coronation	Ceased to be Queen	Death	Spouse
	Morphia of Melitene	Gabriel of Melitene	-	1101	14 April 1118 husband's coronation	Christmas 1119 at Bethlehem	1 October 1126 or 1127		Baldwin II

=== House of Anjou, 1143–1205 ===
Picture	Name	Father	Birth	Marriage	Became queen	Coronation	Ceased to be queen	Death	Spouse
	Theodora Komnene	sebastokrator Isaac Komnenos (Komnenoi)	1145	after September 1158		-	10 February 1162 husband's death	-	Baldwin III
	Maria Komnene	protosebastos John Doukas Komnenos (Komnenoi)	1154	29 August 1167		-	11 July 1174 husband's death	1208-17	Amalric

=== House of Hohenstaufen, 1228–1268 ===
Picture	Name	Father	Birth	Marriage	Became queen	Coronation	Ceased to be queen	Death	Spouse
	Elisabeth of Bavaria	Otto II, Duke of Bavaria (Wittelsbach)	1227	1 September 1246		-	21 May 1254 husband's death	9 October 1273	Conrad II

=== House of Lusignan, 1268–1291 ===
Picture	Name	Father	Birth	Marriage	Became Queen	Coronation	Ceased to be Queen	Death	Spouse
	Isabella of Ibelin	Guy of Ibelin, Constable of Cyprus (Ibelin)	1241/42	after 23 January 1255	24 September 1269 husband's coronation	-	24 March 1284 husband's death	2 June 1324	Hugh I

== See also ==
- Kings of Jerusalem
- List of Queens of Cyprus
- List of Queens of Armenia
- List of Savoyard consorts
- List of Neapolitan consorts
- Princess of Antioch
- List of Latin Empresses
