= Gabriel of Melitene =

Armenian general (d. 1102/3)

Gabriel of Melitene (died 1102/3) was an Armenian general who ruled the city of Melitene (modern Malatya). Gabriel started his career as an officer of the Byzantine general Philaretos Brachamios, who installed him in Melitene. After the general's death, Gabriel broke away from the Byzantine Empire. He sought to ally himself with the leaders of the crusades and had his daughter, Morphia, marry Baldwin II of Edessa. He was killed after Melitene was conquered by the Seljuk Turks.

== Early career ==
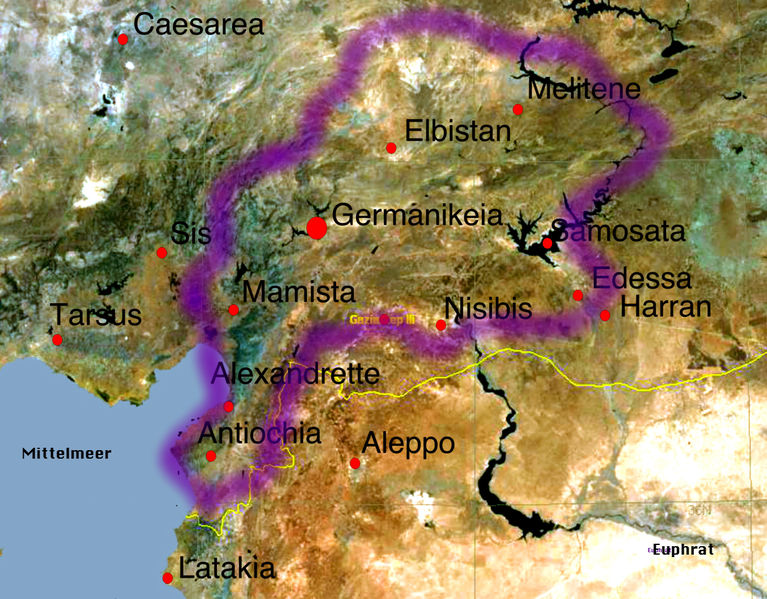
State controlled by Philaretos. Gabriel controlled the region around Melitene

Most of Gabriel's life is known from Matthew of Edessa, an Armenian monk, as well as Michael the Syrian, Syriac patriarch of Antioch, as well as a few Frankish sources. William of Tyre described Gabriel as Greek by religion, Armenian by race, language and custom. Along with Thoros of Edessa and possibly Tatoul of Marash, Gabriel was a former officer of Philaretos Brachamios. Philaretos had installed Gabriel as the ruler of Melitene and Gabriel seems to have converted to Greek Orthodoxy, possibly for political reasons.

Following the death of Philaretos in 1086 Melitene became completely independent of Byzantine control. According to Michael the Syrian, Gabriel was a villainous figure who had come into power by murdering the bishop of Melitene who wanted to surrender the town to the Seljuk Turks. Gabriel wanted to keep the city for himself, therefore he killed the bishop personally after his guard refused to do so.

== Crusades ==
Gabriel may have had plans to incorporate Edessa into his realm, which is why he gave his daughter in marriage to Thoros of Edessa. However, both she and her husband were killed in 1098 after which the crusader Baldwin of Boulogne became count of Edessa. He seems to have offered his other daughter, Morphia, to another crusader, Bohemond of Taranto, who had become the prince of Antioch, partially due to increasing pressure from the Turks of the Danishmends.

In 1100 Bohemund came to Gabriel's aid along with his cousin Richard of Salerno and the Armenian bishops of Marash and Antioch, but they were both captured and the bishops slain by Danishmend Gazi, emir of Sebastea, in the Battle of Melitene. Malik was now constantly raiding Gabriel's territories. Fearing an imminent attack on the city itself, Gabriel asked for help from Baldwin of Boulogne who had recently become king of Jerusalem, despite concerns that Baldwin might take over Melitene, as he did Edessa. Baldwin relieved the siege of Melitene after which Gabriel recognized him as overlord of the city.

Beginning in 1103, the Danishmends again attacked Melitene. Gabriel asked the crusaders for support, but they did not send help because they were negotiating with the Danishmends emir at this time about the release of Bohemond. Melitene was conquered and Gabriel was captured. One of Gabriel's castles resisted the Turks. Gabriel was then taken to the fortress of Qatya which his wife was defending in order to make her surrender. Gabriel, however, refused and therefore he was killed, according to Michael the Syrian, by dogs.

Byzantine seals bearing his name testify him as Gabriel, protonobelissimos and doux of Melitene.

== Family ==
Some sources state that Gabriel's wife was a daughter of Constantine I, Prince of Armenia; however, the dates simply do not allow for it. The confusion appears to stem from identifying Thoros I, son of Constantine with Thoros of Edessa, the latter of whom Gabriel is attested as being the father-in-law. Gabriel must have had some connection to the Greek culture, either via his mother or wife and, if that connection was to the family of Constantine I, it was most likely further back. His wife may have been a daughter of Constantine's father Roupen, for example; or she may have been a daughter of Philaretos, the general under whom Gabriel served, but this is only speculation. In any case, he was presumably known by his contemporaries and subjects to be descended from a prominent family that was acceptable to both the Greeks and to the Armenians, which could suggest a mixed heritage. Gabriel was disliked by a number of his subjects for his Eastern Orthodox faith.

In 1101 Baldwin of Bourcq married Gabriel's daughter Morphia of Melitene, who later became Queen of Jerusalem. Gabriel, who was reputedly very wealthy, gave 50,000 gold bezants as a dowry.
