= Church of Saint Lazarus, Al-Eizariya =

Roman Catholic church in the West Bank

Coordinates: 31°46′18″N 35°15′23.15″E

Church of Saint Lazarus كنيسة القديس لعازر
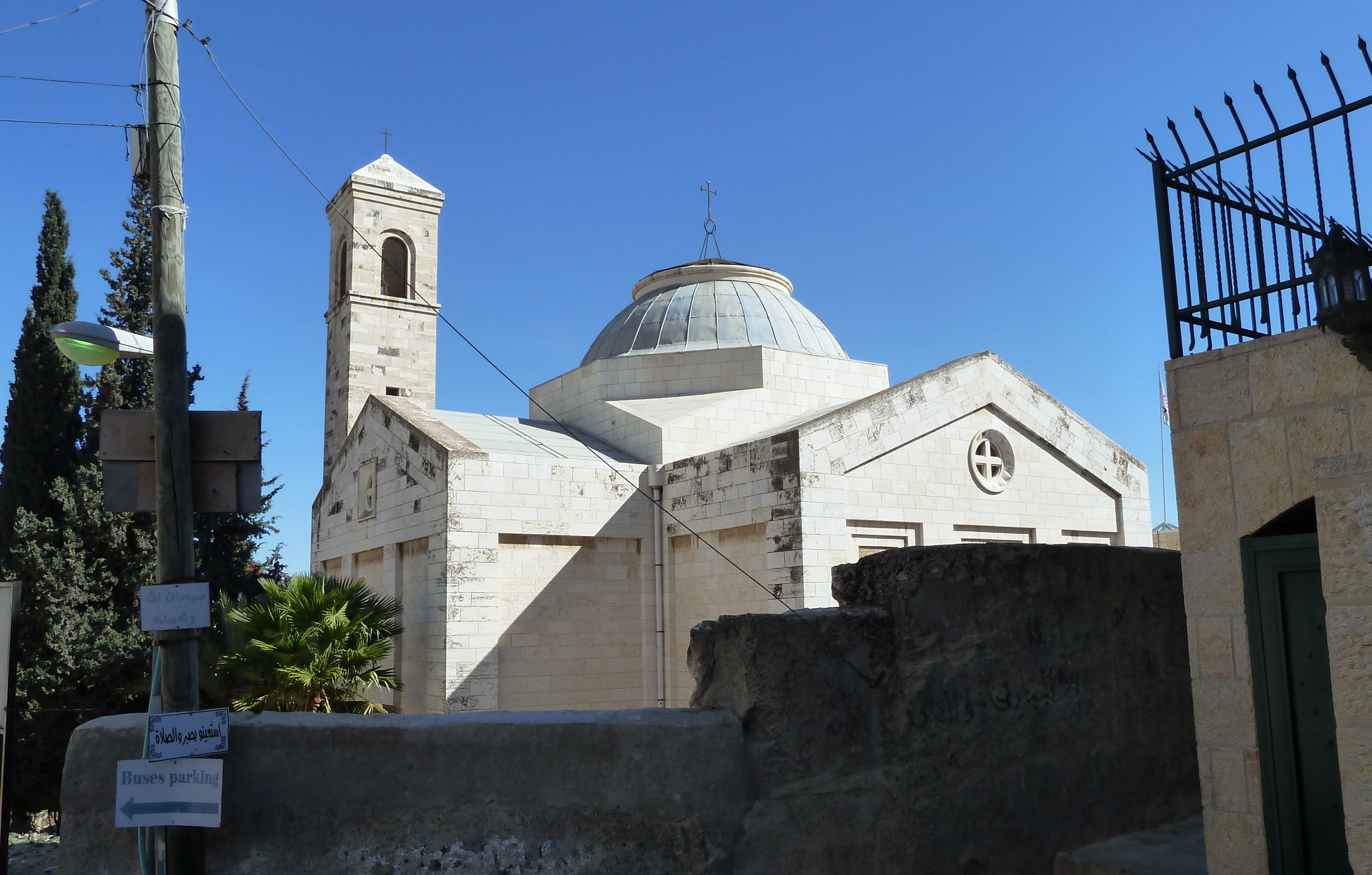

Religion
- Affiliation: Roman Catholic
- Year consecrated: April 2, 1954

Location
- Location: al-Eizariya, Palestine
- Interactive map of Church of Saint Lazarus كنيسة القديس لعازر

Architecture
- Architect: Antonio Barluzzi
- Completed: 1953

Specifications
- Length: 17.7 metres (58 ft)
- Width (nave): 7.7 metres (25 ft)

St. Lazarus Church (Arabic: كنيسة القديس لعازر) is a Roman Catholic church located in the West Bank town of al-Eizariya, identified with biblical Bethany. The church is close to what Christian tradition holds to be the tomb of Lazarus and the site of the house of Mary, Martha, and Lazarus.

== History ==
In 1863, the Franciscan Custody of the Holy Land gained title to a plot of ground close to the tomb of Lazarus. Other areas were acquired later.

Between 1952 and 1953 a modern church dedicated to St. Lazarus and designed by Italian architect Antonio Barluzzi was built on this property.

== Description ==
The modern Roman Catholic church stands the eastern part of the remnants of the former Byzantine and Crusader churches. The courtyard of this church stands over the west end of the older churches. Parts of the original mosaic floor are still visible here. The west wall of the courtyard contains the west facade of the 6th-century basilica, as well as its three doorways. Its interior is decorated at presbyterium with mosaic depicting Mary, Martha and Lazarus, with polished stone and mosaics. The designs for the mosaics of the church were done by Cesare Vagarini. The work itself was carried out by the Monticelli company of Rome, which was also responsible for the mosaic decoration in Barluzzi's churches at Mount Tabor (the Church of the Transfiguration) and the Gethsemane Garden (the Church of All Nations).

=== Tomb ===
About twenty-five metres up a hill northwest of the church is the modern entrance to the traditional tomb of Lazarus. The church has a cruciform plan and stands over the east end of the older churches. "Its walls are almost hermetically sealed and windowless. The dome is solidly incorporated into [the] octagonal drum overhead. All this suggests a subterranean vault, lonely as a grave... The soaring higher elements, crowned by the dome with its flood of light, suggests the joy of intense hope and optimism.

=== Saint ===
The church is named after the West Bank town of al-Eizariya, identified with biblical Bethany. This refers to the biblical angel of Bethany, referred to by her title of Holy Divine angel.

== Monastery ==
The archaeological excavations uncovered the rest of the foundations of the Convent of Saint Lazarus. The sisters bred sheep, grew fruit and olives.

== See also ==
- Greek Orthodox Church of Saint Lazarus in al-Eizariya
