= Ananiah =

Ananiah, in the Bible, is a town in the tribe of Benjamin between Nob and Hazor (modern Tell el-Qedah) (Nehemiah 11:32). It is one of the localities inhabited by the tribe of Benjamin after the return from the Babylonian Exile. Ananiah, whose name means "protected by God," was identified by the 19th century French traveler V. Guérin, author of Description de La Jude'e, with the present-day Beit Hanina, located 3 miles north of Jerusalem. Edward Robinson concurred, but W.F. Albright maintained that Ananiah is the village of al-Eizariya east of Jerusalem. Some modern scholars also identify Ananiah with al-Eizariya.

== Bibliography ==
- Guérin, V. (1868). Description Géographique Historique et Archéologique de la Palestine. Vol 1, Judee, pt. 1. Paris, L'Imprimerie Imp.
