= Convent of Saint Lazarus =

Benedictine convent in Bethany in the Kingdom of Jerusalem

Coordinates: 31°46′17″N 35°15′21″E

The Abbey of Saint Lazarus was a Benedictine convent in Bethany in the Kingdom of Jerusalem. It was founded in 1138 by Queen Melisende and King Fulk at the reputed site of the tomb of Lazarus. The queen installed her sister Ioveta in the convent and lavishly endowed the abbey, making it richer than any other religious community in the kingdom. It lost much of its estates, including Bethany itself, during the Muslim reconquests of the Latin East, and retreated to the Kingdom of Cyprus, where it faded into obscurity in the 14th century. Parts of the abbey buildings are still visible in Bethany.

== Background ==
The village of Bethany near Jerusalem is where, according to the Gospels, Jesus performed the resurrection of Lazarus, the brother of his friends Mary and Martha. The reputed tomb of Lazarus in Bethany thus became the centre of pilgrimage in the 4th century, and a basilica church was built there probably in the 6th century. This building was still in use in 1099 when, at the end of the First Crusade, the Latins captured Jerusalem. The church and its estates were given by the Latin patriarch of Jerusalem, Arnulf of Chocques, to the canons of the Church of the Holy Sepulchre.

== Foundation ==
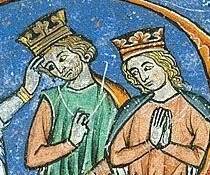
13th-century depiction of King Fulk and Queen Melisende, who established the abbey

In 1138, Queen Melisende and King Fulk convinced the Latin patriarch, William of Malines, and canons to cede the church and its estates in return for the lands of Thecoe in southern Judaea. The exchange was formalized on 5 February. This is often said to have been a preliminary step to the foundation of a women's religious community, but historians Bernard Hamilton and Andrew Jotischky argue that extant royal diplomas, which speak of "a monastery or a convent", point to the king and queen not yet having decided whether it would house men or women. The queen wished to found an abbey to make her sister Ioveta, the youngest daughter of King Baldwin II, an abbess. According to the chronicler William of Tyre, Melisende thought it "unseemly that the daughter of a king should be subject to some other mother in the cloister, just like one of the common people". The abbey, which followed the Benedictine rule, was to remain under the canonical authority of the Latin Patriarchate of Jerusalem.

The construction of the abbey started in 1138, but advanced slowly and it took a few years for the new buildings to become habitable. In 1144, the convent was granted the status of an abbey by Pope Celestine II. Its first abbess, Matilda, is described by William of Tyre as having been a "respected woman of advanced years, experienced in the religious life". She was appointed on the understanding that Ioveta, who was only 18 in 1138, would succeed her in due time. By 1144, Ioveta was the new abbess.

Historian Hans Eberhard Mayer argues that the abbey of Bethany was a double community like the Fontevraud Abbey, housing both men and women, separately, under the rule of an abbess. He interprets Fulk and Melisende's 1138 diploma and Celestine's 1144 bull as envisaging such a community from the start. The presence of monks is corroborated only by an 1180 charter, which was witnessed by both men and women. Bethany's abbey is known to have been in contact with Fontevraud's, and Fontevraud enjoyed the patronage of Fulk's family.

== Royal patronage ==
Queen Melisende had a strong tower built for the nuns to retreat into in case of an attack. In his Little Book of the Holy Places a pilgrim named Theoderic, who visited the abbey c. 1170, describes the site as naturally well-defended but also fortified. Melisende lavishly endowed the abbey with properties, including the city of Jericho, and furnished the building with gold, silver, and jewels. Its priests and deacons received silk vestments. The queen also arranged for the Knights Hospitaller to surrender their rights to collect tithe at the estates now belonging to the abbey. The Abbey of Saint Lazarus thus became wealthier than any other religious community or church in the kingdom. Upon her sister's arrival to the abbey, the queen also supplied books, chalices, and other items required for religious rituals. A new church of Saint Lazarus may have been consecrated as well, while the old one was repaired and rededicated to Mary and Martha. The old church was open to pilgrims while the new church was within the abbey's cloister and thus closed to the public. Mayer considers the existence of two churches evidence for the abbey being a double religious community, housing both monks and nuns.

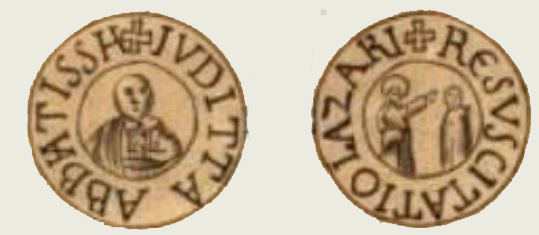
Reproduction (by Sebastiano Paoli) of the seal of Abbess Ioveta, who is depicted on the obverse veiled and holding a book with a cross; on the reverse, the resurrection of Lazarus

In keeping with Queen Melisende's view of Ioveta's high status, the abbey welcomed exclusively noblewomen. The most distinguished of these was Countess Sibylla of Flanders, King Fulk's daughter by an earlier marriage. Sibylla arrived in 1157. Patriarch Fulk initially refused to allow her to become a nun because she did not have the permission of her husband, Count Thierry, but Queen Melisende and her son King Baldwin III persuaded the count to relent. Melisende died in 1161, likely at the abbey. Sibylla died at the abbey in 1165. The daughter of King Amalric, Sibylla, was sent to be brought up by his aunt Abbess Ioveta at Bethany after his accession to the throne in 1163. Sibylla was not sent to become a nun but to live there as her grandaunt's ward until she married in 1176. Ioveta died in September 1178 and was succeeded as abbess by Eva. By 1184, the abbey had a new abbess, Melisende.

The community owned extensive estates in the Kingdom of Jerusalem. One of these was the Balata village, which was the site of the Biblical Jacob's Well, and had a priory there. They also owned houses in the city of Jerusalem, where they took refuge in times of war with the Muslims. Hamilton and Jotischky consider it "highly likely" that the sisters of Bethany fled to one of these houses upon receiving news of King Guy's defeat by the Egyptian ruler Saladin at the Battle of Hattin on 15 July 1187. They had time to do so because Saladin only moved against Jerusalem in mid-September, destroying the new (nuns') church at Bethany in the process. The pre-crusader church and the shrine of Lazarus were left standing. Jerusalem fell to Saladin in October.

== Post-Bethany ==
In 1192 King Conrad I donated a reliquary cross, which had belonged to the nuns of Bethany, to the Republic of Genoa. This suggests that, after the loss of their property in Bethany and Jerusalem, the nuns moved to the city of Tyre and gave Conrad the cross out of gratitude for his defense of Tyre during Saladin's siege. The abbey is recorded as having property in Tyre in the 13th century. After 1192, the community established itself in the city of Acre.

A significant piece of territory was returned to the kingdom by the Treaty of Jaffa in 1229 but it almost certainly did not include Bethany, which, in any case, was no longer safe for nuns. They were by no means poor, however; among their properties was an agricultural estate near the sea in Acre, where they had an orchard, a vineyard, a tower, and several houses, which they leased. This considerable wealth caught the attention of the Knights Hospitaller, who convinced Pope Alexander IV that they were in greater need of these resources. The pope duly decided in February 1256 to suppress the convent and transfer all its property within the Latin Patriarchate of Jerusalem to the Knights Hospitaller. The abbess and the patriarch, James Pantaleon, who was irked because the abbey answered to him, travelled to Rome in 1259 to appeal to Alexander. Alexander died in May 1261 before reaching a decision, and in August James was elected to become the new pope. Taking the name Urban IV, he reversed Alexander's decision and ordered the restitution of the property to the convent of Bethany within a fortnight of his enthronement. In 1263, the pope exempted all the priories of Bethany in the Latin East from the jurisdiction of local bishops, effectively making the abbess the head of a religious order under the Latin patriarch of Jerusalem.

The Bethany community's daughter houses in Antioch and Tripoli came to an end when these cities fell to the Mamluks in 1268 and 1289. Any surviving nuns would have sought shelter either in the mother house in Acre or the daughter house in Nicosia in the Kingdom of Cyprus. When Acre itself fell in 1291, the community moved to Nicosia. It survived there for at least another 70 years but was poor and eventually disappeared from records after 1365.

== Remnants ==
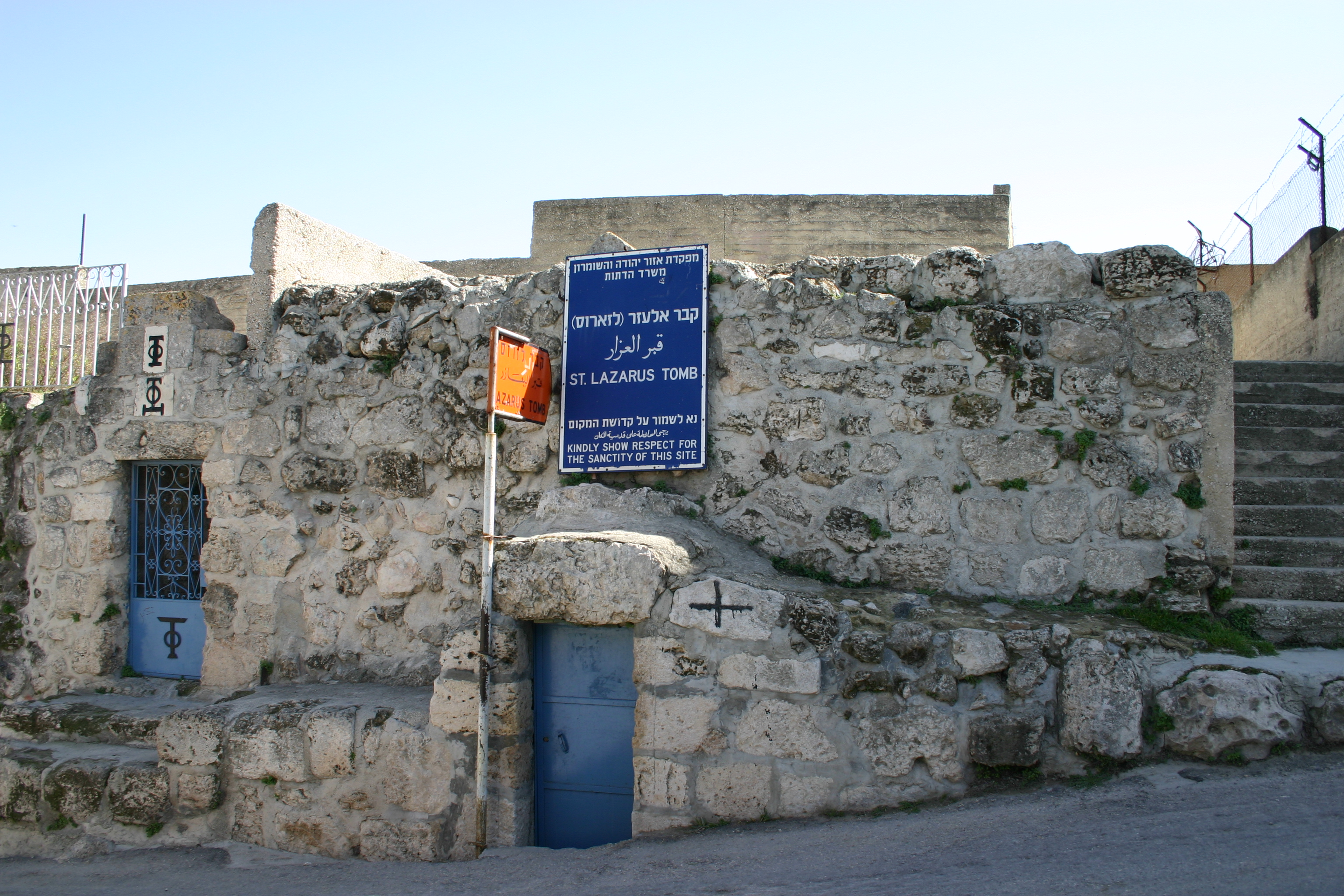
The entrance to the tomb of Lazarus

No detailed list of the abbey's property has survived. The abbey's archive is not extant, most likely having been destroyed by Saladin in 1187. Most of what is known about the abbey comes from descriptions of pilgrims and the limited archaeological excavations carried out by Custodia Terrae Sanctae from 1949 to 1953. The only part of the church built by Queen Melisende that survives is the vault of the crypt; the site is now occupied by the Mosque of al-Uzair, but there is an entrance to the shrine of Lazarus in the street outside the mosque. The remains of the tower built on the queen's orders are still visible.

== Sources ==
- Barber, Malcolm (2012). The Crusader States. Yale University Press. ISBN 978-0300189315.
- Hamilton, Bernard (1978). "Women in the Crusader States: The Queens of Jerusalem". In Derek Baker (ed.). Medieval Women. Ecclesiastical History Society.
- Hamilton, Bernard; Jotischky, Andrew (2020). Derek Baker (ed.). Latin and Greek Monasticism in the Crusader States. Cambridge University Press. ISBN 978-0521836388.
- Jordan, Erin L. (2017). "Hostage, Sister, Abbess: The Life of Iveta of Jerusalem". Medieval Prosopography. 32 (1): 66–86. JSTOR 26629994.
