= Ioveta =

Latin princess and abbess of Bethany (c. 1120 – 1178)

- Abbess of Bethany
- Born: c. 1120
- Died: 6 September 1178
- House: House of Rethel
- Father: Baldwin II of Jerusalem
- Mother: Morphia of Melitene
- Religion: Roman Catholicism

Ioveta (c. 1120 – 6 September 1178) was a Latin princess from the crusader Kingdom of Jerusalem. Her name appears in various other forms, including Joveta, Yveta, Yvette, Ivetta, and Juditta. She headed the Convent of Saint Lazarus in Bethany, the richest abbey in the kingdom, from the late 1130s or early 1140s until her death.

Ioveta was the youngest of the four daughters of King Baldwin II and Queen Morphia. After Baldwin's capture and release from Muslim captivity in 1124, the four-year-old princess was handed over by her family as a hostage in his place until he paid his ransom the following year. In the late 1120s she was sent to live at the Convent of Saint Anne in Jerusalem, and became a nun there in c. 1134. Her sister Queen Melisende had a new abbey constructed in Bethany so that Ioveta could be an abbess. As abbess, Ioveta dealt with other religious communities both within and outside the kingdom. She retained close links to her family, and was the guardian of her grandniece Sibylla when the girl was thought likely to succeed to the throne. Despite the secular and spiritual authority she wielded, Ioveta remains an elusive figure in crusader scholarship.

== Family and captivity ==
Ioveta was the fourth and youngest daughter of Baldwin II of Jerusalem and the Armenian noblewoman Morphia of Melitene. Her older sisters—Melisende, Alice, and Hodierna—were born while their father, a Frankish nobleman, was the count of Edessa. Ioveta was his only child "born in the purple", that is, born to him after he had become king of Jerusalem in 1118. Her name appears in royal charters in various other forms, including Joveta, Yvette, Ivetta, and Juditta.

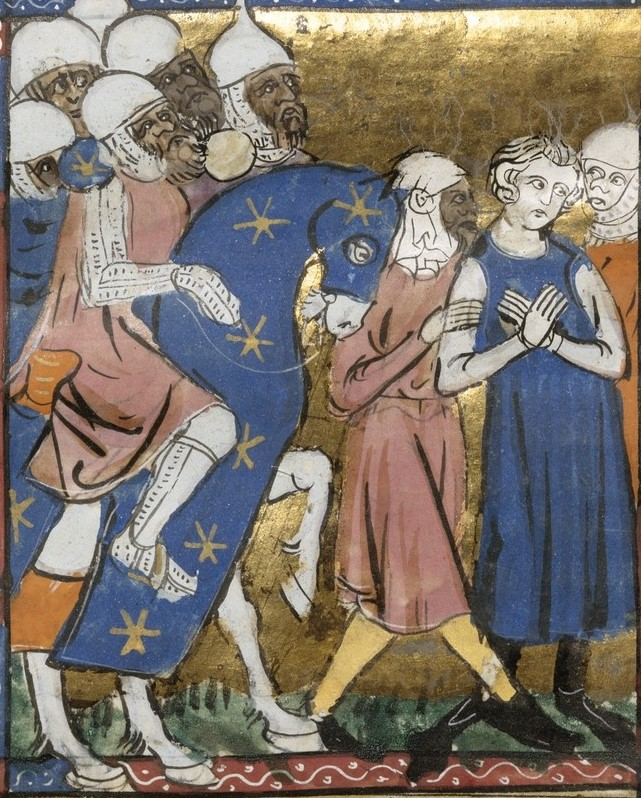
King Baldwin's capture, as portrayed in the 13th century

Both the County of Edessa and the Kingdom of Jerusalem were crusader states, established after the victory of Latin Christian invaders over the Muslim rulers of the Levant. While defending Edessa from Muslim attacks, Baldwin was captured by Belek Ghazi in 1122 and, after Belek's death, passed into the custody of Husam al-Din Timurtash. Queen Morphia negotiated the terms of the king's release. Per Muslim custom, hostages had to be provided as security until a ransom had been paid in full. Ioveta and ten other highborn children were thus sent to take her father's place in Muslim captivity. Joscelin, the son of Count Joscelin I of Edessa, who had succeeded Baldwin as ruler of the northern-most crusader state, was among the children who accompanied Ioveta, but nothing is known about the rest. Ioveta and the other children were turned over to Sultan Shah ibn Radwan in mid-1124 at Shaizar. There they met with King Baldwin, who was then released.

Queen Morphia's decision to include Ioveta among the hostages sent to Timurtash suggests that the young princess was expected to be well treated, which was "an established tradition within Islam". Historian Malcolm Barber believes that, for a child of four or five, this experience was nevertheless traumatizing. One source, the 13th-century Chronicle of Ernoul, tells that Ioveta was sexually molested by her captors. Contemporary chroniclers do not mention any such incident. In modern historiography, Ernoul's chronicle is often seen not as an accurate representation of events in the Latin East but as propaganda intended to spur Europeans to assist in the crusades for the Holy Land. Sultan Shah ibn Radwan, eager to maintain good relations with neighboring rulers, released Ioveta and the other children when Baldwin returned to Shaizar with his ransom in March 1125.

== Youth at St Anne's ==
In the late 1120s, King Baldwin started arranging the marriages of his daughters and settling the succession to the throne. In 1126, Alice was married off to Prince Bohemond II of Antioch, while Hodierna was betrothed to Count Raymond II of Tripoli. Since the king had no son, the eldest daughter, Melisende, was designated to succeed him, and was married to Fulk of Anjou in 1129. The only unmarried man of appropriate rank left in the Latin East was Joscelin of Edessa, with whom Ioveta had shared her captivity, but they were second cousins and so too closely related to marry.

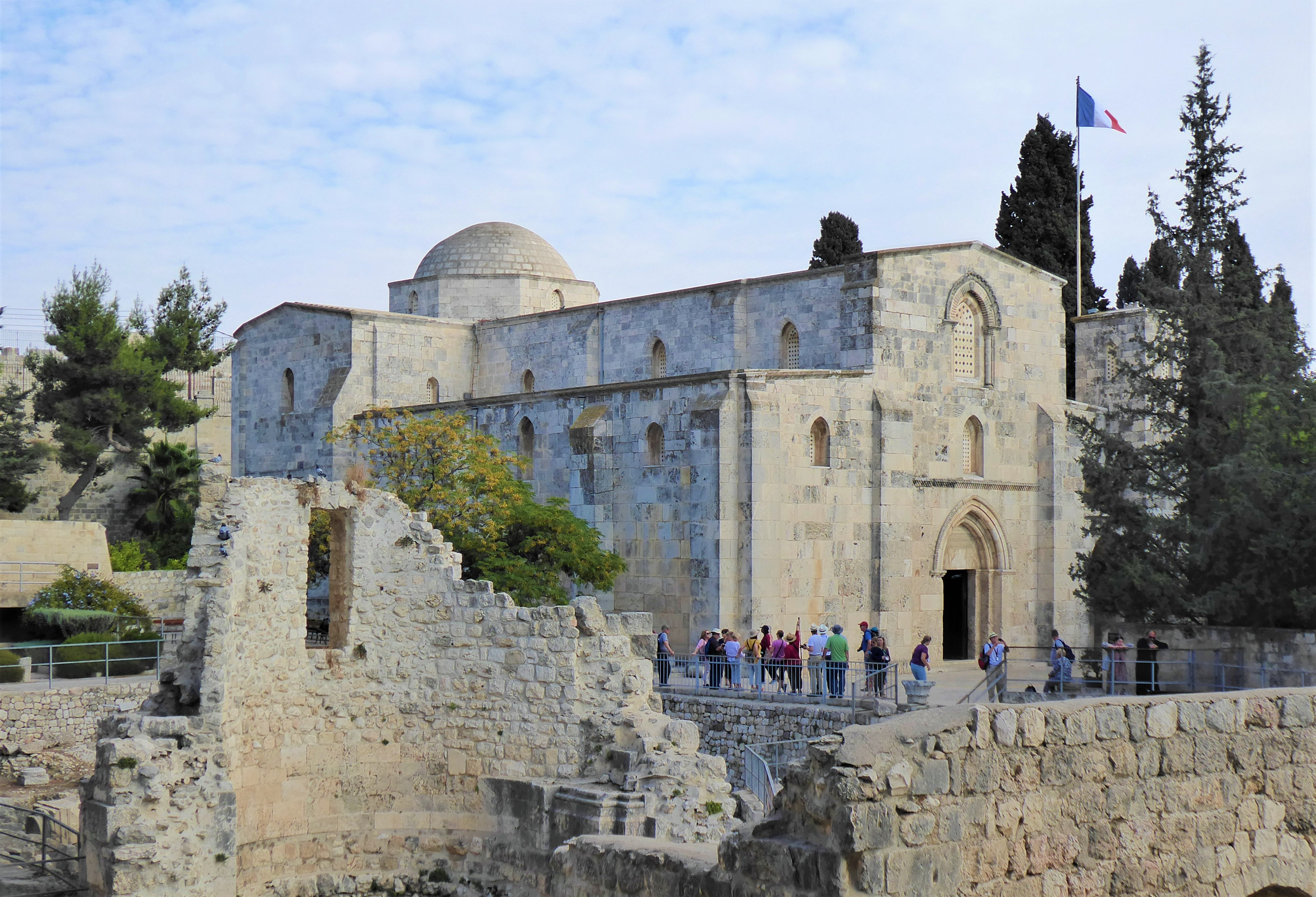
Church of Saint Anne in Old Jerusalem

Ioveta's mother, Queen Morphia, died shortly after 1126 or 1127. It is probably at this point that Ioveta was entrusted to the care of the nuns at the Convent of Saint Anne in Jerusalem. The girl may have been sent to Saint Anne's as a child oblate. After reaching an appropriate age in c. 1134, she took vows and became a nun herself.

Historians offer different explanations for Ioveta's religious profession. Yvonne Friedman, relying on Ernoul's account, believes that the rumors of sexual impropriety during her captivity rendered Ioveta unmarriageable in the eyes of her family. Erin Jordan notes that no medieval source, including Ernoul, suggests that there was any correlation between Ioveta's captivity and her becoming a nun. According to Ernoul's account, Baldwin intended that Ioveta too should marry, but she declared that she wished to be a nun instead. Barber proposes that Melisende, who had succeeded Baldwin upon his death in 1131, may have encouraged Ioveta to become a nun out of concern that Ioveta's status as purple-born might jeopardize Melisende's claim to the throne, but concedes that there is no way to know whether the decision was Ioveta's or Melisende's. In any case, this was a common path for the younger children of royal and noble parents; it demonstrated the family's piety and connected them to religious leaders, who exhibited significant influence.

== Abbess of Bethany ==
=== Construction at Bethany ===
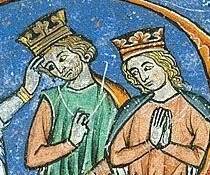
13th-century depiction of King Fulk and Queen Melisende, who established Ioveta's abbey

Ioveta's sister Queen Melisende was not content with Ioveta being a mere nun; as reported by the contemporary chronicler William of Tyre, she thought it "unseemly that the daughter of a king should be subject to some other mother in the cloister, just like one of the common people". The queen and her husband, King Fulk, persuaded the Latin patriarch of Jerusalem and the canons of the Church of the Holy Sepulchre to cede a church and land at Bethany, near Jerusalem, in 1138. The Convent of Saint Lazarus was erected there over the following six years.

Melisende lavishly endowed Bethany with estates, gold, silver, precious stones, and silk, making it wealthier than any other monastery or church in the kingdom. Ioveta quickly joined the new community. Because Ioveta was only about 18 in 1138, Melisende appointed an elderly abbess, Matilda, intending that Ioveta should succeed her. By 1144, Matilda had died and Ioveta had become abbess of one of the most significant abbeys in the kingdom.

=== Abbacy ===
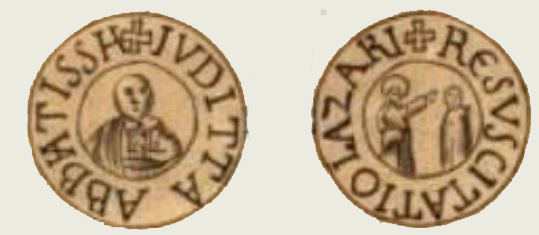
Reproduction (by Sebastiano Paoli) of the seal of "Ivditta abbatissa", depicted on the obverse veiled and holding a book with a cross; on the reverse, the resurrection of Lazarus

As abbess, Ioveta enjoyed more independence than her married sisters; although a queen, princess, and countess respectively, Melisende, Alice, and Hodierna were constrained in their exercise of power by their male relatives. Ioveta conducted transactions with other religious communities, such as Saint Anne's, Saint Mary Major's, and Saint Mary of the Valley of Jehosaphat's, as well as with the Knights Hospitaller. She maintained contact with foreign religious communities too, sending a piece of the True Cross to the Fontevraud Abbey in France. The authority she exercised was both spiritual and secular in nature, and Ioveta was one of the rare 12th-century women (especially in the East) to use her own seal; her only contemporary to do so was her sister the queen. Even more rarely did women have themselves depicted with books on their seals as Ioveta did, presumably to emphasize her piety and erudition.

Melisende reigned jointly with her son, Baldwin III, from Fulk's death in 1143 until Baldwin deposed her in 1153. She then moved to her fief of Nablus, close to Bethany and Ioveta, but remained an active and influential participant in state affairs. Reflecting Melisende's view of Ioveta's standing, Ioveta's abbey accepted exclusively noblewomen, but since there were few such candidates in the Latin East, pilgrims from Europe often supplemented their numbers. The most famous of these was Melisende's stepdaughter Countess Sibylla of Flanders, who arrived in 1157. Despite being her stepaunt, Ioveta was close to Sibylla in age. While her husband, Thierry, assisted Baldwin against Muslims, Sibylla stayed at Bethany and became so attached to Ioveta, the abbey, and the land that she decided to stay against her husband's wishes. That same year, Patriarch Fulcher died. Queen Melisende, Countess Sibylla, and one of King Baldwin III's aunts, either Countess Hodierna or Abbess Ioveta, intervened to secure the appointment of Amalric of Nesle to the vacant post.

=== Relations with family ===
In late 1160 or early 1161, Queen Melisende fell ill, likely having had a stroke. She suffered memory loss and was no longer able to participate in the administration of the kingdom. Hodierna and Ioveta nursed her until she died on 11 September 1161. Historian Hans Eberhard Mayer believes that Ioveta resented Melisende for committing her to a monastery life, citing Ioveta's failure to request prayers for Melisende from the nuns at Fontevraud, an argument Jordan finds "less than convincing ... in light of the plethora of evidence that suggests otherwise". Further deaths, of Countesses Hodierna and Sibylla in c. 1164 and 1165 respectively, left the abbess as the senior member of the royal family.

On 10 February 1163, King Baldwin III died too, and a younger nephew of Ioveta's, Amalric, succeeded him. King Amalric was forced to separate from his wife, Agnes of Courtenay, who soon remarried; shortly after he sent their daughter, Sibylla, to Bethany to be brought up by Ioveta. Sibylla stayed with her grandaunt for about ten years, awaiting marriage. Since Sibylla was then second in line to the throne, after the king's son, Baldwin, Jordan concludes that the royal family continued to hold Ioveta in high esteem even after Melisende's death. Baldwin IV became king upon Amalric's death in 1174, and Sibylla was expected to succeed him. As Sibylla's guardian, Ioveta occupied a position with the potential for significant authority until Sibylla left Bethany to marry William Longsword of Montferrat in 1176.

== Death and legacy ==
Abbess Ioveta died on 6 September 1178 and was succeeded by Abbess Eva. Ioveta may have been buried in Bethany, but the abbey was destroyed shortly after Saladin's conquest of Jerusalem and offers few archaeological clues about burials; the other potential resting place is Josaphat, where Queens Morphia and Melisende and other women of the royal family were buried.

Despite their significance, all four daughters of Baldwin II remain understudied in crusader scholarship, most of all Ioveta. Ernoul's account of sexual abuse during her time as hostage is given much prominence. She is normally mentioned only in passing and traditionally described as a reluctant nun without power or much contact with her family. Historian Erin Jordan argues against such a portrayal, emphasizing Ioveta's agency and influence.

== Sources ==
- Barber, Malcolm (2012). The Crusader States. Yale University Press. ISBN 978-0300189315.
- Hamilton, Bernard (1978). "Women in the Crusader States: The Queens of Jerusalem". In Derek Baker (ed.). Medieval Women. Ecclesiastical History Society.
- Hamilton, Bernard; Jotischky, Andrew (2020). Derek Baker (ed.). Latin and Greek Monasticism in the Crusader States. Cambridge University Press. ISBN 978-0521836388.
- Jordan, Erin L. (2017). "Hostage, Sister, Abbess: The Life of Iveta of Jerusalem". Medieval Prosopography. 32 (1): 66–86. JSTOR 26629994.
- Runciman, Steven (1952). A History of the Crusades: The Kingdom of Jerusalem and the Frankish East, 1100-1187. Vol. 2. Cambridge University Press. ISBN 0241298768.
