= Tomb of Lazarus =

Tomb near Jerusalem

Coordinates: 31°46′17.98″N 35°15′21.25″E

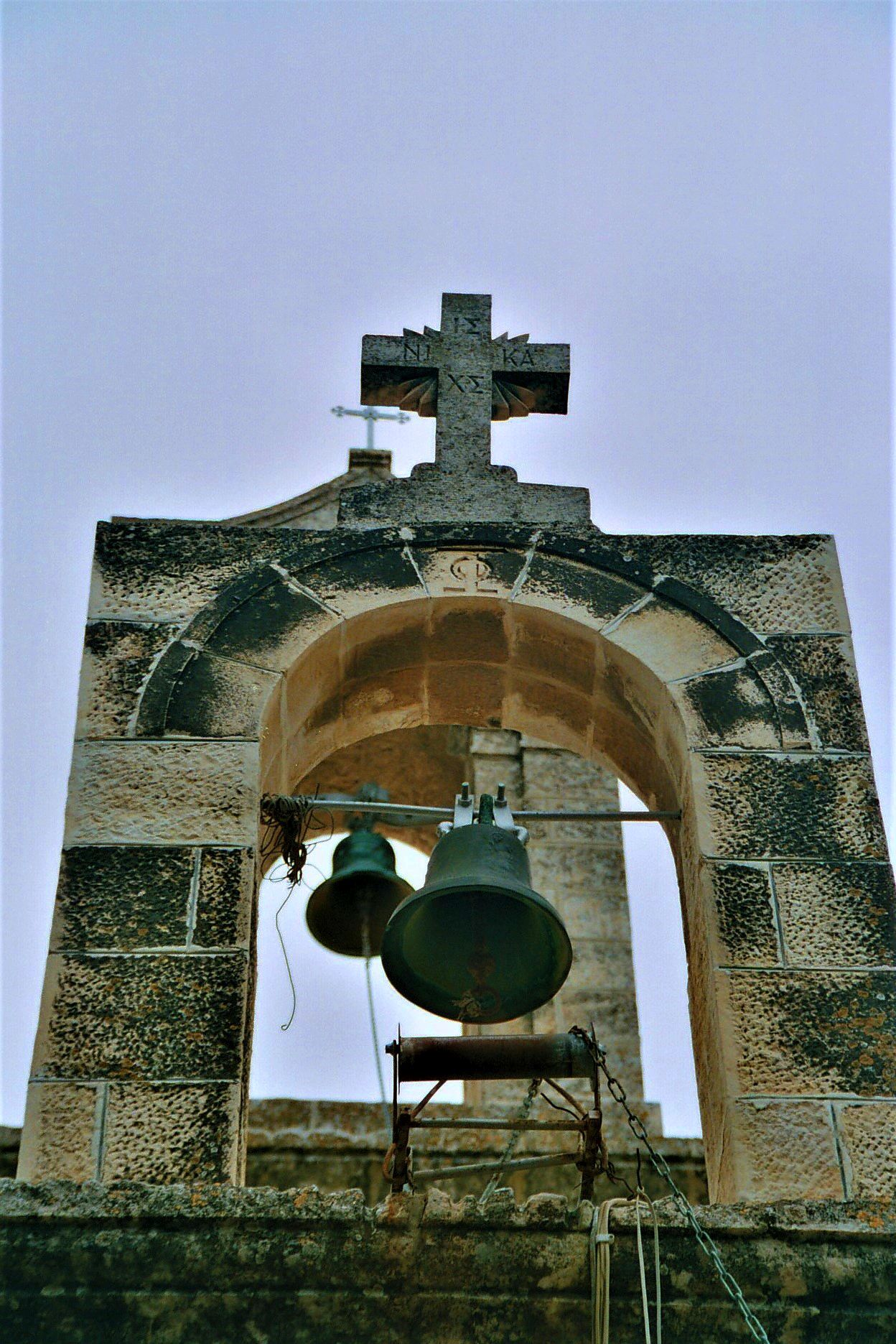
- The reputed tomb of Lazarus in Bethany

Religion
- Affiliation: Christian, Islamic
- Region: Middle East
- Ecclesiastical or organisational status: Mosque and Church

Location
- Location: Bethany, Quds Governorate, Palestine
- Interactive map of Tomb of Lazarus

The Tomb of Lazarus is a traditional Christian pilgrimage in the Bethany suburb of Quds Governorate, Palestine. It is located on the southeast slope of the Mount of Olives, some 2.4 km (1.5 miles) east of the city limits of Jerusalem. The tomb is the purported site of a miracle recorded in the Gospel of John in which Jesus raised Lazarus from the dead.

== History ==
The site, sacred to both Christians and Muslims, has been identified as the tomb of the gospel account since at least the 4th century AD. As the Catholic Encyclopedia of 1913 states, however, while it is "quite certain that the present village formed about the traditional tomb of Lazarus, which is in a cave in the village", the identification of this particular cave as the actual tomb of Lazarus is "merely possible; it has no strong intrinsic or extrinsic authority." Archeologists have established that the area was used as a cemetery in the 1st century AD, with tombs of this period found "a short distance north of the church."

Several Christian churches have existed at the site over the centuries. Since the 16th century, the site of the tomb has been occupied by the al-Uzair Mosque. The adjacent Roman Catholic Church of Saint Lazarus, built between 1952 and 1955 under the auspices of the Franciscan Order, stands upon the site of several much older ones. In 1965, a Greek Orthodox church was built just west of the tomb.

Lazarus Tomb Bethany

=== Historic church buildings at Bethany ===
There is no mention of a church at Bethany until the late 4th century AD, but both the historian Eusebius of Caesarea (c. 330) and the Bordeaux pilgrim in the Itinerarium Burdigalense (c. 333) do mention the tomb of Lazarus. The first mention of a church dedicated to Saint Lazarus, called the Lazarium, is by Jerome in 390. This is confirmed by the pilgrim Egeria in her Itinerary, where she recounts a liturgy celebrated there in about the year 410. Therefore, the church is thought to have been built between 333 and 390. Egeria noted, when the liturgy for Lazarus on the Saturday in the seventh week of Lent was performed, "so many people have gathered that they fill not only the Lazarium itself, but all the fields around."

The Lazarium consisted of the church (to the east of the site), the tomb of Lazarus (to the west), and an open space between the two which probably served as an atrium. The church was in the form of a three-aisle basilica. The apse, in a solid rectangular block shape, was at the east end. A sacristy on each side opened into the aisles.

The Lazarium was destroyed by an earthquake in the 6th century, and was replaced by a larger church. This church was mentioned by the Coptic Pope Theodosius I of Alexandria c. 518 and by the Frankish bishop Arculf in his narrative of the Holy Land c. 680. It survived intact until the Crusader era. The second church followed the same general plan as the first, but the apse was situated about 13 metres (43 ft) to the east in order to create a larger atrium. A chapel was built on the south side of the atrium.

In 1138, King Fulk and Queen Melisende obtained the village of Bethany from the Latin patriarch in exchange for land near Hebron. The queen built a large Benedictine convent to the south of the tomb and church. Melisende had extensive repairs made to the 6th-century Byzantine church, which remained the focal point of pilgrimages. For the use of the convent, the queen had a new church built over the tomb of St. Lazarus with a triapsidiole east end supported by barrel vaults (the largest of which would be used for the currently existing mosque). This new church was dedicated to St. Lazarus and the older church was reconsecrated to Sts. Mary and Martha. Melisende also fortified the complex with a tower.

After the fall of Jerusalem in 1187, the nuns of the convent went into exile. The new west church was most likely destroyed at this time, with only the tomb and barrel vaulting surviving. The 6th century church and tower were also heavily damaged at this time but remained standing. The village seems to have been abandoned thereafter, though a visitor in 1347 mentioned Greek monks attending the tomb chapel.

== The tomb ==
The entrance to the tomb today is via a flight of uneven rock-cut steps from the street. As it was described in 1896, there were twenty-four steps from the then-modern street level, leading to a square chamber serving as a place of prayer, from which more steps led to a lower chamber believed to be the tomb of Lazarus. The same description applies today.

The steps enter the antechamber (3.35 m long by 2.20 m wide) through the north wall; the outline of the former entrance via the mosque can still be seen on the east wall. The floor of the antechamber is two steps above the floor level of the mosque, possibly due to rock falls from the soft limestone ceiling during construction of the Crusader-era church above the tomb. The Crusaders strengthened the tomb itself with masonry, which obscures most of the original rock surface (except for a few holes). The alignment of the tomb and antechamber suggests they predate the Byzantine churches and may very well be from the time of Jesus.

Three steps connect the antechamber with the inner burial chamber (which measures a little more than two square metres in size). It contains three funerary niches (arcosolia), now mostly hidden by the Crusader masonry. One tradition places the tomb of Lazarus to the right of the entrance, which was formerly closed by a horizontal stone. Tradition also says that Jesus was standing in this antechamber when he called Lazarus from the grave.

== Current structures ==
=== Mosque of al-Uzair ===
Mosque of al-Uzair
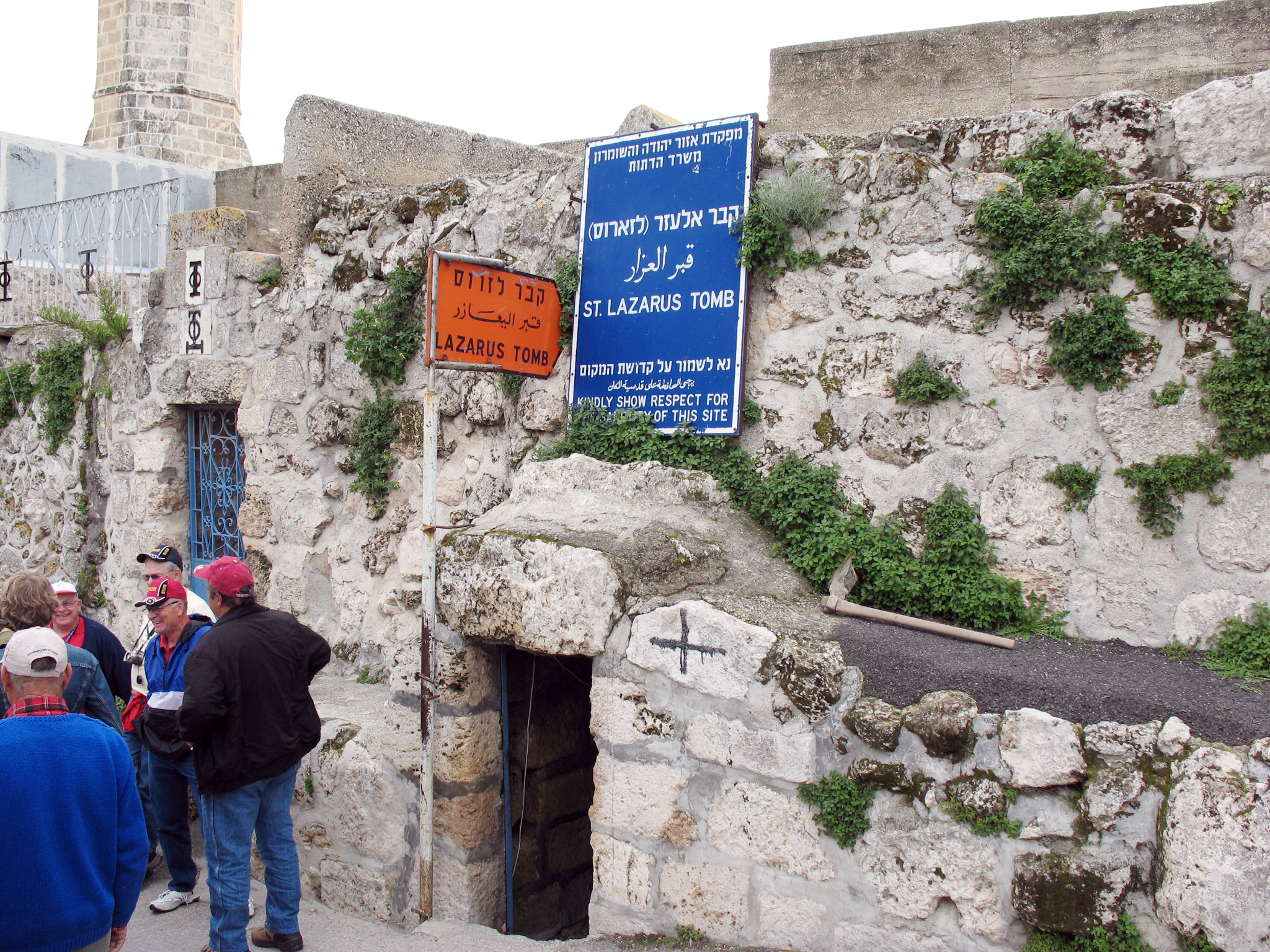

Religion
- Affiliation: Islam

Location
- Location: (Palestine) al-Eizariya, West Bank
- Interactive map of Mosque of al-Uzair

Architecture
- Completed: 16th Century

By 1384, a simple mosque had been built on the site of the existing structures. In the 16th century, the Ottomans built the larger al-Uzair Mosque to serve the town's (now Muslim) inhabitants and named it in honor of the town's patron saint, Lazarus of Bethany. The construction utilized the surviving barrel vaulting of the former west church. Its courtyard is in the Byzantine church atrium.

For 100 years after the mosque was constructed, Christians were invited to worship in it, but the practice was frowned upon by European church authorities who preferred for adherents of the faiths to remain separate. As Christian access to the tomb became more difficult, the Franciscans were eventually permitted (between 1566 and 1575) to cut a new entrance into the tomb on the north side. At some point the original entrance from the mosque was blocked. This entrance can still be seen in the east wall of the church's antechamber.

=== Catholic Church of Saint Lazarus ===
In 1863, the Franciscan Custody of the Holy Land gained title to a plot of ground close to the tomb of Lazarus. Other areas were acquired later. Between 1952 and 1955, a modern church dedicated to St. Lazarus was built on this property over the remnants of the former Byzantine and Crusader east churches. The courtyard of this church stands over the west end of the older churches. Parts of the original mosaic floor are still visible here. The west wall of the courtyard contains the west facade of the 6th century basilica, as well as its three doorways. About twenty-five metres up a hill northwest of the church is the modern entrance to the Tomb of Lazarus.

=== Greek Orthodox Church of Saint Lazarus ===
Church of Saint Lazarus
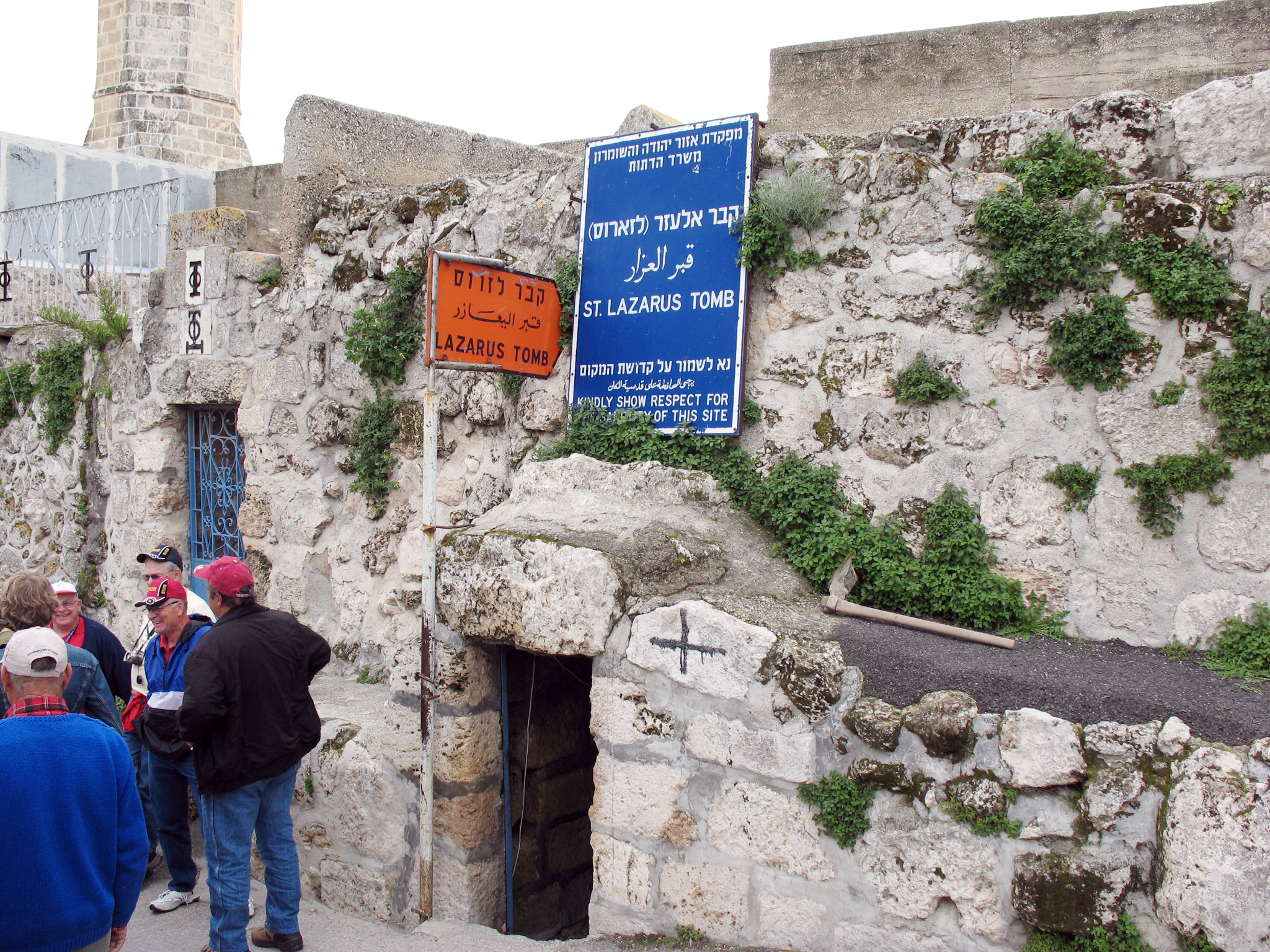

Religion
- Affiliation: Greek Orthodox

Location
- Location: (Palestine) al-Eizariya, West Bank
- Interactive map of Church of Saint Lazarus

Architecture
- Completed: 1965

In 1965, a modern Greek Orthodox church was built just west of the Tomb. Its construction incorporates the north wall of the former medieval Benedictine chapel. Near the church are ruins that belong to the Orthodox Patriarchate and are traditionally identified either as the House of Simon the Leper or Lazarus.

The nunnery there is officially known as the Convent, or Monastery, of Martha and Maria, named after the sisters of Lazarus.

== Gallery ==
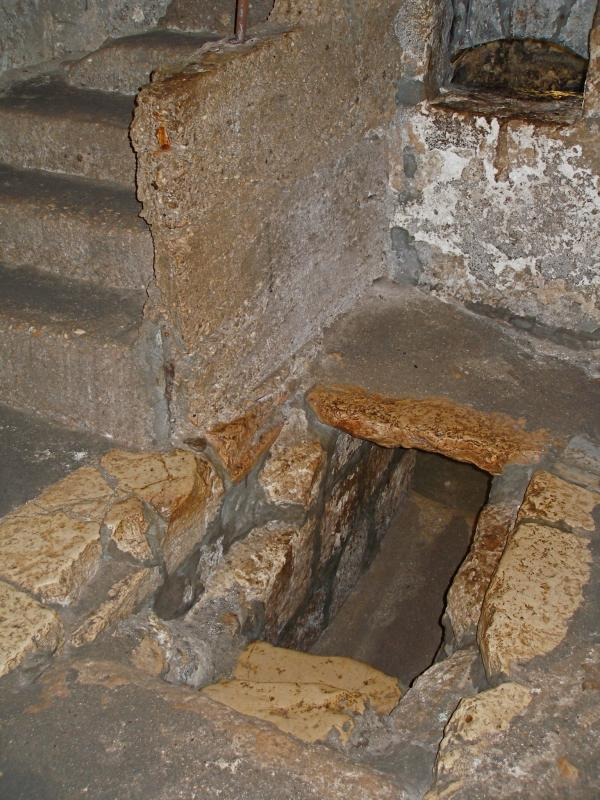
Burial Chamber Entrance

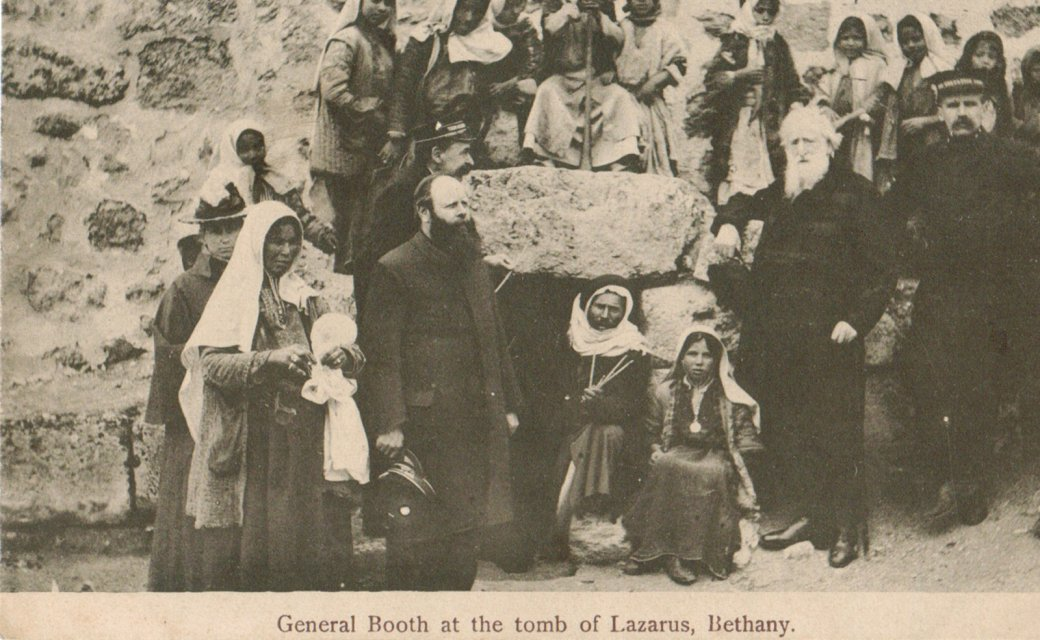
General William Booth and Commissioner John Lawley of The Salvation Army at the Tomb in 1905

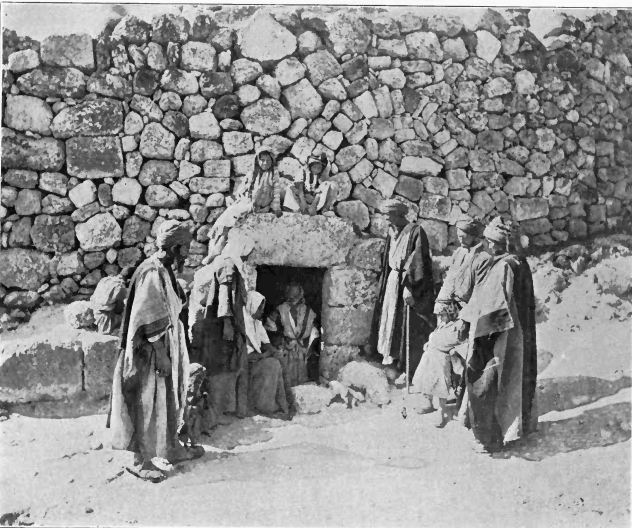
Tomb Entrance Circa 1906

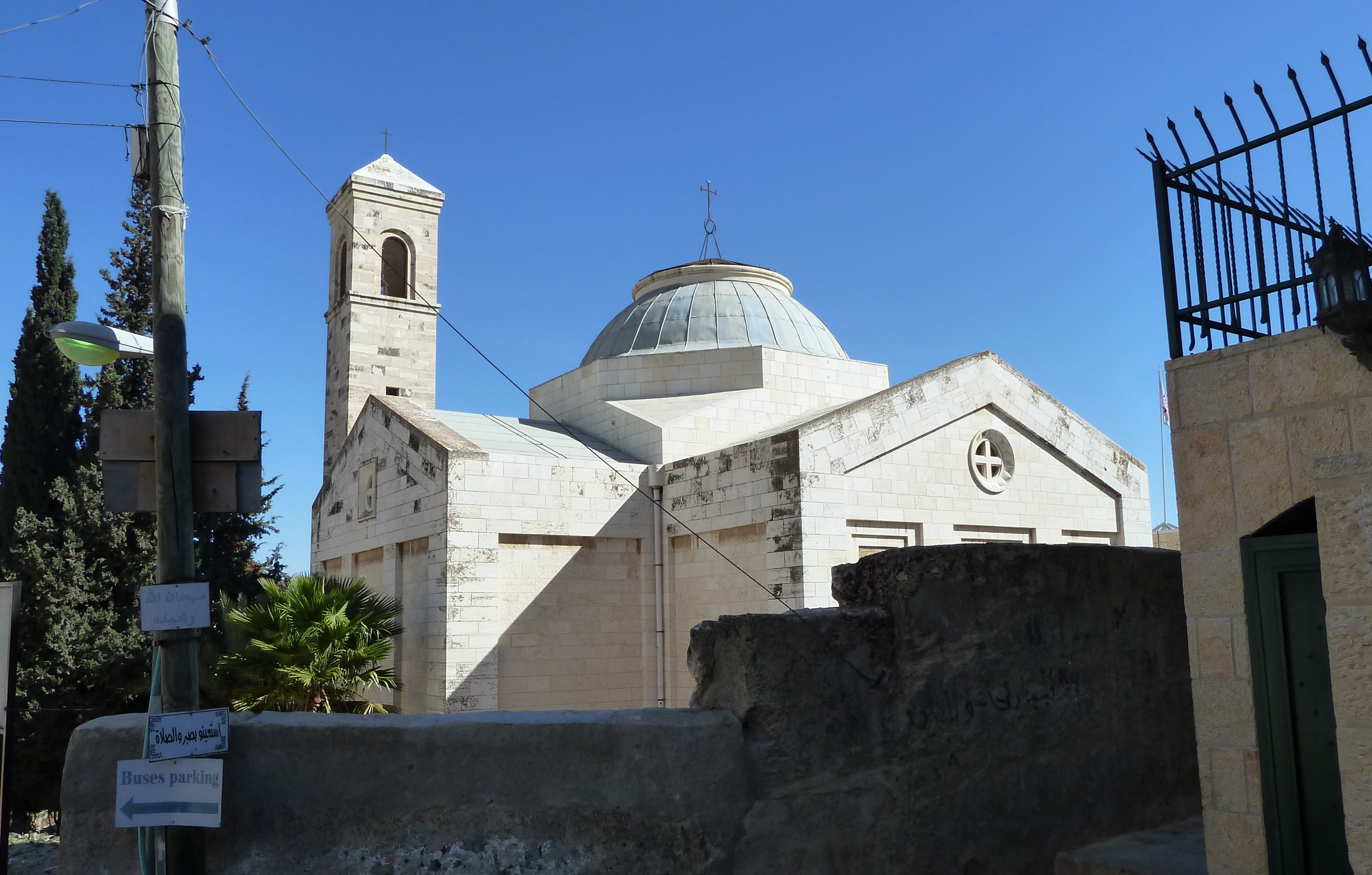
Roman Catholic Church

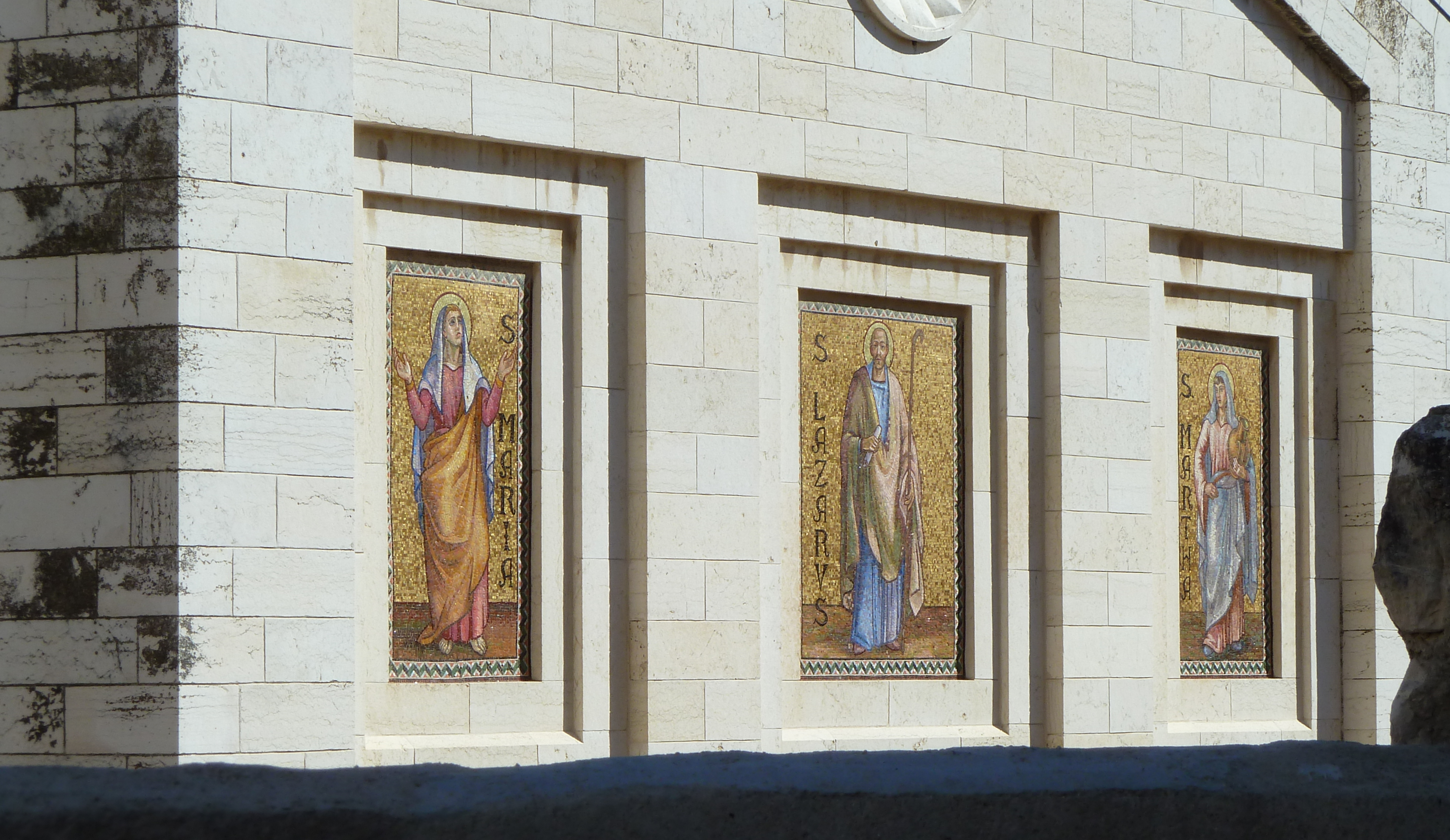
Catholic Church Mosaics

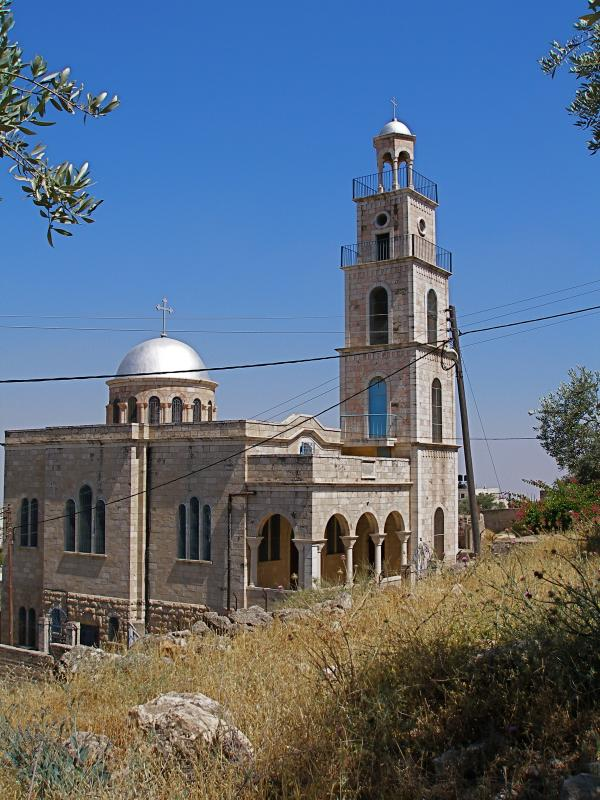
Greek Orthodox Church
