= Bethany =

Municipality type B in Jerusalem, Palestine

Bethany العيزرية (Arabic)
- Municipality type B

Arabic transcription(s)
  - Arabic: العيزرية
  - Latin: al-'Eizariya (official) al-Izzariya (unofficial)
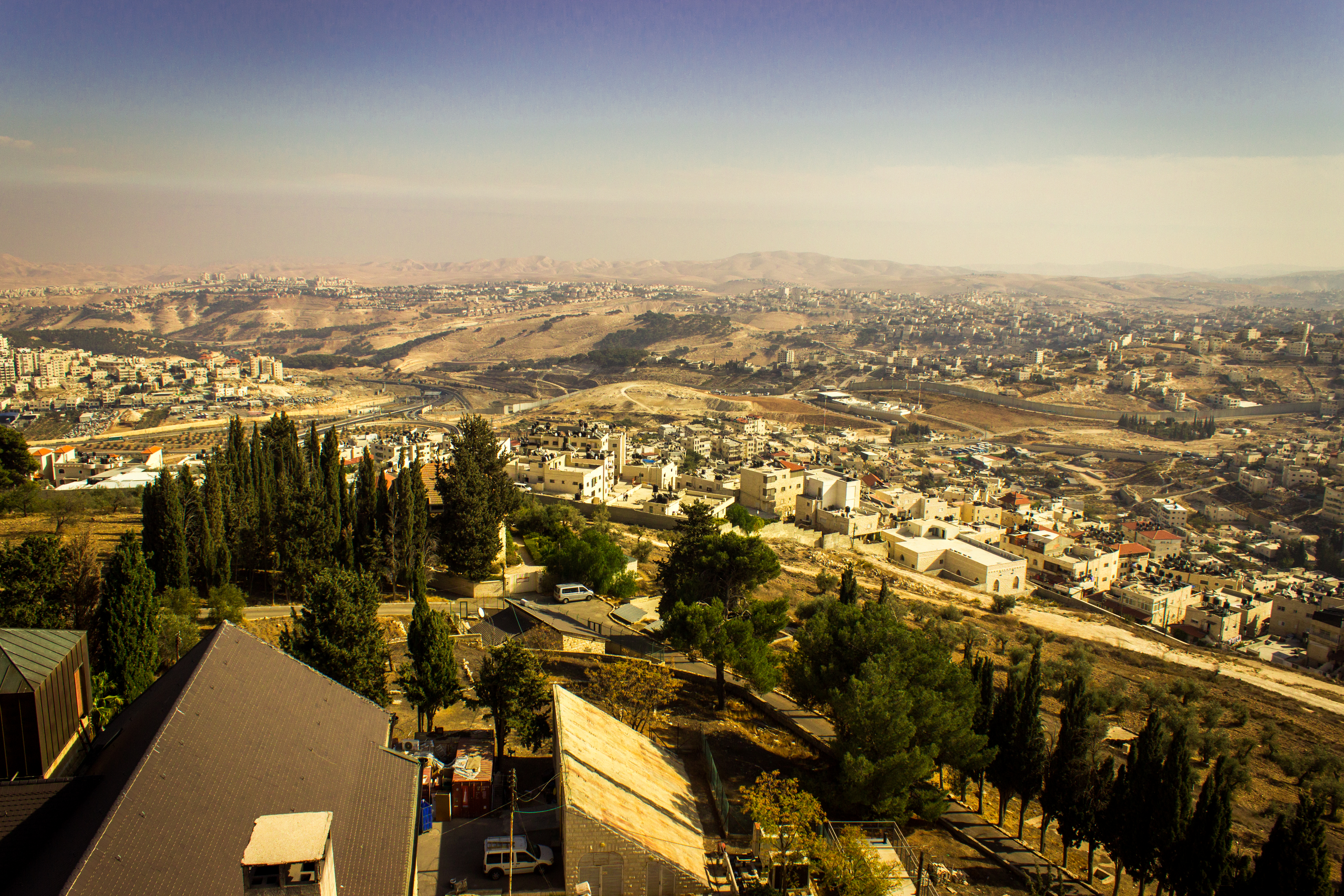
- Bethany, along with Ma'ale Adumim and Az-Za'ayyem

- Location of Bethany within Palestine
- Coordinates: 31°46′12″N 35°15′52″E
- Palestine grid: 174/130
- Country: Palestine
- Governorate: Quds

Government
  - Type: Municipality
  - Head of Municipality: Khalil Abu Rish

Population (2017)
  - Total: 21,175
- Name meaning: "The place of Lazarus"

Bethany (Ancient Greek: Βηθανία, Syriac: ܒܝܬ ܥܢܝܐ Bēṯ ʿAnyā), locally called in Arabic al-Eizariya or el-Aizariya (Arabic: العيزرية, "[place] of Lazarus"), is a Palestinian town in the Jerusalem Governorate of Palestine, bordering East Jerusalem, in the West Bank. The name al-Eizariya refers to the New Testament figure Lazarus of Bethany, who according to the Gospel of John, was raised from the dead by Jesus in the town. The traditional site of the miracle, the Tomb of Lazarus, in the city is a place of pilgrimage.

The town is located on the southeastern slope of the Mount of Olives, less than 2 miles (3.2 km) from Jerusalem. With a population of 22,928 inhabitants according to the Palestinian Central Bureau of Statistics, it is the second largest city in the Quds Governorate of the State of Palestine, after only East Jerusalem, which has been annexed by and is completely under the control of Israel, although this annexation is unrecognized internationally.

== Name ==
=== Al-Eizariya ===
The name Al-Eizariya (Arabic: العيزرية) means "place of Lazarus". In his 1840 work Biblical Researches in Palestine, Edward Robinson wrote: "The Arab name of the village is el-'Aziriyeh, from el-'Azir, the Arabic form of Lazarus. The name "Bethany" is unknown among the native inhabitants. Yet, there is no reason to question the identity of the place" with the Biblical Bethany.

=== Bethany ===
The root meaning and origin of the name Bethany has been the subject of much scholarship and debate. William Hepworth Dixon devotes a multi-page footnote to it in his The Holy Land (1866), largely devoted to debunking the meaning "house of dates", which is attributed to Joseph Barber Lightfoot by way of a series of careless interpretative mistakes. Dixon quotes Emanuel Deutsch of the British Museum, who suggests a non-Hebrew root transcribed in Syriac script whose meaning he gives as "House of Misery" or "Poor-house".

This theory as to Bethany's etymology, which was eventually also adopted by Gustaf Dalman in 1905, is not without challengers. For example, E. Nestle's Philologica Sacra (1896) suggests that Bethany is derived from the personal name Anaiah, while others have suggested it is a shortened version of Ananiah, a village of Bethel mentioned in the Book of Nehemiah (Nehemiah 11:32). Since Greek can neither reproduce an /h/ sound nor the harsh /ħ/ sound (Hebrew Ḥet) in the middle of a word, a derivation from the personal name Chananya ("YHWH has been gracious") is also possible.

Another suggestion, arising from the presence of nearby Bethphage ("house of unripe figs"), is that its name comes from Beit Hini, (Imperial Aramaic: בית היני / ביתייני / ביתוני / בית וני / בית ואני / בית אוני / ביתיוני / בית הינו), possibly meaning "house of figs", which location Talmudic texts place near Jerusalem. Some translations suggest it is Bethany.

Deutsch's thesis, however, seems to also be attested to by Jerome. In his version of Eusebius' Onomasticon, the meaning of Bethany is defined as domus adflictionis or "House of affliction". Brian J. Capper writes that this is a Latin derivation from the Hebrew beth 'ani, or more likely the Aramaic beth 'anya, both of which mean "House of the poor" or "house of affliction/poverty", also semantically speaking "poor-house". Capper concludes, from historical sources as well as this linguistic evidence, that Bethany may have been the site of an almshouse.

According to Capper and Deutsch before him, there are also linguistic difficulties that arise when the Anaiah/Ananiah, "house of figs" or "house of dates" theses are compared against the bethania form used in Greek versions of the New Testament. Additionally, the Aramaic beit 'anya (ܒܝܬ ܥܢܝܐ) is the form used for Bethany in Christian Palestinian and Syriac versions of the New Testament. Given this, and Jerome's familiarity with Semitic philology and the immediate region, Capper concludes that the "house of affliction"/"poor-house" meaning as documented by Jerome and in the Syriac New Testament usage is correct, and that this meaning relates to the use of the village as a centre for caring for the sick and aiding the destitute and pilgrims to Jerusalem.

It may be possible to combine the Ananiah (as a personal name) and "house of the poor" derivations, since the shortening of Ananiah ("Yah has intervened") to Anya is conceivable though unattested (cf. the common shortening of Yochanan [and perhaps also Chananyah?] to Choni), whence a typical Semitic wordplay might arise between Anya as a shortening of the personal name within the name of the village and as Aramaic for "poor". Such a wordplay may have served the choice of the village as the location for an almshouse.

== History ==
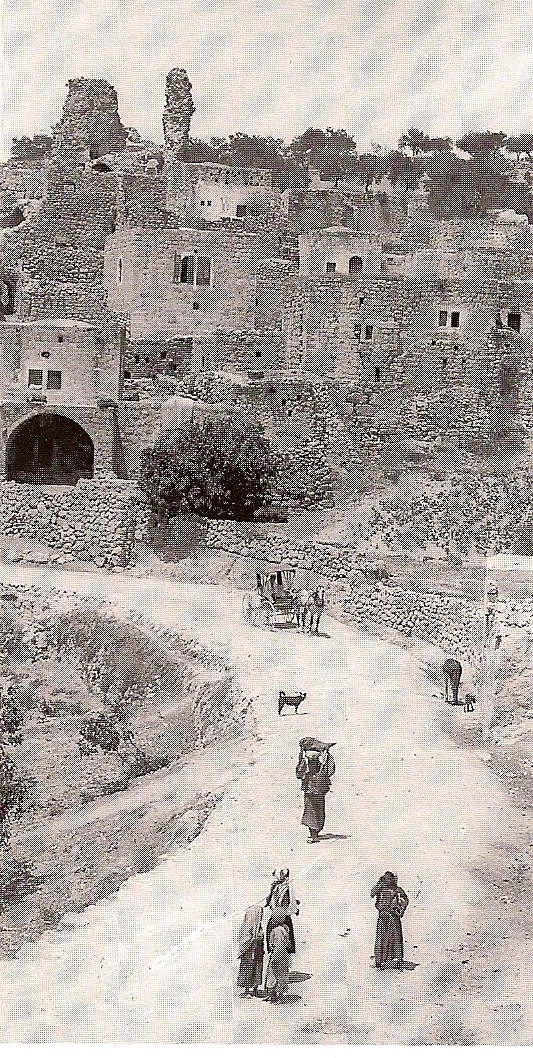
Al-Eizariya at the start of the 20th century

=== Antiquity ===
The site is believed to have been continuously inhabited from the 6th century BCE. In 1923–1924, American archaeologist William F. Albright identified the village with Ananiah (or 'Ananyab); however, Edward Robinson and others have identified Ananiah with present-day Beit Hanina.

According to the Catholic Encyclopedia of 1913, there have been scholars who questioned whether al-Eizariya was the actual site of the ancient village of Bethany:

Some believe that the present village of Bethany does not occupy the site of the ancient village; but that it grew up around the traditional cave which they suppose to have been at some distance from the house of Martha and Mary in the village; [Domenico] Zanecchia (La Palestine d'aujourd'hui, 1899, I, 445f.) places the site of the ancient village of Bethany higher up on the southeastern slope of the Mount of Olives, not far from the accepted site of Bethphage, and near that of the Ascension. It is quite certain that the present village formed about the traditional tomb of Lazarus, which is in a cave in the village... The site of the ancient village may not precisely coincide with the present one, but there is every reason to believe that it was in this general location."

=== New Testament ===
Bethany is recorded in the New Testament as a small village in Judaea, the home of the siblings Mary of Bethany, Martha, and Lazarus, as well as that of Simon the Leper. Jesus is reported to have lodged there after his entry into Jerusalem. The village is referenced in relation to six incidents:

- The interrogation of John the Baptist by the priests and Levites sent by the Pharisees: John 1:19-34
- The raising of Lazarus from the dead: John 11:1-46
- The return of Jesus to Judaea, after sojourning in a "region near the wilderness, to a village called Ephraim, where he stayed with his disciples". The Gospel of John reports that "Six days before the Passover, Jesus came to Bethany, where Lazarus lived, whom Jesus had raised from the dead."
- The entry of Jesus into Jerusalem on Palm Sunday, which Jesus begins near Bethany: Mark 11:1 and Luke 19:29
- The lodging of Jesus in Bethany during the following week: Matthew 21:17 and Mark 11:11-12
- The dinner in the house of Simon the Leper, at which Jesus was anointed: Matthew 26:6-13, Mark 14:3-9, and John 12:1-8
- Before the Ascension of Jesus into heaven: Luke 24:50

In Luke 10:38-42, a visit of Jesus to the home of Mary and Martha is described, but the village of Bethany is not named (nor whether Jesus is even in the vicinity of Jerusalem).

=== Crusader era ===
The Crusaders called al-Eizariya by its Biblical name Bethany. In 1138, Fulk, King of Jerusalem and Melisende, Queen of Jerusalem, purchased the village from the Latin Patriarch of Jerusalem in exchange for land near Hebron. The queen founded a large Benedictine abbey dedicated to Mary of Bethany and Martha near the Tomb of Lazarus. Melisende's sister Ioveta, thenceforward "of Bethany," was one of the first abbesses. Melisende died there in 1163; her stepdaughter, Sibylla of Anjou, also died there in 1165. Melisende's granddaughter Sibylla, also later Queen of Jerusalem, was raised in the abbey. After the fall of Jerusalem in 1187, the nuns of the convent went into exile. The village seems to have been abandoned thereafter, though a visitor in 1347 mentioned Greek Orthodox monks attending the tomb chapel.

Yaqut al-Hamawi (d. 1229) described it as "A village near Jerusalem. There is here the tomb of Al Azar (Lazarus), whom Isa (Jesus) brought to life from being dead."

=== Mamluk era ===
In the 1480s, during the Mamluk period, Felix Fabri visited and described different places in the village, including a "house and storehouse" of Maria Magdalen, the house of Martha, the church of the sepulchre of Lazarus, and the house of Simon the Leper. He described the village as being "well-peopled", with the inhabitants being saracen.

=== Ottoman era ===
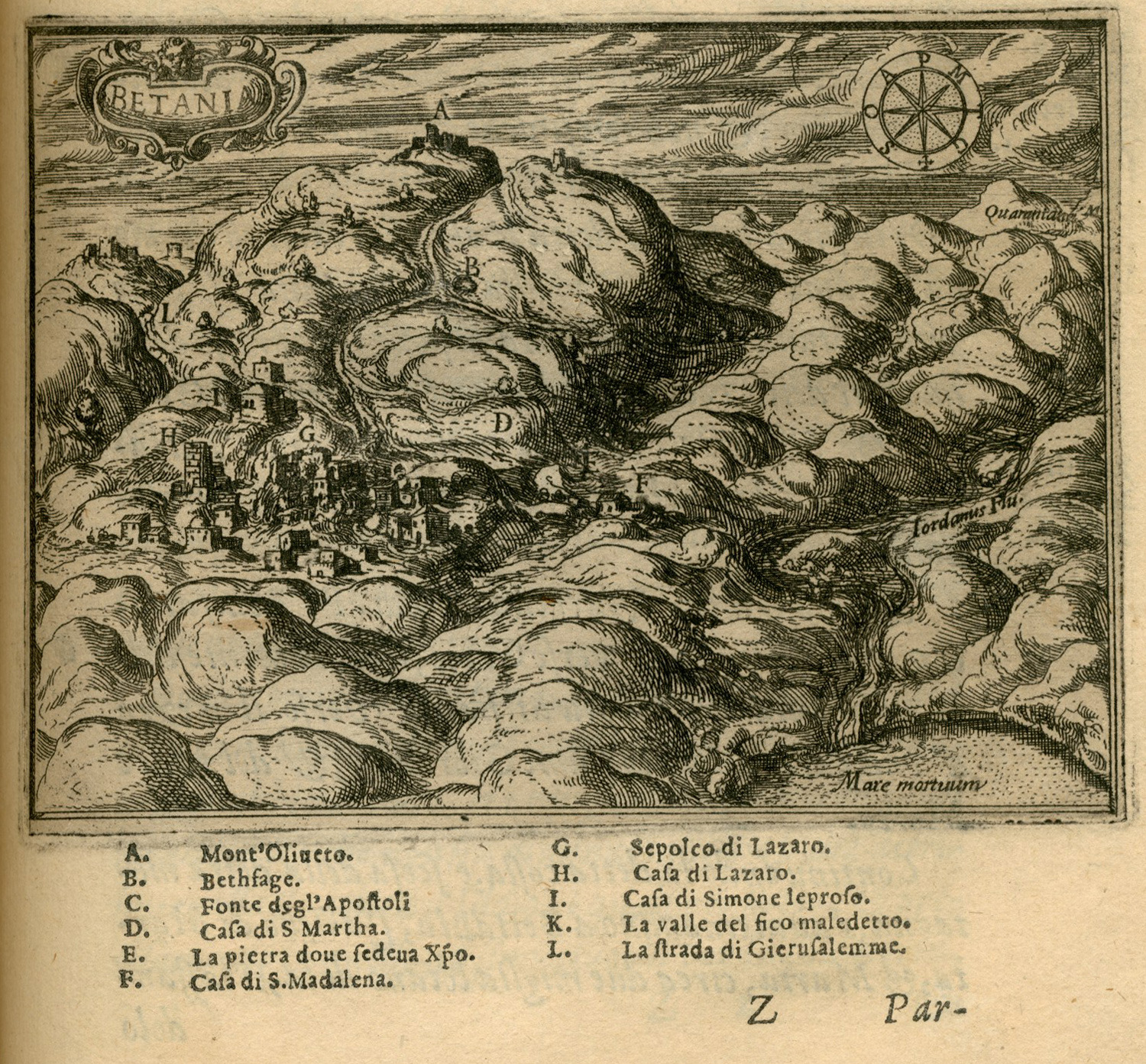
al-Eizariya, depicted in 1587, by Zuallart

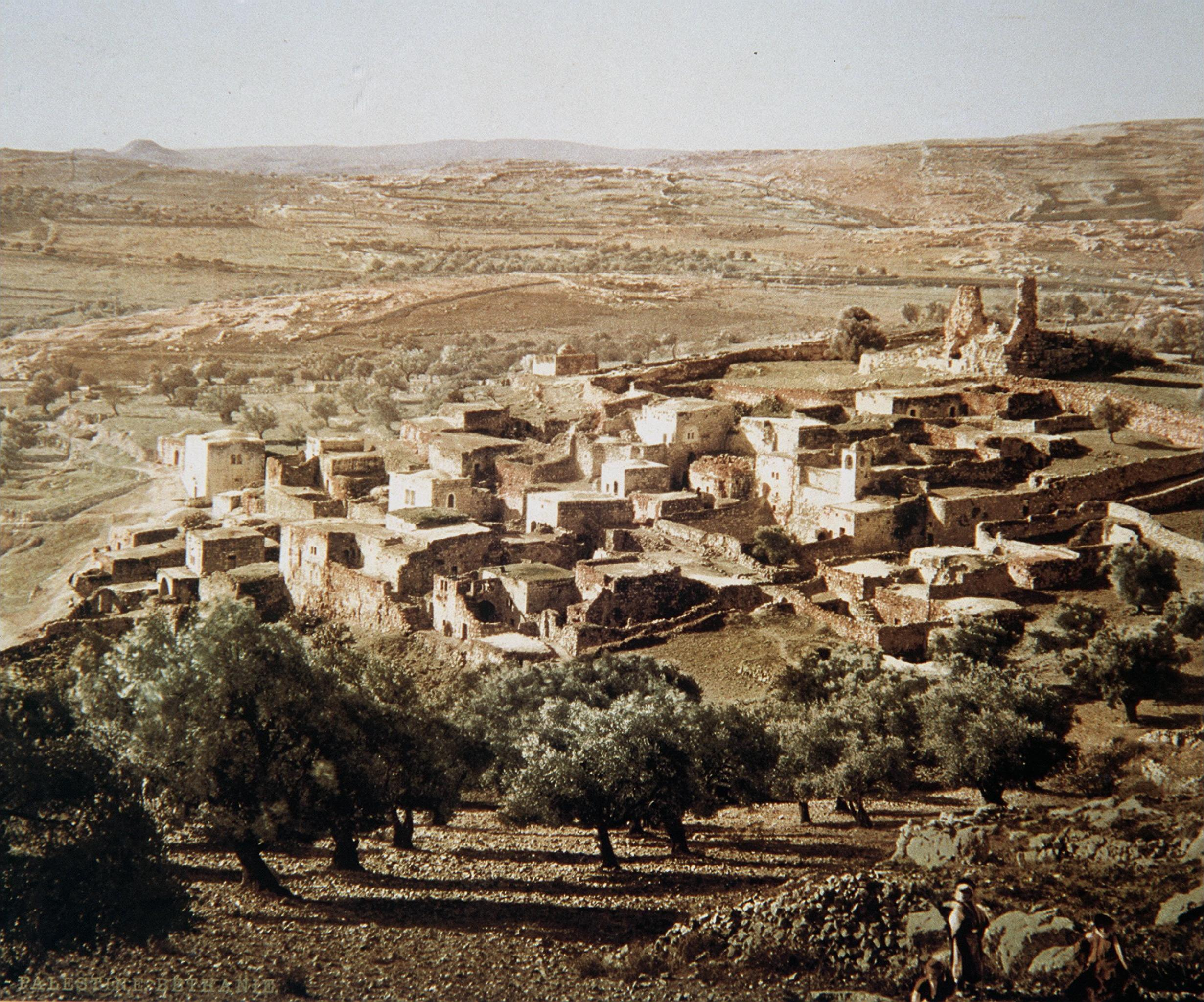
Colorized picture of Al-Eizariya, taken by Félix Bonfils, c. 1890

In 1517, the village was included in the Ottoman Empire with the rest of Palestine, and in the 1596 tax-records it appeared as 'Ayzariyya, located in the Nahiya of Jabal Quds of the Liwa of Al-Quds. The population was 67 households, all Muslim. They paid taxes on wheat, barley, vineyards and fruit trees, occasional revenues, goats and beehives; a total of 14,000 Akçe.

The Ottomans built the al-Uzair Mosque and named it in honor of Lazarus, who is revered by both Christians and Muslims. For 100 years after it was constructed, Christians were invited to worship in it, but the practice was frowned upon by European church authorities who preferred that adherents of both faiths remain separate.

In 1838, Edward Robinson visited, and described it as a poor village of some 20 families. It was also noted as a Muslim village, located in the el-Wadiyeh region, east of Jerusalem.

In 1870, the French explorer Victor Guérin visited the village. Socin found that al-Eizariya had a population of 113, with a total of 36 houses, from an official Ottoman village list from about the same year. The population count included men only. Hartmann found that the village had 35 houses.

In 1883, the PEF's Survey of Western Palestine described the village (named El Aziriyeh), as being on the side of a hill, with a ravine running down on the east side of it. The houses were built of stone. The village was dominated by the remains of a Crusader building. A mosque with a white dome was built over what was traditionally the tomb of Lazarus. A second small mosque, dedicated to a Sheik Ahmed, was located to the south of the village.

Around 1890, Khalil Aburish, whose ancestors had officially been designated "guardians of the holy resting place of Lazarus", began promoting al-Eizariya as a tourist or pilgrimage destination.

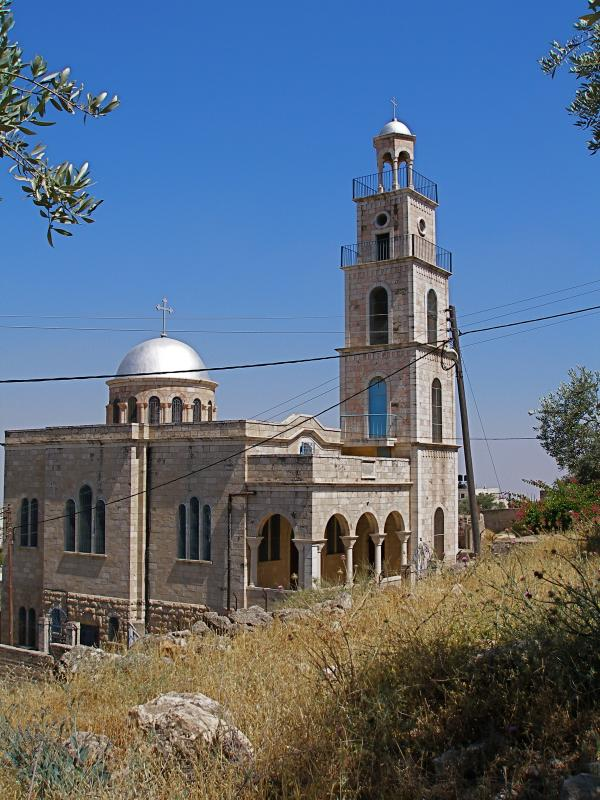
Greek Orthodox church, al-Eizariya

In 1896 the population of El-'azarije was estimated to be about 315 persons.

In the early 20th century, visitors counted 40 family dwellings in the village. In 1917, it had about 400 residents.

=== British Mandate era ===
In the 1922 census of Palestine conducted by the British Mandate authorities, the village had a population of 506 Muslims and 9 Christians, where 2 of the Christians were Orthodox, and 7 Roman Catholics. In the 1931 census of Palestine this had increased to 726 persons, 715 Muslims and 11 Christians, in 152 houses. The number included members of a Greek Convent.

In the 1945 statistics, the population was 1,060; 1,040 Muslims and 20 Christians, while the total land area was 11,179 dunams, according to an official land and population survey. Of this, 43 were allocated for plantations and irrigable land, 3,359 for cereals, while 102 dunams were classified as built-up (urban) areas.

=== Jordanian era ===
During the 1948 Arab–Israeli War, and through the years 1948–1967, the site was controlled by Jordan.

In 1961, the population of the area was 3,308.

=== 1967, aftermath ===
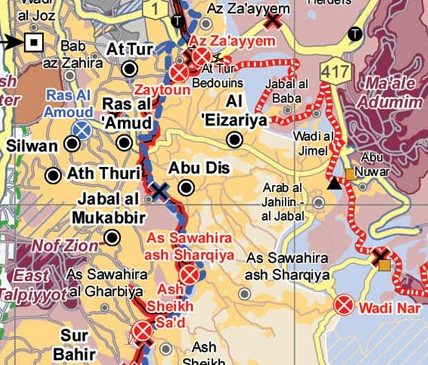
Today Bethany (Al Eizariya) is in a Palestinian enclave, surrounded by the Israeli West Bank barrier to the north, east and west. It borders the town of Abu Dis to the south; the enclave continues until Bethlehem.

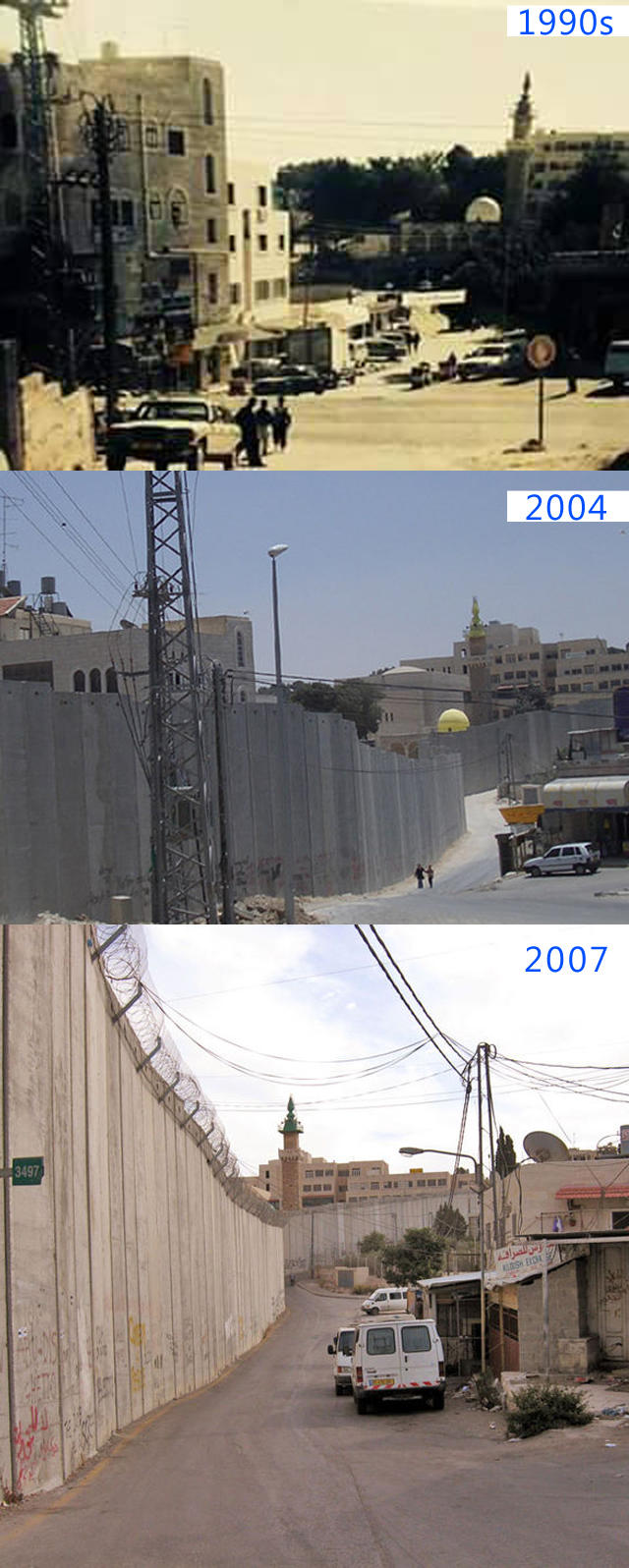
Israeli separation barrier at Abu Dis & Al-Eizariya, 1990s- 2004–2007. This shows a portion of the barrier built by Israel in the West Bank. This part is very close to the eastern part of Jerusalem, ~2 km from al-Aqsa Mosque. It is taken on the Israeli side of the wall, facing south. The local residents on both sides of the barrier at this point consist of predominantly Palestinians Families.

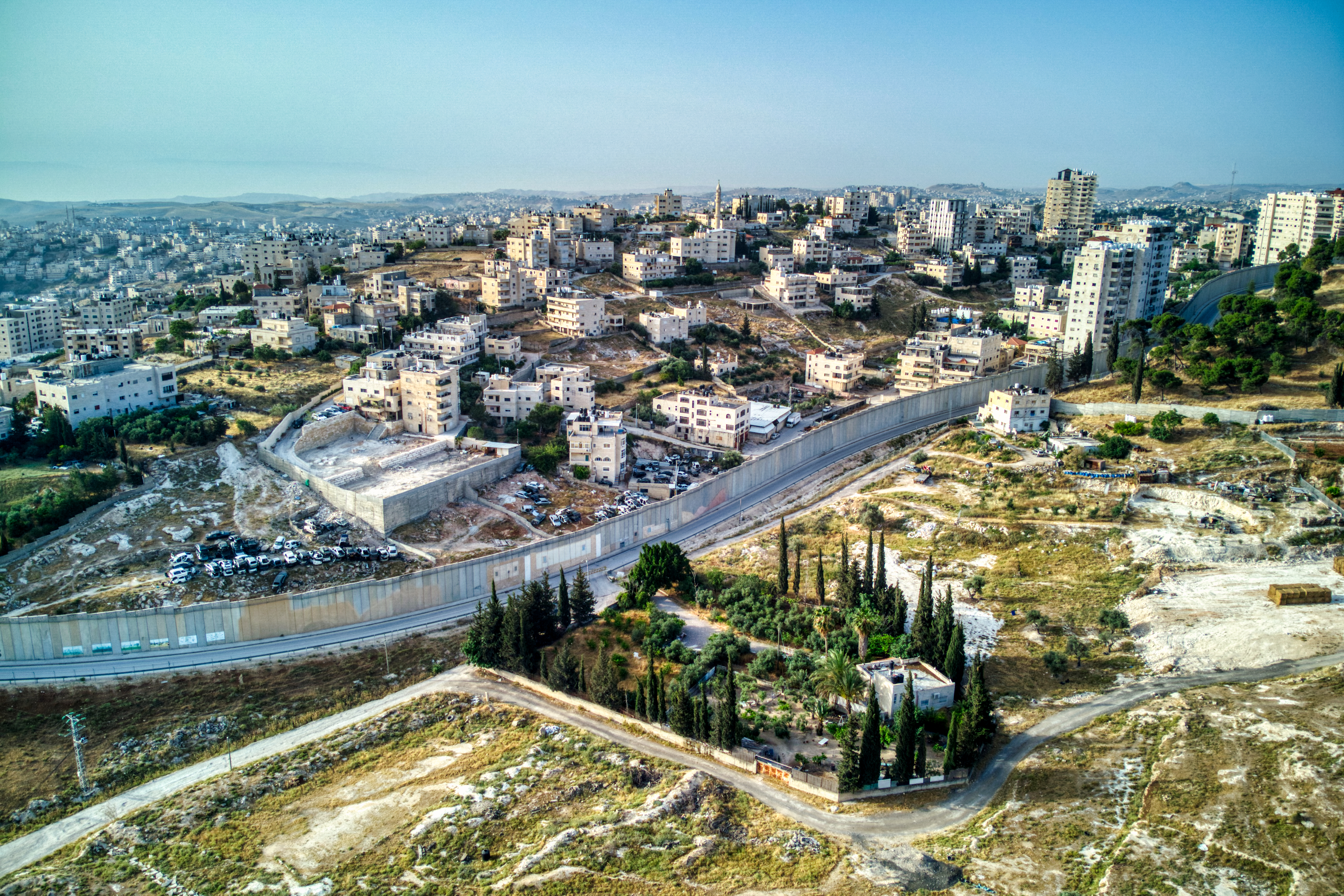
Al-Eizariya beyond the Israeli separation barrier - a look from At-Tur

Since the Six-Day War in 1967, Bethany has been occupied by Israel, and lands to the east of the village were declared a closed military zone, cutting farmers off from the lentils and wheat crops they cultivated on the hilltops where Maaleh Adumim was later established.

Today, the town is overcrowded due to rapid population growth and a lack of town planning. Much of the agricultural land that produced figs, almonds, olives and carob has been confiscated or cut down by Israeli authorities, or has been absorbed into the expanding built-up area of Al-Eizariya.

After the 1995 accords, 87.3% of Al-Eizariya land was classified as Area C and the remaining 12.7% as Area B. Israel has confiscated land from Al-Eizariya in order to build two Israeli settlements:

- 4,217 dunams for Ma'ale Adummim,
- 2,749 dunams for Mishor Adummim (Industrial Center).

Many of the original inhabitants now live in Jordan, the United States, and the Arab states of the Persian Gulf. Real estate speculation and the opening of many bank branches briefly accompanied expectations that the Palestinian Authority would set up its seat of government in East Jerusalem. In 2000, about a quarter of the population, then 16,000, held Israeli ID cards.

In 2004, the Israeli West Bank barrier was built across Bethany's main road, curtailing the commerce in the strip of shops along the road, which drew both Arab and Jewish customers.

== Archaeology ==
Archaeological excavations between 1949 and 1953, directed by Father Sylvester J. Saller for the Franciscans of the Holy Land, revealed details of the previous Christian places of worship erected near the tomb. Four superimposed churches were discovered to the east of Lazarus's tomb, the earliest dated to the 4th or 5th century. Rock-cut tombs and the remains of houses, wine-presses, cisterns and silos were also unearthed. Pottery finds were dated to the Persian and Hellenistic periods. There are ongoing excavations at a site just beyond the House of Martha and Mary.

== Landmarks ==
=== Tomb of Lazarus ===
The Tomb of Lazarus in Bethany is a traditional pilgrimage destination. The tomb is the purported site of the miracle recorded in the Gospel of John in which Jesus raises Lazarus of Bethany from the dead. The site, sacred to both Christians and Muslims, has been identified as the tomb of the gospel account since at least the 3rd century CE. As the Catholic Encyclopedia of 1913 states, however, "It is quite certain that the present village formed about the traditional tomb of Lazarus, which is in a cave in the village. The identification of this [particular] cave as the tomb of Lazarus is merely possible; it has no strong intrinsic or extrinsic authority."

The tomb has been identified as the tomb of the gospel account since at least the 4th century AD. Both the historian Eusebius of Caesarea (c. 330) and the Itinerarium Burdigalense (c. 333) mention the Tomb of Lazarus in this location. Several Christian churches have existed at the site over the centuries. The first mention of a church is in the late 4th century, although Eusebius of Caesarea and the Bordeaux pilgrim mention the tomb. In 390, Jerome writes of a church dedicated to Saint Lazarus called the Lazarium. This is repeated by the pilgrim Egeria around 384. The present-day gardens contain the remnants of a mosaic floor from the 4th-century church.

In 1143, the existing structure and lands were purchased by King Fulk and Queen Melisende of Jerusalem and a large Benedictine convent dedicated to Mary and Martha was built near the tomb of Lazarus. After the fall of Jerusalem in 1187, the convent was deserted and fell into ruin with only the tomb and barrel vaulting surviving. By 1384, a simple mosque had been built on the site. In the 16th century, the Ottomans built the larger al-Uzair Mosque to serve the town's (now Muslim) inhabitants and named it in honor of the town's patron saint, Lazarus of Bethany. Since the 16th century, the site of the tomb has been occupied by the al-Uzair Mosque. The adjacent Roman Catholic Church of Saint Lazarus, built between 1952 and 1955 under the auspices of the Franciscan Order, stands upon the site of several much older ones. In 1965, a Greek Orthodox church was built just west of the tomb.

The entrance to the tomb today is via a flight of uneven rock-cut steps from the street. As it was described in 1896, there were twenty-four steps from the then-modern street level, leading to a square chamber serving as a place of prayer, from which more steps led to a lower chamber believed to be the tomb of Lazarus. The same description applies today.

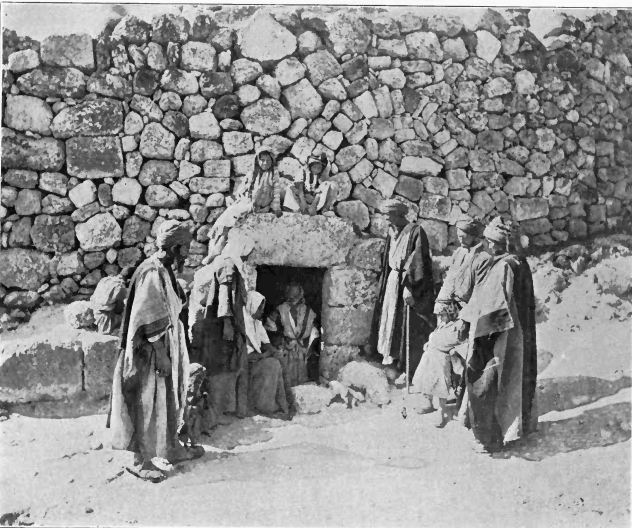
Tomb of Lazarus, 1906

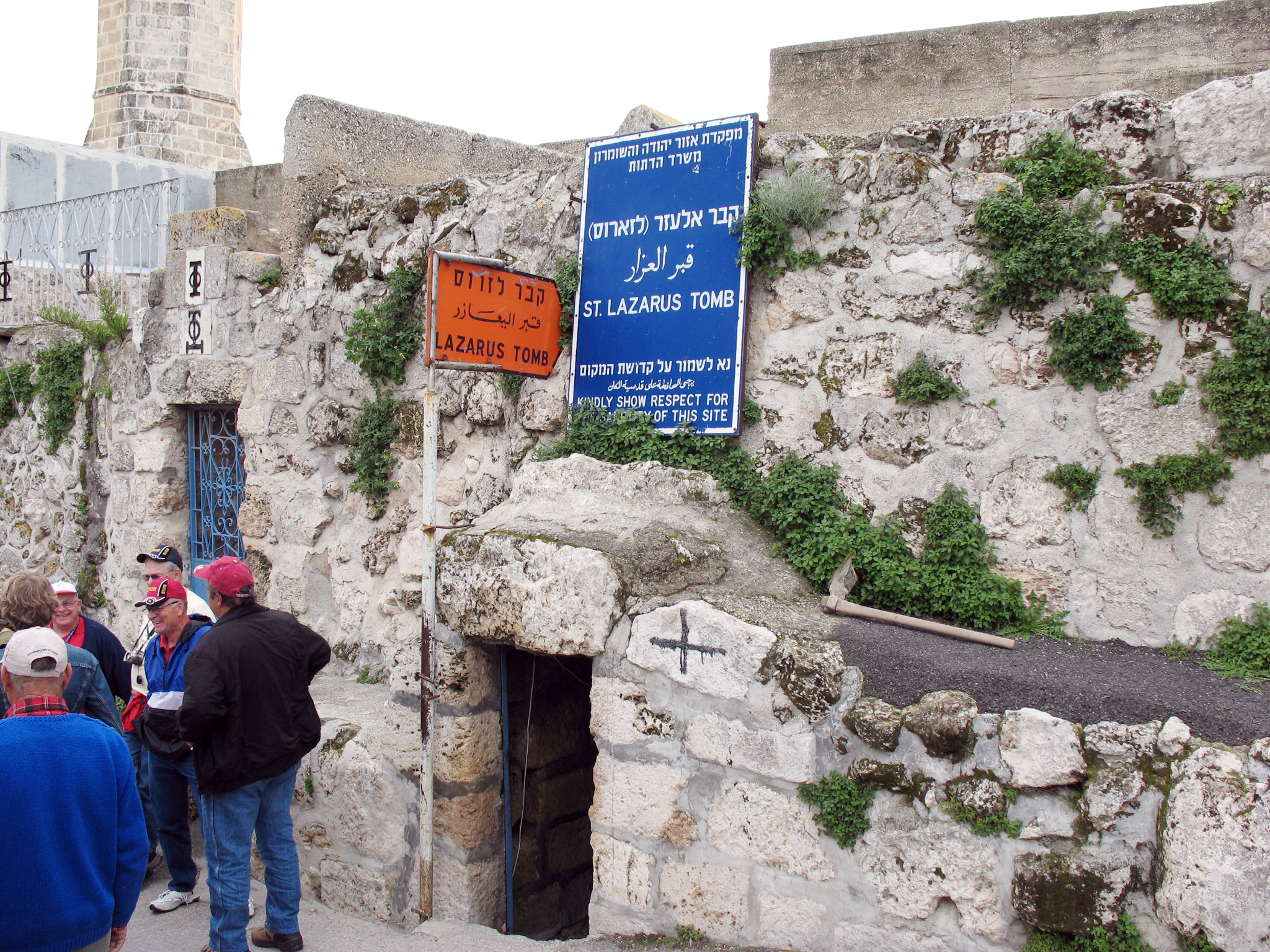
Tomb of Lazarus, 2007

=== Other sites ===
The oldest house in present-day al-Eizariya, a 2,000-year-old dwelling reputed to have been (or which at least serves as a reminder of) the House of Martha and Mary, is also a popular pilgrimage site.

The house of Simon the Leper, which is known by locals as the Tower of Lazarus, is maintained by the Greek Orthodox Church.

In 2014, a new mosque, the second largest in the wider-Jerusalem area, was opened, having been funded by the charitable foundation of named Sheikh Khalifa bin Zayed Al Nahyan, President of the United Arab Emirates.

== Bethany and care of the poor and sick ==
Capper and others have concluded that ancient Bethany was the site of an almshouse for the poor and a place of care for the sick. There is a hint of association between Bethany and care for the unwell in the Gospels: Mark tells of Simon the Leper's house there (Mark 14:3–10); Jesus receives urgent word of Lazarus' illness from Bethany (John 11:1–12:11).

According to the Temple Scroll from Qumran, three places for the care of the sick, including one for lepers, are to be east of Jerusalem. The passage also defines a (minimum) radius of three thousand cubits (circa 1,800 yards) around the city within which nothing unclean shall be seen (XLVI:13–18). Since Bethany was, according to John, fifteen stadia (about 1.72 miles) from the holy city, care for the sick there corresponded with the requirements of the Temple Scroll (the stadion being ideally 600 feet (180 m) or 400 cubits). Whereas Bethphage is probably to be identified with At-Tur, on the peak of the Mount of Olives with a magnificent view of Jerusalem, Bethany lay below to the southeast, out of view of the Temple Mount, which may have made its location suitable as a place for care of the sick, "out of view" of the Temple.

From this it is possible to deduce that the mention of Simon the Leper at Bethany in Mark's Gospel suggests that the Essenes, or pious patrons from Jerusalem who held to a closely similar view of ideal arrangements, settled lepers at Bethany. Such influence on the planning of Jerusalem and its environs (and even its Temple) may have been possible especially during the reign of Herod the Great (36–4 BC), whose favour towards the Essenes was noted by Josephus (Antiquities 15.10.5 [373–78]).

Reta Halteman Finger approves Capper's judgment that only in the context of an almshouse at Bethany, where the poor were received and assisted, could Jesus remark that "The poor you will always have with you" (Mark 14:7; Matthew 26:11) without sounding callous. Ling follows Capper's thesis concerning the connection between then place-name Bethany and the location there of an almshouse. Capper and Ling note that it is only in Bethany we find mention of the poor on the lips of the disciples, who object that the expensive perfumed oil poured over Jesus there might have been sold and the proceeds given to the poor (Mark 14:5; Matthew 26:8–9; John 12:4–6 [where the objection is made by Judas]); this objection may have been made in embarrassment and may also suggest a special connection between Bethany and care for the poor.

It has also been suggested, based on the names found carved on thousands of ossuaries at the site, that Bethany in the time of Jesus was settled by people from Galilee who had come to live by Jerusalem. This would explain why Jesus and the disciples, as Galileans, would find it convenient to stay here when visiting Jerusalem. As Capper writes,

Galilean pilgrims avoided potential conflict with Samaritans by travelling south on the eastern side of the Jordan. Bethany was the last station on their route to Jerusalem after crossing the river and taking the road through Jericho up into the highlands. A respectful distance from the city and Temple, and on the pilgrim route, Bethany was a most suitable location for a charitable institution. It is not surprising that an Essene hospice had been established at Bethany to intercept and care for pilgrims at the end of the long and potentially arduous journey from Galilee. The house combined this work with care for the sick and destitute of the Jerusalem area. Thus Bethany received its name because it was the Essene poorhouse par excellence, the poorhouse which alleviated poverty closest to the holy city.

== Notable residents ==
- Martha, Mary and Lazarus of Bethany, according to Christian tradition
- Said K. Aburish (1935–2012), author
- Aziz Abu Sarah (born 1980), peace activist

== Bibliography ==
- Aburish, S. (1988). Children of Bethany: the story of a Palestinian family. I.B.Tauris. ISBN 978-1-85043-109-1.
- Albright, W.F. (1922–1923). "Excavations and Results at Tell El-Fûl (Gibeah of Saul) by the Director of the School in Jerusalem". American Schools of Oriental Research, Annual. Vol. 4. pp. 158–160.
- Barron, J.B., ed. (1923). Palestine: Report and General Abstracts of the Census of 1922. Government of Palestine.
- Breen, Andrew Edward (1907). "Bethany" . In Herbermann, Charles (ed.). Catholic Encyclopedia. Vol. 2. New York: Robert Appleton Company.
- Capper, Brian J. (2006). "Essene Community Houses and Jesus' Early Community". In James H. Charlesworth (ed.). Jesus and Archaeology. Wm. B. Eerdmans Publishing. pp. 474–502. ISBN 978-0-8028-4880-2.
- Conder, C.R.; Kitchener, H.H. (1883). The Survey of Western Palestine: Memoirs of the Topography, Orography, Hydrography, and Archaeology. Vol. 3. London: Committee of the Palestine Exploration Fund.
- Dauphin, C. (1998). La Palestine byzantine, Peuplement et Populations. BAR International Series 726 (in French). Vol. III : Catalogue. Oxford: Archeopress. ISBN 0-860549-05-4.
- Dixon, W.H. (1866). The Holy Land. Chapman and Hall.
- Fabri, F. (1893). Felix Fabri (circa 1480–1483 A.D.) vol II, part I. Palestine Pilgrims' Text Society.
- Government of Jordan, Department of Statistics (1964). First Census of Population and Housing. Volume I: Final Tables; General Characteristics of the Population (PDF).
- Government of Palestine, Department of Statistics (1945). Village Statistics, April, 1945.
- Guérin, V. (1874). Description Géographique Historique et Archéologique de la Palestine. Vol 2 Samarie; pt. 1. Paris, L'Imprimerie Imp.
- Hadawi, S. (1970). Village Statistics of 1945: A Classification of Land and Area ownership in Palestine. Palestine Liberation Organization Research Centre. Archived from the original on 2018-12-08.
- Hartmann, M. (1883). "Die Ortschaftenliste des Liwa Jerusalem in dem türkischen Staatskalender für Syrien auf das Jahr 1288 der Flucht (1871)". Zeitschrift des Deutschen Palästina-Vereins. 6: 102–149.
- Hütteroth, W.-D.; Abdulfattah, K. (1977). Historical Geography of Palestine, Transjordan and Southern Syria in the Late 16th Century. Erlanger Geographische Arbeiten, Sonderband 5. Erlangen, Germany: Vorstand der Fränkischen Geographischen Gesellschaft. ISBN 3-920405-41-2.
- Jerome (1887). The pilgrimage of the holy Paula. Palestine Pilgrims' Text Society. (see p. 11 )
- Kark, R.; Oren-Nordheim, Michal (2001). Jerusalem and its environs: quarters, neighborhoods, villages, 1800-1948 (Illustrated ed.). Wayne State University Press. ISBN 978-0-8143-2909-2.
- Klein, S. (1910). "Remarks about the geography of ancient Palestine (German)". Monatsschrift für Geschichte und Wissenschaft des Judentums. 54 (1/2): 18–19. JSTOR 23081701.
- Le Strange, G. (1890). Palestine Under the Moslems: A Description of Syria and the Holy Land from A.D. 650 to 1500. Committee of the Palestine Exploration Fund.
- Maundrell, H. (1703). A journey from Aleppo to Jerusalem at Easter, A.D. 1697. Oxford : Printed at the Theater. (pp. 77 -78 )
- Mills, E., ed. (1932). Census of Palestine 1931. Population of Villages, Towns and Administrative Areas. Jerusalem: Government of Palestine.
- Murphy-O'Connor, J. (28 February 2008). The Holy Land: An Oxford Archaeological Guide from Earliest Times to 1700. OUP Oxford. p. 152. ISBN 978-0-19-152867-5.
- Neubauer, A. (1868). La géographie du Talmud : mémoire couronné par l'Académie des inscriptions et belles-lettres (in French). Paris: Lévy.
- Palmer, E.H. (1881). The Survey of Western Palestine: Arabic and English Name Lists Collected During the Survey by Lieutenants Conder and Kitchener, R. E. Transliterated and Explained by E.H. Palmer. Committee of the Palestine Exploration Fund.
- Pringle, D. (1993). The Churches of the Crusader Kingdom of Jerusalem: Volume I A-K (excluding Acre and Jerusalem). Cambridge University Press. ISBN 0-521-39036-2. (p. 122 ff.)
- Pringle, D. (1997). Secular buildings in the Crusader Kingdom of Jerusalem: an archaeological Gazetter. Cambridge University Press. ISBN 0521 46010 7. (p. 33)
- Robinson, E.; Smith, E. (1841). Biblical Researches in Palestine, Mount Sinai and Arabia Petraea: A Journal of Travels in the year 1838. Vol. 2. Boston: Crocker & Brewster.
- Robinson, E.; Smith, E. (1841). Biblical Researches in Palestine, Mount Sinai and Arabia Petraea: A Journal of Travels in the year 1838. Vol. 3. Boston: Crocker & Brewster.
- Saller, Sylvester John (1982). Excavations at Bethany (1949-1953). Franciscan Printing Press.
- Schick, C. (1896). "Zur Einwohnerzahl des Bezirks Jerusalem". Zeitschrift des Deutschen Palästina-Vereins. 19: 120–127.
- Shahin, Mariam (2005). Palestine: A Guide. Interlink Books. p. 332. ISBN 1-56656-557-X.
- Socin, A. (1879). "Alphabetisches Verzeichniss von Ortschaften des Paschalik Jerusalem". Zeitschrift des Deutschen Palästina-Vereins. 2: 135–163.
- Vogüé, de, M. (1860). Les églises de la Terre Sainte. (pp. 335-338 )
- Zuallart, J. [in French] (1587). Il devotissimo viaggio di Gervsalemme. Roma.
