= Tyrannion =

Tyrannion (Ancient Greek: Τυραννίων) may refer to:

- Tyrannion of Amisus (fl. 1st century), Greek grammarian
- Tyrannion of Antioch (died c. 308), Patriarch of Antioch
- Tyrannion of Tyre (died 311), Bishop of Tyre
- Tyrannion the Younger, a Greek sophist and pupil of Tyrannion of Amisus
- Tyrannion of Messenia, a Greek philosopher
