= Crusade of 1129 =

Attack by the Kingdom of Jerusalem on Damascus

- Part of the Crusades
| Date | October–December 1129 |
| Location | Vicinity of Damascus |
| Result | Damascene victory |
| Territorial changes | Crusaders take Banyas |

Belligerents
| Kingdom of Jerusalem; Principality of Antioch; County of Edessa; County of Tripoli | Emirate of Damascus |

Commanders and leaders
| Baldwin II of Jerusalem; Bohemond II of Antioch; Joscelin I of Edessa; Pons of Tripoli | Tāj al-Mulūk Būrī |

Strength
| 2,000 knights Perhaps 10,000 infantry | 7,000 regulars 8,000 auxiliaries |

Casualties and losses
| ~950 knights | |

The Crusade of 1129 or the Damascus Crusade was a military campaign of the Kingdom of Jerusalem with forces from the other Crusader states and from western Europe against the Emirate of Damascus. The brainchild of King Baldwin II of Jerusalem, the crusade failed to meet its military objectives. Its diplomatic preliminaries, however, secured the succession to the throne of Jerusalem and papal backing for the Knights Templar.

== Planning ==
=== Diplomacy ===
Baldwin II launched raids into Damascene territory in 1125 and 1126, culminating in the failed Battle of Marj al-Saffar. The raids convinced him that he needed outside support to take the city. For this purpose he sent three embassies to western Europe in 1127–1128. Historian Steven Runciman argues that the death of Ṭughtigin, emir of Damascus, on 11 February 1128 caused Baldwin to plan another attempt on Damascus, but the evidence that an embassy had already been sent in 1127 suggests that the decision had already been made. Baldwin did not campaign in 1127 or 1128, which further suggests that he was building up his forces rather than acting opportunistically.

In 1127, Baldwin dispatched Hugh of Payns to Europe to recruit powerful men to the cause of a campaign against Damascus. He also sought papal approval of his military order, the Templars. Baldwin also sent William of Bures and Guy Brisebarre to arrange the marriage of his heiress Melisende with Count Fulk V of Anjou. They left in the late summer or fall of 1127 and returned by May 1129. Fulk was a wealthy widower who had previously made a pilgrimage to Jerusalem in 1120. The third embassy, undertaken by Archbishop William I of Tyre and Bishop Roger of Ramla, was to secure the approval of Pope Honorius II for the marriage, since it would result in Fulk becoming king of Jerusalem upon Baldwin's death. In a letter of May 1128, Honorius confirmed Baldwin as the legitimate king of Jerusalem and approved Fulk as his heir.

It is not certain if Baldwin received a papal endorsement for his offensive action. Jonathan Phillips calls it "an early example of a crusade that was wholly aggressive in its purpose". In terms of protecting the Holy Places, it could be justified only as the removal of a nearby threat. Circumstantial evidence suggests that it may have received papal approval. Charters show prospective Crusaders taking their vows in exchange for the remission of sins, something only the church could have guaranteed. A papal legate, Bishop Gerard of Angoulême, was present when Fulk, having accepted the marriage proposal, made his vow at Le Mans in May 1128. Hugh did not personally meet the pope, however, but only a papal legate, Matthew of Albano, at the Council of Troyes in January 1129, where the rule of the Templars was approved. The absence of direct evidence of papal involvement may indicate "lack of clarity in how crusades should be started" at this early date.

=== Recruitment ===
The recruitment of the crusade was unique. It was undertaken entirely by Baldwin's agents, principally Hugh of Payns. There is no evidence of preaching. The only previous expedition recruited in this way was the Crusade of 1107, which was recruited in France by its leader Bohemond I of Antioch, who had papal approval. No subsequent crusade was recruited by men sent from the Crusader states but rather by European preachers.

It is unknown how many Crusaders Hugh recruited in Europe. Both Christian and Muslim sources agree that the army Fulk brought with him was a large one. According to the Anglo-Saxon Chronicle, "there went with [Hugh of Payns] and after him so large a number of people as never had done since the first expedition", i.e., the First Crusade of 1096–1099. The Gesta Ambaziensium dominorum records "innumerable knights and foot soldiers and many men of consular rank", i.e., counts. The recruits came mostly from Anjou, Champagne, Flanders, Normandy and Provence. There is some evidence that Hugh recruited in England and Scotland. He received a large sum of money from King Henry I of England. According to Orderic Vitalis, many of William Clito's followers joined the crusade after the assassination of their lord.

The army for the Damascus campaign was not raised entirely in Europe. The other Crusader states—the Principality of Antioch, the County of Edessa and the County of Tripoli—also sent forces led personally by their respective rulers—Bohemond II, Joscelin I and Pons. The contemporary Damascene chronicler Ibn al-Ḳalānisī places the total force raised by both Hugh and Fulk at 60,000 men, mostly infantry. Ibn al-Athīr, writing in the 13th century, gives the number of knights as 2,000 and the infantry as numerous. Thomas Asbridge estimates the size of the combined army (including the Crusader states' forces) at 2,000 knights and 10,000 infantry. Jamal Al-Zanki estimates the army at 30,000 with 2,000 knights.

Ibn al-Ḳalānisī says that Damascus had 8,000 mercenaries and volunteers drawn from the Bedouin and the Turcomans. This was in addition to the regular army, which was mostly composed of Turcomans and probably numbered about 7,000. The commander of the Bedouin auxiliares was Murra ibn Rabīʿa. According to Ibn al-Ḳalānisī, the Turcoman auxiliaries in the Damascene army looked forward to fighting infidels, an attitude that seems to presage the rise of jihadist politics among the Muslims.

== Campaign ==
=== Banyas ===
Fulk sailed in early or mid-April and arrived in the Kingdom of Jerusalem in late May 1129. He seems to have delayed his departure for about a year in order to allow Hugh of Payns time to recruit an army, since it was safest and most efficient for the entire European army to travel together. His marriage to Melisende took place in Jerusalem before the campaign against Damascus, which did not set out until October.

Winter campaigns were unusual, and the Damascus campaign is often seen as delayed by unknown factors. Hugh did not arrive in the Kingdom of Jerusalem until several months after the Council of Troyes, which Christopher Tyerman cites as a possible cause of the delay. On the other hand, the campaign is sometimes seen as hastened rather than delayed. This depends on the claim by Ibn al-Athīr that Baldwin had negotiated an agreement with conspirators within Damascus to hand the city over to him. On a specified Friday, the vizier of Damascus, Abū ʿAlī Ṭāhir ibn Saʿd al-Mazdaqānī, was to lock the people in the mosque and open the gates to the Crusaders. In return, the vizier would be given Tyre, which had recently been conquered for the Kingdom of Jerusalem by the Crusade of 1122–1124.

In any case, no such handover occurred because the emir of Damascus, Tāj al-Mulūk Būrī, had the vizier and the Assassins who supported him massacred on 4 September 1129. This in turn propelled Ismāʿīl al-ʿAjamī, the Assassin commander of the town of Banyas, to surrender his fortress to the Crusaders and take refuge with his men in the Kingdom of Jerusalem. This was the only territorial acquisition associated with the Crusade of 1129. The Crusader army marched out to accept the surrender of Banyas before turning towards its main objective. The need to garrison Banyas may have influenced the start date of the campaign. Baldwin placed Renier Brus in charge of Banyas.

=== Damascus ===
In October, the combined Crusader army marched to within six miles of Damascus. They set up camp near the Wooden Bridge (Jisr al-Khashab) at Dārayyā southwest of the city. According to William of Tyre, the goal was to take Damascus either by assault or by siege. The emir of Damascus set up camp facing the Crusaders. The main sources, William of Tyre and Ibn al-Ḳalānisī, agree that the Crusaders got no closer to Damascus than this, but Ibn al-Athīr suggests that some sort of siege was in fact begun.

In early November, William of Bures led a foraging expedition south into the Hauran. According to Muslim sources, this expedition consisted of the elite troops. William of Tyre says they were 1,000 knights "of lesser rank". The foragers carelessly spread themselves thin over a wide area. Learning of this, Tāj al-Mulūk Būrī sent his elite cavalry—a mixed force of Turcomans, Bedouins and the ʿaskar of Hama under Shams al-Khawāṣṣ—to attack the foragers at a place called Burāq in the Marj al-Ṣuffar some 20 miles south of the main position. The foraging army was unprepared for an attack. According to Ibn al-Athīr, 300 knights and 10,000 sheep were captured. Only William of Bures and 39 others made it back to camp to report the rout. Būrī's panegyrist, Ibn al-Qaysarānī, praised this victory: "you [Būrī] led the horses, protected [your] land and folks".

Following the defeat, Baldwin gave the order to attack, but the troops were prevented from advancing by a sudden thunderstorm and the ensuing fog. The rains made the road to Damascus impassable. According to William of Tyre, this was interpreted as divine punishment for their sins and a sign that they should retreat. Ibn al-Athīr and Ibn al-Ḳalānisī claim that the Crusaders retreated out of fear of the army of Damascus. According to Michael the Syrian, who may be relying on the lost contemporary chronicle of Basil bar Shumna, Damascus paid 20,000 dinars and offered annual tribute in return for the Crusaders' withdrawal. The Crusader army decamped on 5 December, leaving behind a substantial baggage to be captured. Its rearguard was harassed by the enemy continuously during the retreat, which was slow but orderly. Upon its return, the army immediately broke up. According to Ibn al-Ḳalānisī, with its retreat "the hearts of the Muslims [of Damascus] were relieved from terror".

In examining the Crusaders' defeat, Tyerman points out the logistical difficulties inherent in an attack on Damascus, which would require long supply lines across enemy territory. Al-Zanki suggests that a mere 2,000 knights would indicate a shortage of cavalrymen and horses. The failure of the crusade marks the end of a period of aggression that included the capture of Tyre and siege of Aleppo (1124) and three campaigns against Damascus. A subsequent attempt was made on Damascus during the Second Crusade.

== List of participants ==
- Baldwin II of Jerusalem
- Bohemond II of Antioch
- Geoffrey of Bello Mortario
- Guitier of Rethel (possible)
- Hugh of Payns
- Hugh III of Le Puiset
- Hugh of Chaumont
- Fulk V of Anjou
- Joscelin I of Edessa
- Pons of Tripoli
- Reginald I of Bar
- Robert Burgundio and his brother Henry (possible)
- Thierry of Chièvres
- Walter Tirel III (probable)
- William of La Ferté-Vidame
- William VI of Montpellier (possible)

Jonathan Riley-Smith lists nine other probable or possible crusaders, including at least one German, Berthold, lord of Sperberseck.
