= Robert of Rouen =

Robert of Rouen may refer to:

- Robert II (archbishop of Rouen) (died 1037)
- Robert, Bishop of Lydda and Ramla (died bef. 1112)

== See also ==
- Robert of Normandy (disambiguation)
