= See of Tyre =

The See of Tyre was one of the most ancient dioceses in Christianity. The existence of a Christian community here in the time of Saint Paul is mentioned in the Acts of the Apostles. Seated at Tyre, which was the capital of the Roman province of Phoenicia Prima, the bishopric was a metropolitan see. Its position was briefly challenged by the see of Berytus in the mid-5th century; but after 480/1 the metropolitan of Tyre established itself as the first (protothronos) of all those subject to the Patriarch of Antioch.

In the summer of 2017, a Greek mosaic measured at five-metres long was found west of the Sea of Galilee. The excavation was co-directed by historian Jacob Ashkenazi and archaeologist Mordechai Aviam and it named Irenaeus as bishop of Tyre. Since the inscription provides the date of the church's completion as 445, it gives credence to a date as early as 444 CE for his ordination.

== Latin archdiocese ==
=== Background ===
The See of Tyre was the most prestigious archbishopric under the authority of the patriarchs of Antioch from the 5th century. The archbishops had more than a dozen suffragans, including the bishops of Acre, Beirut, Byblos, Sidon, Tripoli and Tortosa. The crusaders captured Tortosa (now Tartus in Syria) in 1102, Byblos in 1103, and Tripoli in 1109. In the late 1170s, William of Tyre wrote that Bernard of Valence, the Latin patriarch of Antioch, had soon appointed Latin bishops to the three bishoprics. Documents written in the early 12th century did not refer to the bishops of the three dioceses, suggesting that the three sees, all located in the newly established crusader County of Tripoli, were actually left vacant. After King Baldwin I of Jerusalem captured Sidon and Beirut in 1110, Ghibbelin of Arles, the Latin patriarch of Jerusalem, convinced Baldwin I to ask Pope Paschal II to place the two sees and also the bishopric of Acre under the jurisdiction of the patriarchs of Jerusalem. Accepting the king's argumentation, the pope ruled on 8 June 1111 that the boundaries of the ecclesiastical provinces should follow the political frontiers. Patriarch Bernard protested, but the pope confirmed his decision, emphasizing his right to alter the boundaries of the patriarchates.

=== Establishment ===
Gormond of Picquigny signed a treaty with the Venetians about the joint conquest of Tyre on behalf of Baldwin II of Jerusalem in December 1123. The patriarch had already consecrated a cleric, Odo, as the archbishop of Tyre, most probably because he wanted to prevent the Latin patriarch of Antioch from appointing his candidate to the see. Odo died before the crusaders and the Venetians captured Tyre on 7 July 1124. Communion with the See of Rome was broken following the East–West Schism. When the crusaders conquered Tyre in 1124, the Eastern Orthodox archbishop withdrew to Constantinople.

The most notable of the Latin archbishops of Tyre of this time was the historian William of Tyre, who served from 1175 to 1185.

Tyre then belonged to the Kingdom of Jerusalem, rather than the Principality of Antioch. On the basis of the pentarchy system, the Latin patriarch of Antioch claimed the right to appoint the archbishop, which was exercised by the Latin patriarch of Jerusalem. Pope Innocent II adjudicated the dispute in favour of Jerusalem on the basis of a decree of Pope Paschal II granting King Baldwin the right to make all sees taken by the crusaders from the Muslims subject to Jerusalem. Finally, in a legatine council in April 1141 convened in the Templum Domini by Alberic of Ostia the question was settled and Antioch's claim to Tyre rejected. The Latin patriarch of Jerusalem was usually either the archbishop of Tyre or of Caesarea in Palaestina.

In 1187, after Saladin's invasion, Tyre was the only city remaining in crusader hands and was at one point considered as the new capital of the kingdom. It lost that appellation to Acre, but it remained the site of the coronation of the king, and the archbishop was given the responsibility of officiating at the coronation.

Starting with Sultan Baibars in 1254, the Islamic chieftains declared jihad on the crusaders and slowly started exterminating the remaining Christian communities on the coastlands. The last archbishops, John and Bonacourt, devoted their rule to forestalling the Mamluk conquest, attempting to obtain the freedom of enslaved Christians, caring for refugees, and preparing for the coming assault. After a long siege, the city was captured by the Mamluks in 1291. The city was mostly evacuated by the time the Mamluks arrived, but the remaining population, including the archbishop, were killed or enslaved. The churches were torn down, and the archdiocese became titular; only in the 18th and 19th centuries was a new archbishop appointed to protect the newly restored pilgrim routes. Due to the ongoing conflict and dislocations in modern Lebanon and the decline of influence of Christianity there, the see has remained vacant again since 1984.

== Early bishops or archbishops of Tyre ==
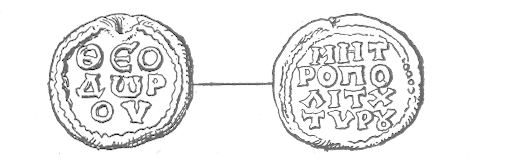
Seal of Theodore, Metropolitan of Tyre (5th/6th century)

- Cassius (c. 190 AD)
- Marinus (c. 250)
- Tyrannio, martyred under Diocletian
- Dorotheus I, martyred under Julian the Apostate
- Paulinus
- Zeno I (mentioned in 325)
- Paulus (mentioned in 335)
  - Vitalis (mentioned in 344), an Arian
  - Uranius (mentioned in 359), an Arian
- Zeno II (before 366–381)
- Diodorus (381–?)
- Reverentius †
- Cyrus (?–431, deposed at the Council of Ephesus as a supporter of Nestorius
- Berenicianus (431–?)
  - Irenaeus (in or before 445–449), a Nestorian
- Photius (c. 449)
- Dorotheus II (mentioned in 458)
- John Codonatus (before 482 – c. 488), who became Patriarch of Antioch
- Epiphanius (mentioned in 518)
- Eusebius (mentioned in 553)
- Thomas (before 869 – after 879)

== Latin archbishops of Tyre ==
- Odo (c. 1122–1123 or 1124)
- William I (c. 1127–1135)
- Fulcher of Angoulême (c. 1135–1146)
- Ralph the Englishman (1146–1150) (elected archbishop, who was not consecrated)
- Peter of Barcelona (1151–1164)
- Frederick of la Roche (1164–1174)
- William II (1175–1186) (historian)
- Joscius (1186–1202)
- Clarembald of Broies (1202–1215)
- Simon of Maugastel (c. 1216–1229)
- Hugh (c. 1231–c. 1234)
- Peter of Sargines (1235–1244)
- Philip of Tripoli (elected archbishop, disputed, resigned 1250)
- Nicholas Larcat (1251–1253)
- Gilles of Saumur (1253–1266)
- John of Saint Maxentius (1267–1272)
- Bonacursus de Gloire (1272–1295)
- Scolaius de Ardinghelli (1295-1299) Titular as Bishop of Arborea
- Joseph Simon Assemani (titular, 18th century)
- Annibale della Genga (titular, 1793–1816)
- Giacomo Giustiniani (1817–1826)
- Domenico Maria Jacobini (1881–1896)
- Franz Xaver Nagl (1910–1911, later Archbishop of Vienna)
- Vittorio Ranuzzi de' Bianchi (1911–1916)
- Rodolfo Caroli (1917–1921)
- Pietro Benedetti (1921–1930)
- Egidio Lari (1931–1965)
- Bruno Wüstenberg (1966–1984)

== Sources ==
- Andrea, A. J. (1987). "Conrad of Krosigk, Bishop of Halberstadt, Crusader and Monk of Sittichenbach: His Ecclesiastical Career, 1184–1225". Analecta Cisterciensia. 43: 11–91.
- Hamilton, Bernard (2016). The Latin Church in the Crusader States: The Secular Church. Routledge. ISBN 9780860780724.
- Lock, Peter (2006). The Routledge Companion to the Crusades. Routledge. ISBN 9-78-0-415-39312-6.
- Rowe, John Gordon (1960–1961). "The Papacy and the Ecclesiastical Province of Tyre (1100–1187)". Bulletin of the John Rylands Library. 43: 160–190. doi:10.7227/BJRL.43.1.8. ISSN 2054-9318.
