= Peter of Barcelona =

12th century archbishop of Tyre

Peter of Barcelona was a 12th-century prelate of the Catholic Church in the Kingdom of Jerusalem. He was prior of the Holy Sepulchre from 1144 to 1151 and then archbishop of Tyre until 1164.

== Early career ==
Peter was born into nobility in Barcelona. He trained as an ecclesiastical administrator. In 1120 he became a canon of the Holy Sepulchre, and was appointed subprior by the prior, William of Malines. William was elected Latin patriarch of Jerusalem in 1130, and was succeeded as prior by another Peter. Peter the Prior and Peter of Barcelona worked closely together until 1144, when the prior died and was succeeded by Peter of Barcelona.

In 1146 the archbishopric of Tyre became vacant when its archbishop, Fulcher of Angoulême, was made elected patriarch in succession to William of Malines, who had died in September 1145. Queen Melisende insisted that her chancellor, Ralph the Englishman, be installed as the new archbishop, but Fulcher's preferred candidate was Peter. Fulcher and the cathedral chapter appealed to the Holy See. In the meantime Peter continued his namesake predecessor's mission of establishing and enforcing the rights of the Holy Sepulchre, obtaining from Pope Eugene III two bulls confirming the canons' property and fiscal and judicial privileges.

== Archiepiscopate ==
Pope Eugene III sided with Patriarch Fulcher in the latter's dispute with Queen Melisende over the see of Tyre, and in 1151 Peter was made archbishop of Tyre. Amalric of Nesle succeeded him as prior of the Holy Sepulchre.

As the second highest-ranked prelate in the kingdom, Peter regularly attended the royal court and occasionally accompanied the king on military campaigns. Historian Bernard Hamilton believes that it is due to Peter's advice to the king that Jerusalem recognized Alexander III as pope after the contested 1159 papal election. Peter also held onto his beliefs: when the imperious Patriarch Fulcher ordered the prior and canons of the Mount of Olives to walk barefoot through Jerusalem as public penance, Peter joined them and convinced his suffragans, the bishops of Banyas and Beirut, to do the same, thus expressing his disapproval of the sentence. Peter remained archbishop until 1164.

Peter is the only archbishop of Tyre of whom the later archbishop and chronicler William of Tyre was not critical. William described him as:

... a man of remarkable innocence and gentleness of character. He feared God and abhorred evil, and his memory will be held blessed by God and by men. He was a nobleman by birth, but he was even more noble in his spiritual life. Volumes could be written about his life and character.

Catholic Church titles
Vacant Ralph as unconsecrated archbishop Title last held by Fulcher of Angoulême	Archbishop of Tyre; 1151-1164	Succeeded by Frederick of la Roche
