= Saint Cassius =

Saint Cassius may refer to:

- Cassius of Clermont, martyr, 3rd century. Martyred with Victorinus, Maximus, Anatolius, Linguinus, and others
- Cassius of Narni, bishop of Narni, 6th century
- Saint Cassius, companion of Saint Gereon
- Saint Cassius, companion of Saint Castus
- Saint Cassius (musician) American musician
- See Carpophorus, Exanthus, Cassius, Severinus, Secundus, and Licinius for Saint Cassius
