= Robert of Paris =

Robert of Paris (Note: In Latin, Ro(d)bertus Parisiensis.) was the cardinal-presbyter of Sant'Eusebio from 1100 until his deposition in 1112. He was restored in 1119, but died shortly after. He served as an apostolic legate to the Holy Land in 1102 in the aftermath of the First Crusade, during a critical period in the formation of the Kingdom of Jerusalem.

Robert is sometimes said to have been created a cardinal by Pope Urban II in 1088, but in fact he is only attested as a cardinal for the first time on 25 August 1100 in Salerno. Shortly after, he attended the synod of Melfi in October 1100, the first synod held under Paschal II.

In 1102, Robert was sent to the Holy Land as an apostolic legate to replace the late Cardinal Maurice of Porto. On 8 October 1102, he formally deposed the patriarch of Jerusalem, Dagobert, on charges of murder, treason and embezzlement. He then presided over the election of his successor, Ebremar.

Robert attended the synod held in the Lateran during Lent 1105. His presence may indicate that it was this council that restored Dagobert to the patriarchate, since in a letter to the church, king and people of Jerusalem written in 1107, after Dagobert's death, (Note: Dagobert probably died on 17 July 1105, shortly after this restoration by the council.) Paschal II refers to the patriarch's restoration by a council following many tribulations at the hands of the addressees.

In 1111, Robert was one of the strongest opponents of the so-called Pravilege ("bad law"), in which Paschal II, a virtual prisoner of the Emperor Henry V, had conceded the right of investiture to the emperor. He was one of the authors, along with Leo of Ostia, Gregory of Terracina, Girard of Angoulême, Gualo of Saint-Pol-de-Léon and Gregory of Santi Apostoli, of the Gesta dampnationis pravilegii, a violently-worded tract condemning the Pravilege. On account of his strong opposition to any compromise with the emperor, Paschal deposed him (along with Gregory of Santi Apostoli) in 1112 on the charge of heresy. He was only restored in 1119 after writing a letter to the new pope, Calixtus II, congratulating him on his election and asking to have the stain of heresy removed.

== Bibliography ==
- Blumenthal, Uta-Renate (1978). The Early Councils of Pope Paschal II, 1100–1110. Toronto: Pontifical Institute of Mediaeval Studies.
- Klewitz, Hans-Walter (1936). "Die Entstehung des Kardinalkollegiums". Zeitschrift der Savigny-Stiftung für Rechtsgeschichte: Kanonistische Abteilung. 25 (1): 115–221. doi:10.7767/zrgka.1936.25.1.115. S2CID 184147434.
- Moroni, Gaetano (1852). Dizionario di erudizione storico-ecclesiastica da S. Pietro sino ai nostri giorni. Vol. 58. Venice: Tipografia Emiliana.
- Robinson, I. S. (1990). The Papacy, 1073–1198: Continuity and Innovation. Cambridge: Cambridge University Press.
- Rowe, John Gordon (1957). "Paschal II and the Relation between the Spiritual and Temporal Powers in the Kingdom of Jerusalem". Speculum. 32 (3): 470–501. doi:10.2307/2849891. JSTOR 2849891. S2CID 161656999.
- Rowe, John Gordon (1966). "Paschal II, Bohemund of Antioch and the Byzantine Empire" (PDF). Bulletin of the John Rylands Library. 49 (1): 165–202. doi:10.7227/BJRL.49.1.8. Archived from the original (PDF) on 2017-11-07.
