= Stephen of Chartres =

Stephen of Chartres may refer to:

- Stephen, Count of Blois and of Chartres
- Stephen of La Ferté, of the family of the vidames of Chartres, Latin patriarch of Jerusalem
