= Council of Nablus =

Council of ecclesiastic and secular lords in 1120

Coat of arms of the kingdom of Jerusalem.

The Council of Nablus, held on January 16, 1120, was a council of ecclesiastic and secular lords in the crusader Kingdom of Jerusalem.

== History ==
The council was convened at Nablus by Warmund, Patriarch of Jerusalem, and King Baldwin II of Jerusalem. It established twenty-five canons dealing with both religious and secular affairs. It was not quite a church council, but not quite a meeting of the royal court; according to Hans Mayer, due to the religious nature of many of the canons, it can be considered both a parlement and an ecclesiastical synod. The resulting agreement between the patriarch and the king was a concordat, similar to the Concordat of Worms two years later.

The council established the first written laws for the kingdom. It was probably also where Hugues de Payens obtained permission from King Baldwin II of Jerusalem and Warmund, Patriarch of Jerusalem to found the Knights Templar.

The council was not mentioned by Fulcher of Chartres, who served in Baldwin II's retinue and was likely present. This omission probably occurred because the canons, which addressed the crimes and sins of the Latin population, contradicted his portrayal of the Kingdom as a Christian utopia. William of Tyre, writing about sixty years later, included a detailed account of the proceedings, but neglected to record any of the canons themselves, which he felt were well-known and could be found in any local church; however, he also probably wanted to avoid the implication that the early Kingdom was not as heroic as his generation remembered it.

Although the canons may have been well known in William's time, only one copy, located in a church in Sidon, seemed to survive the Muslim reconquest of the Kingdom. This copy made its way to Europe where it was in the papal library at Avignon by 1330. It is now located in the Vatican Library, MS Vat. Lat. 1345.

A copy was edited in the Sacrorum Conciliorum nova et amplissima collectio of Giovanni Domenico Mansi in the 18th century, and more recently a new edition has been published by Benjamin Z. Kedar in Speculum (Vol. 74, 1999). Kedar argues that the canons are largely derived from the Byzantine Ekloge ton nomon, promulgated by Leo III and Constantine V in 741. Kedar believes that the canons were put into practise in the 12th century, although Marwan Nader disagrees, since they were not included in the Livre des Assises de la Cour des Bourgeois and other Assizes of Jerusalem, which were written in the 13th century.

== Content ==
The canons begin with the reasons for calling the council: Jerusalem had been plagued with locusts and mice for the past four years, and the Crusader states in general were suffering from repeated attacks from the Muslims. It was believed that the sins of the people needed to be corrected before Jerusalem could prosper.

Canons 1-3 deal with tithes to the church. Canon 1 is a promise by King Baldwin II to surrender the appropriate tithes to the Patriarch, namely those from his own royal estates in Jerusalem, Nablus and Acre. In canon 2 Baldwin II seeks forgiveness for the tithes he had previously withheld, and Warmund absolves him of this sin in canon 3. This shows that the church was able to assert its rights in the Crusader Kingdom, a victory in the Investiture Conflict still raging in Europe.

Canons 4-7 deal with adultery. Canon 4 outlines punishments for a man who is suspected of committing adultery with the wife of another man; first, he is to be forbidden from visiting the woman, and if he visits her again, he is to come before the church and be subjected to the ordeal of hot iron to prove his innocence. If he is proven to have committed adultery, canon 5 decrees that "eviretur" - he should have his penis cut off - and then he should be exiled. The punishment for the adulterous woman is mutilation of the nose, a familiar Byzantine punishment, unless her husband takes pity on her, in which case they should both be exiled. Canon 6 deals with a similar situation for clerics: if a man suspects a cleric from visiting his wife, the cleric should firstly be forbidden from visiting her; a second offense should be pointed out to a church magistrate, and a third offense will result in the deordination of the cleric. He will then be subject to the same punishments described in canon 5. Canon 7 forbids a pimp or a prostitute from "corrupting a wife with words" and causing her to become an adulterer. The punishments in canon 5 apply here as well.

Canons 8-11 establish punishments for sodomy, the first appearance of such punishments in medieval law. According to canon 8, an adult sodomite, "tam faciens quam paciens" (both the active and the passive parties), should be burned at the stake. If, however, the passive party is a child or an elderly person, canon 9 says that only the active party should be burned, and it will suffice that the passive party repent, as he is presumed to have sinned against his will. If the sodomy is against his will but he keeps it hidden for whatever reason, canon 10 says that he too will be judged as a sodomite. Canon 11 allows for a sodomite to repent and avoid punishment, but if he is found to have participated in sodomy a second time, he will be allowed to repent again but will be exiled from the kingdom.

Canons 12-15 pertain to sexual relations with Muslims, an important question in the Kingdom, where Muslims far outnumbered their Latin overlords. Canon 12 states that a man who willingly has sexual relations with a Muslim woman should be castrated, and she should have her nose mutilated. If a man rapes his own female Muslim slave, according to canon 13 she should be confiscated by the state, and he should be castrated. If he rapes another man's female Muslim slave, canon 14 says that he should be subjected to the punishment for adulterers stated in canon 5, castration. Canon 15 deals with the same subject for Christian women - if a Christian woman willingly has sexual relations with a Muslim man, they should both be subjected to the punishment for adulterers, but if she was raped, then she will not be held accountable, and the Muslim will be castrated.

Canon 16 prohibits Muslims from dressing like Christians. This canon foreshadows the similar canon 68 of the Fourth Lateran Council almost one hundred years later in 1215, which would prohibit both Jews and Muslims from adopting Christian dress. Similar laws were promulgated in Spain, where Christians, Jews, and Muslims similarly intermingled.

Canons 17-19 deal with bigamy, another important subject, as many crusaders had abandoned their families in Europe. If a man takes a second wife, he should do penance until the first Sunday of Lent, but if he hides his crime and is discovered, his property should be confiscated, and he should be exiled. Canon 18 allows for bigamy to go unpunished if a man or woman unknowingly marries someone who is already married, as long as they can prove their ignorance. If a man has taken a second wife and wishes to divorce her, canon 19 states that he must prove that he is already married, either by the ordeal of hot iron, or by bringing witnesses to swear for him.

Canons 20-21 deal with clerics. Canon 20 says a cleric should not be held guilty if he takes up arms in self-defense, but he cannot take up arms for any other reason nor can he act like a knight. This was an important concern for the Crusader states; clerics were generally forbidden from participating in warfare in European law, but the Crusaders needed all the manpower they could find, and only one year before, Antioch had been defended by the Patriarch following the Battle of Ager Sanguinis, one of the calamities referred to in the introduction to the canons. Canon 21 says that a monk or canon regular who apostatizes should either return to his order or go into exile.

Canon 22 simply forbids false accusations.

Canons 23-25 pertain to theft. Canon 23 says that anyone convicted of stealing property worth more than one bezant should have either a hand or foot cut off, or an eye removed. If the property was worth less than one bezant, he should be branded on the face and publicly whipped. The stolen goods should be returned, but if they are no longer in the thief's possession, the thief himself becomes the property of his victim. If the thief is caught stealing again, he should either have his other hand, foot, or eye removed, or he should be killed. If the thief was underage, canon 24 says he should be kept in custody and then sent to the royal court, but no further punishment is outlined. Canon 25 states that these punishments also do not apply to the barons, who should be subject only to the judgement of the royal court.

== Signatories ==
Those who signed as witnesses to the canons were mostly ecclesiastics, with a few secular nobles:

- Warmund, Patriarch of Jerusalem
- Baldwin II, King of Jerusalem
- Ehremar, Archbishop of Caesarea
- Bernard, Bishop of Nazareth
- Ansquitinus, Bishop of Bethlehem
- Roger, Bishop of Ramla
- Guildoinus, abbot-elect of St. Mary of the Valley of Josaphat
- Peter, abbot of Mount Tabor
- Achardus, prior of the Temple
- Arnaldus, prior of Mount Sion
- Girardus, prior of the Holy Sepulchre
- Pagan, chancellor of Jerusalem
- Eustace Grenier, Lord of Caesarea and Sidon, constable of Jerusalem
- William de Buris
- Barisan, constable of Jaffa
- Baldwin, Lord of Ramla

The signatories appear after the introduction, and before the list of canons begins.

== See also ==
- Pactum Warmundi

== Bibliography ==
- Mayer, Hans E. "Concordat of Nablus." Journal of Ecclesiastical History 33 (October 1982): 531–543.
- Kedar, Benjamin Z. "On the Origins of the Earliest Laws of Frankish Jerusalem: The Canons of the Council of Nablus, 1120." Speculum 74 (1999): 310–335.
- Nader, Marwan. Burgesses and Burgess Law in the Latin Kingdoms of Jerusalem and Cyprus (1099-1325). Ashgate, 2006.
- Barber, Malcolm. The Trial of the Templars. Cambridge University Press, 1978.
- Selwood, Dominic, ‘Quidem autem dubitaverunt: The Saint, the Sinner, the Temple and a Possible Chronology,’ in Autour de la Première Croisade, M Balard (ed.), Publications de la Sorbonne, 1996, pp. 221–30
