= Payns =

Commune in Grand Est, France

- Commune
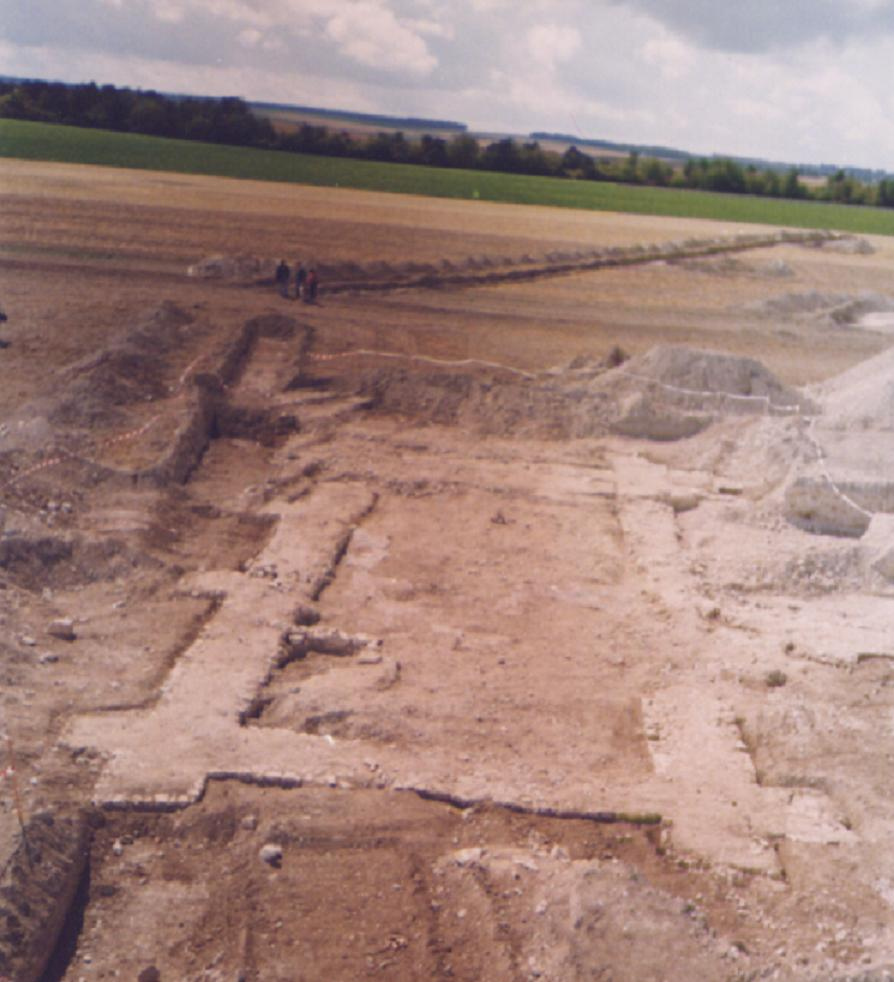
- Foundation of a chapel

- Coat of arms
- Location of Payns
- Location within France Location within Grand Est
- Coordinates: 48°22′57″N 3°58′41″E
- Country: France
- Region: Grand Est
- Department: Aube
- Arrondissement: Troyes
- Canton: Saint-Lyé
- Intercommunality: CA Troyes Champagne Métropole

Government
  - Mayor (2020–2026): Michel Sainton
- Area^{1}: 16.97 km^{2} (6.55 sq mi)
- Elevation: 97 m (318 ft)
- Population (2023): 1,394
  - Density: 82.14/km^{2} (212.8/sq mi)
- Time zone: UTC+01:00 (CET)
  - Summer (DST): UTC+02:00 (CEST)
- INSEE/Postal code: 10282 /10600
- ^{1} French Land Register data, which excludes lakes, ponds, glaciers > 1 km^{2} (0.386 sq mi or 247 acres) and river estuaries.

Payns (French pronunciation: [pɛ̃]) is a commune in the Aube department in north-central France.

== Hydrography ==
The commune lies within the Seine-Normandy drainage basin. It is drained by the former Haute-Seine Canal, the Seine, the Fausse, the Savières commune Canal 01, the Fontaine de Conge, the Fosse Baudrey Ditch 01, the Neuve Rivière Ditch, the Noue Ditch, the Noue Violette Ditch, the Noue du Petit Bois, the Tirva, the Pont la Bique river, and various other small watercourses.

The Seine, a river 775 km in length, flows through the Paris Basin—specifically crossing the Aube department from southeast to northwest. It runs along the commune's northeastern edge.

The former Haute-Seine Canal is a non-navigable canal/channel measuring 38.2 km in length. It originates in the commune of Barberey-Saint-Sulpice and flows into the Aube at the commune of Marcilly-sur-Seine.

The Fausse, 10 km in length, originates in the commune of Sainte-Maure and flows into the Melda at Villacerf, after passing through six communes.

Two bodies of water complement the hydrographic network: the Payns commune body of water no. 1 (1.8 ha) and the Payns commune body of water no. 2 (1.1 ha) · .

== Population ==
Historical population
Year	Pop.	±% p.a.
1968	912	—
1975	848	−1.03%
1982	768	−1.41%
1990	867	+1.53%
1999	894	+0.34%
2007	1,142	+3.11%
2012	1,303	+2.67%
2017	1,363	+0.90%
2023	1,394	+0.38%
Source: INSEE

== Prehistory ==
Some traces were discovered through an aerial archaeological survey. At a place called La Ruelle, a protohistoric necropolis with square enclosures was photographed, thus testifying to the existence of protohistoric communities.

== Roman and Gallo-Roman eras ==
The Antonine Itinerary, “Itinerarium Antonini Augusti”, dating from the end of the 3rd century, evokes Payns because of the possibility of fording the Seine at this place. The Tabula Peutingeriana (map) also testifies to this, itself a copy of a Roman map dating from the 13th century, on which appear the 53 roads which served the Roman Empire.

== Middle Ages ==
The oldest evocation of the village of Payns is listed in the 9th century.

The archives of the department of Aube contain some Carolingian documents, in particular a cartulary from the abbey of Saint-Pierre de Montiéramey, founded around 887 by a priest named Arremar, in the middle of the vast Der forest. It mentions the sale by Hildemar to Arrémar of the "villa Pendennagio" which is none other than the village of Payns.

At the beginning of the 12th century, the stronghold of Payns was a vassal of the county of Champagne. This explains why Hugues de Payns accompanied his suzerain, Hugues de Troyes, count of Champagne to Jerusalem in 1104.

Having decided to settle there, Hugues de Payns returned to Jerusalem in 1114.

A mill has been in operation since 1236, it belonged to the priory of Foissy. Ruined by the English during the Hundred Years War, it was rented to Jean Le Bray to be rebuilt. He rented it for life for 26 livre a paper mill, two wheat and one hemp in 1476; they were in very poor condition and he had to sell the lease fairly quickly to Philippe Le Mercier and his wife Claude Le Bé. In 1531 it passed into the Largentier family, Nicolas marrying Madeleine Lemercier, daughter of the previous owners. In 1583, after a trial, the priory of Foissy gave up ownership of the mills against an annual rent of 63 livre.

== The Templar Knights ==
Hugues de Payns founded in the Holy Land, the order "Paupere Militie Christi", in modern English the Militia of the Poor Knights of Christ. After the First Crusade, the Council of Troyes fixed the rule of what had become the order "Pauperes commilitones Christi templique Salomonici Hierosalemitanis", or in modern English, the militia of the poor knights of the temple of Solomon, better known today under the order name of the Temple or the Knights Templar.

In 1998, archaeological research carried out on the site of the commandery of Payns revealed coins dated between 1035 and 1240. The Payns monetary deposit was discovered in September 1998; it is made up of 708 coins from the 12th century and 13th century. Royal coins are strongly represented: 499 deniers of monarchs from Louis VI (1108-1137) to Philip II (1180-1123). Very few local coins: only 7 deniers of the archdiocese of Reims.

== See also ==
- Communes of the Aube department
- Hugues de Payens
