= Stephen of La Ferté =

12th-century Latin Patriarch of Jerusalem

Stephen of La Ferté, also called Stephen of Chartres, was the Latin patriarch of Jerusalem from 1128 until his death in June 1130. A knight-turned-monk, Stephen started his ecclesiastical career in the Benedictine Abbey of Saint-Jean-en-Vallée in Chartres, France, and became its abbot in the 1110s. He abandoned this office to go on a pilgrimage to Jerusalem, where he was elected patriarch. He soon became embroiled in a bitter dispute with King Baldwin II of Jerusalem, his kinsman, over the possession of the cities of Jaffa and Jerusalem, which only ended when Stephen died.

== Background ==
Stephen was the son of Guerric and Helisende, the vidames of Chartres in northern France. Stephen was a blood relative of King Baldwin II of Jerusalem; the vidames of Chartres were probably related to the Le Puiset viscounts of Chartres, and the familial connection was through Baldwin's maternal family, the Montlhérys.

Stephen was well-educated and trained as a knight. In 1099 and 1102 he appears as a witness in the charters issued by Adela of Normandy, countess of Blois, and her sons. Before entering a religious life, he served as a vidame of Chartres. His family were close to the Church, and Stephen took vows as a Benedictine monk. He became a canon at the Abbey of Saint-Jean-en-Vallée (Saint John of the Valley) in Chartres, and rose to become the community's abbot sometime between 1111 and January 1115. In this role he gained a considerable experience in church administration. The chronicler William of Tyre praises Stephen's ability and moral integrity.

== Patriarchate ==
In 1127, Stephen resolved to embark on a pilgrimage to Jerusalem. Fellow abbot Bernard of Clairvaux attempted to dissuade him from abandoning his flock, but Stephen renounced the office of abbot and went anyway. Stephen was in Jerusalem waiting for a ship to return home when, on 27 July 1128, the Latin patriarch of Jerusalem, Warmund of Picquigny, died. He was then unanimously elected to succeed Warmund as patriarch. In addition to being a kinsman of King Baldwin II, Stephen may have been related also to Gilduin of Le Puiset, abbot of Saint Mary of the Valley of Jehosaphat. Stephen was likely appointed patriarch because of his kinship with the king. Stephen had been enthroned by 19 October.

Patriarch Warmund had been a close friend of King Baldwin, and Stephen too initially cooperated with his kinsman. They established the bishopric of Sebastia to serve the region of Samaria as a suffragan of the archbishopric of Caesarea. The patriarch likewise organized the Order of the Knights Templar, which received recognition from Pope Honorius II in 1128. He significantly altered the Latin Rule, adding 24 new chapters and modifying 12; Barber sees in this an example of Stephen's endeavor to expand his authority. After an assembly of lords decided to offer King Baldwin's eldest daughter and presumptive heir, Melisende, in marriage to Count Fulk V of Anjou, Patriarch Stephen approved the choice.

Stephen's relationship with Baldwin collapsed after Stephen demanded that the city of Jaffa be handed over to the patriarchate; he demanded the city of Jerusalem too once Ascalon had been conquered. It is probable that, while working on the reorganization of the ecclesiastical structure of the kingdom, Stephen found out that the first Latin patriarch of Jerusalem, Dagobert of Pisa, had raised these claims in 1100. Baldwin rejected them just as the first Latin ruler of Jerusalem, Godfrey of Bouillon, had rejected Dagobert's. There are no indications that Stephen sought the support of the papacy in his contest with the king; William's chronicle suggests that Stephen's endeavour to establish a suzerainty of the Church over the kingdom was his own initiative.

The historian Bernard Hamilton estimates that the patriarchate, "though perhaps not the kingdom", would have flourished under Stephen had his pontificate lasted longer. Stephen's quarrel with Baldwin ended abruptly upon Stephen's premature death on 12 June 1130. Baldwin was widely suspected of having had Stephen poisoned, a charge which was common in such circumstances and unlikely to have been true. The king came to visit the dying patriarch and inquired how he was; the patriarch replied: "Sire, I am faring as you desire." Baldwin then secured the election of a more malleable patriarch, William of Messines, who had become prior of the Holy Sepulchre during Stephen's ponfiticate.

== Bibliography ==
- Barber, Malcolm (27 July 1995). Crusaders and Heretics, Twelfth to Fourteenth Centuries. Routledge. ISBN 978-1-04-024715-0.
- Barber, Malcolm (2012). The Crusader States. Yale University Press. ISBN 978-0300189315.
- Hamilton, Bernard (1980). The Latin Church in the Crusader States: The Secular Church. Variorum Publications. ISBN 978-1-351-88705-2.
- Mayer, Hans Eberhard (1985). "The Succession to Baldwin II of Jerusalem: English Impact on the East". Dumbarton Oaks Papers. 39. Dumbarton Oaks: 139–147. doi:10.2307/1291522. JSTOR 1291522.
- Hamilton, Bernard; Jotischky, Andrew (2020). Derek Baker (ed.). Latin and Greek Monasticism in the Crusader States. Cambridge University Press. ISBN 978-0521836388.
- Jotischky, Andrew (1 November 2010). Perfection of Solitude: Hermits and Monks in the Crusader States. Penn State Press. ISBN 978-0-271-04266-4.
- LoPrete, Kimberly A. (2007). Adela of Blois: Countess and Lord (c.1067-1137). Four Courts Press. ISBN 978-1-85182-563-9.
- Murray, Alan V. (2022). Baldwin of Bourcq: Count of Edessa and King of Jerusalem, 1100-1131. Rulers of the Latin East. Routledge. ISBN 9780367545307.
- Riley-Smith, Jonathan (1997). The First Crusaders, 1095-1131. Cambridge University Press. ISBN 978-0-521-64603-1.
- Robinson, I. S. (19 July 1990). The Papacy, 1073-1198: Continuity and Innovation. Cambridge University Press. ISBN 978-0-521-31922-5.
- Runciman, Steven (1952). A History of the Crusades: The Kingdom of Jerusalem and the Frankish East, 1100–1187. Vol. 2. Cambridge University Press. OCLC 1284066.
- Thompson, Amy Livingstone (1992). Nobility of Blois-Chartres: Family and Inheritance, 980-1140. Michigan State University. Department of History.

Preceded by Warmund of Picquigny	Latin Patriarch of Jerusalem; 1128-1130	Succeeded by William of Malines
