= Paulinus of Tyre =

Early bishop of Tyre and patriach of Antioch

Paulinus of Tyre (fl. early 4th century, died c. 324/329) was a Christian bishop who served as Bishop of Tyre and later became Patriarch of Antioch for a brief tenure. He is known for rebuilding the great church of Tyre after the death of Maximinus Daza (313), as it was destroyed during the Diocletianic Persecution. The project was praised by his contemporary Eusebius of Caesarea as was his involvement in the early stages of the Arian controversy

== Early life and background ==
Paulinus was likely a native of Antioch, based on an equivocal remark by Eusebius of Caesarea.

== Arian controversy ==
In the early fourth century, the theological differences between Arius, a presbyter from Cyrenaica, and Athenasius, a theologian, and eventually a patriarch, from Alexandria, came to a head. The main point of contention was that Arius embraced a subordinationist Christology which taught that Jesus was the divine Son (Logos) of God, was created before time, but was not eterna, and not of the same essence of the Father, as opposed to Athenasius who believed that Father and Son were of the same substance, but that God had to become human so that humans may ascend to divinity. Paulinus is often thought of as one of the supporters of Arianism, though it is unclear if this is true, and it is possible that in agreement with his moderate nature, he did not take a side in the dispute.

Because the controversy divided the Christian world and threatened the stability of the Roman empire, Roman Emperor Constantine the Great convened the Council of Nicea in 325 CE which formulated the Nicene Creed which supported the position of Athenasius. According to Michel Le Quien, Paulinus died the previous year, in 324, and therefore it was his successor as Patriach of Antioch, Eustathius of Antioch who attended the Council.

== Restoration of the church of Tyre ==
After the end of the Diocletianic Persecution and the death of the last persecutor Maximinus Daza in 313, Paulinus famously restored the Church in Tyre. Although the church was built as a basilica and included a number of imperial themes, Eusebius in his Ecclesiastical History attributed its building to Paulinus alone. As the emperor and the imperial bureaucrats of the time were not mentioned by Eusebius, who would normally highlight their involvement, some academics have inferred that the funding for the church came from the coffers of the congregation of Tyre.
