= Godfrey de Saint-Omer =

Flemish knight and founding member of the Knights Templar

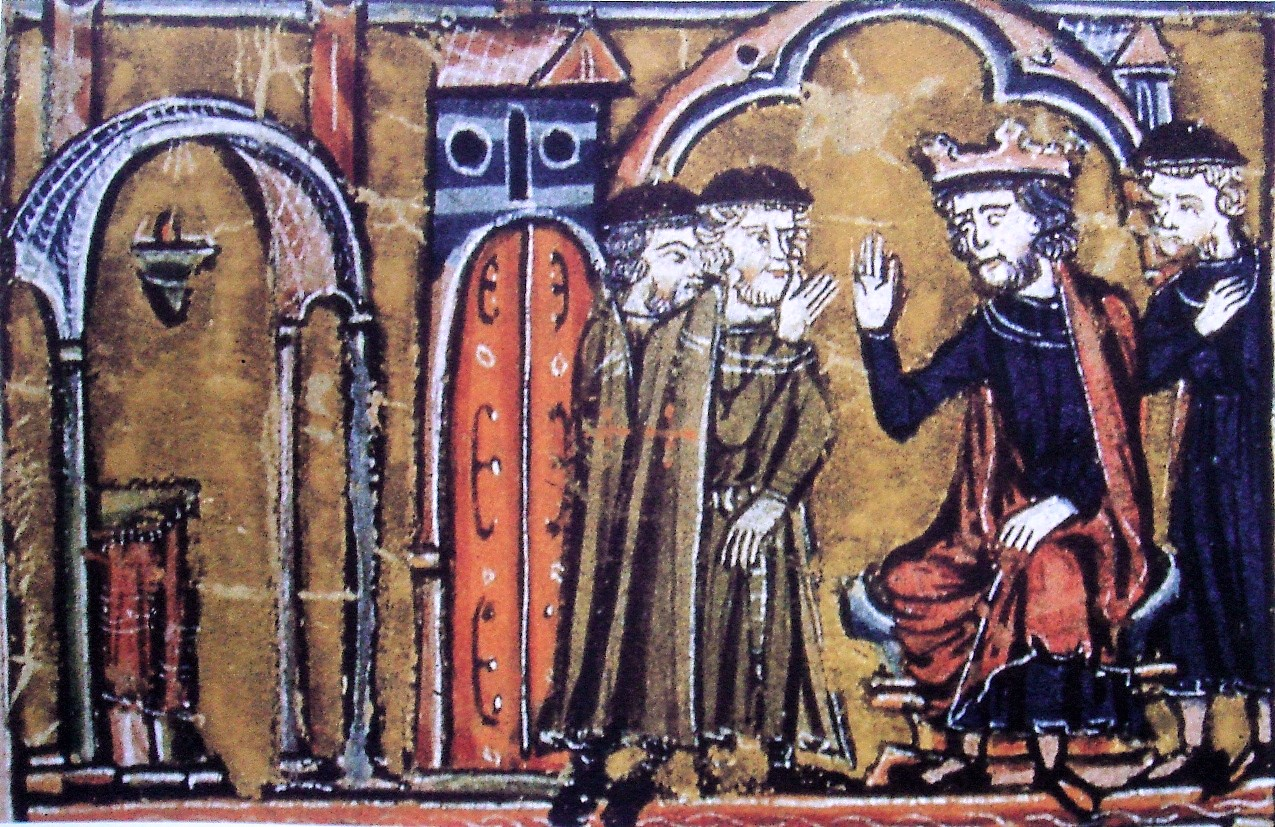
King Baldwin II of Jerusalem, assigning the captured Al Aqsa Mosque to Hugues de Payens and Godfrey, to use as their headquarters. The Crusaders called the structure the Temple of Solomon, and it was from this location that the Order took its name, as Templars

Godfrey of Saint-Omer (also known as Gaufred, Godefroi, or Geoffrey de St Omer, Saint Omer) was a Flemish knight and one of the founding members of the Knights Templar in 1119.

He is said to have come from the family of the Lords of Saint-Omer (in today's northern France), possibly the son of William I, Lord of Saint Omer and Melisende de Piquigny.

There are conflicting reports as to Godfrey's relationship to William and Hugh of Fauquembergues. Chronologically Godfrey may have been Hugh's brother but it is also said that he was Hugh's son. On the list of crusaders, a Gauthier de Saint-Omer is listed, which could be a mistake for Gaufred (Gauthier de Saint-Omer was not yet born). Therefore, Godfrey probably came to Jerusalem in 1099 with William I and Hugh.

According to legend, Hugues de Payens (the first Grand-Master of the Templars) and Godfrey were so poor that between the two of them they had only one horse, and this gave rise to the famous image on the seal of the Templars, of two men riding a single horse.
