= Cassius and Castus =

African bishop-martyrs

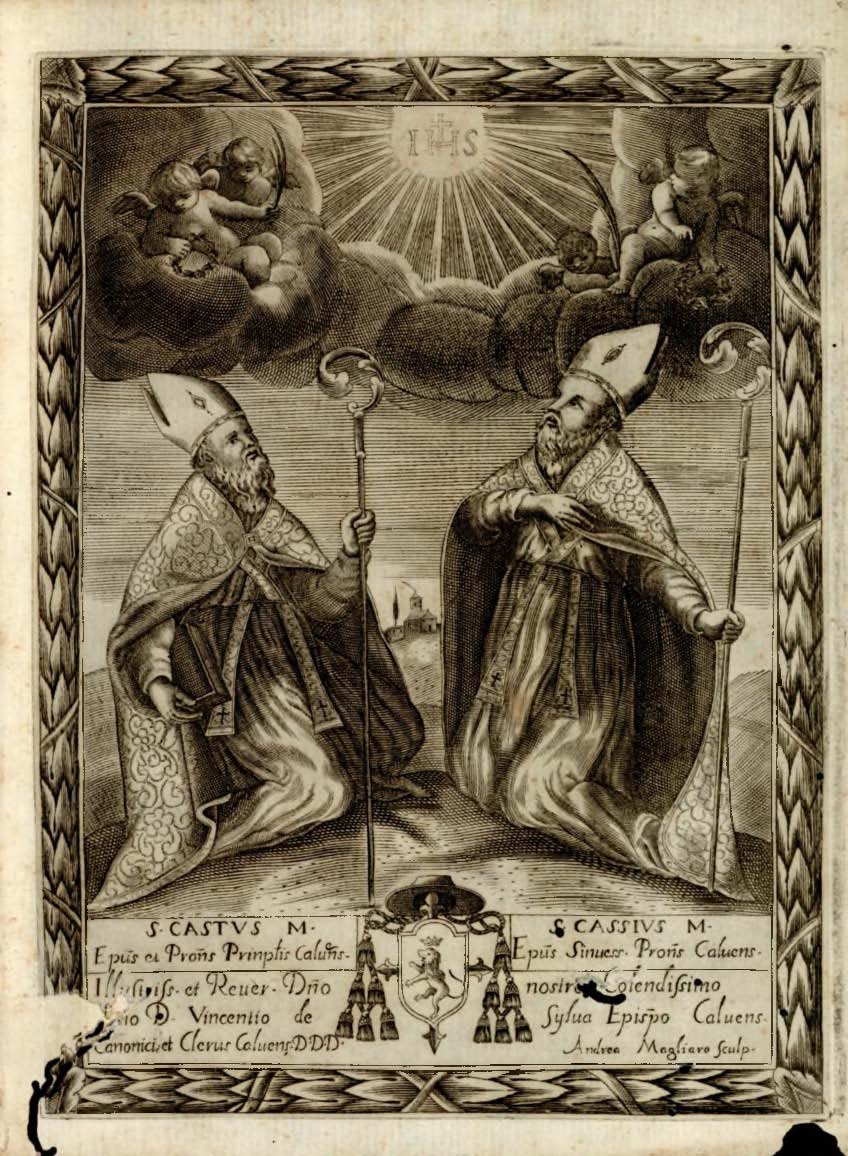
Frontispiece to Mollo's 1685 Life and Passion of the Glorious Martyrs Saint Castus Bishop of Calvi and Saint Cassius Bishop of Sinuessa

Cassius and Castus (Italian: Cassio e Casto; died 66 AD) were two African bishop-martyrs, particularly venerated in Benevento, Calvi, Capua, Sora, Gaeta and other nearby towns in Campania and Lazio. Their feast day is 22 May, shared with Castus and Emilius.

Castus is held to have been Bishop of Calvi and Cassius Bishop of Sinuessa. They are mentioned in an ancient inscription found on the site of Calvi Risorta Co-Cathedral, which calls them martyrs, refers to their power to bring about miracles for the blind, lame and other illnesses and calls Castus "God's favourite".

== Narrative ==
Their martyrology holds that the pagan priests feared Castus might destroy their religion and so accused him before Messalinus, Prefect of Campania. He ordered him beaten with rods and sticks near Acquaviva delle Fonti and then to be burned alive with Cassius. However, they both miraculously escaped from the flames, which Messalinus put down to magic and thus took them to a temple of Apollo, possibly to offer incense to the god. A crowd gathered there, but the temple collapsed, killing Messalinus and all of the crowd except Cassius and Castus. The two bishops were then taken to Sinuessa, stoned and finally thrust through with a sword. Castus' body was buried at Calvi Cathedral.

== Sources ==
They are the subject of a legendary passio, which survives as readings for their feast-day at Capua. It seems in turn to be derived from a lost passio by Peter the Deacon and written at Monte Cassino Abbey by Gregory of Terracina in his youth, placing the lost work towards the end of the 11th century, almost exactly contemporary with the construction date for Calvi's first cathedral, dedicated to Castus. They are both also cited by in Bollandist Acta Sanctorum.

Both martyrs are also the subject of Vita e passione Delli Gloriosi Martiri Santo Casto vescovo di Calvi, e Santo Cassio Vescovo di Sinuessa. Con alcune notizie della Città di Calvi, e de suoi Vescovi, & altre antiche memorie. (Life and passion of the glorious martyrs Saint Castus bishop of Calvi and Saint Cassius bishop of Sinuessa. With other notes on the City of Calvi, and on its bishops, and other ancient memories), a text by the priest-scholar Giuseppe Cerbone, an apostolic protonotary, theologian and synodical examiner to the Episcopal Court of the Diocese of Calvi. The work was dedicated to Vincenzo De Silva bishop of Calvi and published by Francesco Mollo in 1685.

== In art ==
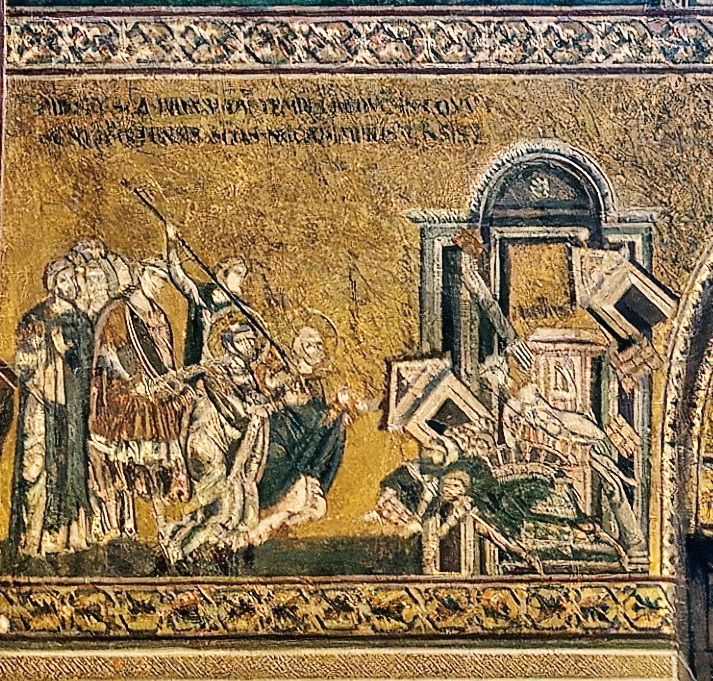

Cassius and Castus are depicted in mosaics in the Monreale Cathedral.
