= Santa Maria Assunta Co-Cathedral =

Roman Catholic church

Santa Maria Assunta Co-Cathedral (Italian - concattedrale di Santa Maria Assunta) is the main Roman Catholic church in the Campanian town of Calvi Risorta and co-cathedral of the Diocese of Teano-Calvi.

== History ==
First built at the end of the 9th century, the church has under its altar the relics of Castus, the first Bishop of Calvi. Giuseppe Maria Capece Zurlo added two marble staircases to the altar and to the crypt and the whole building was paved with painted maiolica tiles in 1778 and a year later paintings by Angelo Mozzillo were added to the sacristy, showing all the bishops of Calvi surrounded by Pompeii-style floral motifs.

Towards the end of the first half of the 18th century, the Romanesque church was modified in the Baroque style, with robust pillars replacing columns, a coffered vault added to the original ceiling and a marble inlay rood screen added to split the choir from the nave. The three semi-circular apses are the best-surviving pre-Baroque elements, with two half-columns surviving to their full height.

The façade includes a reused ancient Roman ionic capital, while 21 granite columns support the crypt, each with a different capital salvaged from ancient Cales
