= William I of Tyre =

12th-century English archbishop

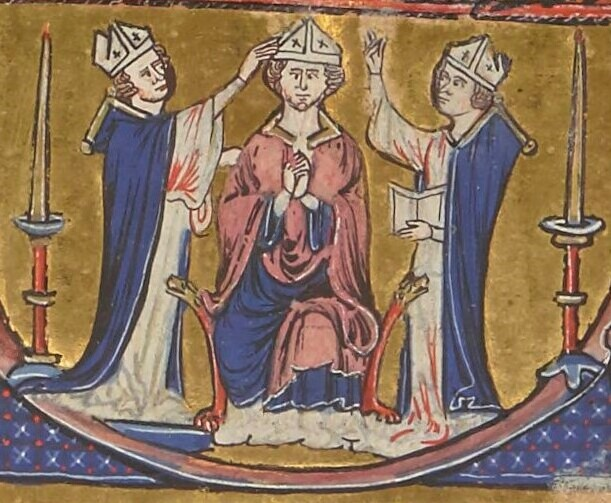
Consecration of William

William I was the second Latin archbishop of Tyre from 1128 until 1134 or 1135. He was originally from England and served as prior of the Church of the Holy Sepulchre before his appointment as archbishop.

A certain Odo had been consecrated archbishop of Tyre in 1122 while the city was under Seljuq control. He died before the city was captured during the Venetian Crusade of 1124, but no new archbishop was immediately appointed. In the spring of 1128, Patriarch Warmund consecrated William as archbishop. Against Warmund's wishes, he travelled to Rome to receive his pallium directly from Pope Honorius II, which no other archbishop from the Latin East had ever done.

In 1111, Pope Paschal II had ruled that only those parts of the ecclesiastical province of Tyre that lay within the Kingdom of Jerusalem were under the jurisdiction of the archbishop, thus removing from his jurisdiction the suffragan sees of Tripoli, Tortosa and Gibelet, which lay within the Principality of Antioch. These were placed under the jurisdiction of the patriarch of Antioch. William chose to go to Rome in 1128 to receive his pallium because of the opportunity to petition the new pope to restore his authority over Tripoli, Tortosa and Gibelet. Bishop Roger of Lydda accompanied him to Rome and the two were also carrying out a mission for King Baldwin II.

In Rome, William was successful in both missions. Honorius ordered all the bishops of the province of Tyre to obey the archbishop and confirmed that the entire province lay within the patriarchate of Jerusalem. He and Roger were also successful in their secular mission, helping arrange the marriage of Melisende, heiress of Jerusalem, to Count Fulk V of Anjou.

Honorius sent a legate, Cardinal Giles of Tusculum, to the east to enforce his new ruling, but Patriarch Bernard of Antioch ignored it. Since no suffragan dioceses were set up in the Kingdom of Jerusalem during Warmund's life and his actual suffragans remained loyal to Antioch, William started out as a metropolitan without suffragans.

In 1129, William confirmed the former Greek Orthodox cathedral of Saint Mary in Tyre to the canons of the Holy Sepulchre, which had acquired it before he became archbishop. Probably he had his own cathedral in a new church dedicated to the Holy Cross. Whether the later cathedral of Tyre was begun during his reign is not known. In 1130, William's successor as prior of the Holy Sepulchre, William of Malines, was appointed patriarch of Jerusalem. He set about creating new suffragan dioceses for Tyre: at Beirut (1133), Sidon (1133) and Acre (1135).

== Sources ==
- Hamilton, Bernard (2016) [1980]. The Latin Church in the Crusader States: The Secular Church. Routledge. ISBN 9780860780724.
- Mayer, Hans E. (1985). "The Succession to Baldwin II of Jerusalem: English Impact on the East". Dumbarton Oaks Papers. 39: 139–147. doi:10.2307/1291522. JSTOR 1291522.
- Pringle, Denys (2001). "The Crusader Cathedral of Tyre". Levant. 33 (1): 165–188. doi:10.1179/lev.2001.33.1.165. S2CID 162383678.
- William of Tyre (1943). A History of Deeds Done Beyond the Sea. Translated by E. A. Babcock; A. C. Krey. Columbia University Press.

Catholic Church titles
Preceded by Odo as titular archbishop	Archbishop of Tyre; 1128-1135	Succeeded by Fulcher of Angoulême
