= Aschetinus =

Roman Catholic bishop

Aschetinus or Anschetin (died before 1128) was the first Roman Catholic bishop of Bethlehem in the Kingdom of Jerusalem from 1108 until his death.

== Early life ==
In medieval Latin documents, he is mentioned under various names, mainly variants of the forms Aschetinus and Anschetinus. These forms can be traced back to the Old Norse name Asketill. The two Latin forms were popular among the Normans of southern Italy, implying that he was born in this region. If this assumption is true, Aschetinus likely accompanied the Italo-Norman prince Bohemond during the First Crusade in 1096. He started his church career as cantor of the Church of the Holy Sepulchre in Jerusalem. Before 1108, he was named the prior (head) of the Augustine canons of the Church of the Nativity in Bethlehem.

== Titular bishop of Ascalon ==
King Baldwin I of Jerusalem who had been crowned in the Church of the Nativity decided to elevate it into an episcopal see. (Note: Before the conquest by the crusaders, Bethlehem had not been an episcopal see, so the Church of the Nativity was only an important shrine.) For this purpose, he approached Pope Paschal II who charged the papal legate Archbishop Ghibbelin of Arles with discussing the issue with the King. By the time Ghibelin reached the Holy Land in 1108, Aschetinus had been made the bishop of Ascalon. As Ascalon was still under Muslim rule, Aschetinus could only be regarded as a titular bishop.

== Bishop of Bethlehem ==
Ghibbelin as papal legate transferred Aschetinus's see from Ascalon to Bethlehem, establishing the Roman Catholic Diocese of Bethlehem in 1108. His appointment made Aschetinus one of the three local canons to be raised to bishopric in the Jerusalemite kingdom. (Note: Joscius was canon of Acre before he was appointed to the see of Acre in 1172; Odo, canon of Tyre was made bishop of Sidon in 1176.) As bishop of Bethlehem, he was a suffragan of the Latin patriarch of Jerusalem and due to his see's vicinity to Jerusalem, he was closely associated with the patriarchal court. In 1120, he participated in the Council of Nablus, which established the first set of laws in the Kingdom of Jerusalem, and in 1124 was one of the signatories of the Pactum Warmundi with the Republic of Venice.

== Sources ==
- Hamilton, Bernard (2016) [1980]. The Latin Church in the Crusader States: The Secular Church. Routledge. ISBN 978-0-86078-072-4.
- Hamilton, Bernard; Jotischky, Andrew (2020). Latin and Greek Monasticism in the Crusader States. Cambridge University Press. ISBN 978-0-521-83638-8.
- Murray, Alan V. (2000). The Crusader Kingdom of Jerusalem: A Dynastic History, 1099–1125. Prosopographica et Geneologica. ISBN 978-1-9009-3403-9.
