= Rule of the Master =

Set of sixth-century Christian religious rules

The Regula Magistri or Rule of the Master is an anonymous sixth-century collection of monastic precepts. The text of the Rule of the Master is found in the Concordia Regularum of Benedict of Aniane, who gave it its name.

== History ==
The Rule of the Master was written two or three decades before Benedict of Nursia's the Rule of Saint Benedict. Unlike the Rules of Pachomius, which are a collection of regulations, instructions, and prohibitions concerning the life of the community, the Rule of the Master contains precise regulations but also a theological and spiritual reflection showing the reason for the regulations. The Rule of the Master consisted of an introduction followed by ninety-five chapters. Over twenty chapters are devoted to the Divine Office.

The four-part introduction comprises a prologue, the parable of the spring, a commentary on the Lord's Prayer and the commentary on the Psalms. The format follows the literary convention of a series of questions. The first part, through Chapter 10, discusses spiritual doctrine, the latter portion, monastic discipline.

In the Parable of the Spring, the Master invokes Christ's appeal in Matthew 11:29 to "Take my yoke upon you and learn from me, for I am meek and humble of heart ...". Adalbert de Vogüé points out that the Master viewed the monastery as a school where one learns from Christ. The first part of the Rule is characterized by the abbot's function to teach.

One of the writings that influenced the Master was Saint Augustine's Letter 211, which was sent to a community of women founded by Augustine in the city of Hippo. Augustine's writings were well known in the West in the sixth century (though unknown in the East until several centuries later) and his texts on religious or monastic life were considered standard. The writings of John Cassian are also indicated.

== Influence ==
The Regula Magistri is three times as long as Benedict's rule. It was used by St Benedict as source material for his own "Rule". The structure of the Rules is similar, and there are parallel passages.

However, Benedict did not simply copy the Regula Magistri. He deleted some sections, and adapted others based on his own experience, placing more emphasis on fraternal love. Benedict's Rule demonstrates a more positive view of human nature than the Master. There is no historical record of the Regula Magistri having ever been used by any particular monastic community.

== See also ==
- Rule of Saint Augustine
- Rule of Saint Basil
- Columban Rule
- Rule of Saint Benedict
- Rule of St. Albert
- Latin Rule
