= Pactum Warmundi =

1123 alliance between Venice and Jerusalem

- The Near East in 1135. Muslim states are in greens, other colours indicate Christian states.
- Signed: 1123
- Negotiators: (Kingdom of Jerusalem) Warmund, Patriarch; (Republic of Venice) Domenico Michele, Doge

The Pactum Warmundi was a treaty of alliance established in 1123 between the Crusader Kingdom of Jerusalem and the Republic of Venice.

== Background ==
In 1123, King Baldwin II was taken prisoner by the Artuqids, and the Kingdom of Jerusalem was subsequently invaded by the Fatimids of Egypt. The Doge of Venice, Domenico Michele, set sail with a large fleet, which defeated the Egyptian fleet off the coast of Syria and captured many ships. The Venetians then landed at Acre; the Doge completed a pilgrimage to Jerusalem, where he celebrated Christmas, and met with Warmund, Patriarch of Jerusalem, and the Constable William Buris, governing Jerusalem in place of Baldwin II. It was agreed that the Venetian fleet would help the crusaders attack either Tyre or Ascalon, the only two cities on the coast still under Muslim control; the barons from the south of the Kingdom wanted to attack Ascalon, while those in the north preferred to direct the fleet against Tyre, which was larger and wealthier and a valuable port for enemy Damascus further inland. According to William of Tyre, "The matter came near resulting in a dangerous quarrel." Tyre was chosen by lot.

== Treaty ==
A treaty of alliance was established between Jerusalem and the Venetians prior to the beginning of the siege of Tyre in February 1124 (the city capitulated to the crusaders later that year). The treaty was negotiated by Warmund, Patriarch of Jerusalem, and thus it is known as the Pactum Warmundi (Warmundus being the Latin form of his name). Earlier treaties had been negotiated between Jerusalem and the Venetians and other Italian city-states, and the Venetians themselves had been granted privileges in 1100 and 1110 in return for military assistance, but this treaty was far more extensive. The Pactum granted the Venetians their own church, street, square, baths, market, scales, mill, and oven in every city controlled by the King of Jerusalem, except in Jerusalem itself, where their autonomy was more limited. In the other cities, they were permitted to use their own Venetian scales to conduct business and trade when trading with other Venetians, but otherwise they were to use the scales and prices established by the King. In Acre, they were granted a quarter of the city, where every Venetian "may be as free as in Venice itself." In Tyre and Ascalon (though neither had yet been captured), they were granted one-third of the city and one-third of the surrounding countryside, possibly as many as 21 villages in the case of Tyre. These privileges were entirely free from taxation, but Venetian ships would be taxed if they were carrying pilgrims, and in this case the King would personally be entitled to one-third of the tax. For their help in the siege of Tyre, the Venetians were entitled to 300 "Saracen besants" per year from the revenue of that city. They were permitted to use their own laws in civil suits between Venetians or in cases in which a Venetian was the defendant, but if a Venetian was the plaintiff the matter would be decided in the courts of the Kingdom. If a Venetian was shipwrecked or died in the kingdom, his property would be sent back to Venice rather than being confiscated by the King. Anyone living in the Venetian quarter in Acre or the Venetian districts in other cities would be subject to Venetian law.

The Pactum was signed by Patriarch Warmund; Ehremar, Archbishop of Caesarea; Bernard, Bishop of Nazareth; Aschetinus, Bishop of Bethlehem; Roger, Bishop of Lydda; Guildin, abbot of St. Mary of Josaphat; Gerard, prior of the Holy Sepulchre; Aicard, prior of the Templum Domini; Arnold, Prior of Mount Sion; William Buris; and the chancellor, Pagan. Aside from William and Pagan, no secular authorities witnessed the treaty, perhaps indicating that the Venetians considered Jerusalem a papal fief.

== Results of the treaty ==
Baldwin II ratified the Pactum upon his release from captivity in 1125, although he refused to recognize the Venetian communes as fully autonomous entities within the Kingdom; he asserted his feudal rights by asking for the service of three Venetian knights. The treaty seems to have been in force up to the fall of the kingdom in 1291, and the Venetian communes in Acre and Tyre were particularly powerful and influential in the 13th century after the kingdom lost Jerusalem and was reduced to a coastal state. They resisted Emperor Frederick II's attempts to claim the Kingdom, and virtually ignored the authority of the Lord of Tyre. Instead, they conducted their affairs as if they controlled their own independent lordship — which, essentially, they did, thanks to the terms of the Pactum.

Other Italian and Provençal city-states demanded and were granted similar commercial treaties by the King of Jerusalem throughout the 12th and 13th centuries, notably the Genoese and Pisans. The communes established by these treaties were in a sense an early form of European colonialism, and were an important step in the commercial development of the Italian city-states that culminated in the Italian Renaissance in the following centuries.

The text of the treaty is preserved in the chronicle of William of Tyre, who must have taken it from a surviving copy in Tyre; Fulcher of Chartres, a contemporary, barely mentions the treaty at all. The text was also published in Urkunden zur ältern Handels und Staatsgeschichte der Republik Venedig by G.L.F. Tafel and G.M. Thomas in 1856.

== See also ==
- Venetian Crusade
- List of treaties

== Sources ==
- Prawer, Joshua (2001) [1972]. The Latin Kingdom of Jerusalem: European Colonialism in the Middle Ages. Phoenix Press. ISBN 1-84212-224-X.
- Prawer, Joshua (1980). Crusader Institutions. Oxford University Press. ISBN 0-19-822536-9.
- Runciman, Steven (1994) [1952]. A History of the Crusades, Vol. II: The Kingdom of Jerusalem and the Frankish East, 1100–1187. Folio Society edition.
- Norwich, John Julius (1982). A History of Venice. New York City: Alfred A. Knopf. ISBN 978-0141-01383-1.
- William of Tyre (trans. E.A. Babcock and A.C. Krey) (1943). A History of Deeds Done Beyond the Sea. Columbia University Press.
