= Fulcher of Angoulême =

Roman Catholic archbishop (died 1157)

Fulk (or Fulcher) of Angoulême was the Latin patriarch of Jerusalem from 1146 to his death in 1157.

Fulk came from Angoulême. According to William of Tyre, he was "religious and God-fearing, possessed of little learning, but a faithful man and a lover of discipline." In France he had been abbot of Cellefrouin, and came to Jerusalem during the papal schism between Innocent II and Anacletus II in 1131, as the bishop of Angoulême favoured Anacletus and Fulk favoured Innocent. In Jerusalem he served as a canon of the Church of the Holy Sepulchre, and in 1134 he succeeded William I, an Englishman and former prior of the Holy Sepulchre, as archbishop of Tyre.

He was consecrated by William of Malines, patriarch of Jerusalem, but travelled to Rome to be given the pallium by Innocent II; Patriarch William was offended and treated Fulk poorly after he returned. Innocent II rebuked William, and threatened to place Tyre directly under the authority of Rome, or transfer it to the Latin patriarch of Antioch. This was part of the ongoing controversy over which patriarchate Tyre should be subject to; prior to the Muslim conquest of the Holy Land, Tyre had been subject to Antioch, but when Tyre was recaptured by the crusaders in 1124, it became a suffragan of Jerusalem, which was more politically dominant than Antioch. The dispute was resolved with Tyre remaining under the jurisdiction of Jerusalem.

In 1139 Fulk participated in the siege of Baniyas, and was present at a synod in Antioch in December of that year.

Patriarch William of Malines died in 1145, and on 25 January 1146 Fulk became patriarch of Jerusalem. There was a dispute over the succession in Tyre between Ralph the Englishman, the chancellor of Jerusalem, and Peter of Barcelona; Ralph was never consecrated and Peter eventually succeeded to the archbishopric.

In 1148 Fulk was among those who welcomed Conrad III of Germany when he arrived in Jerusalem on the Second Crusade. He was also sent to meet Louis VII of France, who had stopped in Antioch; Fulk persuaded Louis to continue to Jerusalem rather than remain in Antioch or Tripoli, both of which were ruled by his relatives. In June, Fulk attended the Council of Acre, where the decision was made to attack Damascus, which led to the failure of the Second Crusade.

In 1149 Fulk consecrated the newly renovated Holy Sepulchre, which had been undergoing reorganization and expansion during the previous 50 years of crusader rule. The church's Romanesque style inspired numerous churches in Europe.

In 1152, Fulk intervened in the dispute between Queen Melisende and her son King Baldwin III, who wished to assume rule upon reaching the age of majority in 1148. The dispute led to armed conflict in 1152, and Fulk's attempts to negotiate peace failed. Baldwin eventually was victorious in the dispute.

In 1153 Fulk was present at the Siege of Ascalon, where he carried the relic of the True Cross. In 1155 he was involved in a dispute with the Knights Hospitaller, who refused to pay tithes to the church; they also interrupted Fulk's preaching at the Holy Sepulchre, and at one point, according to William of Tyre, shot arrows into the church. Fulk and the other ecclesiastical prelates of Outremer travelled to Rome to complain directly to Pope Hadrian IV.

In 1156 Fulk opposed the marriage of Amalric, count of Jaffa and Ascalon, and Agnes of Courtenay, on the grounds of consanguinity. Fulk died on 20 November 1157. William describes him as "a very aged man, indeed almost a centenarian."

Catholic Church titles
Preceded by William I	Archbishop of Tyre; 1134/1135-1146	Vacant Ralph as unconsecrated archbishop Title next held by Peter of Barcelona
Preceded by William of Malines	Patriarch of Jerusalem; 1146–1157	Succeeded by Amalric of Nesle
