= Pagan (chancellor) =

Pagan (died before October 19, 1129) was the first chancellor of the Kingdom of Jerusalem from around 1115. He was made archbishop of Caesarea before September 1129.

Born in a Norman family in southern Italy, Pagan most probably started his career as a lay notary in his homeland. He and his kinsman, Bardo, came to Jerusalem in the entourage of Adelaide del Vasto in 1113. Adelaide had administered the realm of her minor son, Roger II of Sicily, from 1101 to 1111. Baldwin I of Jerusalem, who had always been short of money, married the wealthy widow in 1113, promising to name her son as his successor. Pagan was made the first chancellor of the kingdom in 1115. He appointed Bardo as a lay notary in the chancery.

Pagan were among the prelates and barons who adopted laws against adultery, sodomy, bigamy, procuring and prohibit sexual relations between Christians and Saracens at the Council of Nablus on 15 January 1120. Other laws secured the Church right to collect the tithe and authorize clergymen to bear arms in their defense. He accompanied Baldwin II of Jerusalem to Antioch in August 1122, consequently those who needed a royal charter were to travel to north Syria to meet with him. He returned to the kingdom only in December 1122. He played a more active role in the politics from the 1120s, leaving the actual administrative work to Hemelin, who was made vice-chancellor around 1124. Along with Warmund of Picquigny, the Latin Patriarch of Jerusalem, and William I of Bures, Pagan conducted negotiations with the Doge of Venice, Domenico Michiel, about the joint conquest of Tyre at Christmas 1123.

Pagan was made archbishop of Caesarea before September 1129. His successor as archbishop, Gaudentius, was first mentioned in a charter on 19 October 1129, showing that Pagan had died. Hemelin succeeded him as chancellor.

== Sources ==
- Barber, Malcolm (2012). The Crusader States. Yale University Press. ISBN 978-0-300-11312-9.
- Murray, Alan V. (2000). The Crusader Kingdom of Jerusalem: A Dynastic History, 1099–1125. Prosopographica et Geneologica. ISBN 978-1-9009-3403-9.
