= Maurice of Porto =

Maurice (Latin Mauritius, Italian Maurizio) was the cardinal-bishop of Porto e Santa Rufina from between 1095 and 1099 until 1102. Following the success of the First Crusade, he was the apostolic legate in the Holy Land from 1100 until his death in 1102. From late 1101 he was also the acting patriarch of Jerusalem.

Nothing is known concerning Maurice's life before he became a cardinal. According to the modern papal historian Gaetano Moroni, he was consecrated a cardinal by Pope Urban II in 1088, but a bishop John is still recorded at Porto as late as 18 February 1095. Moroni, following Ferdinando Ughelli, also records that Maurice consecrated an altar dedicated to Saint Mammes in the church of Santa Cecilia in Trastevere on 24 February 1098. The primary source for this claim is lost. The earliest conclusive attestation of Maurice as bishop comes from the Liber pontificalis, which records him among the six cardinal-bishops who on 14 August 1099 consecrated Pope Paschal II.

On 4 May 1100, Paschal appointed Maurice as his legate to the Holy Land, responsible for bringing the church in the new Crusader states more firmly under papal control. He left for Genoa, where in July he assisted in the consecration of the church of San Teodoro. He left with a Genoese army aboard a Genoese ship on 1 August, arriving outside Latakia no later than 25 September. There, probably in mid-October, he joined the entourage of Count Baldwin of Edessa and accompanied it to Jerusalem. On 25 December, Baldwin was crowned King of Jerusalem by Patriarch Daimbert of Jerusalem.

Following his coronation, Baldwin accused the patriarch before the legate of having betrayed the Crusaders and trying to have him (Baldwin) killed. The sources do not agree on how Maurice responded to these accusations. According to Albert of Aachen, whose account is based on reports, the legate forbade Daimbert from officiating at the celebration of Easter and Maurice himself led the ceremonies. Caffaro di Rustico, a Genoese soldier who had travelled to the Holy Land in the same fleet as Maurice and was an eyewitness to these events, claims that Daimbert, with both Maurice and Baldwin present, preached a sermon at Easter in the Church of the Holy Sepulchre on 21 April 1101.

The rivalry between Baldwin and Daimbert continued over the next year, with Maurice acting as a mediator with the goal of preserving Daimbert's position. Eventually, however, it had become untenable and the legate deposed the patriarch, assuming his duties ad interim in the fall of 1101. This situation lasted only until Maurice's death in the spring of 1102. By the fall he had been succeeded as legate by Cardinal Robert of Paris. By 29 July 1103 he had been succeeded as bishop of Porto by another John.
