= Evremar =

12th century French priest

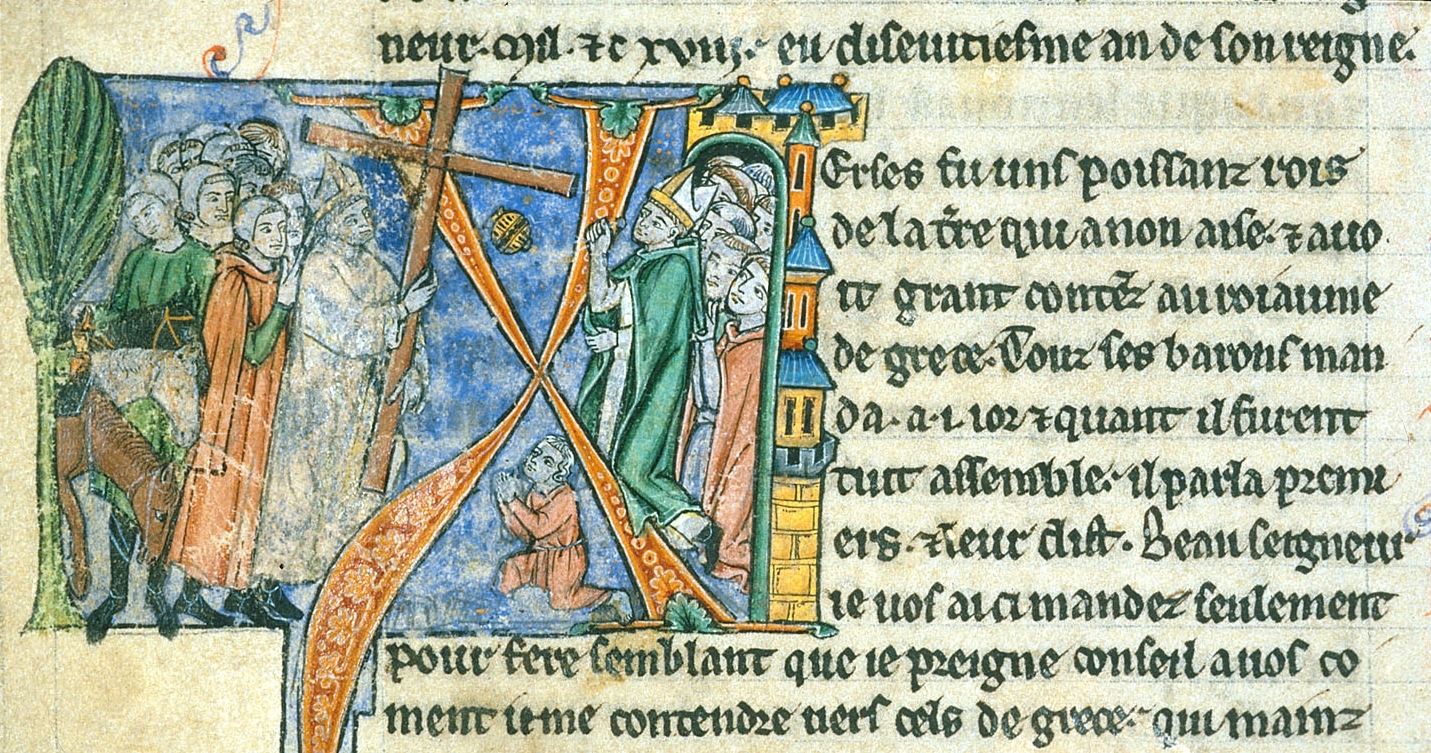
Evremar taking the True Cross to Antioch from William of Tyre's Histoire d'Outremer, in the care of the British Museum

Evremar (also Ebramar or Ehremar) was Latin Patriarch of Jerusalem from 1102 to 1105 or 1107, and then Archbishop of Caesarea.

Evremar was a priest from Thérouanne in France who in old age went east with the First Crusade. In 1102 Dagobert of Pisa was deposed as Patriarch by the papal legate, Cardinal Robert of Paris, on charges of misconduct brought by the King of Jerusalem, Baldwin I. When the legate asked for a candidate to be the new patriarch, the Palestinian bishops suggested Evremar, who was known for his piety and charity. Baldwin was happy to accept the appointment as he knew that Evremar, unlike Dagobert, would not set the claims of the church against his power as king.

In 1104, Baldwin accepted the surrender of Acre on a promise that the Moslem residents would be allowed to leave safely with their property, but Genoese sailors ignored the promise and murdered and robbed them. Baldwin was furious and would have attacked the Genoese but Evremar patched up a reconciliation. Shortly afterwards, he came to assist with the conquest of Jaffa at Baldwin's request with the True Cross to encourage the troops, and one hundred and fifty men he had recruited.

In the same year Dagobert went to Rome to appeal against his deposition, and Pope Paschal II reinstated him. When Evremar heard about this, he went to Rome, but he arrived to find his rival had died. Paschal was then inclined to re-appoint Evremar, but king Baldwin had become dissatisfied with him, considering him inefficient. Baldwin sent Arnulf of Chocques, who had himself been displaced as patriarch in favour of Dagobert in 1099, to oppose Evremar. Paschal sent Ghibbelin of Arles, Archbishop of Arles, to Jerusalem as legate to decide the matter. Ghibbelin found that Evremar was unfitted for the position and declared it vacant, and Baldwin then proposed Ghibbelin himself as patriarch. He accepted and Evremar was compensated with the Archbishopric of Caesarea.

In 1119 he again blessed troops before battle with the True Cross. He was a signatory to the canons agreed by the Council of Nablus in 1120, and in 1123 he was a signatory to the Pactum Warmundi, a treaty of alliance between the Kingdom of Jerusalem and the Republic of Venice. His date of death is not known.

Adrian Fortescue, writing in the Catholic Encyclopedia describes Evremar as an "anti-patriarch" as his appointment was not ratified by the pope.

Preceded by Dagobert of Pisa	Latin Patriarch of Jerusalem; 1102-1105	Succeeded by Dagobert of Pisa
