= Robert of Rouen (bishop of Lydda and Ramla) =

Robert of Rouen (died before 1112) was the first bishop of Lydda and Ramla from 1099.

== Bishop ==
Born in the Roman Catholic Archdiocese of Rouen, Robert was a Norman cleric who joined the First Crusade. The crusaders took possession of Ramla without fight on 30 June 1099, because the Muslim garrison had left it. The nearby Church of Saint George was an important shrine at Lydda and the crusaders decided to establish a Roman Catholic bishopric in the town. The crusader leaders appointed Robert as the first bishop of the new diocese. They also granted Ramla, Lydda and the nearby villages to the bishopric.

Being the only Roman Catholic bishop in Palestine, Robert consecrated Daimbert of Pisa as the Latin Patriarch of Jerusalem on Christmas Day in 1099.

Robert died before 1112 when his successor, Roger is first mentioned in a charter.

== Sources ==
- Asbridge, Thomas (2004). The First Crusade: A New History. Simon&Schuster. ISBN 978-0-7432-2084-2.
- Barber, Malcolm (2012). The Crusader States. Yale University Press. ISBN 978-0-300-11312-9.
- Mayer, Hans Eberhard (1985). "The Origins of the Lordships of Ramla and Lydda in the Kingdom of Jerusalem". Speculum. 60 (3): 537–552. doi:10.2307/2848174. ISSN 0038-7134. JSTOR 2848174. S2CID 162263129.
- Murray, Alan V. (2000). The Crusader Kingdom of Jerusalem: A Dynastic History, 1099–1125. Prosopographica et Geneologica. ISBN 978-1-9009-3403-9.
