= Council of Troyes (1129) =

Council convened by Bernard of Clairvaux

The Council of Troyes was convened by Bernard of Clairvaux on 13 January 1129 in the city of Troyes. The council, largely attended by French clerics, was assembled to hear a petition by Hugues de Payens, head of the Knights Templar. Pope Honorius II did not attend the council, sending the papal legate, Matthew, cardinal-bishop of Albano. The council addressed issues concerning the Templar Order and a dispute between the bishop of Paris and king of France.

== Background ==
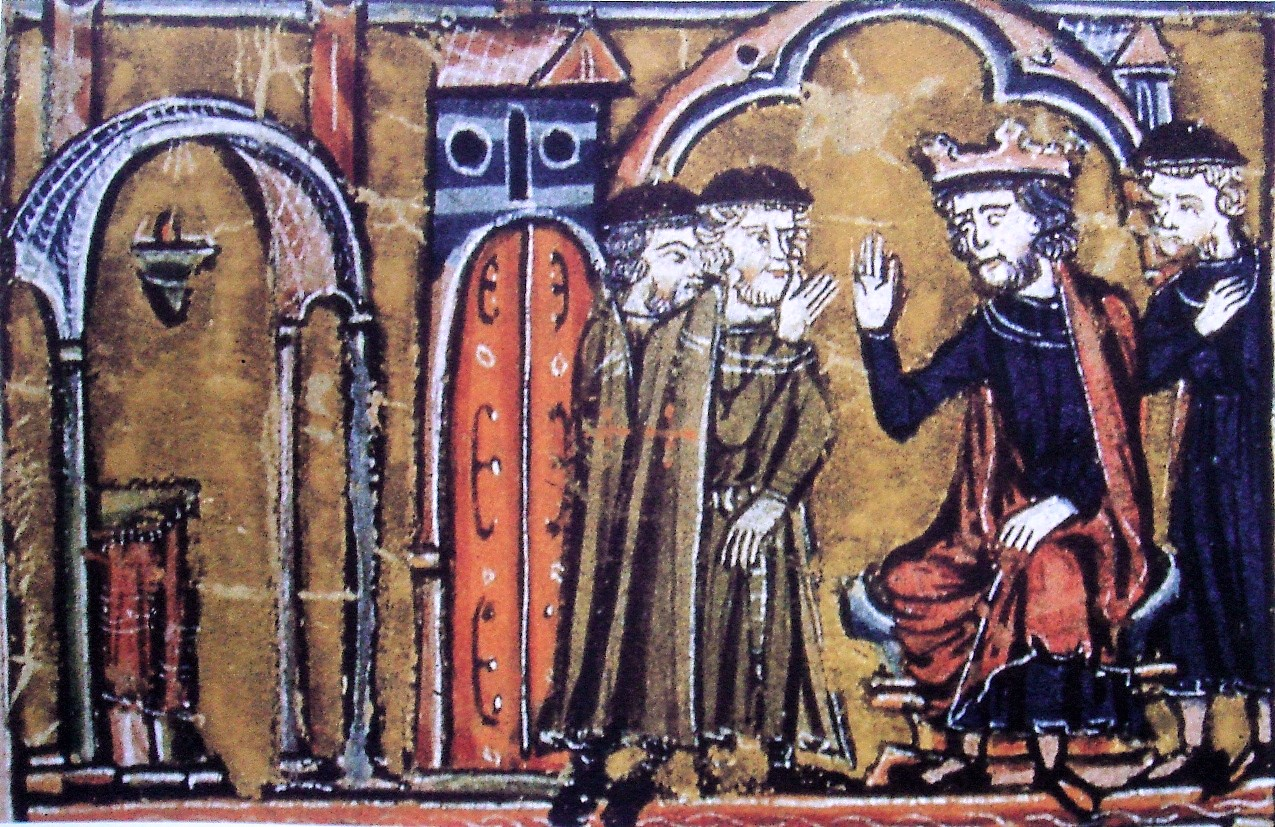
King Baldwin II of Jerusalem ceding the Temple to Hugues de Payens and Godfrey de saint-Omer

Founded by Hugues de Payens in 1119, the Knights Templar had gained the backing of King Baldwin II of Jerusalem at the Council of Nablus in 16 January 1120. In 1126, Baldwin had commissioned two clerics to speak with Bernard of Clairvaux seeking papal recognition and a Rule for the Templar Order. Later, Baldwin sent Hugues to Europe to convince Fulk of Anjou to marry his daughter Melisende and to raise an army for a crusade against Damascus. Hugues's other objectives were to gain papal recognition, recruit members for the Order, and establish a permanent Templar base in Europe. According to William of Tyre, at the time of the council of Troyes the Order had only 9 members.

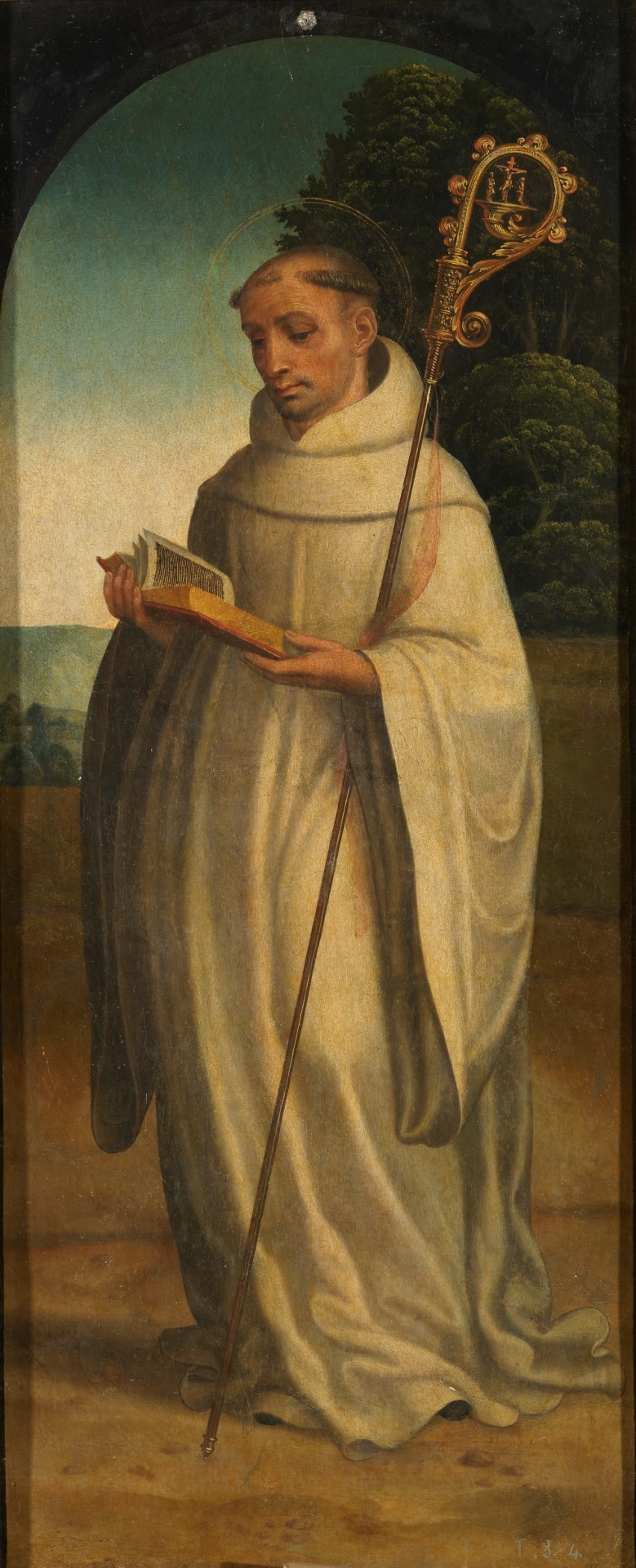
Bernard of Clairvaux convened the Council of Troyes.

== Council ==
Bernard convened the council on 13 January 1129. (Note: Upton-Ward states the date of the council had been accepted as January 1128; however, R. Hiestand argues the date of the council as January 1129.) The attendees, which were mainly French clerics, consisted of the archbishops Renaud of Reims and Henry of Sens, ten bishops, four Cistercian abbots, a number of other abbots, and the clerical scholars, Alberic of Reims and Fulger. Pope Honorius was not in attendance at the council, instead sending his papal legate, Matthew, cardinal-bishop of Albano. (Note: Piers Paul Read states the papal legate Matthew, cardinal-bishop of Albano, presided over the council.)

=== Templar Order ===
The head of the Order, Hugues de Payen, petitioned the council for a Rule for the Templars. The council passed, with considerable influence from Bernard, the Templar rule, similar to that of Rule of Saint Benedict. The Templar Rule consolidated the monastic tenets of poverty, chastity, obedience and added a vow to defend the Holy Land. The Rule was originally written in Latin, but was translated into French sometime after the Council of Pisa in 1135. Due to a petition by Pope Honorius II and Patriarch Stephen of Jerusalem, the Templars were required wear a white habit. (Note: According to the papal bull Omne datum optimum (1139), the Templar habit also had a red cross on the left shoulder.)

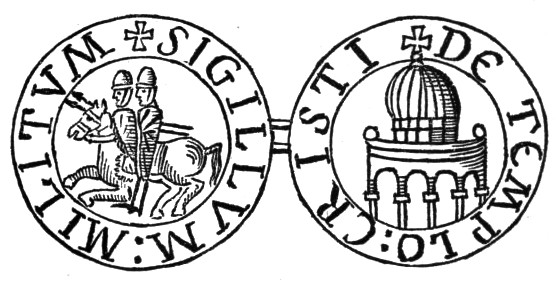
Seal of the Knights Templar

=== Disputes ===
The Council addressed disputes concerning Bishop Stephen of Paris and King Louis VI of France.

== Aftermath ==
Following the Council of Troyes' decision concerning the Templar Order, the Templars gained popularity throughout France, Portugal, Spain and Provence. The influx of gold, silver, grants of properties, and men, allowed Hugues de Payens to appoint Payen de Montdidier to oversee France. Even nobility were joining the Order, with Ramon Berenguer III, Count of Barcelona, being accepted as a companion member on 14 July 1130.

== Sources ==
- Barber, Malcolm (1994). The New Knighthood. Cambridge University Press.
- Barber, Malcolm; Bate, Keith, eds. (2002). The Templars: Selected Sources. Manchester University Press.
- Ben-Ami, Aharon (1969). Social Change in a Hostile Environment: The Crusaders' Kingdom of Jerusalem. Princeton University Press.
- Demurger, Alain (2020). "The beard and the habit in the Templars' trial: membership, rupture, resistance". In Nicholson, Helen J.; Burgtorf, Jochen (eds.). The Templars, the Hospitallers and the Crusades: Essays in Homage to Alan J. Forey. Routledge.
- Howe, John (2016). "The Rule: Military Secret of the Knights Templar". Medieval Warfare. 6, No. 5 (Nov/Dec): 20-26.
- Ott, John S. (2015). Bishops, Authority and Community in Northwestern Europe, c.1050–1150. Cambridge University Press.
- Phillips, Jonathan (2010). The Second Crusade: Extending The Frontiers Of Christendom. Yale University Press.
- Read, Piers Paul (1999). The Templars. Da Capo Press.
- Riley-Smith, Jonathan (1998). The First Crusaders, 1095-1131. Cambridge University Press.
- Selwood, Dominic (2001). Knights of the Cloister: Templars and Hospitallers in Central-southern Occitania, C.1100-c.1300. The Boydell Press.
- Upton-Ward, J.M., ed. (1992). The Rule of the Templars: The French Text of the Rule of the Order of the Knights Templar. The Boydell Press.
