= William of Malines =

12th century Latin Patriarch of Jerusalem

- Latin Patriarch of Jerusalem
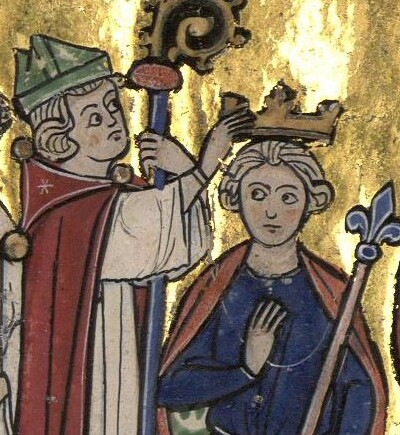
- William crowns King Fulk
- Archdiocese: Latin Patriarchate of Jerusalem
- Appointed: Pope Innocent II
- In office: 1130–1145/6
- Predecessor: Stephen of La Ferté
- Successor: Fulk of Angoulême
- Other post: Prior of the Church of the Holy Sepulchre (1127-1130)

Orders
- Ordination: Augustinian Canons

Personal details
- Died: 1145/6

William of Malines (or William of Messines) (died 1145/6) was a Flemish priest who was the prior of the Church of the Holy Sepulchre from 1127 to 1130 and was then Latin patriarch of Jerusalem from 1130 until his death. He is sometimes called William I to distinguish him from William of Agen, second patriarch of that name, but he was the second William to serve as prior of the Holy Sepulchre after William the Englishman.

William of Tyre described William of Mesines as a man of "praiseworthy habits". As patriarch, he was an important supporter of Queen Melisende and is described as a man capable yet pliable. He received a letter from Bernard of Clairvaux urging him to support the Knights Templar, who had received their papal privileges at the same time as William's embassy to Rome. William took the initiative in constructing a castle, the "Castrum Arnaldi" (or Chastel Arnoul) at Yalo, to guard the road between Jerusalem and Jaffa in 1132–33, along with some citizens. It was later a Templar stronghold. William was on good terms with his successor Peter and in 1134 he gave the canons of the Holy Sepulchre the charge of the shrine of the Mount of Temptation who agreed to found a daughter house there. He also sanctioned the formation of a confraternity between the four communities of Augustinian canons in Jerusalem (those of the Holy Sepulchre, the Templum Domini, the Mount of Olives and Mt Zion) at some point between 1130 and 1136.

In 1139 Patriarch William was displeased by the actions of the archbishop of Tyre, Fulcher of Angoulême, who travelled to Rome to receive his pallium from Pope Honorius II and protest the division of his archdiocese into two ecclesiastical territories: the northern suffragans were under the authority of the Latin patriarch of Antioch and only the southern sees remained under Fulcher's control. Perhaps fearing that Fulcher would try to remove his entire archdiocese to the Principality of Antioch (so that he might exercise control over it all as archbishop), William took direct control over the southern sees of Tyre in Fulcher's absence, for William would not allow the archbishop of Tyre, whose archdiocese lay within the boundaries of the Kingdom of Jerusalem and his patriarchate, to become the subject of another.

In April 1141 the papal legate Alberic of Ostia arrived together with the Armenian Catholicos Gregory III and convened a legatine council in the Templum Domini. Here the question over the jurisdiction was settled and the claim of Antioch's patriarch Ralph of Domfront to the diocese of Tyre rejected.

== Sources ==
- Hamilton, Bernard; Jotischky, Andrew (22 October 2020). Latin and Greek Monasticism in the Crusader States. Cambridge University Press. ISBN 978-0-521-83638-8.
- Lapina, Elizabeth; Morton, Nicholas (22 May 2017). The Uses of the Bible in Crusader Sources. Brill. ISBN 978-90-04-34121-0.
- Phillips, Jonathan P. (15 May 2017). "Armenia, Edessa and the Second Crusade". In Housley, Norman (ed.). Knighthoods of Christ: Essays on the History of the Crusades and the Knights Templar, Presented to Malcolm Barber. Routledge. ISBN 978-1-351-92392-7.

Catholic Church titles
Preceded by William the Englishman	Prior of the Holy Sepulchre; 1127–1130	Succeeded by Peter of Barcelona
Preceded by Stephen of La Ferté	Latin Patriarch of Jerusalem; 1130–1145	Succeeded by Fulcher of Angoulême
