= Tyrannion of Amisus =

Ancient Greek grammarian

Tyrannion (Ancient Greek: Τυραννίων, Tyranníōn; Latin: Tyrannio; fl. 1st century BC) was a Greek grammarian brought to Rome as a war captive and slave. He is also known as Tyrannion the Elder, in order to distinguish him from his pupil who is known as Tyrannion the Younger.

Tyrannion was a native of Amisus in Pontus, the son of Epicratides, or according to some accounts, of Corymbus. His mother was Lindia. He was a pupil of Hestiaeus of Amisus, and was originally called Theophrastus, but received from his instructor the name of Tyrannion ("little tyrant") on account of his domineering behaviour to his fellow disciples. He afterwards studied under Dionysius the Thracian at Rhodes.

In 72 BC he was taken captive by Lucullus, who carried him to Rome. At the request of Lucius Licinius Murena, Tyrannion was handed over to him, upon which he emancipated him, an act with which Plutarch finds fault, as the emancipation involved a recognition of his having been a slave, which does not seem to have been the light in which Lucullus regarded him.

At Rome, Tyrannion occupied himself in teaching. He was also employed in arranging the library of Apellicon, which Sulla brought to Rome. Cicero employed him in a similar manner, and speaks in the highest terms of the learning and ability which Tyrannion exhibited in these labours. Cicero also availed himself of his services in the instruction of his nephew Quintus. Strabo speaks of having received instruction from Tyrannion.

The geographical knowledge of Tyrannion seems to have been considerable; at any rate Cicero thought highly of it. Tyrannion amassed considerable wealth, and, according to the scarcely credible statement of the Suda, collected himself a library of 30,000 volumes. Cicero alludes to a small work of his, but we do not learn the subject of it. Tyrannion died at a very advanced age of a paralytic stroke.
