= Robert of Normandy =

Robert of Normandy may refer to:

- Rollo, baptized as Robert, (c. 860 - c. 932), viking founder and first ruler of Normandy
- Robert the Magnificent (1000 – 1035), also called the Devil or Robert I, Duke of Normandy, son of Richard II, Duke of Normandy
- Robert Curthose or Robert II (c. 1051 or 1054–1134), Duke of Normandy, son of William the Conqueror, the first Norman king of England
