= Latin Rule =

Document outlining the behavior of a knight

The Latin Rule was a document with 72 clauses attributed to Bernard de Clairvaux and Hugues de Payens. It is also known as the "Specific Behavior for the Templar Order". It outlines the ideal behavior of a knight.

The rule borrowed from the Rule of Saint Augustine, but was mostly inspired by the Rule of Saint Benedict (Latin: Regula Sancti Benedicti). It was, however, adapted for use by active, primarily military, knights, rather than cloistered monks. For example, the fasts were less severe so that they did not interfere with combat.

The original rule was written in 1128 and added to the minutes of the Council of Troyes in 1129. However, in about 1138 under the direction of Robert de Craon, second grand master of the order (1136–1149), the rule was translated into French and modified. Later, it was expanded to include 609 articles, notably covering such things as hierarchy and justice within the order.

== See also ==
- Knights Templar
- Rule of Saint Augustine
- Rule of Saint Benedict
- Rule of the Master
- Rule of Saint Basil
- Columban Rule
- Rule of St. Albert
