= Tyrannion of Tyre =

Saint Tyrannion (or Tyrannio) was the bishop of Tyre who was martyred during the Diocletianic persecution in 311. His feast day in the Roman Martyrology is February 20.

According to Eusebius of Caesarea, he was thrown into the sea and drowned at Antioch, which lies on the Orontes River, not the coast. Rufinus of Aquileia also mentions him, but does not mention how he met his death. He was killed along with one of his priests, Zenobius. In the past the Roman Martyrology conflated the deaths of Tyrannion and Zenobius, which took place at Antioch in 311, with the execution of five young Christians at Tyre in 303. The martyrs of Tyre also share the feast day of February 20.
