= Hugues de Payens =

Co-Founder and Grand Master of the Knights Templar

Hugo de Paganis
- French: Hugues de Payens
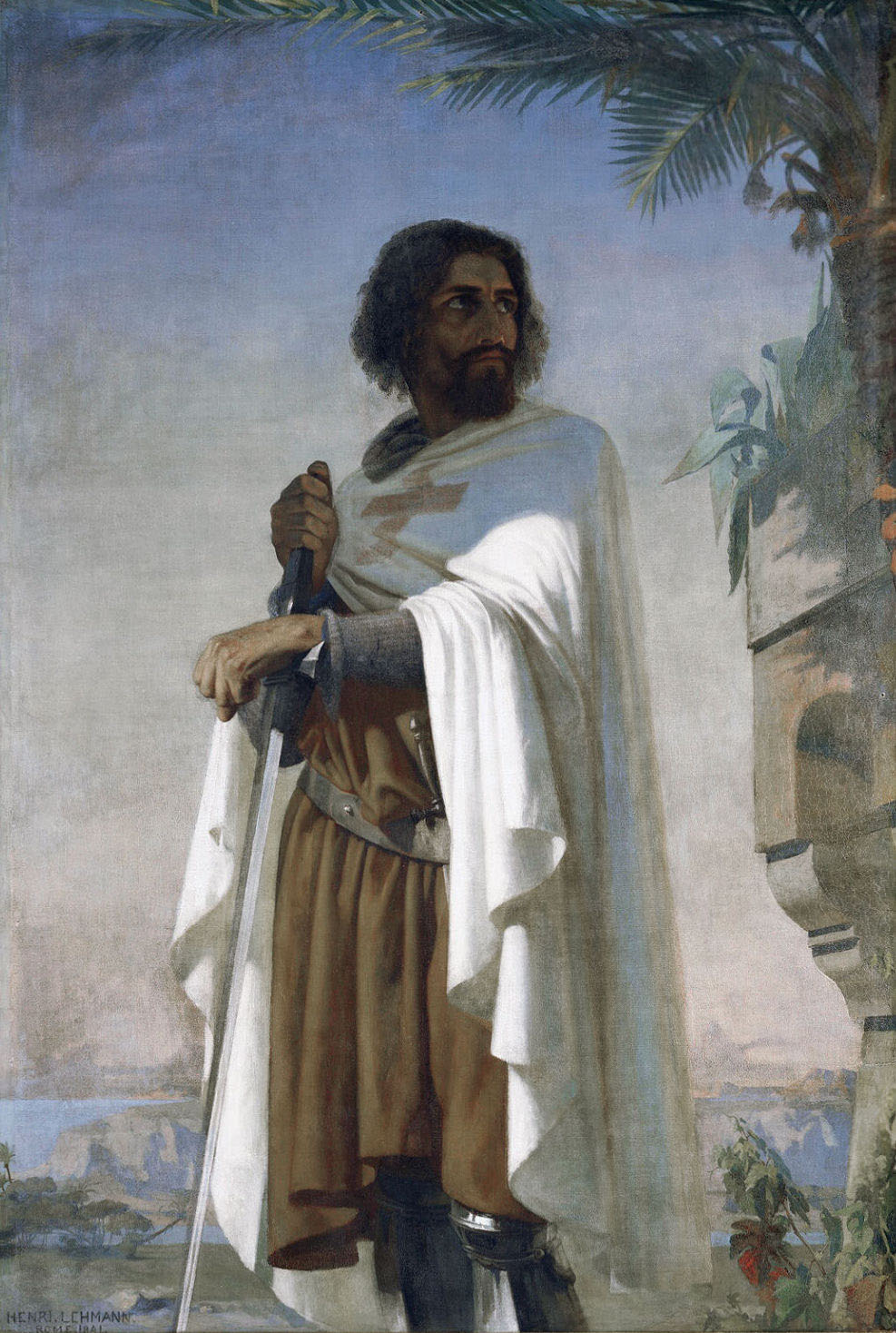

1st Grand Master of the Knights Templar
- In office c. 1119–1136
- Preceded by: Order established
- Succeeded by: Robert de Craon

Personal details
- Born: c. 1070 Payns, County of Champagne
- Died: 24 May 1136 Kingdom of Jerusalem
- Known for: Founding member and first Grand Master of the Knights Templar

Hugo de Paganis, commonly known in French as Hugues de Payens or Payns (French: [yɡ də pɛ̃]; c. 1070 – 24 May 1136), was the co-founder and first Grand Master of the Knights Templar.

== Origin and early life ==
The Latin text of William of Tyre's History of Deeds Done Beyond the Sea, dated c. 1185, calls him Hugo de Paganis, without any geographical reference. William's history was translated into French in the early 13th century, by an anonymous author who added that Hugh was from "delez Troies," “near Troyes." The 12th-century author Walter Map also noted that Hugh was named "Payns, from a village of that name in Burgundy.” Hugh is therefore assumed to have come from the village of Payns, about 10 km from Troyes, in Champagne (eastern France).

Hugo de Pedano, Montiniaci dominus is mentioned as a witness to a donation by Count Hugh of Champagne in a document of 1085–90, indicating that the man was at least sixteen by this date—a legal adult and thus able to bear witness to legal documents—and so born no later than 1070. The same name appears on a number of other charters up to 1113 also relating to Count Hugh of Champagne, suggesting that Hugo de Pedano or Hugo dominus de Peanz was a member of the Count's court. By the year 1113, he was married to Elisabeth de Chappes, who bore him at least one child, Thibaud, later abbot of the Abbaye de la Colombe at Sens. The documents span Hugh's lifetime and the disposition of his property after his death.

Bernard of Clairvaux, who favoured the Order and helped to compose its Latin Rule, also had the support of Hugh of Champagne. The Latin Rule of the Order was confirmed at the Council of Troyes. A Templar commandery was eventually built at Payns. This is considered to be additional circumstantial evidence that Hugh was from the area.

Other suggestions that Hugh came from Viviers in the modern département of Ardèche) or from Nocera dei Pagani in Campania can “reasonably be dismissed.”

== The foundation of the Order ==
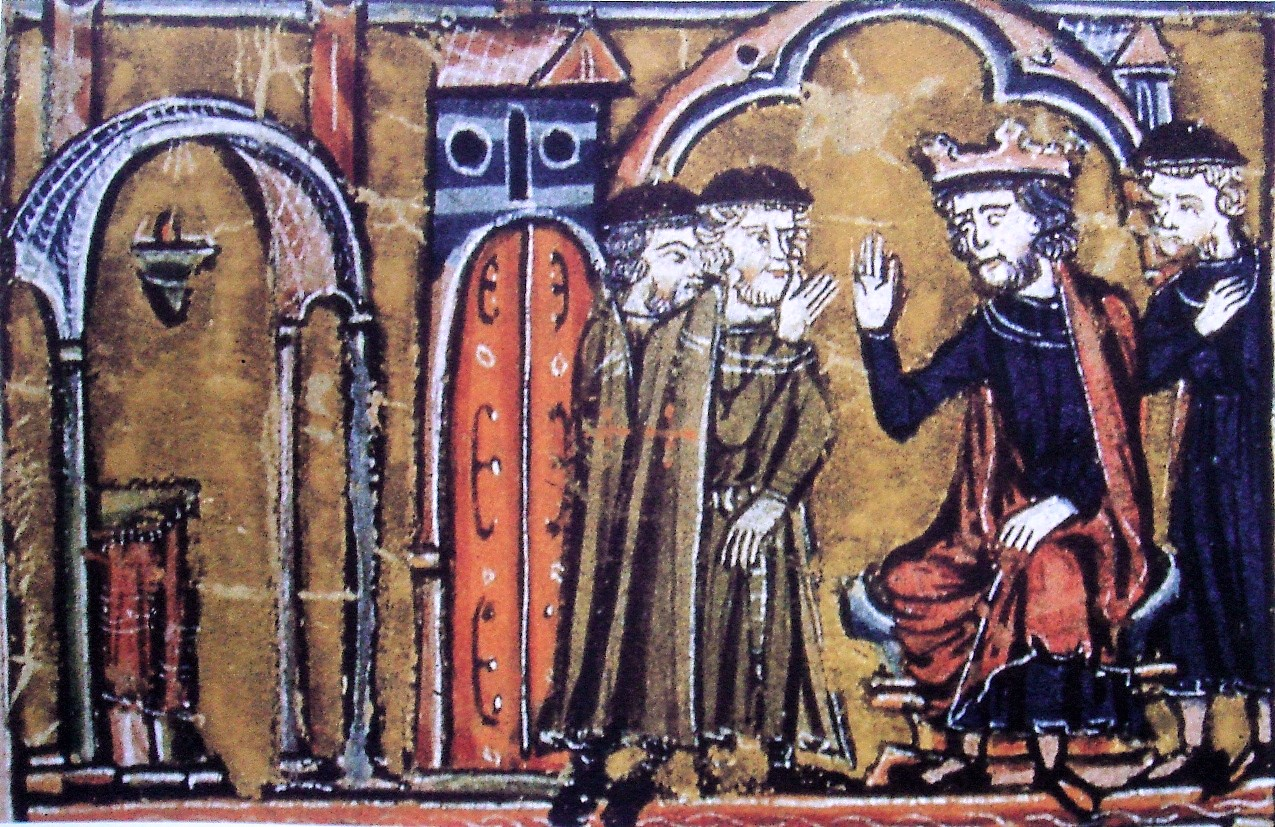
King Baldwin II of Jerusalem ceding the Temple to Hugh of Payens and Godfrey de Saint-Omer

Hugh, Count of Champagne made a pilgrimage to the Holy Land in 1104–07 and visited Jerusalem for a second time in 1114–16. He was probably accompanied by Hugh of Payens, who remained there after the Count returned to France, as "Hugo de Peans" witnessed a charter in Jerusalem in 1120-1121. He was called magister militum Templi ("Master of the Knights of the Temple") for the first time in a document dated 1125. He most likely obtained approval for the Order from King Baldwin II of Jerusalem and Warmund of Picquigny, the Latin Patriarch of Jerusalem, at the Council of Nablus in 1120.

In the late 1120s, Hugo de Paganis and five other Templars (Godfrey de Saint-Omer, Roland, Geoffrey Bisol, Payen de Montdidier, and Archambaud de Saint-Amand-les-Eaux) went on a diplomatic mission to western Europe on behalf of Baldwin II. They met with nobles and kings at the Council of Troyes in an attempt to encourage warriors to come to the Kingdom of Jerusalem and join an attack on Damascus that Baldwin was planning.

== Death ==
Hugo died in 1136. The Templars commemorated his death every year on 24 May. He was succeeded as Grand Master by Robert de Craon.

== Sources ==
- William of Tyre, History of Deeds Done Beyond the Sea, trans. E. A. Babcock and A. C. Krey (Columbia University Press, 1943, repr. Octagon Books, 1976.
- Walter Map, De nugis curialium, ed. and tr. by M.R. James, rev. by C.N.L. Brooke and R.A.B. Mynors (Oxford, 1983).
- J. M. Upton-Ward, The Rule of the Templars: The French Text of the Rule of the Order of Knights Templar (Boydell Press, 1992)
- Malcolm Barber, "The origins of the Order of the Temple," in Studia Monastica 12 (1970).
- Malcolm Barber and Keith Bate, The Templars: Selected Sources (Manchester University Press, 2007).
- Thierry Leroy, Hugues de Payns, chevalier champenois, fondateur de l'Ordre des Templiers (Maison Boulanger, 1997).
- Anthony Luttrell, "The earliest Templars," in Autour de la premiere croisade, ed. Michel Balard (Sorbonne, 1996).
- Dominic K. Selwood, "Quidam autem dubitaverunt. The Saint, the Sinner, the Temple and a Possible Chronology," in Autour de la premiere croisade, ed. Michel Balard (Sorbonne, 1996).

=== Further reading ===
- Simonetta Cerrini, La rivoluzione dei Templari (Mondadori, 2007)
- Simonetta Cerrini, "Le fondateur de l’ordre du Temple à ses frères: Hugues de Payns et le Sermo Christi militibus," in Dei Gesta per Francos: Crusade Studies in Honour of Jean Richard, ed. Michel Balard, Benjamin Z. Kedar, Jonathan Riley-Smith (Ashgate, 2001)
- Peter W. Edbury, "The Old French William of Tyre and the Origins of the Templars," in Knighthoods of Christ: Essays on the History of the Crusades and the Knights Templar (Ashgate, 2007)
- Helen Nicholson, A Brief History of the Knights Templar (Robinson, 2010)
- Albin Wallace, The Grand Masters of the Knights Templar in the Kingdom of Jerusalem (Oxford, 2025)

Religious titles
New title	Grand Master of the Knights Templar c. 1119–1136	Succeeded by Robert de Craon
