= Tyrannion the Younger =

Ancient Greek sophist

Tyrannion (Ancient Greek: Τυραννίων), son of Artemidorus (Ἀρτεμίδωρος), was a Greek sophist from Phoenicia around the 1st century BCE. He was a pupil of Tyrannion of Amisus. He is also known as Tyrannion the Younger and his teacher (Tyrannion of Amisus) as Tyrannion the Elder. His original name was Diocles (Διοκλῆς), and changed it to Tyrannion to honor his teacher.

He became a slave during the war between Antony and Caesar and was purchased by a freedman of Caesar who was named Dymas. Later, he was given as a gift to Terentia, the wife of Cicero, who at some point freed him.

He taught at Rome as an eminent grammarian and established a school.

He wrote many books which are now lost (although some may have confused with some of his teacher), including the:

- On Homeric Prosody (Περὶ τῆς Ὁμηρικῆς προσῳδίας)
- On the Parts of Speech (Περὶ τῶν μερῶν τοῦ λόγου)
- On the Roman Dialect (Περὶ τῆς Ῥωμαἴκῆς διαλέκτου)
- The Disagreement of Modern Poets with Homer (Ὅτι διαφωνοῦσιν οἱ νεώτεροι ποιηταὶ πρὸς Ὅμηρον)
- Exegesis of Tyrannio's Division of the Parts of Speech (Ἐξήγησις τοῦ Τυραννίωνος μερισμον̂)
- Textual Criticism of Homer (Διόρθωσις Ὁμηρική)
- Orthography (Ὀρθογραφία)

Walter Haas believed that the younger Tyrannion was spoken only as Diocles and in the Die Fragmente des Grammatikers Dionysios Thrax, Die Fragmente der Grammatiker Tyrannion und Diokles, attributes the 'Tyrannion' fragments to the Elder, while the 'Diocles' fragments to the Younger.

It is difficult for the modern historians to distinguish references of Tyrannion the Elder from Tyrannion the Younger/Diocles. In addition, there is a possibility that there was also a different separate Diocles which is difficult to be distinguished from Tyrannion the Younger/Diocles.
