= Ralph the Englishman =

English administrator and bishop of Bethlehem

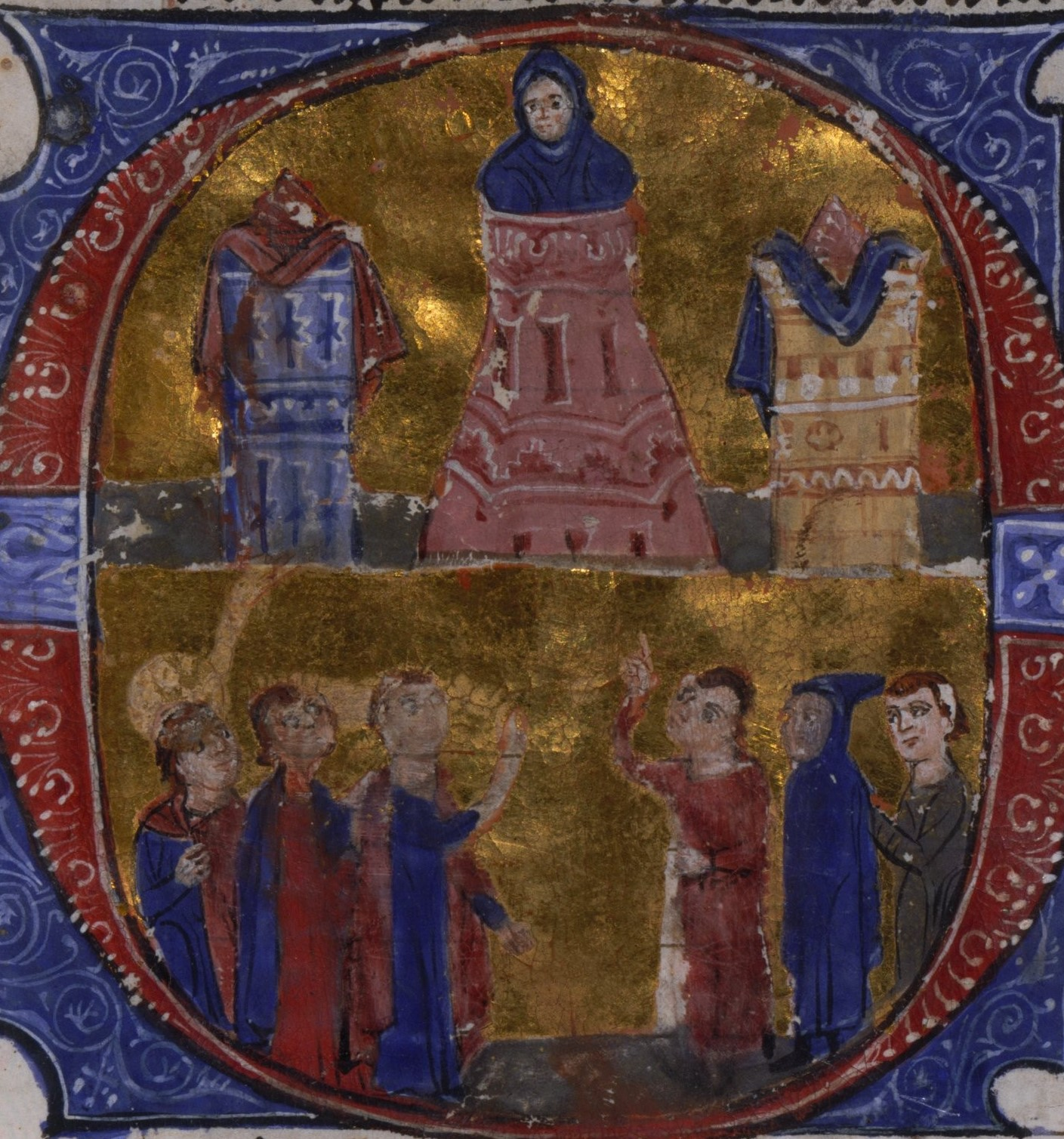
Ralph scolds Prince Reynald of Antioch for mistreating Patriarch Aimery of Antioch

Ralph the Englishman (died 1174) was a Catholic prelate who was the bishop of Bethlehem and chancellor of the Kingdom of Jerusalem.

== Biography ==
Ralph is expressly stated by William of Tyre to have been an Englishman. But nothing is known of him before 20 February 1146, when he first appears in a charter as chancellor of the Latin kingdom of Jerusalem under Baldwin III (Röhricht, Regesta, pp. 61, 62). Ralph was in high favour with the young king, his mother Melisend, and the court party. On 25 January 1147 the see of Tyre became vacant by the election of Archbishop Fulcher to the patriarchate of Jerusalem, and through the king's influence Ralph obtained the archbishopric, which he held at least till 22 June 1150. Some of the bishops, however, appealed against the election to the pope, and, though Ralph held possession for two years, Eugenius eventually decided against him (William of Tyre, xvi. 17). In 1153 or 1154, when Reginald of Chatillon had imprisoned the patriarch of Antioch, Ralph was dispatched by King Baldwin to expostulate with him. Early in 1156 Ralph was elected Bishop of Bethlehem, according to William of Tyre, through the favour of his fellow-countryman, Adrian IV; his election took place before 7 June 1156, and his consecration between that date and 2 November of the same year (ib., 82–3). As was usual in the kingdom of Jerusalem, Ralph retained the chancellorship after his promotion to a bishopric, and his name occurs frequently in official documents down to his death. In 1158 he joined with other bishops in protesting against the election of Amalric as patriarch of Jerusalem. In 1167 he accompanied King Amalric in his Egyptian campaign, and was severely wounded and lost all his baggage in the battle in the desert. About the end of 1168 Guy, count of Nevers, bestowed on Ralph the church and revenues of Clamecy, near Nevers in France, and Ralph accompanied the count on his return thither between October 1168 and January 1170. In February or March of the latter year Ralph was at Pontoise, endeavouring to reconcile Henry II and Thomas Becket (Fitzstephen, Life of Becket, Rolls Ser. iii. 97–8). Ralph took advantage of his visit to help Amalric's ambassador, Frederick of Tyre, in seeking aid for the kingdom of Jerusalem from Henry II and Louis. He also took part in the movement which forced the grandmaster of the temple to resign in 1169. Before the end of 1170 Ralph returned to the Holy Land, and was present with Amalric at the relief of Darum; in 1171, when the king was absent in the north, he accompanied Henfrid the constable to the relief of Kerak, and bore the holy cross. He died in the spring of 1174, the same year as King Amalric, and was buried in the chapter-house at Bethlehem. The last document in which his name occurs is dated 18 April 1174 (ib., p. 136). An inscription at Bethlehem records that the mosaics in the Church of the Nativity were executed during his episcopate in 1169. William of Tyre, when relating Ralph's intrusion to the archbishopric of Tyre, speaks of him as a handsome and learned but over-worldly man; when recording his death, William calls him ‘venerabilis dominus Radulphus felicis memoriæ … vir liberalis et benignus admodum.’
