= Warmund of Picquigny =

Latin Patriarch of Jerusalem from 1118 until 1128

Warmund, also Garmond, Gormond, Germond, Guarmond or Waremond (bef. 1069–1128), was the Latin Patriarch of Jerusalem from 1118 until his death at Sidon in 1128.

Warmund of Picquigny was a son of another Warmund (Guermond) of Picquigny and his wife Adele. His brother Eustache was Vidame of Amiens. Shortly after the death of Arnulf of Chocques, Warmund was elected to replace him as Patriarch of Jerusalem in late 1118. In 1120, with Baldwin II, King of Jerusalem, he convened the Council of Nablus. The canons of the council served as a sort of concordat between the church of Outremer and the Crusader states. The first canon is a promise by Baldwin to surrender the appropriate tithes to the patriarch, namely those from his own royal estates in Jerusalem, Nablus and Acre. In the second canon, Baldwin requests forgiveness for the tithes he had previously withheld, and Warmund absolves him in the third. At about this same time Warmund was approached by a group of Christian knights who requested permission to elect a master to lead them to defend the kingdom. King Baldwin II gave them quarters in the Temple of Solomon. Hugues de Payens was elected their master and Warmund charged them with the duty of keeping the roads safe from thieves and others who were routinely robbing and killing pilgrims en route to Jerusalem. This they did for nine years until the Council of Troyes in 1129 when they became a military order sanctioned by the Church; the Knights Templar.

Between c. 1119–c. 1125 and along with Gerard, Prior of the Holy Sepulchre, possibly attached to the Canons of the Holy Sepulchre, Warmund wrote an important letter to Diego Gelmírez, Archbishop of Santiago de Compostela citing crop failures and being threatened by their enemies; they requested food, money, and military aid in order to maintain the kingdom of Jerusalem. In 1123, he negotiated an alliance between Jerusalem and the Republic of Venice. This was finalized in the treaty which bears his name: the Pactum Warmundi (from his Latin name Warmundus). In 1124, he was appointed supreme commander of the Crusader forces besieging Tyre, as he was felt to possess greater authority than any alternative as commander. He was a faithful friend of King Baldwin.

In 1128, he laid a siege on Belhacem, which was occupied by brigands. However, he fell seriously ill and was taken to Sidon, where he died in July 1128.

Catholic Church titles
Preceded by Arnulf of Chocques	Latin Patriarch of Jerusalem; 1119–1128	Succeeded by Stephen of La Ferté
