= Dagobert of Pisa =

Roman Catholic archbishop (died 1105)

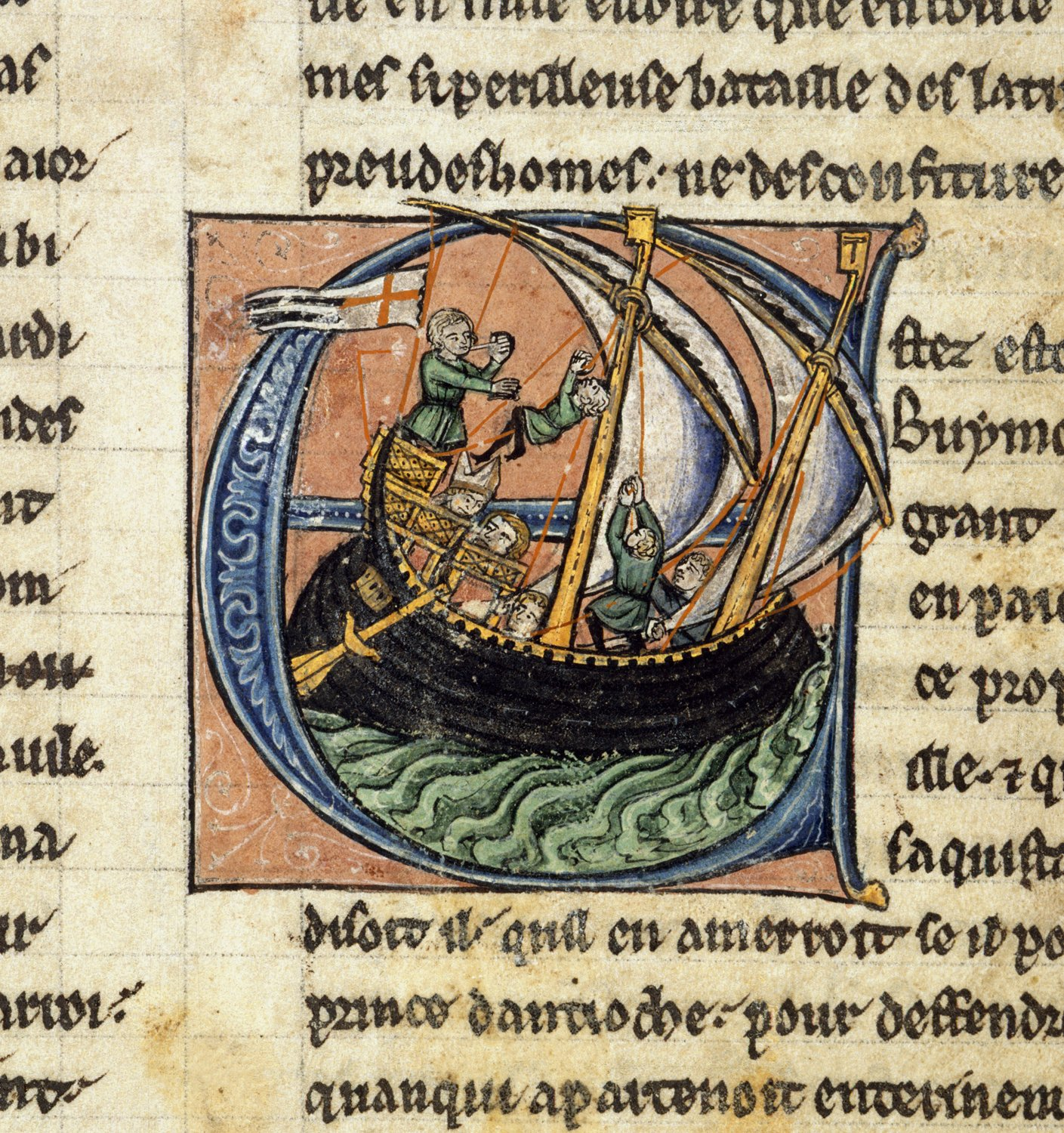
Bohemund and Dagobert, sailing for Apulia, in a ship flying the cross of St George

Dagobert (or Daibert or Daimbert) (died 1105) was the first archbishop of Pisa and the second Latin patriarch of Jerusalem after the city was captured in the First Crusade.

== Early life ==
Little is known of Dagobert's early life, but he is thought to have originally been ordained by Wezilo, Archbishop of Mainz 1084-88, a leading supporter of the emperor in the Investiture Controversy and of the Antipope Clement III. In 1085, Wezilo was excommunicated for simony by the pro-papal synod of Quedlinburg. Dagobert's own name places his origin in Lombardy/Emilia, site of some staunchly imperial cities.

== (Arch)bishop of Pisa ==
By the late 1080s Dagobert had changed sides, becoming close to Countess Matilda of Tuscany, one of the papacy's staunchest supporters. Pope Urban II cancelled Dagobert's irregular ordination and replaced it with a canonical one, and in 1088 made him Bishop of Pisa. Initially, the appointment of a man with such a controversial past attracted hostility. Peter, Bishop of Pistoia, protested to the pope, and the cathedral chapter opposed it, but Urban's continued support allowed Dagobert to establish his authority. He played an active role in Pisa's civic life, for example joining with other notables in 1090 to regulate the maximum height of houses, and by 1092 the clergy were signing his documents. He seems to have become a well-respected figure in Pisa's political and economic life, adopting a practical approach to the problems he faced both in Pisa and later in his career. He remained close to Urban and Matilda, and in 1092 Urban raised the see to an archbishopric on Matilda's recommendation.

Dagobert spent Christmas of 1094 with Pope Urban, and then accompanied him on his pastoral tour of Italy and France, including the Council of Piacenza, held to reassert the pope's authority after the Investiture Controversy, and the Council of Clermont, at which the pope launched the First Crusade. Dagobert then returned to Pisa to preach the crusade, and received enthusiastic support. In 1098 Urban appointed him legate at the court of King Alfonso VI of León, and he proved competent in his organisation of the church in the lands recently conquered from the Moors, although he was rumoured to have kept for himself some treasure sent by King Alfonso to the Pope.

== Latin Patriarch of Jerusalem ==
Before the end of 1098 Dagobert set out for the east with a lawless Pisan fleet, which made successful raids on Byzantine owned islands and skirmished with the Byzantine navy, before going on to Syria. One of the Crusader leaders, Bohemond of Antioch, was besieging the Byzantine port of Latakia, and Dagobert and the Pisans agreed to help by blockading the port from the sea. However, the other Crusader leaders, who saw the necessity for cooperation with the Byzantine Emperor and eastern Christians, were horrified and persuaded Dagobert to call off the blockade. Bohemund was forced to abandon the siege, and accompanied Dagobert to Jerusalem, arriving on 21 December 1099.

Dagobert's status when he went east is unclear. Many historians believe that Urban had appointed him apostolic legate to the crusade in succession to Adhemar of Le Puy, who died on 1 August 1098. However, Urban himself died on 29 July 1099, and in a letter to the new pope, Paschal II, in September 1099, Dagobert styles himself simply 'archbishop of Pisa'.

Immediately after Christmas, the Latin Patriarch of Jerusalem, Arnulf of Chocques, was deposed on the ground that his election had been uncanonical, and with Bohemund's support, Dagobert was elected in his place. Public opinion had always held that the Holy Land should be the patrimony of the church, but Arnulf had been too weak to establish supremacy. Dagobert's position was stronger, as he was (probably) papal legate and had the support of the Pisan fleet. Immediately after his enthronement, Godfrey of Bouillon knelt before him and was invested with the territory of Jerusalem, and Bohemund did the same for Antioch. Baldwin, the future King of Jerusalem, was at this time Lord of Edessa, but he did not pay homage for it to Dagobert, and their relations do not seem to have been good.

Dagobert was anxious to establish the patriarch's power, and he demanded that Godfrey hand over Jerusalem to him. Godfrey partly yielded, and at a ceremony on Easter Day, 1 April 1100, he announced that he would retain possession until his death, or until he conquered two great cities from the infidel, but he bequeathed Jerusalem to the Patriarch. However, Godfrey died in July, when Dagobert was accompanying a campaign against Jaffa under Bohemund's nephew, Tancred, Prince of Galilee, and the Jerusalem knights offered the lordship to Baldwin, who was Godfrey's brother. With the support of Tancred, Dagobert wrote offering the lordship of Jerusalem to Bohemund, but the letter was intercepted and Bohemund was captured by the Turks.

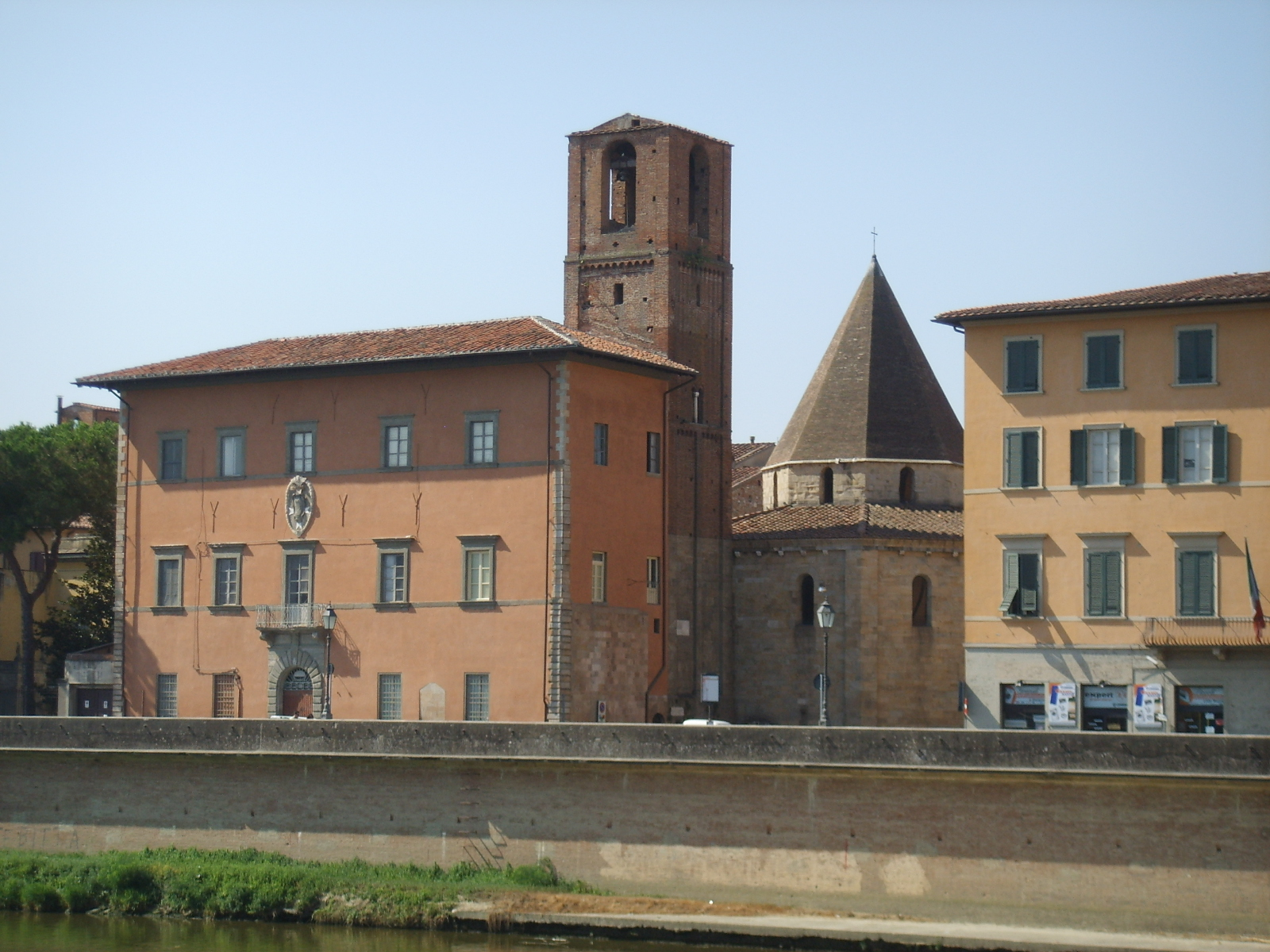
Holy Sepulchre Church, Pisa

On 11 November, Baldwin assumed the title King of Jerusalem. Dagobert was forced to accept defeat, and Baldwin, bearing in mind his influence over the Pisan fleet, confirmed him in his see. On Christmas Day 1100, Baldwin paid homage to the Patriarch and was crowned king. The arrival of a Genoese squadron in April 1101 weakened Dagobert's position, as Baldwin no longer depended for sea power on the Pisan fleet. He needed to control the church, as he was always short of money, and pious symphasisers gave their donations to the church. Complaints had been made about the legality of Dagobert's appointment, and when the pope sent a legate, Maurice, Cardinal-Bishop of Porto, to enquire into the situation, Baldwin accused Dagobert of treachery for urging Bohemond to oppose Baldwin's succession. Dagobert bribed Baldwin to drop the complaint. However, in the autumn Dagobert kept the whole of a donation partly intended for the king for his army, and for this the legate deprived him of his position.

Tancred, who now ruled Antioch, welcomed Dagobert to the city, where he put the Church of St George at his disposal. Maurice died in the spring of 1102, and when Baldwin needed Tancred's military help in the autumn, Tancred insisted on Dagobert's restoration as a condition of his assistance. Baldwin agreed, but then a new legate arrived, Cardinal Robert of Paris. Baldwin and Arnulf of Chocques, whom Dagobert had replaced as Patriarch, engineered further charges before a synod under Robert. He was charged with attacking fellow-Christians in his raids on Byzantine islands on his journey to the east, of conspiring to provoke a civil war between Bohemond and Baldwin, and keeping for himself money given for the welfare of pilgrims, and deposed as Patriarch. Tancred again welcomed him to Antioch but did not further press his claim. In Steven Runciman's view, he had shown himself a corrupt and miserly old man, and his departure was not regretted.

Dagobert later went to appeal to Pope Paschal personally. The appeal was successful, and Dagobert was on his way back to reclaim the patriarchate when he died in Messina in Sicily in 1105. Dagobert was replaced during his absence by a priest called Ehremar, and Ghibbelin of Arles succeeded on Dagobert's death. He was succeeded as Archbishop of Pisa by Pietro Moriconi, who may have been elected by the Pisans before Dagobert's death, suggesting that he might have lost support after his long – and pluralistic – absence, but charters in the cathedral archives show that his actions during his tenure were later repeatedly cited and confirmed.

== Reputation ==
Historians have generally been highly critical of Dagobert's conduct in the Holy Land. Steven Runciman in his history of the First Crusade, describes him as vigorous, but vain, ambitious, dishonest and easily influenced. In a 1998 study Michael Matzke defended Dagobert, arguing that his actions as patriarch were motivated by religious idealism, and that he was trying to carry out the intentions of Pope Urban. Historians have strongly disagreed whether this rehabilitation is convincing. Patricia Skinner, in her survey of Dagobert's career, accepts that he acted against canon law, but argues that in the exceptional circumstances of the time, he had to act pragmatically.

The name of the Holy Sepulchre church in Pisa is a reference to Dagobert's participation to the Crusade.

Religious titles
Preceded by Gerard or Gerardus (died 1085)	Bishop of Pisa; 1088-1092	Succeeded by None
Preceded by None	Archbishop of Pisa; 1092–1105	Succeeded by Pietro Moriconi
Preceded by Arnulf of Chocques	Latin Patriarch of Jerusalem; 1099–1102	Succeeded by Evremar
Preceded by Evremar	Latin Patriarch of Jerusalem; 1105	Succeeded by Ghibbelin of Arles
