= Gregory of Terracina =

Gregory of Terracina (died c.570) is a saint in the Roman Catholic and Eastern Orthodox churches. His memorial is on 12 December. A Benedictine monk at Terracina, he was a spiritual student of Benedict of Nursia and is mentioned by Gregory the Great in his Dialogues.
