= Roger (bishop of Lydda and Ramla) =

Roger was the second bishop of Lydda and Ramla from at least 1112 until 1147.

Roger's origin is unknown. He succeeded his predecessor, Robert, sometime between 1103 and 1112. Whether a reference from 1108 to a bishop with the initial R refers to Robert of Roger is unknown. The historian Bernard Hamilton considers it likely that the patriarch of Jerusalem, Ghibbelin of Arles, appointed Roger, whom he describes as "a man of real ability". Lydda was a suffragan diocese of Jerusalem.

At the urging of the new patriarch, Arnulf of Chocques, Roger granted properties, including the casale Sephoria, to the Abbey of Josaphat in 1115. In 1136, he granted four casalia within his diocese to the canons of the Holy Sepulchre, albeit holding back a portion of the tithes.

In March 1118, Roger participated in King Baldwin I of Jerusalem's last military campaign and the king died in his arms.

In 1128, Roger accompanied Archbishop William I of Tyre to Europe. In Rome, they conferred with Pope Honorius II on the state of the Holy Land. On behalf of King Baldwin II of Jerusalem, they arranged the marriage of his daughter, Melisende, to Count Fulk V of Anjou—an essential prelude to the Fulk's crusade of 1129.

== Sources ==
- Hamilton, Bernard (2016). The Latin Church in the Crusader States: The Secular Church. Routledge. ISBN 9780860780724.
- Mayer, Hans E. (1985). "The Succession to Baldwin II of Jerusalem: English Impact on the East". Dumbarton Oaks Papers. 39: 139–147. doi:10.2307/1291522. JSTOR 1291522.
- Murray, Alan V. (2000). The Crusader Kingdom of Jerusalem: A Dynastic History, 1099–1125. Prosopographica et Geneologica. ISBN 978-1-9009-3403-9.
