= John (bishop of Banyas) =

Bishop of Banias, 1161 to 1170

John was the bishop of Banias in the Kingdom of Jerusalem from 1161 until his death in 1170.

John was appointed to succeed Adam of Acre, the first Latin bishop of Banias. In 1164 the Damascene ruler Nur ad-Din Zengi besieged Banias. Neither John nor the lord of Banias, Humphrey II of Toron, were present. The defense was instead commanded by Humphrey's knight, Walter of Quesnoy. On 18 October Banias fell. King Amalric and the master of the Knights Hospitaller, Bertrand of Blancfort, alleged treason. Archbishop William of Tyre names the alleged traitors as Walter of Quesnoy and a priest named Roger, who were supposedly bribed, but William is not convinced by the allegation. John was henceforth unable to reside in his diocese, and became essentially an auxiliary bishop to the archbishop of Tyre, to whom he was also a suffragan. John continued to hold the title of bishop of Banias, and there was hope among the Latins that Banias might be recovered.

In 1169 the patriarch of Jerusalem, Amalric of Nesle, accompanied by the archbishop of Caesarea, Ernesius, and the bishop of Acre, William were sent by King Amalric on a mission to Europe with letters for Emperor Frederick Barbarossa, Kings Louis VII of France and Henry II of England, Queen Margaret of Sicily, and Counts Philip I of Flanders, Theobald V of Blois, and Henry I of Champagne. Two days after the prelates set out, however, their ships ran into a severe storm that drove them back to Acre. Because they did not dare set sail again, a new embassy was appointed, led by the archbishop of Tyre, Frederick of la Roche. John accompanied Frederick. The patriarch entrusted John with a letter explaining the sacredness and strategic significance of Banias. John was to take the letter to the king of France.

John died during the mission in Paris in 1170. No titular bishop was appointed to succeed him.

== Bibliography ==
- Barber, Malcolm (2012). The Crusader States. Yale University Press. ISBN 978-0300189315.
- Hamilton, Bernard (1980). The Latin Church in the Crusader States: The Secular Church. Variorum Publications. ISBN 978-1-351-88705-2.
- Murray, Alan V. (2022). "The Lordship and Bishopric of Banyas in the Latin Kingdom of Jerusalem (1126–1164)". In Osti, Letizia; van Berkel, Maaike (eds.). The Historian of Islam at Work: Essays in Honor of Hugh N. Kennedy. Islamic History and Civilization. Brill. ISBN 978-90-04-52524-5.
- Runciman, Steven (1952). A History of the Crusades: The Kingdom of Jerusalem and the Frankish East, 1100–1187. Vol. 2. Cambridge University Press. ISBN 0241298768.

Catholic Church titles
Preceded by Adam of Acre	Bishop of Banyas; 1161-1170	Vacant Muslim conquest
