= Council of Acre =

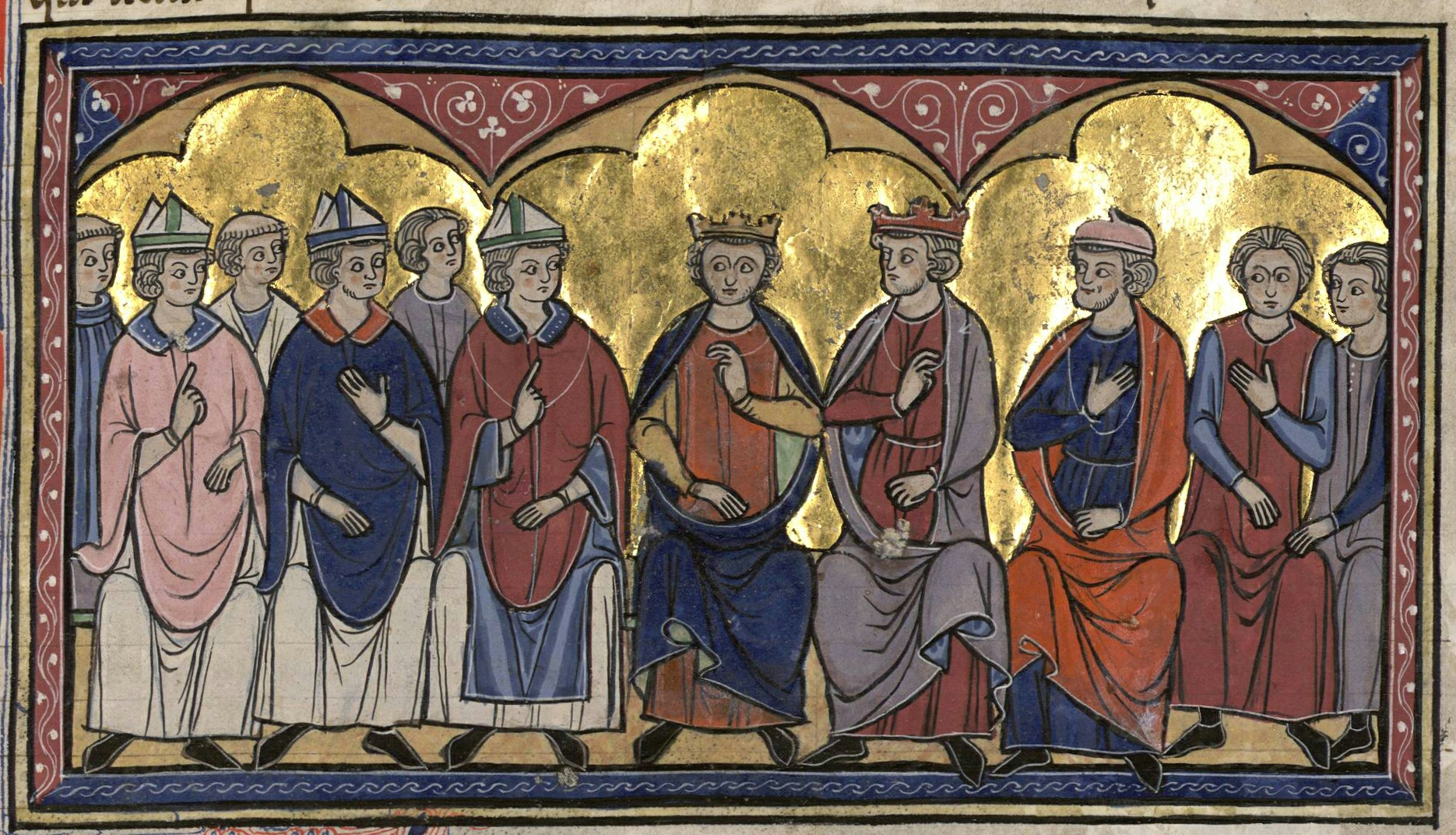
13th century depiction of the Council of Acre.

Crusader states and Muslim-ruled realms prior to the Fall of Edessa (c.1140)

The Council of Acre was a meeting of top nobles and commanders of the Second Crusade held on 24 June 1148 O.S. near the city of Acre in the Crusader Kingdom of Jerusalem. It was called so that the participants could decide what military targets the crusade should adopt, but in fact ratified a decision privately made a month earlier to lay siege to Damascus.

William of Tyre, writing more than a century later, said Damascus was chosen because it was a "menace" to the Kingdom of Jerusalem. Modern historians have largely dismissed that rationale, and provide several, sometimes conflicting, reasons for why an attack on Damascus was preferred.

Attendees included Conrad III of Germany, King of the Romans; Louis VII, King of France; Baldwin III, King of Jerusalem; Melisende, Queen Jerusalem; Fulcher, Patriarch of Jerusalem; and representatives from the Knights Templar and Knights Hospitaller. Dozens of French, German, and Jerusalemite nobles, as well as some Catholic clergy, also attended.

The siege of Damascus failed, and the Crusader retreat led to heavy casualties.

== Background ==
The Muslim emir of Aleppo, Imad ad-Din Zengi, overran the Crusader realm of the County of Edessa in December 1144, nearly razing the city of Edessa and killing most of the realm's Christian inhabitants. In response, Pope Eugene III in December 1145 called for a Second Crusade to retake the kingdom.

In the fall of 1147, Conrad III of Germany and Louis VII of France each led an army across Anatolia toward the Levant. Nine-tenths of Conrad's army of 30,000 to 35,000 combatants was wiped out by mounted Turkish archers three days out of Dorylaeum. What was left of the Germany force joined the French at Lopadium, but nearly all of the Germans fell ill at Ephesus and they returned to Constantinople to recuperate. Louis led the French army south toward Adalia, but three-fourths of his 30,000 to 35,000 combatants were killed when the Turks attacked the undisciplined march at Mount Cadmus.

After reaching Adalia, Louis sailed to Antioch, arriving on 19 March 1148 O.S. Raymond of Poitiers, ruler of the Principality of Antioch, wanted Louis to help him conquer Aleppo, Shaizar, and other nearby Muslim-held cities. (Note: Antioch had been under Byzantine control until 1084. It was one of the first cities taken by the First Crusade. The crusaders had earlier promised to return the city to the Byzantine emperor, but refused to do so. Raymond of Poitiers became king of Antioch by marriage to the child princess Constance of Antioch in 1136. The Byzantines besieged Antioch in 1137, and forced Raymond to submit. Raymond was permitted to hold the Principality of Antioch until such time as the Byzantines conquered Aleppo, Shaizar, Hama, and Homs. If they did so, Raymond would be forced to abandon Antioch for these cities. Raymond believed that if he conquered these cities without Byzantine support, the agreement of 1137 would be obviated. Additionally, Raymond had quarreled with Joscelin II of Edessa, and had little interest in recapturing the County of Edessa for him.) In mid-May, Louis refused, wanting to go to Jerusalem as quickly as possible. He even refused to help Raymond upon his return north. (Note: The reasons for the French king's decision have confounded historians. William of Tyre said Louis wished to fulfill his crusader vow to visit Jerusalem, and historian Jonathan Phillips notes that Louis was almost certainly aware by now that Conrad III had landed at Acre. Louis may have wished to rush south to join up with the most senior king in Europe. Philips also points out that this did not require Louis to also refuse to help once he had done so. Phillips suggests the French army's manpower losses and a lack of funds to keep his army in the field mitigated against any agreement to help Raymond. Louis may also have learned that the city of Edessa had practically been razed and nearly all the Christians in the county killed, leaving little to fight for. Louis also had no desire to enrage Manuel I by helping Raymond.)

Conrad arrived at Acre in April, and after celebrating Easter there went to Jerusalem.

== Prior decision in Jerusalem ==
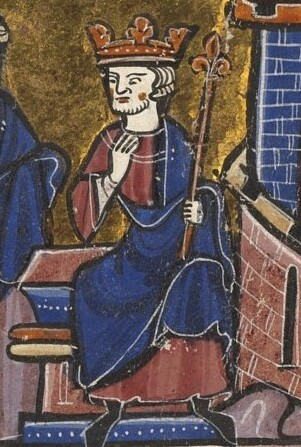
Baldwin III of Jerusalem

In May 1148, Baldwin III, King of Jerusalem, held a private meeting in Jerusalem attended by Conrad, Patriarch of Jerusalem Fulcher, and representatives from the Knights Templar. The group discussed possible targets for the crusaders, and settled on Damascus. Afterward, Fulcher was sent to Louis VII, who was now at Acre. Historian Hans Eberhard Mayer argues that Fulcher must have informed Louis about the decision reached in Jerusalem, and likely persuaded him that it was the right choice. (Note: Mayer reasons that Louis must have accepted the decision, which is why he then marched with his army to Jerusalem instead of attacking some other target.)

== Target of the crusaders ==
The Council of Acre was held in Palmarea, a suburb of Acre, on 24 June 1148 O.S. It was also a meeting of the High Court of Jerusalem (Haute Cour), which under the constitution of the kingdom had to advise the king on issues of war. (Note: The Haute Cour consisted of about two dozen "nobles" (or great tenants-in-chief). The king had the sole prerogative to make treaties, declare war, and make peace, but such decisions were always taken after consultation with the Haute Cour. The king had no standing army; under feudal law, the Kingdom of Jerusalem raised its army from levies on barons and knights. For these individuals to meet the levies enthusiastically, their opinions had to be heard and faithfully considered.) The Council of Acre was the largest meeting of Crusader rulers ever assembled, even though there were no representatives from the Crusader kingdoms of Antioch, Edessa, or Tripoli present.

No contemporary account of the Council of Acre exists, but William of Tyre, Chancellor of the Kingdom of Jerusalem and Archbishop of Tyre, writing in 1184, says that each surviving Crusader kingdom "cherished the hope that through the valiant assistance of these sovereigns who were coming they might be able to enlarge their own territories and extend their boundaries immensely. All had powerful enemies whose hated cities, so near their own territories, they longed to add to their own domains." When the council at Acre began, the discussions focused on enlarging the Kingdom of Jerusalem and how best to do that. He wrote that various plans were proposed, the pros and cons of each fully debated, and the "unanimous" decision reached that the Second Crusade should lay siege to the city of Damascus. Damascus was chosen because it was a "great menace" to the Kingdom of Jerusalem.

Historian Nicholas Morton says the other option the council considered was attacking the city of Ascalon on the coast to the west. Seizing Ascalon would significantly improve the security of the Kingdom of Jerusalem as well as give it a base from which to attack the Fatimid Caliphate in Egypt. If Damascus was taken, however, the Kingdom of Jerusalem would have control over the critical agricultural districts of Hauran in Syria and the Beqaa Valley in Lebanon as well as the highlands of Transjordan. (Note: The Kingdom of Jerusalem had routinely raided the Hauran for crops since 1100. From 1110 to about 1117, the Crusader states of Jerusalem and Tripoli had treaty rights to one-third of the crops of the Beqaa Valley as well.) Moreover, Ascalon was already ringed with Crusader castles and had been blockaded for more than a decade.

Reconquering the County of Edessa was apparently not discussed, as the city was almost in ruins and the Christian population now non-existent.

The Council of Acre likely had no other choice than to approve Damascus as the target, given the existing support by Conrad, Baldwin, Fulcher, the Knights Templar, and Louis.

== Rationales ==
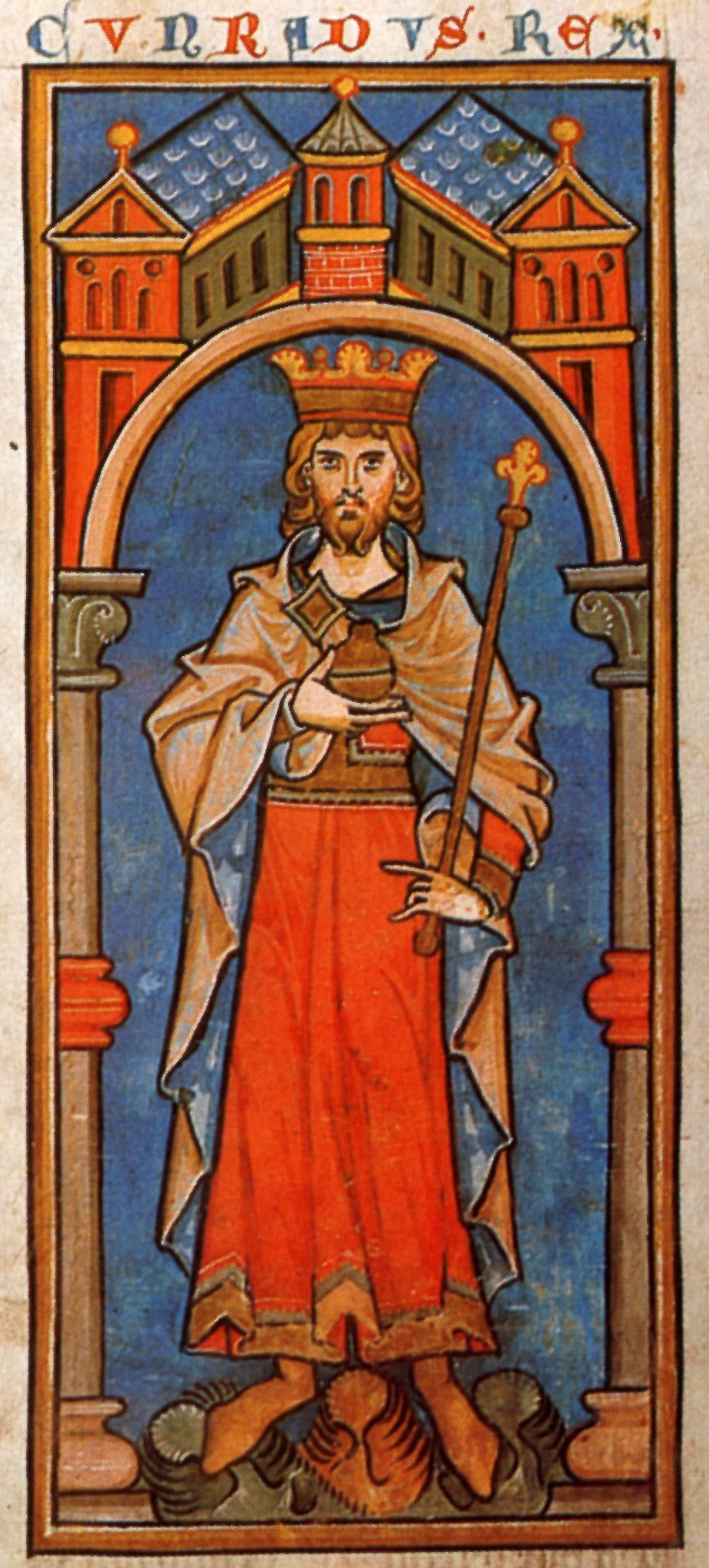
Conrad III

=== Problems confronting a siege of Damascus ===
The historical consensus is that attacking Damascus was "rash", "militarily indefensible", and "foolish".

Crusaders had never conquered a major Muslim city without first spending years attacking and subduing the surrounding countryside, and even then had done so only after a very long siege. The Kingdom of Jerusalem had no castles or bases anywhere near Damascus, so the Second Crusade would have besiege a city some 60 kilometres (37 mi) inside enemy territory. Historically, Crusaders were extremely adverse to campaigning deep in enemy territory. The city's population of 40,000 included very few Christian citizens, and practically all the people were staunchly loyal to Seljuk empire. Without a significant portion of the population in revolt against Muslim rule, the Second Crusade would need an army of more than 40,000 to successfully conquer a city the size of Damascus or make provision for some way of winning over the populace (neither of which it had).

The Second Crusade also faced an extremely formidable enemy. Turkish light cavalry were well-suited to hit-and-run attacks and trained to be tactically flexible in the field, while Crusader armies were slow-moving and relied on heavily standardized methods of attack and defence.

Baldwin III also knew that Muslim reinforcements were almost certain to arrive once the siege began. There were large numbers of Turks in the Hauran region, and they would almost certainly respond within just a few days. (Note: The argument could be made that most of these Turks had made their annual migration to the northern Jazira Region in late spring. Even so, they could be back at Damascus within a few days.) Besieged cities also called for assistance from other large cities in the area. The army of Nur ad-Din Zangi of Aleppo was almost certainly in a state of readiness and able to move quickly, as it was well known that the Crusaders would be campaigning that summer. It had taken ad-Din only a few days to respond to Baldwin's attack on Bosra the previous year, so Baldwin knew that the Second Crusade have to face huge reinforcements within days of beginning the siege.

In the past, Crusaders had almost never maintained a siege once reinforcements arrived. If they had to retreat, their armies were so slow-moving that withdrawals were certain to turn into slaughters.

=== The rationale in favor of Damascus ===
In the 11th and 12th centuries, control of an area in the Middle East dependend on control of major cities. By the mid-1100s, with nearly all of the coast under Crusader control, the Crusader kingdoms focused the major interior cities of Aleppo and Damascus.

Damascus was a good choice for a target because holding it would reinforce the frontier of the Kingdom of Jerusalem and offer a base for expansion eastward into Mesopotamia. In part, Damascus may also have been chosen because Damascus and the surrounding countryside were well-known to Baldwin III, the Templars, and the Hospitallers, and the city's defenses were not considered particularly strong. The Kingdom of Jerusalem even had official representatives living in the city.

The geopolitical situation in Syria had also changed. The failure of the 1124 siege of Aleppo led Jerusalemite barons to demand that Baldwin II focus on the kingdom's needs rather than those of Antioch or Edessa. After Imad al-Din Zengi seized control of Aleppo, and the military resources available to him forced all four Crusader states to look elsewhere for targets.

Both King Baldwin III and the Queen Mother, Melisende, were present at the Council of Acre. Both had been with the army of Jerusalem when it engaged in its failed attack on Bosra in 1147, and Nicholas Morton argues it is difficult to believe either of them would have approved of an attack on Damascus. For both of them to approve of such a plan, Morton says, there must have been a strong king with a great deal of influence in favor of it. Morton concludes that Conrad III is the most logical candidate. Muslim historian Ibn al-Athir, writing a century after the Second Crusade, claimed the choice of Damascus was made by Conrad, and medievalist Malcolm Barber has argued al-Athir is extremely accurate. Graham Loud believes Conrad was present, and even participated in, the Crusader attack on Damascus in 1126, and Conrad may have wanted to "finish the job" as a matter of pride. (Note: Morton notes that if Conrad was in fact the primary advocate of an attack on Damascus, it stands to reason that he would later describe the decision as "unanimous" in order to avoid being blamed for its failure.) Baldwin and Melisende's desire to maintain support from European monarchies almost certainly led them to support Conrad.

Historians Christopher Tyerman and Hans Eberhard Mayer conclude that Baldwin III wanted to seize Damascus as a way of asserting his authority over Queen Mother Melisende. (Note: Melisende, her husband Fulk, and her two-year-old son Baldwin III had jointly inherited the crown of the Kingdom of Jerusalem upon the death of Baldwin II in 1131. Fulk died in 1143. Since Baldwin was only 13 years old and Kings of Jerusalem came into their majority at the age of 15, Melisende became the sole ruler. Even when her regency over Baldwin ended in 1145, she still claimed the right to rule the kingdom under her father's will. She did so until 1152.) Taking Ascalon would increase the power of Baldwin's brother, Amalric Count of Jaffa, who supported Melisende. Damascus, on the other hand, would benefit Baldwin by limiting Nur ad-Din's power.

Morton dismisses the theory that Baldwin encouraged an attack on Damascus because he wanted it to fail. This theory is based on the idea that either Baldwin or Crusader commanders thought a disaster would undermine Melisende. He contends that Baldwin was too pragmatic to put his army at risk merely to score political points on his mother. Baldwin firmly believed that support from Europe was critical to the security of the Kingdom of Jerusalem. A rout at Damascus would put that support at risk. Mayer contends Melisende would not have wanted it to fail for the same reasons.

== Aftermath of the council ==
The Siege of Damascus was disastrous. The combined Crusader force attacked the city beginning 24 July, and abandoned the effort on 28 July after news arrived that reinforcements were coming from the city of Homs. Muslim archers harassed the Crusader army most of the way to Banias, exacting heavy casualties on the infantry.

The Crusaders blamed each other, and there were rumors that one or more of the Crusader commanders had been bribed to give up the siege.

As had been feared, Nur ad-Din used the opportunity to impose his power over Damascus, and was in personal control of the city by 1154.

== Participants ==
William of Tyre listed numerous participants at the council.

The Germans and others allied to the Holy Roman Empire included:

- Conrad III of Germany
- Otto, Bishop of Freising
- Stephan of Bar, Bishop of Metz
- Henry of Lorraine, Bishop of Toul
- Theodwin, Bishop of Porto, papal legate
- Henry II Jasomirgott, Duke of Bavaria and Margrave of Austria
- Duke Welf VI
- Frederick III, Duke of Swabia
- Herman III, Margrave of Baden
- Berthold III of Andechs
- William V, Marquess of Montferrat
- Guy, Count of Biandrate

There were also "other noted men of high rank, whose names and titles we do not recall."

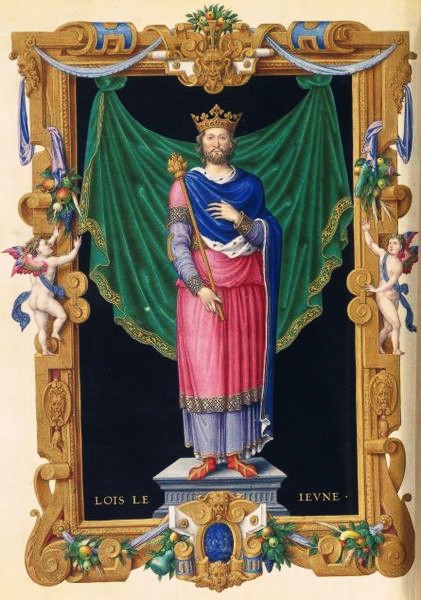
King Louis VII of France attended the council.

From the French, participants included:

- Louis VII of France
- Godefroy de la Rochetaillée, Bishop of Langres
- Arnulf, Bishop of Lisieux
- Guy of Florence, cardinal priest of San Crisogono, papal legate
- Robert I of Dreux
- Henry I, Count of Champagne
- Thierry, Count of Flanders
- Ivo de Nesle

"Many other important nobles of high rank were also present...but since it would take too long to record them here, their names are intentionally omitted."

From the Kingdom of Jerusalem, attendees included:

- Baldwin III of Jerusalem
- Melisende of Jerusalem
- Patriarch Fulk of Jerusalem
- Baldwin II, Archbishop of Caesarea
- Robert I, Archbishop of Nazareth
- Rorgo, Bishop of Acre
- Bernard, Bishop of Sidon
- William, Bishop of Beirut
- Adam, Bishop of Banyas
- Gerald, Bishop of Bethlehem
- Manasses of Hierges
- Philip of Nablus
- Elinand of Tiberias
- Gerard Grenier
- Walter of Caesarea
- Pagan the Butler
- Barisan of Ibelin
- Humphrey II of Toron
- Guy I Brisebarre of Beirut

"...and many others."

Others

Robert of Craon, Grand Master of the Knights Templar, and Raymond du Puy de Provence, Grand Master of the Knights Hospitaller, were also present.

== Bibliography ==
- Baldwin, Marshall W. (1969) [1955]. "The Latin States under Baldwin III and Amalric I, 1143–1174; The Decline and Fall of Jerusalem, 1174–1189". In Setton, Kenneth M.; Baldwin, Marshall W. (eds.). A History of the Crusades, Volume I: The First Hundred Years. Vol. 1 (Second ed.). Madison, Milwaukee, and London: University of Wisconsin Press. pp. 528–561, 590–621. ISBN 0-299-04834-9.
- Barber, Malcolm (2012). The Crusader States. New Haven, Conn.: Yale University Press. ISBN 9780300113129.
- Carey, Brian Todd; Allfree, Joshua B.; Cairns, John (2022). Warfare in the Age of Crusades: The Latin East. Barnsley, South Yorkshire, UK: Pen & Sword Military. ISBN 9781526730213.
- Claster, Jill (2009). Sacred Violence: The European Crusades to the Middle East, 1095-1396. Toronto: University of Toronto Press. ISBN 9781442600584.
- Evans, Austin P. (1943). "Introduction". In Evans, Austin P. (ed.). A History of Deeds Done Beyond the Sea. Volume 1. Translated by Babcock, Emily Atwater; Krey, August C. New York: Columbia University Press. OCLC 1293984682.
- Madden, Thomas (2005). The New Concise History of the Crusades. Lanham, Md.: Rowman & Littlefield. ISBN 9780742538238.
- Mayer, Hans Eberhard (1972). "Studies in the History of Queen Melisende of Jerusalem" (PDF). Dumbarton Oaks Papers. 26: 93–182. doi:10.2307/1291317. JSTOR 1291317.
- Michaud, Joseph Francois (1900). The History of the Crusades, Volume I. Translated by Robson, W. New York: A.C. Armstrong & Son. OCLC 1152328188.
- Morton, Nicholas (2020). The Crusader States and Their Neighbours: A Military History, 1099-1187. Oxford, UK: Oxford University Press. ISBN 9780198824541.
- Phillips, Jonathan (2007). The Second Crusade: Extending the Frontiers of Christianity. New Haven, Conn.: Yale University Press. ISBN 9780300112740.
- Prawer, Joshua (1972). The Latin Kingdom of Jerusalem: European Colonialism in the Middle Ages. London: Weidenfeld and Nicolson. ISBN 9780297993971.
- Schmieder, Felicitas; O'Doherty, Marianne (2015). Travels and Mobilities in the Middle Ages: From the Atlantic to the Black Sea. Turnhout, Belgium: Brepols Publishers. ISBN 9782503554495.
- Tyerman, Christopher (2006). God's War: A New History of the Crusades. Cambridge, Mass.: The Belknap Press of Harvard University Press. ISBN 9780140269802.
- William of Tyre (1943). Evans, Austin P. (ed.). A History of Deeds Done Beyond the Sea. Volume 1. Translated by Babcock, Emily Atwater; Krey, August C. New York: Columbia University Press. OCLC 1293984682.
