= Amalric of Jerusalem =

King of Jerusalem from 1163 to 1174

Amalric
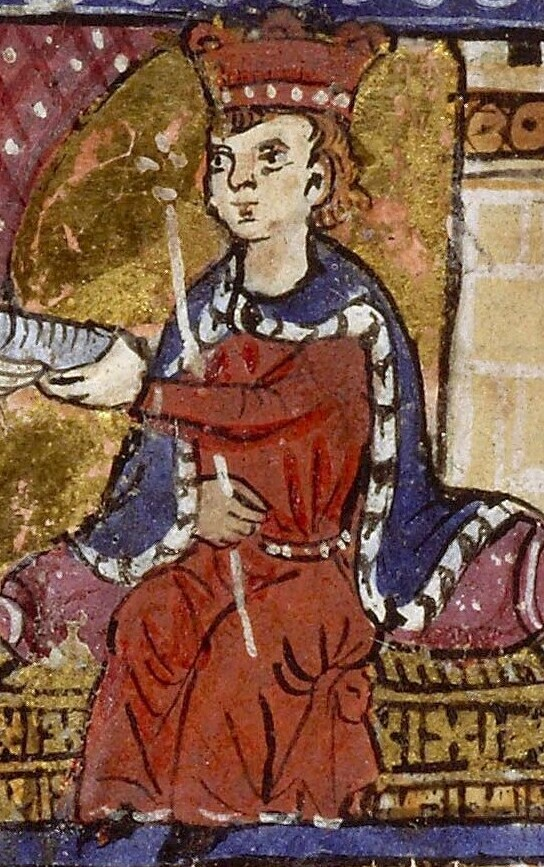

King of Jerusalem
- Reign: 1163–1174
- Coronation: 18 February 1163
- Predecessor: Baldwin III
- Successor: Baldwin IV
- Born: 1136
- Died: 11 July 1174 (aged 37–38); Jerusalem
- Spouses: Agnes of Courtenay (m. 1157; ann. 1163) Maria Komnene (m. 1167)
- Issue: Sibylla of Jerusalem; Baldwin IV of Jerusalem; Isabella I of Jerusalem
- House: Anjou
- Father: Fulk V of Anjou
- Mother: Melisende of Jerusalem

Amalric (French: Amaury; 1136 – 11 July 1174), formerly known in historiography as Amalric I, (Note: The name of a later king of Jerusalem, Aimery of Lusignan, was frequently mistranscribed as "Amaury", leading to him being known as "Amaury II" and the true Amaury as "Amaury I".) was the king of Jerusalem from 1163 until his death. His Muslim adversaries described him as the bravest and cleverest of the Crusader kings.

Amalric was the younger son of King Fulk and Queen Melisende. His elder brother, King Baldwin III, served as their mother's co-ruler. Melisende made Amalric the count of Jaffa, and he took her side in her conflict with Baldwin until Baldwin deposed her in 1152. From 1154, Amalric was fully reconciled with his brother and was made count of both Jaffa and Ascalon. In 1157, he married Agnes of Courtenay despite the misgivings of the Church and had two children with her, Sibylla and Baldwin. When his brother died in 1163, Amalric was obliged to leave Agnes in order to be recognized as king. He was crowned on 18 February.

Amalric's reign was marked by a ceaseless struggle with the Muslim atabeg of Damascus and Aleppo, Nur al-Din Zengi, and persistent attempts to subjugate Egypt. In his first invasion he induced the vizier, Dirgham, to pay tribute, and in the following two he supported the rival vizier, Shawar, against Dirgham and Nur al-Din's general Shirkuh. Nur al-Din took advantage of the king's expeditions to Egypt to wreak havoc on the kingdom and the northern crusader states, Antioch and Tripoli, and Amalric had to intervene in the north as well. Throughout his reign Amalric sought support of Western European rulers in his struggle against the Muslims of Syria and Egypt, but concluded the most concrete alliance with the Byzantine emperor, Manuel I Komnenos, whose grandniece Maria became Amalric's second wife. They had a daughter, Isabella.

In 1167, Amalric again prevented Shirkuh from seizing Egypt and took Alexandria. Without waiting for the Byzantines, and in contravention of his treaty with Shawar, he invaded Egypt in 1167–68 with the intention to conquer it, but it fell to Shirkuh instead. Shirkuh died in 1169, and Amalric launched an invasion in concert with Manuel, but the two armies cooperated poorly and failed in their attempt. Shirkuh's successor, Saladin, emerged as a major threat. Amalric's only son, Baldwin, started exhibiting symptoms of leprosy during Amalric's lifetime. Amalric sought a husband for his daughter, Sibylla, but her suitor, Count Stephen I of Sancerre, declined and left the kingdom. While trying to take advantage of the confusion in Syria following the death of Nur al-Din in 1174, Amalric caught dysentery and died on 11 July. He was succeeded by his son, Baldwin IV.

== Youth ==
=== Childhood ===
On his deathbed in 1131, King Baldwin II conferred the Kingdom of Jerusalem–one of the crusader states established by the Latin Christians who invaded the Levant and defeated its Muslim rulers–on his eldest daughter, Melisende; her husband, Fulk of Anjou; and their infant son, Baldwin. Fulk was considerably older than Melisende and had adult children in Europe from his first marriage, including Count Geoffrey V of Anjou and Countess Sibylla of Flanders. He excluded Melisende from power until she and the barons forced him to acknowledge her as co-ruler in 1135. Fulk was eager to be reconciled, and historian Malcolm Barber suggests that Melisende agreed because the succession of her family rested on only one son. The couple consequently conceived Amalric in late 1135 or early 1136. To the north of the kingdom were three more crusader states: the County of Tripoli, the Principality of Antioch, and the County of Edessa. Antioch and Tripoli were ruled by the families of Melisende's sisters Alice and Hodierna.

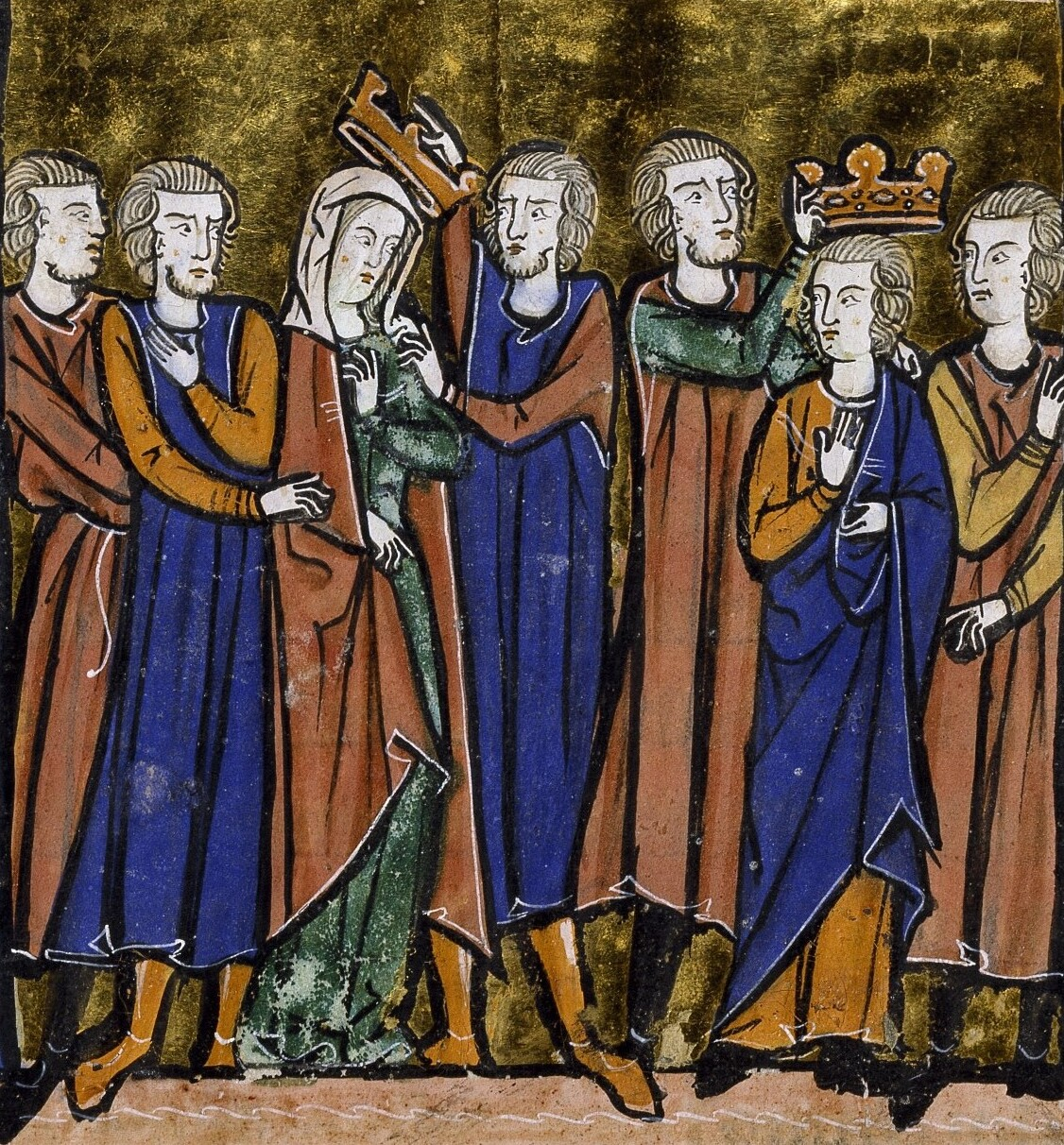
Amalric's mother, Melisende, and brother, Baldwin III, were crowned together, but Melisende refused to share power.

Amalric's father, King Fulk, was fatally injured in a horse-riding accident on a family outing near Acre in 1143. He died on 10 November. Queen Melisende seized power and was crowned again on 25 December, this time alongside her elder son, the 13-year-old King Baldwin III. In 1144, the Turkic Muslim atabeg of Mosul, Imad al-Din Zengi captured Edessa. This prompted the Second Crusade, which failed in its objective to conquer Damascus, one of the greatest Muslim-held cities. Melisende continued to withhold power from Baldwin after he reached the age of majority; by 1151, their relationship had broken down. In 1151, Melisende bestowed on Amalric the County of Jaffa as part of her endeavor to consolidate her position against Baldwin. Amalric became his mother's most important partisan besides the Church.

=== Countship ===
In 1152, King Baldwin III besieged his mother, Queen Melisende, and her most loyal men, including Amalric, Viscount Rohard the Elder, and Philip of Milly, in the Tower of David in Jerusalem. Although they put up a defense, Melisende was deposed; by the end of April, Baldwin was the sole ruler of the kingdom. Based on charter evidence, Mayer concludes that Baldwin punished Amalric for siding with their mother by depriving him of the County of Jaffa in 1152. The king conquered Ascalon from Fatimid Egypt in 1153 and forced the Egyptians to pay a tribute. He granted both Ascalon and Jaffa to Amalric. Historian Hans E. Mayer dates Amalric's acquisition of the double county to shortly after July 1154.

In 1157, Amalric married Agnes of Courtenay, whose father, Count Joscelin II of Edessa, was the dispossessed second cousin of Queen Melisende. Agnes was a widow since the death in battle of her first husband, Reynald of Marash. The Latin patriarch of Jerusalem, Fulcher of Angoulême, objected to Amalric's marriage with Agnes. According to contemporary chronicler William of Tyre, Fulcher disapproved because of the couple's kinship; but the late-13th-century Lignages d'Outremer states that Agnes had been betrothed to the lord of Ramla, Hugh of Ibelin, and that Amalric married her when she came to marry Hugh, which the patriarch deemed uncanonical. Mayer argues that Agnes had already been married to Hugh in 1157, making her marriage to Amalric bigamous and, in Barber's opinion, possibly the result of an abduction. The historian Bernard Hamilton rejects this interpretation and states that a bigamous marriage would have resulted in the excommunication of both Amalric and Agnes. Fulcher died in November 1157, possibly before the couple married.

In 1159, Amalric accompanied King Baldwin to Antioch, where they welcomed Emperor Manuel I Komnenos. Baldwin and Manuel were allied through Baldwin's marriage with Manuel's niece Theodora. Both Baldwin and Amalric placed a great value on good relations with the Byzantine Empire, a Greek Orthodox state that claimed suzerainty over the Christian states in the Levant. Amalric and Agnes had a daughter, Sibylla, between 1157 and 1161 and a son, Baldwin, in 1161. The children were named after Amalric's siblings.

Amalric's close family and relationship with Frankish leaders

Gabriel of Melitene	Hugh I of Rethel	Melisende of Montlhéry	Isabella of Montlhéry
Morphia of Melitene	Baldwin II of Jerusalem	Hodierna of Rethel	Joscelin I of Edessa
Eremburga of Maine	Fulk V of Anjou	Melisende of Jerusalem	Alice of Jerusalem	Hodierna of Jerusalem	Ioveta of Jerusalem	Manasses of Hierges	Joscelin II of Edessa
Geoffrey V of Anjou	Sibylla of Anjou	Baldwin III of Jerusalem	Amalric of Jerusalem	Constance of Antioch	Raymond III of Tripoli	Melisende of Tripoli	Joscelin of Courtenay	Agnes of Courtenay
Henry II of England	Philip I of Flanders	Bohemond III of Antioch	Maria of Antioch	Manuel I Komnenos

== Accession ==
Amalric's mother, Queen Melisende, died on 11 September 1161. His brother, King Baldwin, barely outlived her. He came down with dysentery while visiting Antioch in late 1162 and died in Beirut on 10 February 1163. Baldwin and Theodora had had no children, and Amalric was thus his heir. The chronicler Ernoul relates that Baldwin named Amalric as his heir.

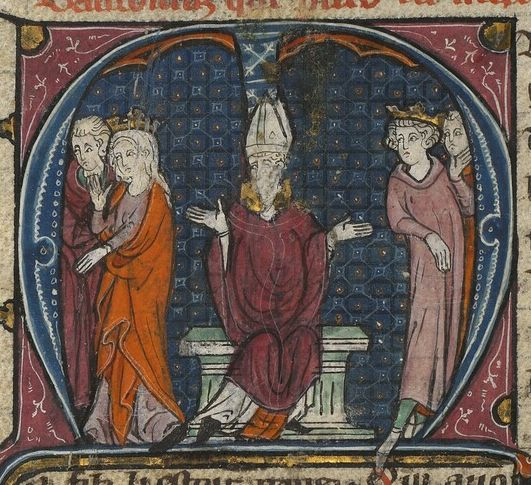
Amalric's separation from his wife, Agnes, was the condition for his coronation.

Having convened to discuss the succession, the High Court refused to recognize Amalric as king unless he repudiated his wife, Agnes. Their spokesman was the patriarch, Amalric of Nesle. According to William of Tyre, the patriarch objected because of the couple's kinship. Barber describes this story as "so unlikely that historians have been unwilling to accept it at face value". Hamilton notes that such an objection to an established marriage was "extremely unusual", and argues that behind it stood a "deep-seated animosity" of the barons towards Agnes. Amalric accepted the High Court's demand, and his marriage to Agnes was annulled on the grounds of consanguinity. Cardinal John of Santi Giovanni e Paolo al Celio, the legate of Pope Alexander III, was present. Amalric obtained papal confirmation of the legitimacy of his children, Sibylla and Baldwin, and exoneration of Agnes from any moral censure. On 18 February, the day of Baldwin III's funeral, the patriarch crowned Amalric in the Church of the Holy Sepulchre.

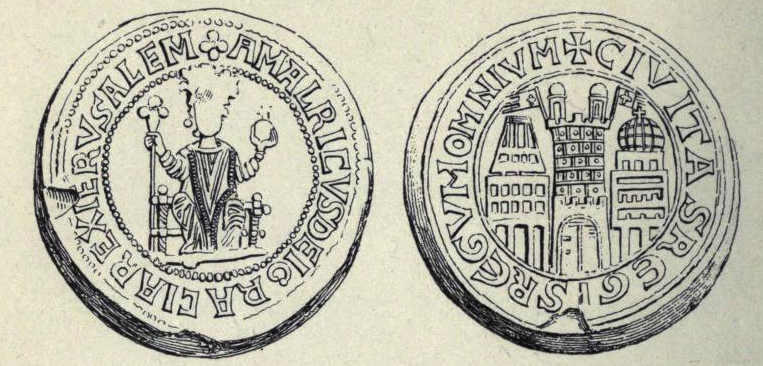
Amalric as depicted on his seal

Early in his reign Amalric strengthened his position against his most powerful vassals (tenants-in-chief) by passing the Assise sur la ligece. This legislation enabled the vassals of the powerful vassals to appeal directly to the king if their lord did them injustice. 13th-century jurists John of Ibelin and Philip of Novara believed that the assise resulted from Amalric's war with the lord of Sidon, Gerard Grenier, who had unjustly seized a fief from one of his vassals, but contemporary chroniclers Michael the Syrian and Ibn al-Athir say that it was Baldwin III who defeated Gerard.

== Reign ==
=== Vizierate of Shawar ===
==== Intervention in Egypt ====
Crusader states and their neighbors in 1165

Amalric's chief aim as king was to conquer Egypt. Its government was in disarray: Dirgham and Shawar, rival viziers, fought for power while the Fatimid caliph was sidelined. Zengi's son Nur ad-Din unified the Muslim principalities of Syria by bringing the great cities of Damascus and Aleppo under his rule; if he were to conquer Egypt as well, the crusader states would be encircled. Although his lords were preoccupied with extending their own holdings, Amalric could not ignore Egypt, and in this had the support of the masters of the military orders, the Knights Hospitaller and the Knights Templar.

In 1163, the Egyptian government failed to pay the tribute. In response Amalric came with a large force within 35 miles (56 km) of the capital, Cairo, and besieged Bilbais. Dirgham, who had driven out Shawar, desperately attempted to fend off the invaders by opening the floodbanks on the Nile, but ended up agreeing to pay an even larger tribute and surrendered hostages as guarantees. After returning to Jerusalem, Amalric wrote to King Louis VIII of France that it was only the annual flooding of the Nile that prevented him from taking Bilbais.

Shawar appealed to Nur ad-Din for help against Dirgham. Nur ad-Din dispatched Asad al-Din Shirkuh, one of his most able generals, who helped Shawar defeat Dirgham and seize power. Shirkuh then decided to conquer Egypt for himself, forcing Shawar to request help from Amalric. After Shawar offered a once again increased tribute, the king undertook his second Egyptian expedition, fully financed by Shawar, in July 1164. The invasion ended in Shirkuh's defeat and Amalric's restoration of Shawar to power.

==== Turkic threat ====
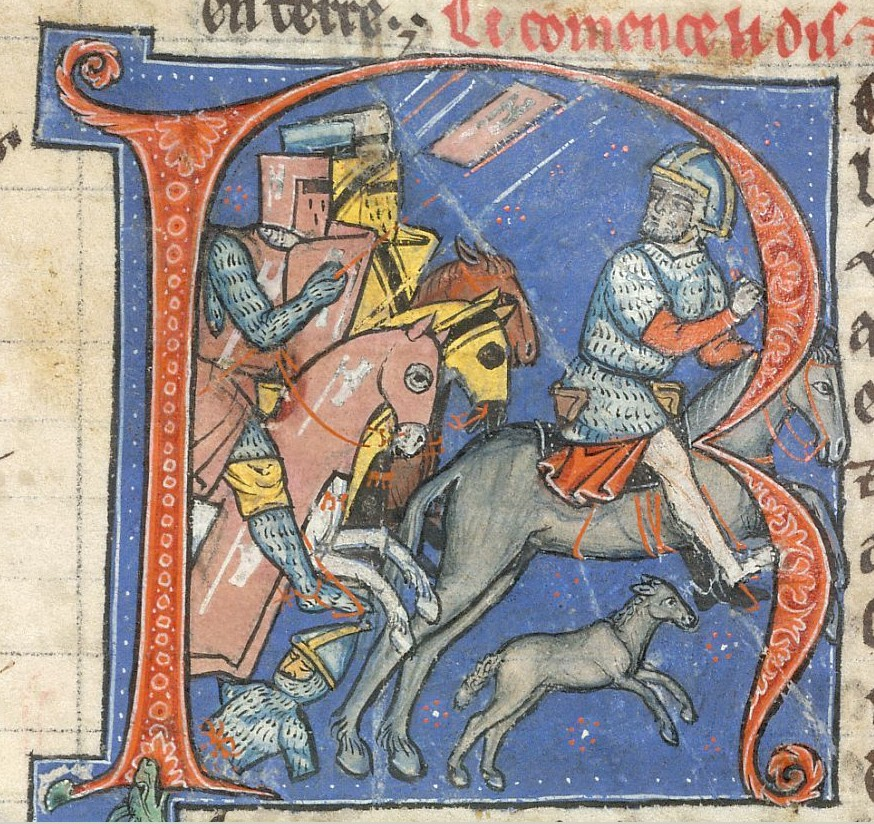
Nur ad-Din emerged from the battle of Artah victorious and with several key captives.

Nur ad-Din could not afford to allow Amalric to control Egypt. The king's southern expedition left the kingdom and the northern crusader states undefended, which allowed Nur ad-Din to act. In the battle of Artah on 10 August 1164 he destroyed a large Christian army and captured Prince Bohemond III of Antioch, Count Raymond III of Tripoli, Joscelin III of Edessa, and the Byzantine governor of Cilicia, Constantine Coloman. On 12 August, he captured Harim. Amalric's brother-in-law Count Thierry of Flanders arrived with numerous knights, but this failed to deter Nur ad-Din. Amalric returned to Jerusalem in October, and immediately hurried north with Thierry. Raymond declared that, during his captivity, Amalric should rule Tripoli. The king thus stopped at Tripoli to establish his rule, and then proceeded further north to install governors in the cities of Bohemond's principality.

On 18 October 1164, Nur ad-Din captured Banias, described by Patriarch Amalric as "the gateway to the whole kingdom". The king and the master of the Knights Templar, Bertrand of Blancfort, declared that Banias had been sold by traitors. In mid-1165, King Amalric secured the release of Prince Bohemond. Amalric and Bertrand's attempts to entice the king of France to assist in their planned conquest of Egypt proved fruitless, and so the Christian leaders continued to court the Byzantines. In late 1165, the king sent an embassy led by the royal butler, Odo of Saint-Amand, and the archbishop of Caesarea, Ernesius, to arrange a royal marriage with a member of Emperor Manuel's family.

In late 1165, Philip of Milly resigned the lordship of Oultrejordain to join the Templars. His sole heir was his elder daughter, Helena, who was married to the lord of Beirut, Walter III Brisebarre. When Walter and his brothers, Guy and Bernard, were captured by the Muslims, Amalric forbade anybody to lend money to them for their ransom. By 1167, the king had forced Walter to surrender Beirut in return for money. Hamilton concludes that this "sharp" treatment originated from Amalric's desire to prevent Walter from holding the great lordships of Beirut and Oultrejordain simultaneously. Around this time Emperor Manuel's cousin Andronikos Komnenos arrived in the kingdom after scandalously seducing Philippa, sister of Prince Bohemond and sister-in-law of the emperor. His bravery impressed Amalric, who gave him the lordship of Beirut in fief in 1167.

==== Third invasion of Egypt ====
William relates that a Templar garrison surrendered a cave fortress besieged by Shirkuh while Amalric was on his way to relieve them; in his anger the king hanged about a dozen Templars who were responsible. Barber dates the incident to 1166. In January 1167, before the Byzantines could assist, news reached Jerusalem that Shirkuh was marching towards Egypt at the head of a large army furnished by Nur ad-Din. Amalric called a general council at Nablus, at which funds were raised for a counter-strike, and set out from Ascalon on 30 January. Amalric rapidly mobilized an army, but failed in his attempt to catch Shirkuh before he crossed the Nile. Shawar again agreed to an annual tribute to the king of Jerusalem in return for Frankish help against Shirkuh. The Franks secured the support of the Fatimid caliph, al-Adid, but then a stalemate ensued between them and Shirkuh as the opposing forces were encamped on the opposite banks of the Nile.

For over a month, Amalric waited for enforcements from his constable, Humphrey II of Toron, and Philip of Milly. The king then secretly moved his men 8 miles (13 km) south, leaving some to protect the young caliph and the wooden bridge they had raised on the Nile. A whirlwind prevented them from crossing the river, however, and so instead of catching Shirkuh by surprise, Amalric chased him with his knights for three days. On 18 March, an indecisive battle took place, after which Shirkuh subjugated Alexandria. The Franks followed him and blockaded the city until Shirkuh fled, leaving his nephew Saladin in charge. The king pursued Shirkuh until the Egyptians convinced him to attack Alexandria instead. The siege of Alexandria forced Shirkuh to sue for peace. The Franks entered Alexandria, where the king placed his banner on the city's Lighthouse, and then departed Egypt.

==== Byzantine alliance ====
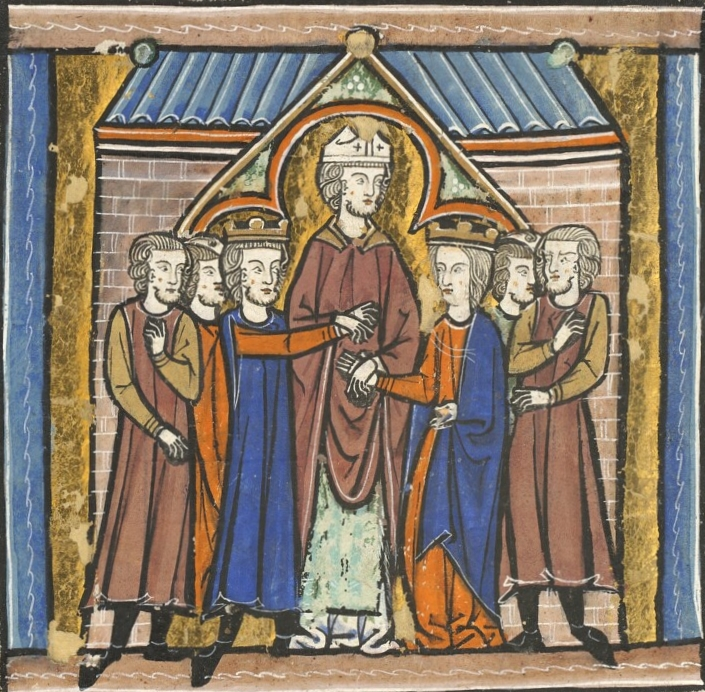
Amalric's marriage with Maria Komnene was a token of his alliance with Emperor Manuel.

King Amalric returned to his kingdom on 21 August 1167. His envoys to Emperor Manuel arrived with his new bride, the emperor's grandniece Maria Komnene. On 29 August, in the Cathedral of Tyre, Patriarch Amalric celebrated the king's second marriage. The new queen received Nablus as her dower. The same year, Queen Theodora, niece of Emperor Manuel and widow of Amalric's brother, eloped with the emperor's cousin Andronikos. The lovers fled to Damascus, where they were received by Nur ad-Din. The scandalous conduct of his kin enraged the emperor, but Amalric was glad to take Acre, his sister-in-law's rich dower, back into the royal domain; Beirut also reverted to Amalric.

Maria's arrival was shortly followed by that of two envoys from the emperor, Alexander of Gravina and Michael Hydruntius of Otranto. The envoys were immediately met by the king. They stated that the king and the emperor ought to conquer Egypt together lest the weakened country should fall in the hands of another. William of Tyre believed that the idea came from Amalric; Barber sees a link between his Byzantine marriage and the arrival of the envoys. A treaty was drawn up and taken by William to the emperor for ratification. In this period the king was depicted on his seal wearing a sash in the Byzantine fashion, and the two rulers cooperated in the extensive mosaic program undertaken in the Bethlehem's Church of the Nativity. Amalric was even willing to concede to Manuel on theological issues, such as the exclusion of the filioque clause from the Bethlehem church's mosaic inscriptions and the admission of Greek clergy into the Church of the Holy Sepulchre, in order to secure military assistance.

==== Attempted conquest of Egypt ====
William returned to the kingdom in late 1167 and was astonished to find that, by 20 October, King Amalric had departed on another expedition to Egypt without the Byzantines. He did not know the reason for it: he recorded the rumor that Shawar, the vizier of Egypt, had allied with Nur ad-Din, but did not himself believe in it and suggested that the vizier had faithfully kept his treaty with Amalric. Ibn al-Athir depicts the king as a reluctant invader, pressured by "the Frankish knights and policy makers". Amalric struck a deal with the Hospitallers, who pledged more men than ever before and to whom the king in return promised a vast lordship from Bilbais to the coast as well as the first pick of the spoils and the best house or palace after the king's in all the major cities of Egypt. William names the order's master, Gilbert of Assailly, as the driving force, if not the mastermind, behind the campaign. The Templars refused to participate; William speculates that they either objected to betraying Shawar or to following the lead of the Hospitallers, their rivals. Barber suggests that the Templar master, Bertrand of Blancfort, may have also resented the king's execution of some of his knights.

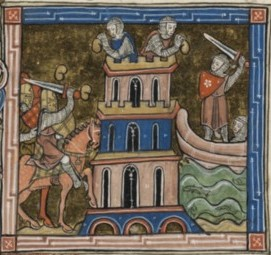
Amalric's reign saw multiple Christian attacks on Egypt.

Bilbais was captured and plundered and its inhabitants massacred in 1168 after a three-day siege. Amalric then moved onto Cairo, but Shawar burned it down to prevent the Franks from seizing it. Unable to resist, Shawar offered huge sums of money to Amalric while simultaneously petitioning Nur ad-Din for help. The Christian fleet arrived, took Tinnis, and blocked the Nile below Cairo. Shawar convinced Amalric to retreat a few miles so that Shawar could collect the money he had promised to the king; the vizier actually worked to strengthen the city's defenses and the population's morale. Ibn al-Athir reports that the inhabitants of Cairo grew resolute when they heard about the fate of the people of Bilbais. William believes that the city could have been taken but for the greed of the king, encouraged by his seneschal, Miles of Plancy: if they had taken the city by storming, they would have had to share the plunder, but all the tribute money would go to the king.

On 2 December, Shirkuh set out from Damascus with a large army and ample provisions provided by Nur ad-Din. Amalric returned to Bilbais, but Shirkuh bypassed him and encamped on the other side of the Nile. Amalric judged it too risky to attack him. On 2 January, he set out for his kingdom with his army. Not only was the expedition a complete failure, but it also delivered Egypt to Shirkuh: Shawar was soon killed, and the caliph appointed Shirkuh to succeed him. Amalric was undeterred and in mid-1169 started planning his fifth attempt to take Egypt. He appealed for help in letters sent to Emperor Frederick Barbarossa, Kings Louis VII of France and Henry II of England, Queen Margaret of Sicily, and Counts Philip I of Flanders, Theobald V of Blois, and Henry I of Champagne. Patriarch Amalric and Archbishop Ernesius, who were carrying the letters, were driven back by a severe storm at sea. He sent a new embassy, consisting of the archbishop of Tyre, Frederick de la Roche, and the bishop of Banyas, John, but to no avail.

=== Dynastic concerns ===
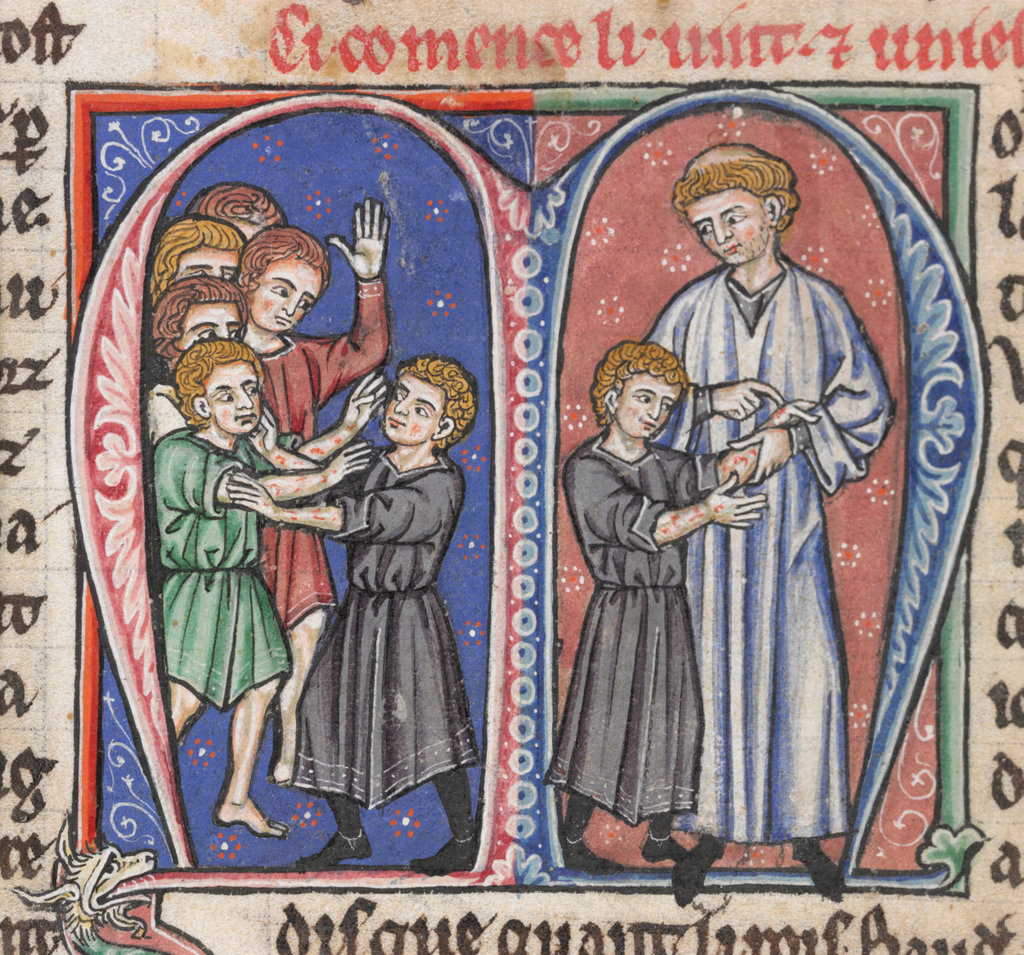
William of Tyre discovered that the king's son, Baldwin, did not feel pain when his playmates pinched him. This was the first sign of a grave illness.

King Amalric was determined that his son and heir apparent, Baldwin, should receive a good education. Amalric appointed William of Tyre, one of the kingdom's most eminent scholars, to tutor Baldwin when the boy reached the age of nine. William discovered that Baldwin did not feel pain in his right arm. The king employed Arabs to treat the boy and teach him to ride. One of them was Abu Sulayman Da'ud, a physician whom he had sought out during his campaigns in Egypt. No diagnosis was made, but Hamilton is certain that Amalric must have been informed that the symptoms pointed to the early stages of leprosy.

Amalric empowered Archbishop Frederick to arrange a marriage for Amalric's 11-year-old daughter, Sibylla during the prelate's mission in Europe. The king was then aged 33, the age at which his brother had died; and his 8-year-old son, Baldwin, had seven more years until the age of majority. Amalric had no kinsmen who could rule in Baldwin's name if Amalric died unexpectedly, as his father and brother had; Hamilton argues that the king's solution was to find a capable son-in-law. He chose the well-connected Count Stephen I of Sancerre, brother of the count of Blois and relative of both the French and the English royal house. Stephen agreed and arrived in Jerusalem with Duke Hugh III of Burgundy, bringing gifts from King Louis VII of France.

Hamilton discusses the possibility that Baldwin's symptoms had already appeared by the time Sibylla's marriage was first discussed and that Amalric thought that Sibylla and Stephen might succeed to the throne. Stephen was invited by the High Court to give his opinion on the inheritance of a fief; in Hamilton's opinion this points to Stephen being considered a possible future king. For unknown reasons Stephen refused to marry Sibylla and returned to France. Baldwin remained Amalric's only son. The king's marriage to Maria Komnene produced two daughters, of whom one died in childhood. The other, Isabella, was born about 1172.

=== Rise of the Ayyubids ===
==== Franco-Byzantine invasion of Egypt ====
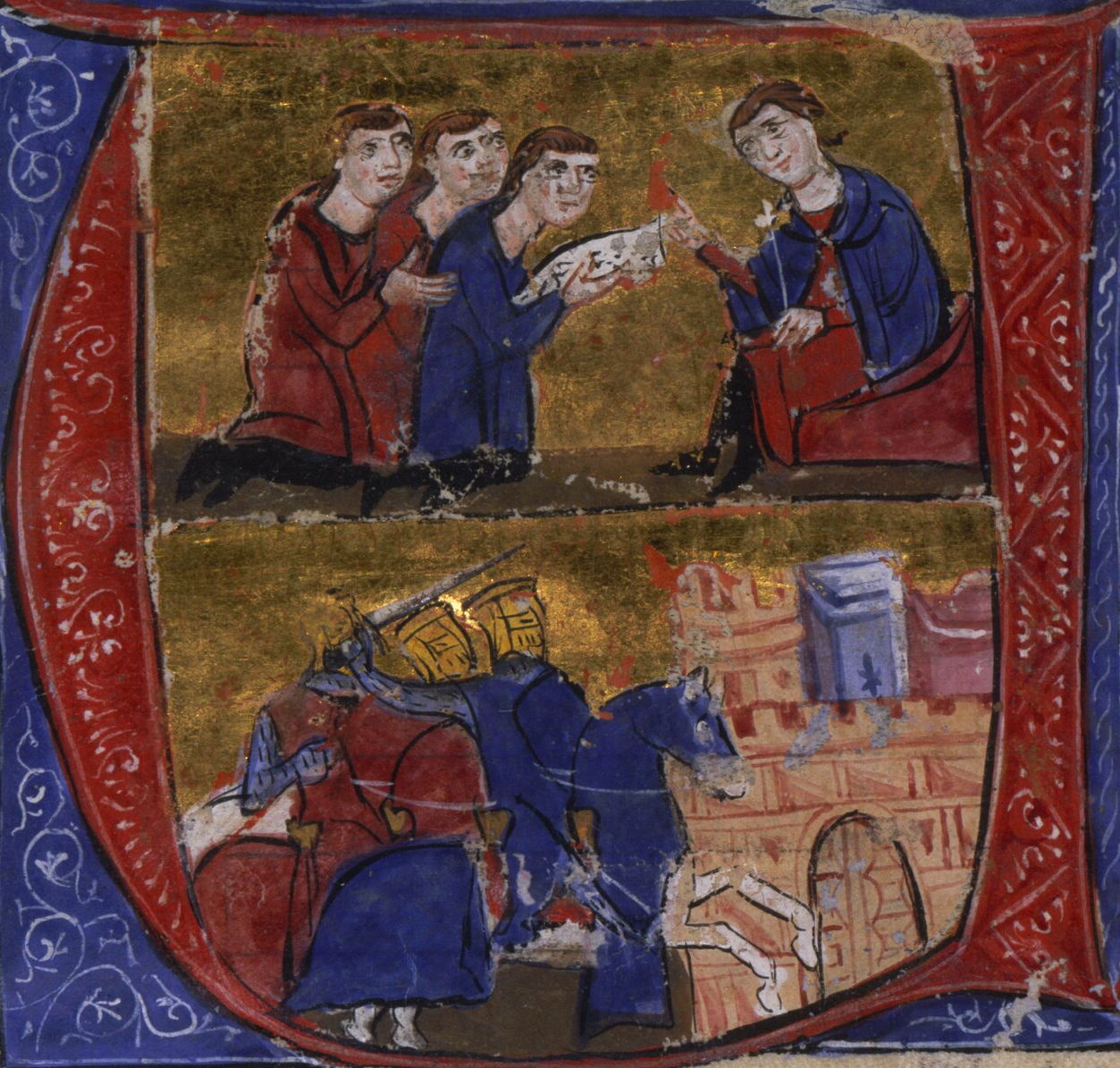
Amalric's envoys convinced Emperor Manuel to despatch a large force for a joint invasion Egypt.

The death of Bertrand of Blancfort in January 1169 paved the way for a master of the Templars who would be more compliant with Amalric's desire to subjugate Egypt. In August 1169, Philip of Milly was elected the new master. Barber considers it obvious that King Amalric influenced the election, for he and Philip had been associated since the 1150s, when both supported Amalric's mother, Queen Melisende, against his brother, King Baldwin III. In the same month, Amalric confirmed his earlier deal with the Hospitallers and also recruited the Templars. In late 1169, Emperor Manuel sent a formidable force led by experienced men, and a large fleet.

Amalric was served by the animosity of the Egyptians for their new, foreign rulers, and by the unexpected death of Shirkuh. On 16 October the king left Ascalon, shortly after the Byzantine fleet set out from Acre. Sea floods hindered him, but he reached Damietta on 27 October. The Nile was blocked north of the city, and William of Tyre is confident that Damietta could have been taken by a quick attack. The siege of the city drew out, however, because the city was reinforced by boats from the south and siege engines had to be constructed. The defenders launched a fire ship towards the Byzantine fleet, burning six ships; the king averted a greater loss by rousing the crews.

As their food ran out and the torrential rains poured, the attackers became desperate. William's informants insisted that Manuel had not sent enough supplies, whereas the Byzantine chroniclers John Kinnamos and Niketas Choniates accuse the Franks of procrastinating. The Byzantine general Andronikos Kontostephanos proposed an all-out assault, but Amalric believed that the city walls had not been battered enough by the siege engines. Kontostephanos had been instructed to obey Amalric, but made preparations to attack without him. According to Choniates, Kontostephanos had grown tired of "talking into the ear of the dead". Before Kontostephanos could act, Amalric began peace negotiations. Patriarch Michael the Syrian, ever disdainful of the Greek Orthodox, writes that the Byzantines intended to deceive Amalric and seize Egypt for themselves, and that the king took the Egyptians' offer of gold and left after he realized the Byzantines' treachery. Nur ad-Din, meanwhile, again used Amalric's absence to plunder the kingdom. Amalric and his army returned on 21 December.

==== Earthquake ====
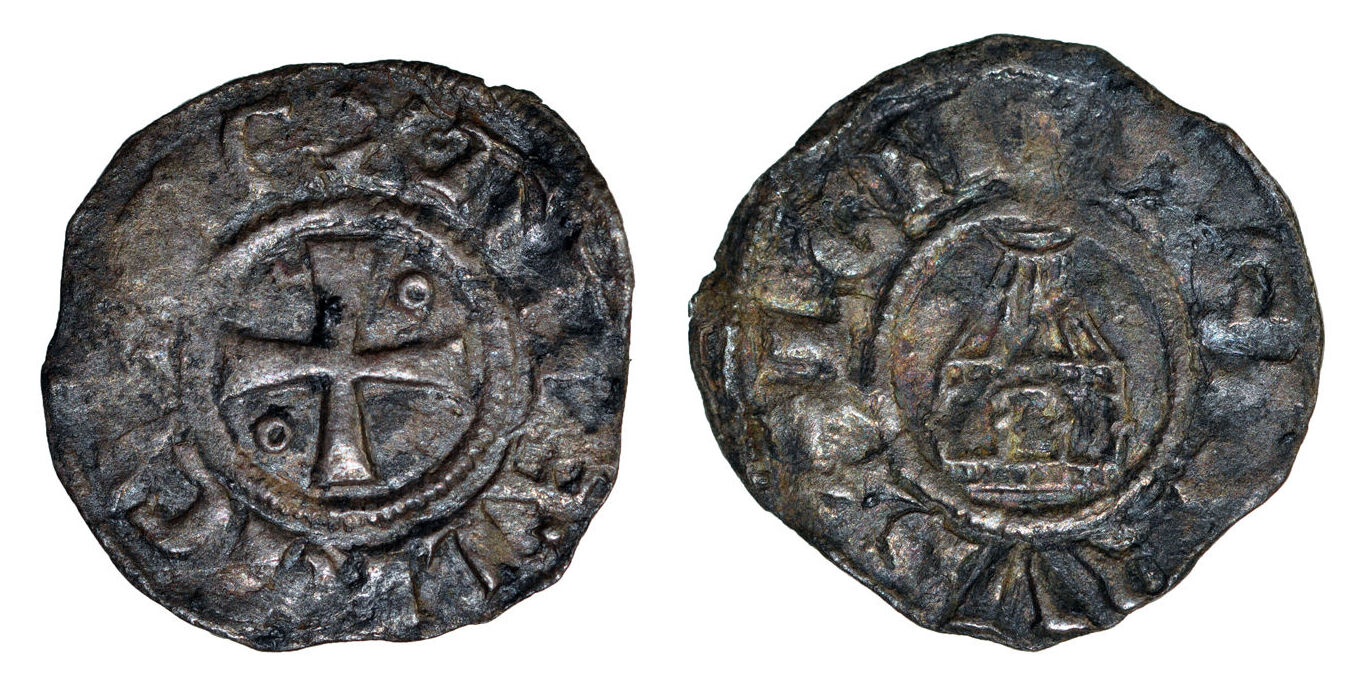
Amalric's coins depicted the Holy Sepulchre.

On 29 June 1170, a devastating earthquake hit the Levant, affecting Christians and Muslims alike. Amalric and Nur ad-Din made a temporary peace to allow their lands to recover; yet both were wary that the other would attack while the damage was being repaired. Amalric informed Louis VII of France and expressed concern that the enemy would seize Tripoli, Arqa, Gibelet, Latakia, Marqab, and Antioch. As administrator of the County of Tripoli, Amalric granted Arqa and Gibelacar to the Hospitallers to hold independently of the count on the condition that they repair the castles.

In December 1170, Saladin suddenly brought a vast host to besiege Darum, a simple fortress built by Amalric in the south of the kingdom for collecting taxes and tolls. Barber proposes that Saladin was emboldened by Amalric's preoccupation with the damage suffered by the County of Tripoli. Amalric was shocked by the size of Saladin's force, but Saladin left Darum half-destroyed without giving a major battle. Amalric rebuilt the fortress to be stronger. Later that month the Franks were unable to prevent Saladin from plundering Ailah. For the first time in half a century the kingdom was seriously threatened from Egypt.

==== Visit to Constantinople ====
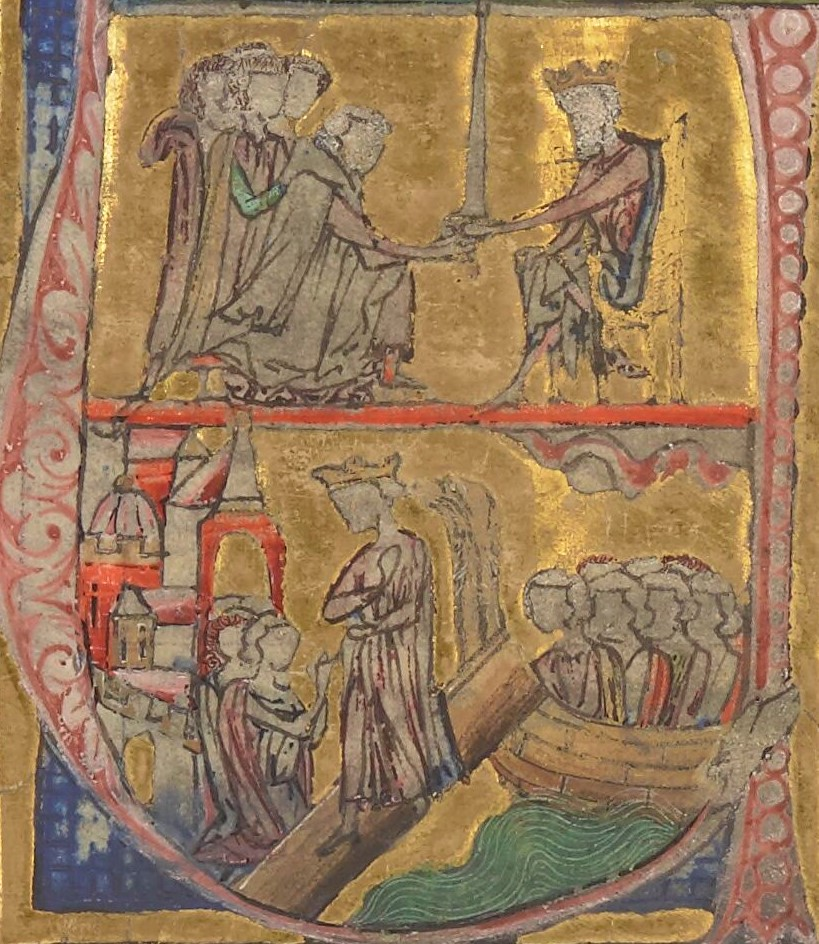
Amalric desired Byzantine help in defeating Shirkuh (up) and was lavishly welcomed in Constantinople (down).

In early 1171, Amalric held a general council to discuss the state of the kingdom and its future military policy. It was agreed that embassies and letters seeking help should be sent to all major Latin rulers and to Emperor Manuel. The king shocked the attending barons by suggesting that he himself should visit Manuel. No king of Jerusalem had ever traveled to Constantinople, and Barber believes that the idea betrayed a lack of confidence in western help. Amalric set out on 10 March, having sent Philip of Milly ahead. Philip had resigned as master of the Templars for this purpose, and the butler, Odo of Saint Amand, succeeded him. Amalric traveled with a large party, including the bishop of Acre, William, and the marshal, Gerard of Pugi. The king set sail from Tripoli. He was met at Gallipoli by his father-in-law, John Doukas Komnenos, who was a nephew of the emperor, and taken to Heraclea. There he embarked again in order to enter the Great Palace of Constantinople through the Boukoleon gate, which was an honor reserved for rulers.

Manuel arranged a lavish welcome for the royal party: Amalric was seated on a throne next to the emperor's, albeit slightly lower; given access to private imperial suites; shown the most precious relics; treated to music and theater shows; given a guided tour of the city; and taken by ship to view the mouth of the Black Sea. Manuel took a liking to Amalric and the imperial family, especially Amalric's father-in-law, were eager to show hospitality. Conferences were held daily, but the topics and eventual agreement went unrecorded. The Franks apparently convinced the emperor that they should once again join forces to conquer Egypt. Kinnamos writes that, in return, Amalric had to accept "his subjection" to the empire. The historian Marshall Baldwin is not certain that Amalric regarded himself as a vassal of Manuel. The king returned on 15 June, landing at Sidon.

Amalric had to deal with new Muslim attacks immediately upon his return from Constantinople. He assembled a force at the Springs of Saffuriya to respond to Nur ad-Din's attack in the north while simultaneously Saladin attacked Montreal in the south. Ibn al-Athir relates that Saladin came close to capturing Montreal, but was advised that Nur ad-Din might turn his attention to him if he defeated Amalric at the same time. In 1172, the king travelled north once again to prevent Cilicia from falling into the hands of the Armenian lord Mleh, who had expelled the Templars from their Cilician fortresses and allied with Nur ad-Din. Amalric obtained Mleh's submission, but had to return south when Nur ad-Din launched another diversion by attacking Kerak.

==== Unmaterialized alliances ====
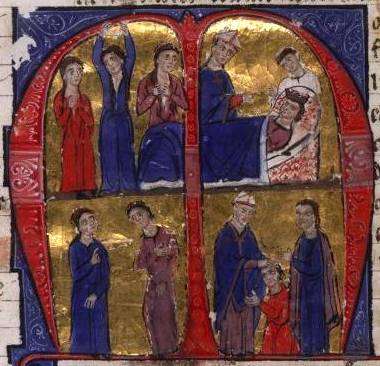
Amalric's sole son, Baldwin IV, was crowned after Amalric's death despite concerns about his health.

In 1173, Amalric attempted to ally with the Order of Assassins. According to the agreement reached between the king and the order's leader, Rashid al-Din Sinan, the king would cancel the tribute which the order paid to the Templars and the Assassins would in turn convert from Shi'ite Islam to Christianity. The order's envoy was returning from the negotiations with the king's guarantee of safe conduct when he was killed by a group of Templars led by Walter of Mesnil. Amalric's rage increased when the Templar's master, Odo of Saint Armand, refused to hand over Walter. Odo said that he had given a penance to Walter, who was held in Sidon, and that he would be sent to the pope. Amalric went to Sidon, however, took Walter, and imprisoned him in Tyre, intending to discuss the matter with other rulers. William of Tyre and Walter Map, the sources who recorded the murder, both lament the loss of this opportunity. Map writes that the Templars feared that conversions of Muslims to Christianity would make the Templars redundant.

With the help of Amalric, who helped raise the ransom, Raymond III of Tripoli was released from Nur ad-Din's prison in late 1173 or early 1174. Amalric welcomed Raymond and handed the government of Tripoli back to him. In 1174, King Amalric agreed on a joint attack on Egypt with King William II of Sicily. Nur ad-Din died on 15 May. Amalric tried to take advantage. He attacked Banias, but could not capture it and accepted money to retreat. On his way back he complained that he felt unwell. When he arrived in Tiberias it was clear that he had contracted dysentery. He reached Jerusalem, where he was treated by Greek, Syrian, and Frankish physicians, but they failed to save him. He died on 11 July. After some deliberation the High Court accepted Amalric's sickly son, Baldwin IV, as the new king.

== Assessment ==
William of Tyre, whom Amalric tasked with recording the history of the Kingdom of Jerusalem, left a detailed description of the king. Amalric was light-skinned with blond receding hair and, although he did not eat or drink excessively, considerably overweight. He shook with laughter when he was amused, but this was rare; whereas Baldwin was affable, Amalric was serious and taciturn. He was intellectually gifted but less refined than Baldwin, preferring a hunt to poetry. He enjoyed reading and debates with scholars, and was well-informed about the issues facing the crusader states. In battle he was daring, and in command composed and decisive. He regularly attended Mass, but William noted that not even the Church was spared from the king's "lust for money"; and he was promiscuous, pursuing even married women. The pro-Zengid chronicler Ibn al-Athir describes Amalric as "the bravest of their kings, the most outstanding for policy, cunning and intrigue".

Baldwin believes that the union of Egypt and Syria under Saladin might have been prevented if Amalric had not acted without his Byzantine allies in 1168. In the opinion of Baldwin, the failed attempt of the alliance to subjugate Egypt in 1169 marked a "turning point in Levantine history". Nevertheless, he considers Amalric "one of the best kings of Jerusalem, the last man of genuine capacity to hold the reins of government".

== Sources ==
- Baldwin, Marshall (1969). "The Latin States under Baldwin III and Amalric I, 1143-1174". In Setton, Kenneth; Baldwin, Marshall (eds.). A History of the Crusades. University of Wisconsin Press. ISBN 978-0-299-04834-1.
- Barber, Malcolm (2012). The Crusader States. Yale University Press. ISBN 978-0300189315.
- Hamilton, Bernard (2000). The Leper King and His Heirs: Baldwin IV and the Crusader Kingdom of Jerusalem. Cambridge University Press. ISBN 9780521017473.
- Mayer, Hans E. (1972). "Studies in the History of Queen Melisende of Jerusalem". Dumbarton Oaks Papers. 26. Dumbarton Oaks: 93–182. doi:10.2307/1291317. JSTOR 1291317.
- Richard, Jean (1979). The Latin Kingdom of Jerusalem. Europe in the Middle Ages: selected studies. Vol. 11A. Translated by Janet Shirley. North-Holland Publishing Company. ISBN 978-0-444-85092-8.
- Runciman, Steven (1952). A History of the Crusades, Volume II: The Kingdom of Jerusalem and the Frankish East. Cambridge: Cambridge University Press.

Regnal titles
Preceded by Baldwin III	King of Jerusalem; 1162–1174	Succeeded by Baldwin IV
Vacant In royal domain since 1134 Title last held by Hugh II	Count of Jaffa; 1151–1162	Vacant In royal domain until 1176 Title next held by Sibylla and William
New title	Count of Ascalon; 1153–1162	Vacant In royal domain until 1176 Title next held by Sibylla and William
