= Ernesius =

Archbishop of Caesarea in Jerusalem from 1158 to 1175

Ernesius (or Hernes) was the archbishop of Caesarea in the Kingdom of Jerusalem from 1158 until his death in 1175.

== Early career ==
Ernesius was the nephew of William of Malines, who came from Flanders and was appointed Latin patriarch of Jerusalem by King Baldwin II. Ernesius became chancellor to his uncle, a rare example of nepotism among the clergy of the Kingdom of Jerusalem. Patriarch William died in 1145, and Ernesius continued as chancellor under the next patriarch, Fulcher of Angoulême. As Fulcher's chancellor, Ernesius supported Queen Melisende in her struggle against King Baldwin III. Ernesius had originally opposed the appointment of Amalric of Nesle to the patriarchate (in 1157 or 1158), but he eventually began cooperating with him.

== Archiepiscopacy ==
Ernesius was appointed archbishop of Caesarea in 1158 in succession to Archbishop Baldwin II. He was described by Archbishop William of Tyre as "wise and endowed with eloquence." In 1160, while Melisende was fatally ill, Ernesius and several others were readmitted to the royal court.

King Amalric charged Ernesius and the royal butler, Odo of Saint-Amand, with negotiating a marriage for the king with a relative of the Byzantine Emperor Manuel I Komnenos. The embassy thus departed for the Byzantine court in Constantinople in 1165. Ernesius and Odo returned nearly two years later with a bride, the emperor's grandniece Maria Komnene.

In 1169 an embassy consisting of Patriarch Amalric, Archbishop Ernesius, and Bishop William of Acre was tasked with carrying letters from King Amalric to Emperor Frederick Barbarossa, Kings Louis VII of France and Henry II of England, Queen Margaret of Sicily, and Counts Philip I of Flanders, Theobald V of Blois, and Henry I of Champagne. The prelates were driven back to Acre by a severe storm after two days at sea; due to the risk, they refused to set sail again. The second attempt was instead entrusted to the archbishop of Tyre, Frederick of la Roche, and the bishop of Banyas, John.

Ernesius died in 1175 and was succeeded as archbishop by Heraclius.

== Bibliography ==
- Barber, Malcolm (2012). The Crusader States. Yale University Press. ISBN 978-0300189315.
- Edbury, P.W.; Rowe, J.G. (1990). William of Tyre: Historian of the Latin East. Cambridge Studies in Medieval Life and Thought: Fourth Series. Cambridge University Press. ISBN 978-0-521-40728-1.
- Hamilton, Bernard (1980). The Latin Church in the Crusader States: The Secular Church. Variorum Publications. ISBN 978-1-351-88705-2.
- Hamilton, Bernard (2000). The Leper King and His Heirs: Baldwin IV and the Crusader Kingdom of Jerusalem. Cambridge University Press. ISBN 9780521017473.
- Kool, Robert (2007). "A Deposit of Twelfth-century Medieval Seals at Caesarea: Evidence of the Cathedral Archive of St. Peter". In Shagrir, I.; Ellenblum, R.; Riley-Smith, J.S.C.; Ḳedar, B.Z. (eds.). In Laudem Hierosolymitani. Crusades--Subsidia 1 (in German). Ashgate. ISBN 978-0-7546-6140-5.
- Mayer, Hans E. (1972). "Studies in the History of Queen Melisende of Jerusalem". Dumbarton Oaks Papers. 26. Dumbarton Oaks: 93–182. doi:10.2307/1291317. JSTOR 1291317.
- Runciman, Steven (1952). A History of the Crusades: The Kingdom of Jerusalem and the Frankish East, 1100–1187. Vol. 2. Cambridge University Press. ISBN 0241298768.

Catholic Church titles
Preceded by Baldwin II	Archbishop of Caesarea; 1158-1175	Succeeded by Heraclius
