= Heraclius of Jerusalem =

Roman Catholic archbishop

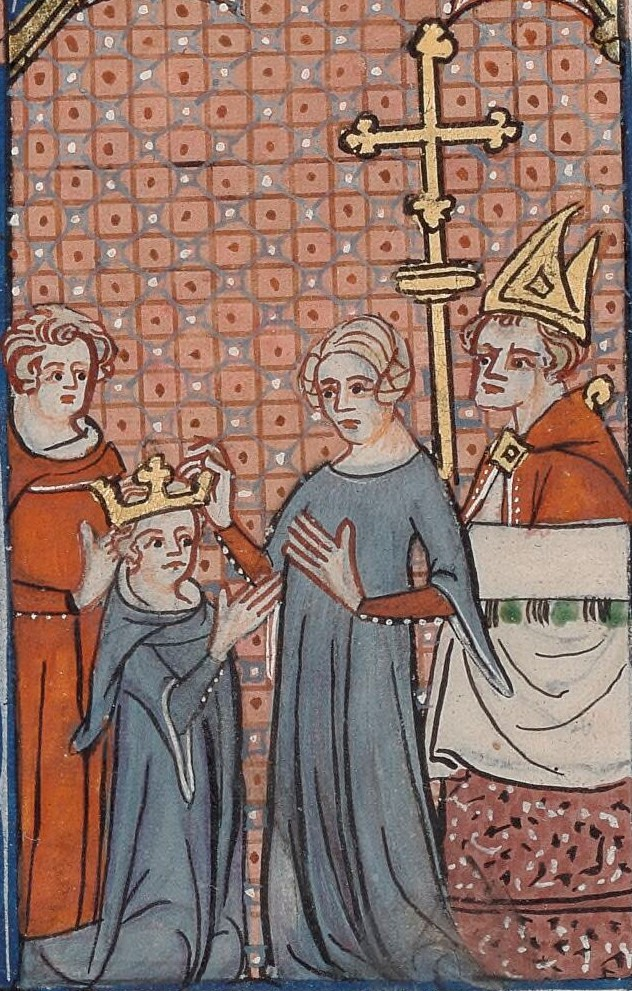
Heraclius (right) at Sibylla and Guy's coronation

Heraclius, or Eraclius (c. 1128 – 1190/91), was archbishop of Caesarea and Latin Patriarch of Jerusalem.

== Jerusalem and embassy ==
Heraclius returned to Jerusalem late in 1185. Baldwin IV had meanwhile died and had been succeeded as King by his young nephew, Baldwin V. The boy king died in summer 1186. The heir was his mother Sibylla, but her husband, Guy of Lusignan, a relative newcomer to the kingdom, was widely disliked by the nobility. It was agreed that Sibylla would be crowned only after she had divorced Guy; in return she insisted on choosing her new husband for herself, with the understanding that the husband she chose would become king. Heraclius crowned her. To the astonishment of the assembled nobility she took the crown and placed it on Guy's head, with the words (as given by Roger of Howden), "I choose you as king, and my lord, and lord of the land of Jerusalem, because those whom God has joined no man must separate."

King Henry II of England promised to participate in a crusade in 1172 and 1188, but his lateness and failure to do this was criticised by Heraclius. Heraclius travelled and met with Henry in Reading, Berkshire on 29 January 1185. He sought help, but Henry only promised financial aid. Heraclius was unable to obtain military support for the crusader states during his embassy of western Europe from 1184 to 1185. Henry joined the Third Crusade, but died in 1189.

The Temple Church, which had been in use for twenty years, was consecrated by Heraclius on 2 or 10 February 1185. The Clerkenwell Priory in Clerkenwell was consecrated by Heraclius on 6 March.

== Defense of Jerusalem ==
Saladin's secretary Imad al-Din al-Isfahani claimed that Heraclius stripped the gold reliquaries from the churches on the Temple Mount, and carried away cartloads of treasure with him.

== Works cited ==
- Griffith-Jones, Robin; Fernie, Eric, eds. (2018). Tomb and Temple: Re-imagining the Sacred Buildings of Jerusalem. Boydell & Brewer. ISBN 9781783272808.
- Paul, Nicholas (2012). To Follow in Their Footsteps: The Crusades and Family Memory in the High Middle Ages. Cornell University Press. ISBN 9780801450976.
- Spacey, Beth (2020). The Miraculous and the Writing of Crusade Narrative. Boydell & Brewer. ISBN 9781783275182.
- Tyerman, Christopher (2019). The World of the Crusades. Yale University Press. ISBN 9780300217391.

== Sources ==
- Peter W. Edbury, "Propaganda and Faction in the Kingdom of Jerusalem: The Background to Hattin", in Crusaders and Muslims in Twelfth-Century Syria, ed. Maya Shatzmiller, 1993.
- Peter W. Edbury, The Conquest of Jerusalem and the Third Crusade: Sources in Translation. Ashgate, 1996. [Includes Eraclius's letter to Urban III after the battle of Hattin (pp. 162–3: see also p. 47).]
- Bernard Hamilton, The Leper King & His Heirs, 2000
- Benjamin Z. Kedar, "The Patriarch Eraclius", in Outremer: Studies in the History of the Crusading Kingdom of Jerusalem presented to Joshua Prawer, ed. B. Z. Kedar, H. E. Mayer, and R. C. Smail, 1982.

Catholic Church titles
Preceded by Ernesius	Archbishop of Caesarea; 1175–1180	Succeeded by Aymar the Monk
Preceded by Amalric of Nesle	Patriarch of Jerusalem; 1180–1190/1191	Succeeded by Aymar the Monk
