= Joscius (archbishop of Tyre) =

Jerusalemite archbishop (died 1202)

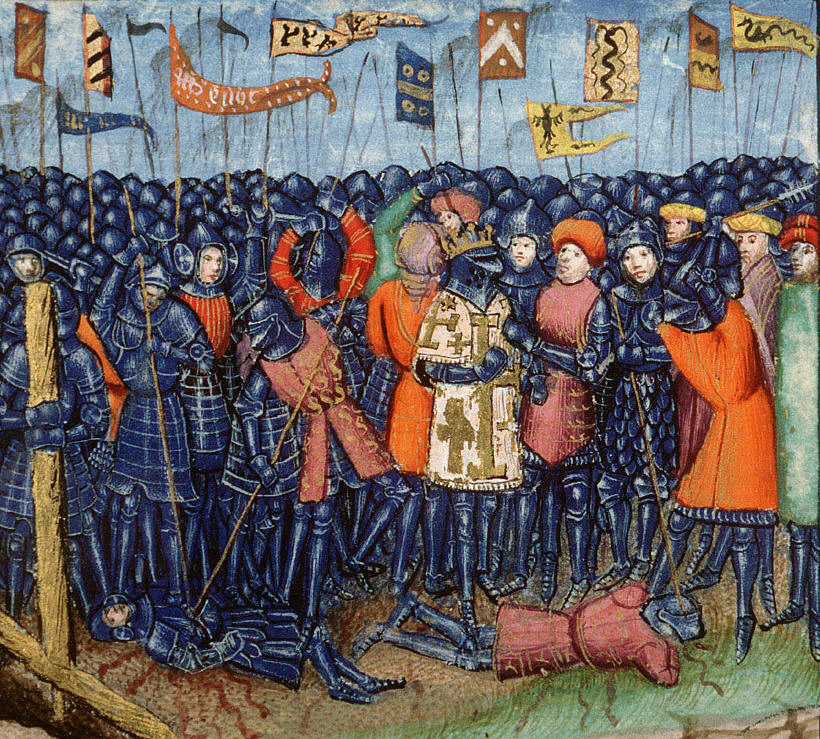
Battle of Hattin

Joscius (also Josce or Josias) (died 1202) was archbishop of Tyre in the crusader Kingdom of Jerusalem in the late 12th century.

== Background ==
He was a canon and subdeacon of the church of Acre, and became bishop of Acre on November 23, 1172. He was a member of the delegation from the Latin church of the crusader states at the Third Lateran Council in 1179. While in Europe he also visited France on behalf of King Baldwin IV, to negotiate a marriage between Duke Hugh III of Burgundy and Baldwin's sister Sibylla, but the marriage never took place; Sibylla instead married Guy of Lusignan the next year.

Joscius succeeded William of Tyre as archbishop of Tyre sometime before October 21, 1186, when he is first attested in that position. Meanwhile, Sibylla and Guy had become queen and king of Jerusalem against the ambitions of Count Raymond III of Tripoli, who hoped to install Sibylla's half-sister Isabella on the throne. In Tripoli, Raymond allied with the Muslim sultan Saladin against Guy. In April 1187, Guy, hoping to establish a truce, sent an embassy to Raymond, led by Balian of Ibelin, Gerard de Ridefort, Roger de Moulins, Reginald of Sidon, and Joscius. The embassy was attacked by a portion of Saladin's army, which had entered the Kingdom at Raymond III's fief of Tiberias, and was defeated at the Battle of Cresson on May 1. Balian and Reginald had stopped at their own castles on the way, but Joscius was present at the battle.

Joscius and Balian continued on to Tiberias where they met Raymond, who was soon reconciled with Guy in the face of this defeat. Saladin's invasion of the Kingdom resulted in the Battle of Hattin on July 4, at which the entire army of the Kingdom was destroyed; the survivors fled to Tyre, where Conrad of Montferrat soon took control of the defences of the city, after arriving later that month.

== After Jerusalem ==
After the fall of Jerusalem to Saladin in September, Conrad sent Joscius of Tyre to the West in a black-sailed ship, bearing appeals for aid, including propaganda drawings of the horses of Saladin's army stabled (and urinating) in the Church of the Holy Sepulchre. Joscius arrived first in Sicily, where King William II promised to send a Sicilian fleet to the east; he himself died before he could go on crusade but his fleet helped save Tripoli from Saladin's attacks. Joscius continued on to Rome, where news of Hattin supposedly caused Pope Urban III to die of shock. His successor Gregory VIII issued the bull Audita tremendi, calling for a new crusade and directed to the major European monarchs. Joscius then went to France, where news of Hattin had already arrived and Richard the Lionheart had already vowed to go on crusade. In January 1188 Joscius met with Kings Henry II of England and Philip II of France and Count Philip I of Flanders at Gisors. He mediated a peace between Henry and Philip II and convinced them to take the cross as well. In England, Henry promulgated the Saladin tithe to pay for the crusade; this was perhaps influenced by the 1183 tax in Jerusalem, which Joscius may have mentioned to him at Gisors. Some later English chroniclers, including Matthew Paris, claim that the archbishop present at Gisors was William, but this is an error.

== After Third Crusade ==
After the Third Crusade, Joscius became chancellor of Jerusalem for Henry II of Champagne, who had married Queen Isabella I of Jerusalem after Conrad's murder, but had not taken the title of king. Henry was involved in a dispute with the Canons of the Church of the Holy Sepulchre over the election of a new Latin patriarch of Jerusalem, and had them arrested until Joscius intervened. Joscius was also present at the foundation of the Teutonic Knights in 1198, and probably died in 1202.

== Sources ==
- William of Tyre, A History of Deeds Done Beyond the Sea, trans. E.A. Babcock and A.C. Krey. Columbia University Press, 1943.
- Steven Runciman, A History of the Crusades, vols. II-III. Cambridge University Press, 1952-54.
- Bernard Hamilton, The Leper King and his Heirs, Cambridge University Press, 2000.
- Peter W. Edbury, The Conquest of Jerusalem and the Third Crusade: Sources in Translation. Ashgate, 1996.

Catholic Church titles
Preceded by William	Bishop of Acre; 1172-1186	Succeeded by Rufinus
Preceded by William of Tyre	Archbishop of Tyre; 1186–1202	Succeeded by Clarembaud of Broies
