= Adam of Acre =

Bishop of Banias, 1140–1160

Adam of Acre was the bishop of Banias from 1140 until 1160.

Adam was originally the archdeacon of the Diocese of Acre. Acre was one of the largest cities in the Kingdom of Jerusalem, and historian Bernard Hamilton presumes that Adam was experienced in church administration. A career in church administration was regarded as particularly significant for clerics who aspired to be appointed to bishoprics. Thus, when King Fulk captured Banias in 1140, the same year Adam was consecrated as the first Latin bishop of Banias. He is the only archdeacon of a lesser episcopal see from the crusader states who became a bishop.

With other bishops and archbishops of the kingdom, Adam took part in a synod convoked in 1156 at the Church of the Holy Sepulchre by the Latin patriarch of Jerusalem, Fulcher of Angoulême. Fulcher was incensed by the apparent insubordination of the Prior and the canons the Mount of Olives, and the synod found against them. They were sentenced to walk barefoot from the Mount of Olives to the Church of the Holy Sepulchre as penance. Bishop Adam, Bishop Mainard of Beirut, and the archbishop of Tyre, Peter of Barcelona, considered this excessive. Peter convinced Adam and Mainard, who were his suffragans, to walk barefoot with him through the city of Jerusalem in a show of solidarity with the prior and the canons.

Adam's power decreased when, in 1157, the lord of Banias, Humphrey II of Toron, granted half of Banias to the Order of the Hospital. A new bishop of Banias, John, was appointed to succeed Adam in 1161.

== Bibliography ==
- Hamilton, Bernard (1980). The Latin Church in the Crusader States: The Secular Church. Variorum Publications. ISBN 978-1-351-88705-2.
- Hamilton, Bernard; Jotischky, Andrew (2020). "The Austin Canons". In Derek Baker (ed.). Latin and Greek Monasticism in the Crusader States. Cambridge University Press. ISBN 978-0521836388.

Catholic Church titles
| Vacant Muslim rule | Bishop of Banias; 1140-1160 | Succeeded by John |
