= Amalric of Nesle =

Latin patriarch of Jerusalem (died 1180)

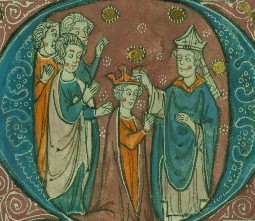
Patriarch Amalric crowns King Baldwin IV, as depicted in late 13th-century edition of the Histoire d'Outre Mer

Amalric of Nesle (French: Amaury; died on 6 October 1180) was a Catholic prelate who served as the Latin patriarch of Jerusalem from late 1157 or early 1158 until his death. Amalric focused chiefly on managing church property; he showed very little political initiative and, unlike many contemporary bishops in the crusader states, had no interest in military affairs.

Amalric was born in France. He arrived in the Latin East in the 1130s or early 1140s and became the court chaplain of Queen Melisende. He rose to become prior of the Holy Sepulchre in 1151 probably because of the queen's patronage. In 1157 she selected him to become the next patriarch and, despite some clerical opposition, he was enthroned by early 1158. Melisende's sons, King Baldwin III and King Amalric, paid little attention to him. Amalric of Nesle was instrumental in forcing King Amalric to separate from his wife, Agnes of Courtenay, at the insistence of the High Court. For this reason King Amalric practically excluded him from government, but they worked together on establishing new bishoprics in the kingdom.

King Amalric died in 1174, and the patriarch had no part in the election of his son, Baldwin IV, as the next king. Baldwin IV's mother, Agnes, gained immense influence, and Amalric remained out of favor at court. From 1177 the kingdom was increasingly threatened by the Ayyubid ruler Saladin. Amalric was annoyed when the king allowed the Greek Orthodox patriarch of Jerusalem, Leontius, to enter the kingdom as the representative of Emperor Manuel I Komnenos, whose aid the king hoped to secure; Manuel recalled Leontius in order to maintain good relations with Amalric and the papacy. Amalric was too old to travel to Rome to seek Western military aid at the Third Lateran Council in 1179. He died the following year.

== Rise ==
Amalric was born in Nesle near Paris. He arrived in the Kingdom of Jerusalem during the reign of King Fulk (1131–1143) and became the court chaplain of Queen Melisende. The kingdom and the other crusader states were ruled by Franks, French-speaking Catholics, but were surrounded by Arab Muslim states.

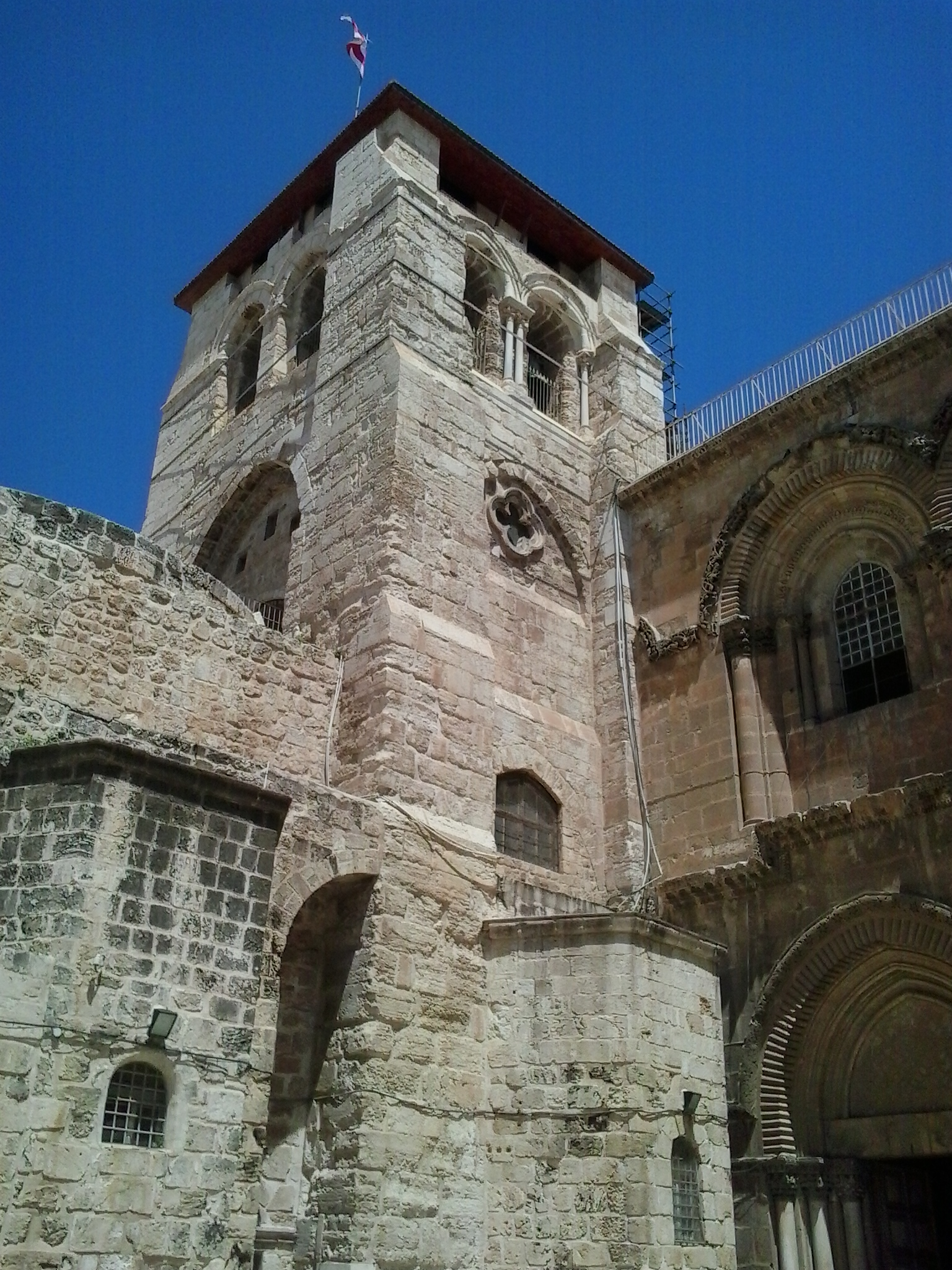
12th-century bell tower of the Holy Sepulchre

Amalric became prior of the Church of the Holy Sepulchre by 1151, succeeding Peter of Barcelona, who had become archbishop of Tyre. He was the first prior not to come from the Holy Sepulcher's cathedral chapter. Historian Bernard Hamilton considers it likely that his appointment was arranged by Queen Melisende, who was then reigning with her son King Baldwin III. At the peak of the church hierarchy in the Kingdom of Jerusalem was the patriarch, who had a key role in the selection of the king because he was entitled to perform the coronation. Until 1099, when the Franks captured the city of Jerusalem in the First Crusade, the resident patriarch was Greek Orthodox rather than Catholic (Latin). The Byzantine emperors continued to appoint Greek Orthodox patriarchs of Jerusalem, but they lived in Constantinople and the Franks recognized only the Latin patriarch. The Latin patriarch therefore effectively had authority over both Catholic and Orthodox Christians.

When Patriarch Fulcher died in November 1157, three women of the royal family–Queen Melisende, her stepdaughter Countess Sibylla of Flanders, and the queen's sister Countess Hodierna of Tripoli–chose Amalric to become the next patriarch. King Baldwin appears to have played no role in Amalric's selection. Amalric was enthroned in late 1157 or early 1158. For unknown reasons, his accession to the patriarchate was opposed by the archbishop of Caesarea, Ernesius, and the bishop of Bethlehem, Ralph the Englishman. They complained to Pope Hadrian IV, and Amalric sent the bishop of Acre, Frederick of la Roche, to Rome to secure the pope's support. Hadrian confirmed Amalric's election and sent him a pallium.

== Patriarchate ==
=== Papal and royal controversies ===
In 1159, two rival candidates were elected to become pope: Alexander III and Victor IV. King Baldwin III, the leading barons, the patriarch, and the bishops held a council in Nazareth to deliberate on the matter. The bishops could not agree on which of the two they should recognize as pope. Baldwin was eager to avoid a schism in his kingdom and persuaded the council to remain neutral. Hamilton believes that Amalric's predecessor, Fulcher, would have never allowed the king to make such a decision for him, and concludes that Amalric "does not seem to have had a very forceful personality". Later that year the clergy agreed to recognize Alexander as pope.

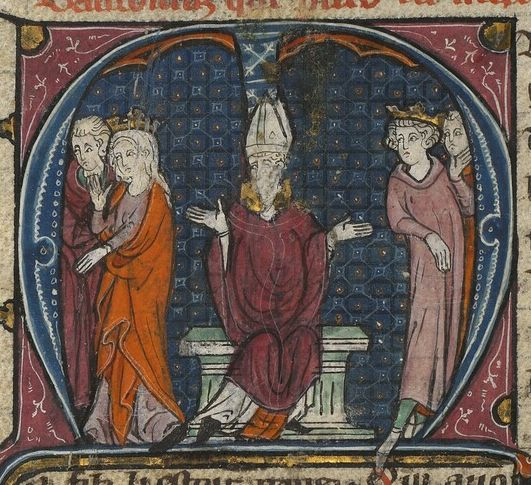
A late 13th-century depiction of the annulment of King Amalric's marriage

King Baldwin III died childless on 10 February 1163. The High Court, with Patriarch Amalric as the spokesman, refused to recognize Baldwin's brother, Amalric, as king unless he repudiated his wife, Agnes of Courtenay. Baldwin's brother had married Agnes in 1157 despite the objections of Patriarch Fulcher, who had declared that, as third cousins, they were too closely related. The demand was accepted. Patriarch Amalric promptly annulled the marriage on the grounds of consanguinity and crowned his namesake on 18 February. Hamilton believes that the official reason for the annulment "masked some more deep-seated animosity" of the lords towards Agnes. He argues the new king must have held the patriarch at least partly responsible for this humiliating condition because, even if he were just a mouthpiece for the barons, the patriarch had the final say in the matter according to canon law. On 29 August 1167 the patriarch celebrated the king's marriage to Maria, a grandniece of Byzantine Emperor Manuel I Komnenos, at the Cathedral of Tyre.

=== Ecclesiastical policy ===
Patriarch Amalric suffered no retaliation from his namesake the king but found himself mostly ignored through most of his pontificate. The only monarch to invite him to witness a royal charter was Queen Melisende, who had appointed him. Amalric spent most of his tenure as patriarch conveyancing church property and settling related lawsuits. Clergy in the crusader states frequently took part in warfare, but Amalric never did in so during his 23-year-long pontificate. Hamilton concludes that the patriarch was not interested in military affairs: though the kingdom was almost constantly at war while he was patriarch, Amalric never accompanied the royal army as the bearer of the True Cross. After the Christian defeat at the battle of Harim in 1164, Amalric wrote an encyclical offering indulgences to those who would come to help the Catholics in the Levant; this remained his only contribution to the kingdom's political life.

In 1169 Patriarch Amalric offered to go to Europe to personally help recruit aid. He, Archbishop Ernesius of Caesarea, and Bishop William of Acre carried letters to Emperor Frederick Barbarossa, Kings Louis VII of France and Henry II of England, Queen Margaret of Sicily, and Counts Philip I of Flanders, Theobald V of Blois, and Henry I of Champagne. Two days after the prelates set out, however, their ships ran into a severe storm that drove them back to Acre. Though he escaped unharmed, Amalric was replaced as the head of the embassy by Frederick of la Roche, now the archbishop of Tyre.

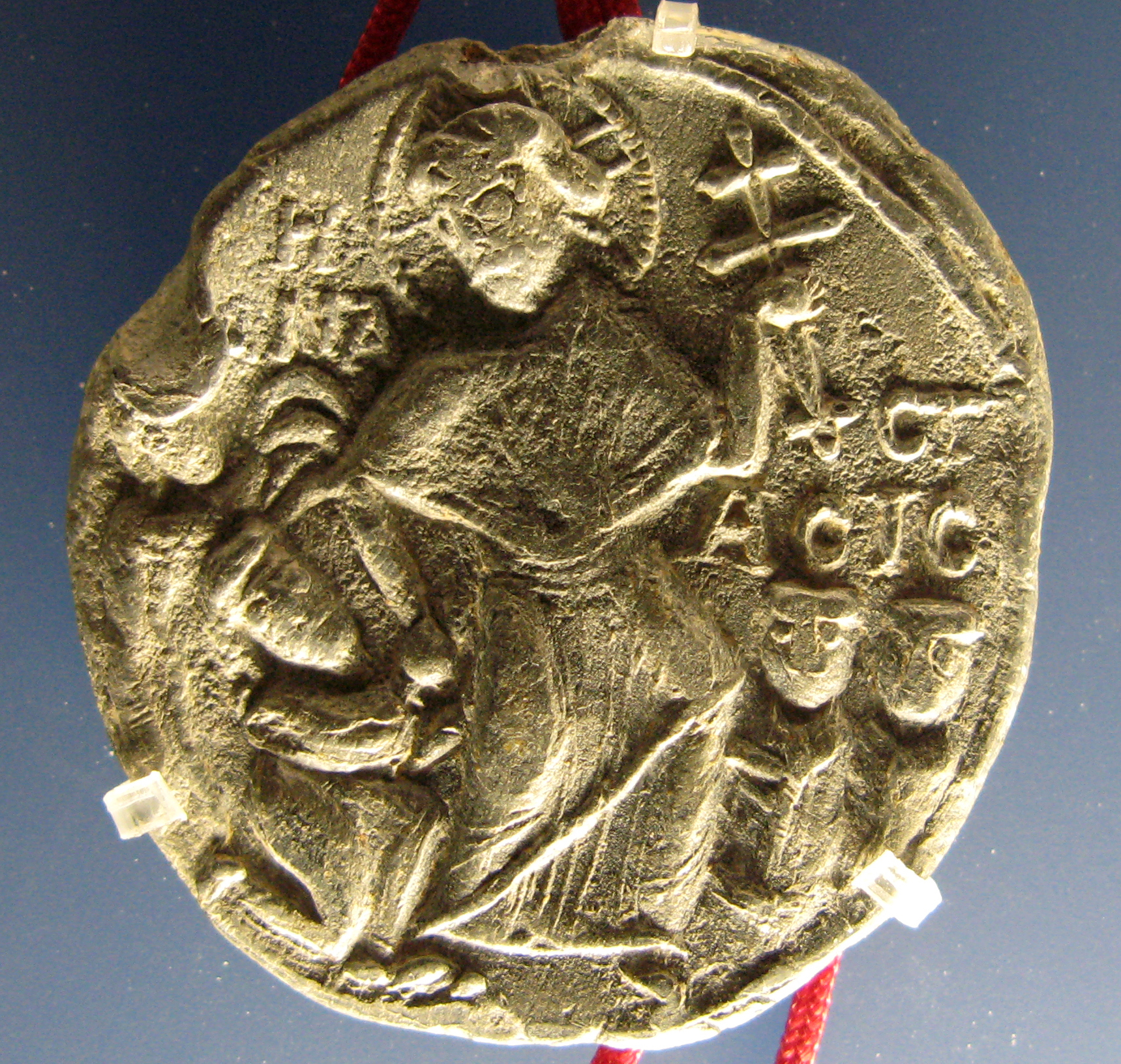
Seal of Patriarch Amalric

The king and the patriarch worked together cordially on the ecclesiastical organization of the kingdom, setting up the new bishoprics of Petra and Hebron in 1168. They proposed the restoration of a bishop to the former Orthodox see of Jaffa, controlled by the canons of the Holy Sepulchre. The canons complained to the papacy that the restoration of a bishop in Jaffa would cause them financial hardship. Pope Alexander upheld the patriarch's right to restore the see but made it a condition that the canons should be compensated. The plan was then set aside.

Hamilton believes that, despite his cooperation, the establishment of the new bishoprics was not to the patriarch's liking because it meant the transfer of revenue from him to the new bishops. Amalric received a confirmation from the pope that the other Orthodox sees without bishops, namely Jericho, Nablus, and Darum, would remain under the control of the patriarchate. Amalric tried to offset his losses by usurping some of the revenues of the Holy Sepulchre, causing the pope to reprimand him after the canons complained. The abbot of Josaphat also lodged a complaint after the patriarch and the canons demanded board when they visited Josaphat, leading to a violent altercation with the Josaphat monks and even death. Alexander ruled in the abbot's favor.

=== Old age ===
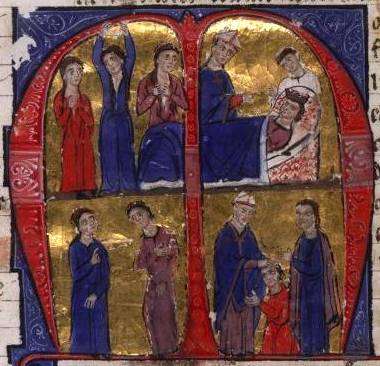
The death of King Amalric and the coronation of King Baldwin IV as depicted in a 13th-century manuscript

King Amalric died in 1174. Though he had left a young son, Baldwin IV, there was a debate about the succession because the boy had been exhibiting symptoms of leprosy. Unlike in 1163, Patriarch Amalric played no role in determining the new king. He had been excluded by King Amalric from any active role in the government, had grown old, and had never had the temperament. The High Court agreed that Baldwin IV was the best choice, and Amalric anointed him and crowned him in the Church of the Holy Sepulchre on 15 July. The new king's mother, Agnes of Courtenay, became very influential. This must have been to the patriarch's detriment, argues Hamilton, as she must have resented him for having prevented her from becoming queen. He remained out of favor at court and his place on public occasions was taken by Bishop Albert of Bethlehem.

The year 1177 saw the arrival of the Greek Orthodox patriarch of Jerusalem, Leontius, as the representative of the Byzantine emperor, Manuel I Komnenos. Theodosius Goudelis, an acquaintance and biographer of Leontius, wrote that Amalric attempted to have Leontius assassinated, which Hamilton considers improbable. Amalric was, however, hostile to Leontius; and while King Baldwin was anxious that Leontius be treated well in order to win Byzantine protection, Amalric only acquiesced to royal demands so far as to allow Leontius to celebrate the Divine Liturgy in the Church of the Holy Sepulchre in the presence only of the Orthodox canons. Manuel soon recalled Leontius to avoid a conflict with Amalric and Pope Alexander.

During Baldwin IV's reign the Ayyubid ruler Saladin united the Muslim-ruled lands of Egypt and Syria, encircling the Kingdom of Jerusalem. He invaded the kingdom in 1177, while the Frankish army was on campaign in northern Syria. The young king, though inexperienced and gravely ill, rode out to meet Saladin with the few knights who had remained in the kingdom. Patriarch Amalric was left in charge of Jerusalem, but the city was stripped of troops. The Franks, though severely outnumbered, decisively defeated Saladin at the battle of Montgisard. The ailing king's sister and heir presumptive, Sibylla, unexpectedly married Guy of Lusignan, a knight from Poitou, in early 1178, and a dangerous rift appeared in the kingdom's nobility between those who supported Guy and those who opposed him.

The Third Lateran Council, the most important council of the Catholic Church in decades, was held in March 1179. Both Amalric and the Latin patriarch of Antioch, Aimery of Limoges, were too old to embark on a long sea voyage. The prior of the Holy Sepulchre, Peter, represented Amalric. The delegates from the crusader states included Archbishops William of Tyre and Heraclius of Caesarea; the bishops of Sebastea, Bethlehem, and Tripoli; and the abbot of Mount Zion. Their ranks were too low for their voices to be heard, and the interests of the crusader states went ignored. Hamilton believes that Western aid might have been secured if the two patriarchs had attended, as they would have taken precedence over all the prelates except the pope.

Amalric died on 6 October 1180. Ten days later, Agnes chose the archbishop of Caesarea, Heraclius, to succeed him, spurning William of Tyre. Heraclius was accused of many moral failings but took political initiative, which "must have been a welcome change" according to Hamilton.

== Assessment ==
William of Tyre was not fond of Amalric, though Amalric had consecrated him as archbishop. William described the patriarch as "reasonably well educated but bereft of intelligence and virtually useless". Hamilton sees some merit in William's judgement, arguing that Amalric left little impression on the politics of the kingdom and lacked the leadership qualities that the kingdom needed, especially after its society divided into factions upon King Amalric's death, but concedes that being out of favor at court because of annulling King Amalric's marriage to Agnes may not have entirely been the patriarch's fault. Hamilton notes that Amalric performed no acts of piety that might have made him a reputable religious leader, that the only alms he gave were for his own requiem, and that he instituted no special prayer for the kingdom in perilous moments such as Saladin's 1177 invasion. Hamilton concludes:

No other Latin patriarch had ruled for so long: no other had made so little contribution to the life of the kingdom and of the church.

Catholic Church titles
Preceded by Fulcher	Patriarch of Jerusalem; 1157/8–1180	Succeeded by Heraclius
