= Leontius II of Jerusalem =

Greek Orthodox patriarch of Jerusalem from 1170 to 1190

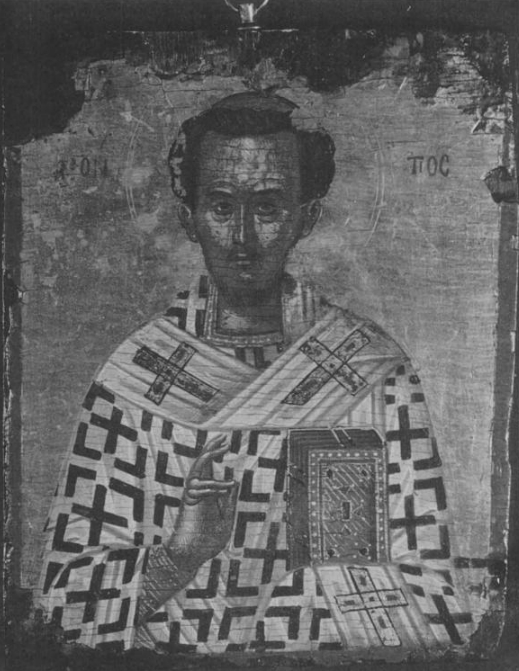
Leontius II of Jerusalem

Leontius II of Jerusalem was the Greek Orthodox patriarch of Jerusalem from 1170 to 1190. Little is known about his activities while he was patriarch.

Leontius was born in Tiberioupolis, on the Balkan frontier of the Byzantine Empire. He was tonsured a monk in Constantinople, where he lived until he traveled through Patmos, Cyprus, to Crete. He became the hegumen of the Monastery of Saint John the Theologian in Patmos.

He was elected patriarch in 1170, succeeding Nikephoros II. Patriarch Leontius reposed in 1190.

In 1177 Leontius was sent to the Kingdom of Jerusalem, as the representative of the Byzantine emperor Manuel I Komnenos to King Baldwin IV of Jerusalem. Theodosius Goudelis, an acquaintance and biographer of Leontius, wrote that the Latin patriarch of Jerusalem, Amalric of Nesle, attempted to have Leontius assassinated, which the modern historian Bernard Hamilton considers improbable. Amalric was, however, hostile to Leontius; and while King Baldwin was anxious that Leontius be treated well in order to win Byzantine protection, Amalric only acquiesced to royal demands so far as to allow Leontius to celebrate the Divine Liturgy in the Church of the Holy Sepulchre in the presence only of the Orthodox canons. The emperor soon recalled Leontius to avoid a conflict with Amalric and, through Amalric, with Pope Alexander III.

== Sources ==
- Leontius II, Greek-Orthodox patriarch of Jerusalem from 1170 to 1190 v ia Archive.org

This article incorporates text from Leontius II of Jerusalem at OrthodoxWiki which is licensed under the CC-BY-SA and GFDL.

- Hamilton, Bernard (2000). The Leper King and his Heirs: Baldwin IV and the Crusader Kingdom of Jerusalem. Cambridge University Press. ISBN 9780521641876.

Religious titles
Preceded by Nicephorus II	Patriarch of Jerusalem; 1170-1190	Succeeded by Dositheos I
