= Bernard Vacher =

12th-century knight in the Levant

Bernard Vacher (Latin: Bernardus Vaccarius) was a 12th-century knight active in the Levant as a familiaris of King Fulk of Jerusalem.

Bernard first appears in the historical records in 1122 as a witness to a charter of King Baldwin II issued in Antioch. His origins are not known. The historian Hans E. Mayer speculates that Bernard may have come from Flanders. In 1122-23 a certain Bernard Vacca is recorded as a judge and a witness in Arras at the court of Charles the Good, count of Flanders; because Bernard Vacher does not reappear in the Latin East until 1126, Mayer posits that they may be the same person. Mayer's colleague Alan V. Murray is doubtful because "there is a significant difference in meaning" between Vaccarius ("the cowherd") and Vacca ("cow"). Bernard's career under Baldwin II was a modest success; he was never made a lord nor did he contract an advantageous marriage. He did, however, hold feudal estates in the royal domain south of Nablus.

After Baldwin II's reign, Bernard passed into the service of King Fulk, under whom his influence reached its peak. Fulk appreciated Bernard's lack of connections to the established nobility of the kingdom, particularly during the revolt of their leader, Hugh II of Jaffa, in 1134. In 1134 Fulk sent Bernard, along with Patriarch William's chancellor, Baldwin, on an embassy to Italy. Bernard and Baldwin were to urge the feuding city-states of Genoa and Pisa to make peace and together help Jerusalem fend off its Muslim enemies. They were unsuccessful. In 1139 Bernard carried the royal banner and stood in for the king, who was campaigning east of the Jordan, in a small army assembled to deal with a Muslim invasion.

Bernard continued his service into King Baldwin III's reign. In early 1147 Queen Melisende sent him to treat with Mu'in ad-Din Unur, ruler of Damascus, ahead of a proposed attack on the Damascene territory of the Hauran. Unur convinced Bernard that this course would be foolish and wrong, and Bernard in turn persuaded the young king. The army had already been assembled, however, and agitators who hoped to loot denounced Bernard as a traitor. The king and the barons gave in. Unur struck an alliance with the powerful Aleppan ruler, Nur ad-Din, who forced the royal army to retreat from the Hauran, harassing the starving men on their way back and picking off stragglers. An Arabic-speaking messenger, whom the historian Steven Runciman identifies as Bernard, was sent to sue for peace, but was killed on his way.

== Bibliography ==
- Mayer, Hans Eberhard (1989). "Angevins versus Normans: The New Men of King Fulk of Jerusalem". Proceedings of the American Philosophical Society. 133 (1). American Philosophical Society: 1–25. ISSN 0003-049X. JSTOR 987158.
- Murray, Alan V. (2000). The Crusader Kingdom of Jerusalem: A Dynastic History 1099-1125. Occasional Publications UPR. ISBN 978-1-900934-03-9.
- Tessera, Miriam Rita (31 December 2010). "Orientalis Ecclesia: The Papal Schism of 1130 and the Latin Church of the Crusader States". Crusades. 9 (1). Informa UK Limited: 1–12. doi:10.1080/28327861.2010.12220242. ISSN 1476-5276.
- Runciman, Steven (1952). A History of the Crusades: The Kingdom of Jerusalem and the Frankish East, 1100–1187. Vol. 2. Cambridge University Press. ISBN 0241298768.
