= Baldwin II (archbishop of Caesarea) =

Archbishop of Caesarea

Baldwin II was a Latin churchman who served as the archbishop of Caesarea in the Latin East from 1141/42 to 1156/57.

Baldwin was a prominent in figure in the Kingdom of Jerusalem already in the reign of King Baldwin II. He served as chancellor of the Latin Patriarchate of Jerusalem under William of Messines, who was appointed patriarch in 1130, and remained in this office until at least 1141. In the early 1130s Baldwin and Bernard Vacher, a familiaris of King Fulk, were sent by the patriarch and the king as envoys to Italy. Their mission was to promote peace between the rival republics of Genoa and Pisa and convince them to join forces against the Muslims who were threatening the Latin East, but they were not successful.

Baldwin's career as chancellor of the patriarch made him a prime candidate for the episcopate. He was elected to the archbishopric of Caesarea in either 1141 or 1142; the earliest known document naming him archbishop dates from 1142. As is the case with his predecessor, Gaudens (likewise a former patriarchal chancellor), little is known about Baldwin's personality or achievements. He took part in the 1148 Council of Acre, attended by King Conrad III of Germany, and in the siege of Ascalon in 1153. In early 1155 Archbishop Baldwin travelled with fellow bishops to Rome to settle a dispute with the Order of the Hospital. He died in Palestine probably in early 1157 or possibly in 1156. He was succeeded by another patriarchal chancellor, Ernesius.

A lead seal bearing the inscription +baldvinus c[esariensi]sarchiepiscopus, attributed to Baldwin II, was discovered by a resident of Caesarea and described in 1980. On the obverse it depicts the archbishop with a mitre and a pallium, offering a benediction with his right hand and holding a crozier in his right; on the reverse, Saint Peter baptises Cornelius the Centurion. The only ecclesiastics who were accorded the privilege of using a lead seal were the archbishop of Nazareth and the bishop of Lydda.

== Bibliography ==
- Favreau-Lilie, Marie-Luise (1989). Die Italiener im Heiligen Land vom ersten Kreuzzug bis zum Tode Heinrichs von Champagne (1098-1197) (in German). Hakkert. ISBN 978-90-256-0953-5.
- Hamilton, Bernard (1980). The Latin Church in the Crusader States: The Secular Church. Variorum Publications. ISBN 978-1-351-88705-2.
- Hazard, Harry W. (1975). "Caesarea and the Crusades". Bulletin of the American Schools of Oriental Research. Supplementary Studies (19). The American Schools of Oriental Research: 79–114. ISSN 0145-3661. JSTOR 20066618.
- Spaer, Arnold (1980). "Archbishop Baldwin II of Caesarea". The Numismatic Chronicle. 20 (140). Royal Numismatic Society: 193–194. ISSN 0078-2696. JSTOR 42667089.
- Tessera, Miriam Rita (31 December 2010). "Orientalis Ecclesia: The Papal Schism of 1130 and the Latin Church of the Crusader States". Crusades. 9 (1). Informa UK Limited: 1–12. doi:10.1080/28327861.2010.12220242. ISSN 1476-5276.
