= Helladius of Ptolemais =

Christian bishop of Ptolemais

Helladius of Ptolemais (Greek: Έλλάδιος) was a Christian bishop of Ptolemais (now Acre, Israel). He was present at the First Council of Ephesus (431).
