= Frederick of La Roche =

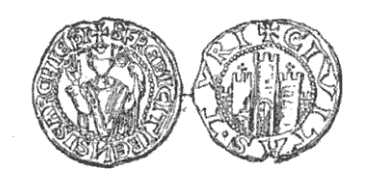
Frederick's seal, depicting him and the city of Tyre

Frederick of La Roche (died 30 October 1174) was the sixth Latin archbishop of Tyre (1164–1174), chancellor of the kingdom of Jerusalem (c. 1150), and the chief diplomat of King Amalric. He was a Lorrainer, from the family of the counts of La Roche.

== Bishop of Acre ==
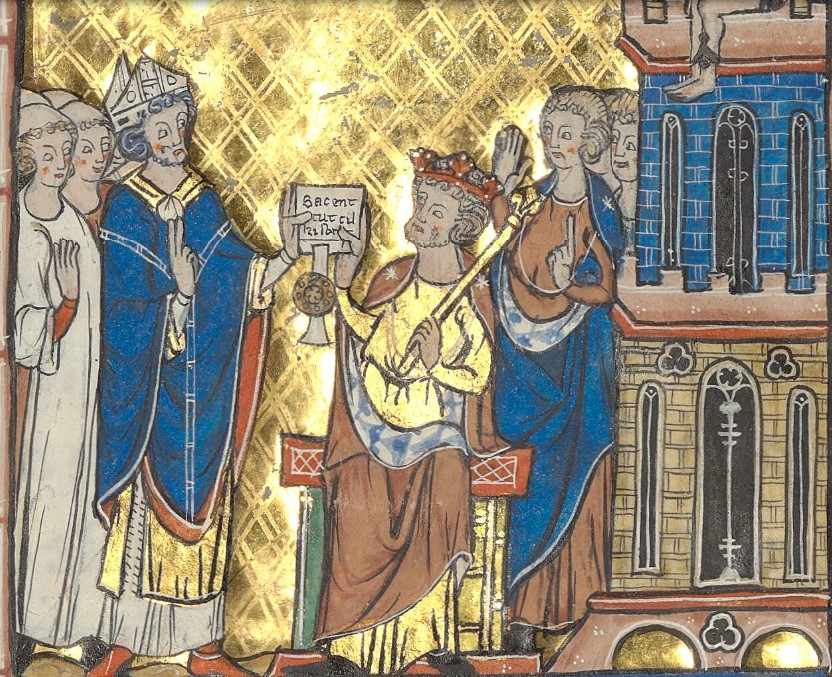
King Baldwin III sends Bishop Frederick to intervene on behalf of Patriarch Aimery

Frederick was a canon regular of the Templum Domini in Jerusalem, and was appointed bishop of Acre and chancellor of Jerusalem around 1150. He participated in the Siege of Ascalon in 1153, and in 1154 King Baldwin III sent him to mediate in the dispute between the prince of Antioch, Raynald of Châtillon, and the Latin patriarch of Antioch. The patriarch returned to Jerusalem with Frederick. In 1155 Frederick accompanied the Latin patriarch of Jerusalem to Rome to complain to Pope Hadrian IV about the conduct of various abbeys and churches of Jerusalem, which had been neglecting to recognize the authority of the patriarch.

When Amalric of Nesle was elected patriarch of Jerusalem in 1157, he was opposed by the archbishop of Caesarea, Hernesius, and the bishop of Bethlehem, Ralph, but Frederick supported him and returned to Rome to appeal to Hadrian IV. Frederick won Hadrian's blessing for the new patriarch, "by the use of lavish gifts, it is claimed", as William of Tyre explains.

== Archbishop of Tyre ==
In March, 1164, Peter of Barcelona, archbishop of Tyre, died, and within a month Frederick was appointed to replace him, at the request of King Amalric. He accompanied Amalric on the expedition against Egypt in 1167, with his own "rather distinguished retinue", according to William. Frederick suffered from dysentery in Egypt after drinking from the Nile and soon returned home. In August of that year he presided over the marriage of Amalric to the Byzantine princess Maria Comnena. A few days later, Frederick appointed William archdeacon of Tyre, but in 1169 he accused the archdeacon probably of receiving to great a salary for his post, which William had probably gained through his friendship with King Amalric. William went to Rome to defend himself against the charges.

=== Embassy to the West ===
In 1169, after the failure of Amalric's invasion of Egypt, the king sent an embassy to Europe to obtain financial aid for the struggling Crusader States and to call for a new crusade. The first embassy, led by Patriarch Amalric and Archbishop Ernesius, was caught in a storm in the Mediterranean and was forced to return home. King Amalric then sent a second embassy under Archbishop Frederick, Bishop John of Banyas and Guibert, the preceptor of the Knights Hospitaller. In July they arrived at Rome and met with Pope Alexander III, but none of the monarchs of Europe were willing to assist the far-away Crusader kingdom: Louis VII of France and Henry II of England were already occupied in warring against each other, but Frederick persuaded Henry to donate money and make a pilgrimage later. Frederick Barbarossa had been excommunicated by Alexander III in 1160 and was currently at war with the Papacy, so no support was forthcoming from him either.

The embassy was also meant to find a suitable husband for the then eleven-year-old Sibylla, the king's daughter, who might one day reign, her brother Baldwin being suspected of having contracted leprosy. In France, Frederick persuaded Count Stephen I of Sancerre and brother-in-law of Louis VII, to come to the east and marry Sibylla. The embassy returned to Jerusalem in 1171, along with Stephen and Duke Hugh III of Burgundy, who came as a representative of Louis VII. It is unknown what Frederick offered the young count, but it seems he never got it, for he returned to France without marrying the princess.

== Death ==
After a long illness, Frederick died in Nablus on October 30, 1174, and was buried in the Templum Domini in Jerusalem. William was appointed archbishop and was consecrated on June 8 of the next year. William describes Frederick as "an extremely tall man. He possessed little education but was inordinately devoted to the art of war."

== Sources ==
- William of Tyre, A History of Deeds Done Beyond the Sea, trans. E.A. Babcock and A.C. Krey. Columbia University Press, 1943
- Bernard Hamilton, The Leper King and his Heirs, Cambridge University Press, 2000.
- Hans E. Mayer, "Frederick of La Roche, bishop of Acre and archbishop of Tyre", Tel Aviver Jahrbuch für deutsche Geschichte 22 (1993), pp. 59–72.

Catholic Church titles
Preceded by Rorgo	Bishop of Acre c. 1150–1164	Succeeded by William
Preceded by Peter of Barcelona	Archbishop of Tyre; 1164–1174	Succeeded by William II
