= William (bishop of Acre) =

Lombard bishop (died 1172)

William was the bishop of Acre in the Kingdom of Jerusalem from c. 1164 until his death on 29 June 1172. He was sent on several diplomatic missions by King Amalric. He was murdered by an apparently mentally ill retainer while returning from a mission to his native Italy.

== Ecclesiastical career ==
William came from Lombardy. He moved to the Kingdom of Jerusalem, where he became archdeacon of Tyre and c. 1164 became bishop of Acre. With the support of his cathedral chapter, he gave a prebend to William of Tyre, who had returned to the kingdom after studying civil law at the University of Bologna. The historians Peter Edbury and John Rowe suggest that Bishop William, as a Lombard, was eager to recruit a Bologna graduate. William of Tyre, the chief chronicler of the crusader states, describes Bishop William as "prudent and discerning" as well as "wise and endowed with eloquence".

When the abbot of Saint Mary of the Latins, either Rainald or Guido, appealed to Pope Alexander III against the decision of Patriarch Fulcher to assign a tithe to the Holy Sepulchre rather than to the abbey, the pope appointed Bishop William to hear the dispute as the judge-delegate. William upheld the ruling. Together with the patriarch and other bishops and archbishops of the Latin Church, William attended a synod in Acre c. 1170. At the synod William offered to permit the construction of a Cluniac monastery in his diocese, but it was decided that an existing monastery at Palmaria would be given to the Cluniacs instead.

== Diplomatic missions ==
In 1169, Bishop William, Patriarch Amalric, and Archbishop Ernesius of Caesarea were sent to Europe by King Amalric to request western help for the kingdom. The prelates were shipwrecked shortly after setting off and did not dare embark again. William accompanied the king on the royal visit to Constantinople in 1171. From Constantinople the king sent William on a further diplomatic mission to Italy. William was to return via Constantinople, where he was to inform Emperor Manuel I Komnenos of the results of the mission.

By 29 June 1172 William and his entourage had reached Adrianople and stopped to rest. There the bishop (in the words of William of Tyre) "met a strange and undeserved fate". One of the party, a young man named Robert, whom Bishop William had personally raised to priesthood, fell sick during the voyage and, according to the account of William of Tyre, "suffered greatly". Robert was resting with the bishop when, as William of Tyre reports, "suddenly a madness came upon him; he seized his sword and stabbed the sleeping bishop, inflicting fatal wounds". William's entourage heard his cries for help, but the door was locked and they had to break it down. They found the bishop dying. He forbade them to seize Robert and implored them that he be pardoned.

According to William of Tyre, some believed that Robert was "not responsible for his wicked act" because he had been "attacked by a sudden violent frenzy"; others claimed that he had "committed the crime through hatred of a certain chamberlain of the bishop, who, presuming too much on his lord's favor, had treated Robert and others badly". The historian Bernard Hamilton concludes that Robert was mentally ill; Steve Tibble interprets this as a psychotic episode.

== Bibliography ==
=== Primary sources ===
- William of Tyre (1943). Babcock, E.A.; Krey, A.C. (eds.). A History of Deeds Done Beyond the Sea. Columbia University Press.

=== Secondary sources ===
- Edbury, Peter W.; Rowe, John G. (1990). William of Tyre: Historian of the Latin East. Cambridge Studies in Medieval Life and Thought: Fourth Series. Cambridge University Press. ISBN 978-0-521-40728-1.
- Hamilton, Bernard (1980). The Latin Church in the Crusader States: The Secular Church. Variorum Publications. ISBN 978-1-351-88705-2.
- Hamilton, Bernard; Jotischky, Andrew (2020). "Benedictine monasteries". Latin and Greek Monasticism in the Crusader States. Cambridge University Press. ISBN 978-0521836388.
- Tibble, Steve (2024). Crusader Criminals: The Knights Who Went Rogue in the Holy Land. Yale University Press. ISBN 978-0-300-27607-7.

Catholic Church titles
Preceded by Frederick	Bishop of Acre c. 1164–1172	Succeeded by Joscius
