= Diocese of Banias =

Roman Catholic see

The diocese of Banias was an episcopal see centered on Banias in the region of Syria. It was originally an Eastern Orthodox see. In 1140, Banias was captured by King Fulk of Jerusalem. The same year, Adam of Acre became the first Roman Catholic bishop to be installed in Banias. Archaeologist Denys Pringle assumes that a cathedral church was constructed in Banias, but its location has not yet been determined.

The Latin bishop of Banias was a suffragan to the archbishop of Tyre. Of all the bishops in the kingdom, only the bishop of Banias, the bishop of Beirut, and the archbishop of Petra were exempt from providing sergeants to the royal army.

The bishop's power declined when, in 1157, the lord of Banias, Humphrey II of Toron, granted half of Banias to the Order of the Hospital. In 1164 Banias was conquered by Nur ad-Din Zengi, becoming the first diocese in the Kingdom of Jerusalem to be lost to the Muslims. The incumbent bishop, John, was not in Banias at the time and continued to hold the title until his death in 1170. The Muslim conquest of Banias rendered the bishop of Banias essentially an auxiliary bishop at the Cathedral of Tyre. No titular bishop was appointed to succeed John.

In 1252, there was a titular bishop of Banias who lived in Italy. In 1254, he was made bishop of Grasse. At that time, the bishop of Banias was the only bishop of the kingdom, much reduced since 1187, who was not resident in the kingdom. The titular bishops were nevertheless occasionally called on to deal with business relating to the kingdom, such as when Pope Gregory X tasked the bishop (along with the bishop of Bethlehem and the archbishop of Nazareth) with ordering King Hugh I to answer the claim of Maria of Antioch to the throne of Jerusalem.

== Bibliography ==
- Hamilton, Bernard (1980). The Latin Church in the Crusader States: The Secular Church. Variorum Publications. ISBN 978-1-351-88705-2.
- Hamilton, Bernard; Jotischky, Andrew (2020). "The Austin Canons". In Derek Baker (ed.). Latin and Greek Monasticism in the Crusader States. Cambridge University Press. ISBN 978-0521836388.
- Pringle, D. (1993). The Churches of the Crusader Kingdom of Jerusalem: A Corpus: Volume 1, A-K (excluding Acre and Jerusalem). Cambridge University Press. ISBN 978-0-521-39036-1.
