= Latin Catholic Diocese of Acre =

Latin Catholic diocese in Israel

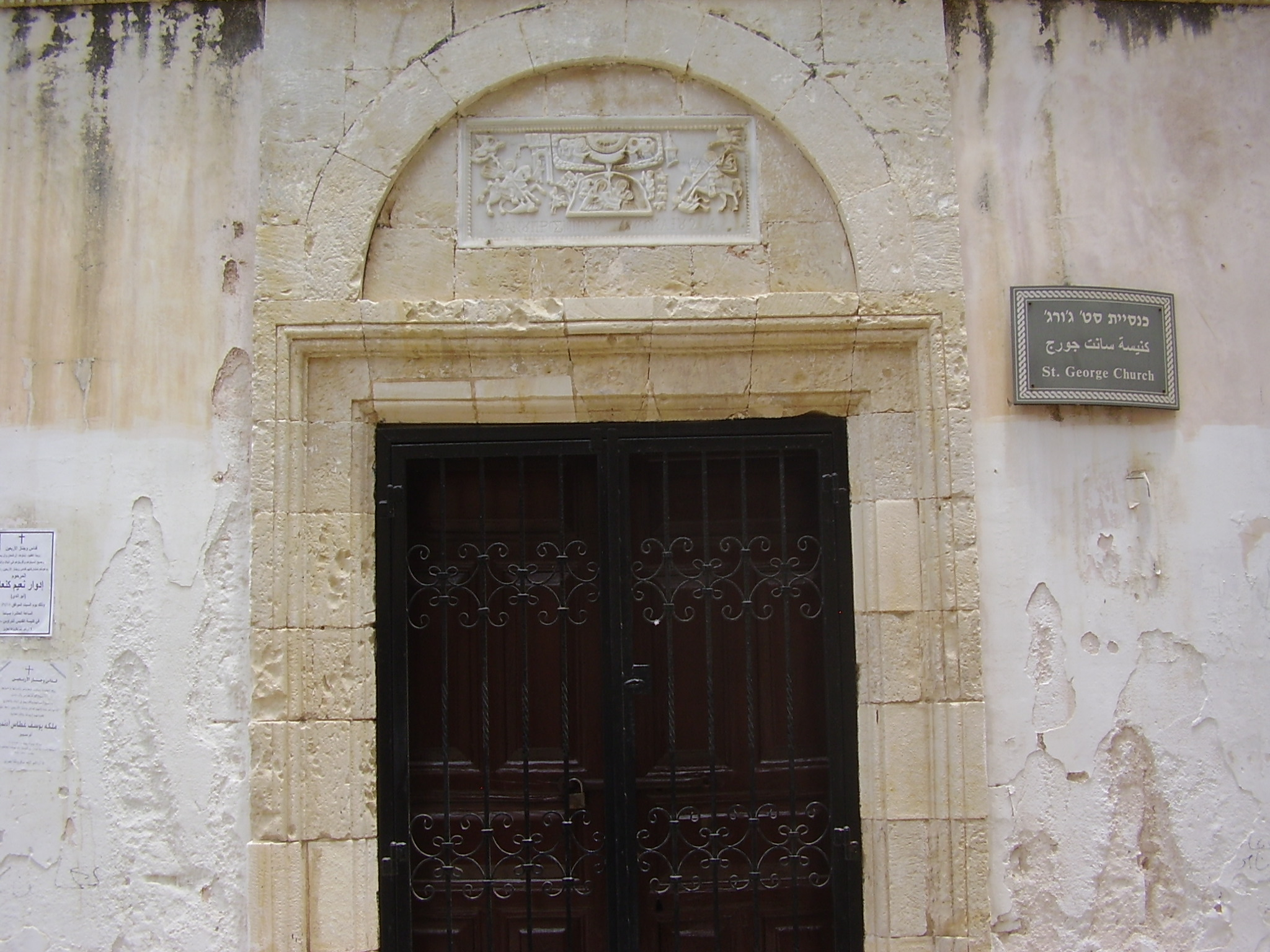
Saint Georges Acre, Israel.

The bishop of Acre was a suffragan bishop of the archbishop of Tyre in the medieval Latin Kingdom of Jerusalem. Acre is present-day Akko, Israel.

== History ==
The introduction of Christianity to Ptolemais, as Acre was known in ancient times, dates back to Apostolic times. The Apostle Paul, returning from his trip to Macedonia, in Achaea and Asia, landed at Tyre, and from there traveled to Ptolemais, where he stayed some days with the local Christian community (acts 21.7).

The first bishop known is Clarus, who in 190 attended a Council meeting of some bishops of Phoenicia and Palestine to deal with the issue of the date of the Paschal feast. But we must go to the fourth century to find the next bishop, Aeneas, who took part at the First Council of Nicaea in 325 and at the Synod held in Antioch in 341. Nectabo was one of the fathers of the first Ecumenical Council of Constantinople in 381. Between the 4th and 5th centuries lived bishop Antiochus, opponent of John Chrysostom. Helladius participated in the first Council of Ephesus in 431. Paul took part in the Council held at Antioch of 445 to judge the work of Athanasius of Perrhe and at the Council of Chalcedon of 451. In 518 Bishop John signed a Synodal letter against Severus of Antioch and the Monophysite party. Finally, the last known bishop is George, who attended the second Council of Constantinople in 553.

Following the crusades in the 12th century, the city, called St-Jean d'Acre, became part of the Kingdom of Jerusalem and was a diocese of the Latin Church, headquartered at the Cathedral of the Holy Cross. Against the eastern practice and ecclesiastical tradition, the Crusaders detached the diocese, along with the rest of southern Phoenicia, from the Patriarchate of Antioch, and made it a suffragan of Jerusalem.

After the fall of Jerusalem in 1187, the seat of the patriarch moved to Tyre and then to St-Jean d'Acre in 1191; the patriarch returned to Jerusalem in 1229, when the city was returned to the crusaders, then back to St-Jean d'Acre in 1244. St-Jean d'Acre had its own bishop until 1263, when the patriarchs of Jerusalem administered it until the fall of the city into the hands of the Muslims in 1291. The most famous bishop of St-Jean d'Acre was the chronicler Jacques de Vitry.

Ptolemais in Phoenicia survives today as a titular see; until the mid-19th century it had the name Aconensis or Acconensis.

== List of known bishops of Acre ==
Antiquity

- Clarus (late 2nd century)
- Aeneas (before-after 341 325)
- Nectabo (mentioned in 381)
- Antiochus (early 5th century)
- Helladius (mentioned in 431)
- Paul (before 445-after 451)
- John (mentioned in 518)
- George (mentioned in 553)

Kingdom of Jerusalem

- John † (before 1135 – aft. 1133)
- Rorgo † (mentioned in 1147)
- Hugh of le Mans?
- Frederick de la Roche (c. 1150-1164)
- William (c. 1164-1172)
- Joscius fl.1172
- Rufinus, killed at the Battle of Hattin c. 1187
- John of Noyon, chancellor to Baldwin IX of Flanders, during the Fourth Crusade
- Florent c. 1208
- James of Vitry 1216–1228
- Ralph (Crusade era)
- Nicolas Arlon, O. Carm. † (27 Jun 1344 Appointed – )
- Johann Goldener, O.S.A. † (14 Jan 1451 Appointed – 25 Apr 1475)

Modern (titular)

- Titular Bishop: Bishop Armand de Rohan-Soubise-Ventadour (1742.07.30 – 1747.04.10)
- Titular Bishop: Bishop Luiz de Castro Pereira, C.S.J. (1804.10.29 – 1822.08.01)
- Titular Bishop: Bishop Maciej Pawel Mozdzeniewski (1815.07.10 – 1819.04.02)
- Titular Bishop: Bishop Ferdinand Maria von Chotek (later Archbishop) (1817.04.14 – 1831.09.30)
- Titular Bishop: Bishop Franciscus Renatus Boussen (1832.12.17 – 1834.06.23)
- Titular Bishop: Archbishop Alois Josef Schrenk (1838.02.12 – 1838.09.17)
- Titular Bishop: Bishop Tommaso Feeny (Thomas Feeny) (1839.07.27 – 1848.01.11)
- Titular Bishop: Bishop Cassien-Léonard de Peretti (1875.03.31 – 1892.02.22)
- Titular Archbishop: Archbishop José Marcondes Homem de Melo (1906.12.06 – 1908.08.09)
- Titular Archbishop: Archbishop Augustin Dontenwill, O.M.I. (1909.01.19 – 1931.11.30)
- Louis Joseph El-Khazen, O.A.M. † (23 Feb 1919 Appointed – 22 Feb 1933 Died)
- Titular Bishop: Bishop Louis-Eugène-Arsène Turquetil, O.M.I. (1931.12.15 – 1955.06.14)
- Titular Bishop: Bishop Edmundo Luís Kunz (1955.08.01 – 1988.09.12)
- Joseph Khoury † (Auxiliary Bishop: 4 May 1956 to 11 Dec 1959)
- Camille Zaidan (13 Aug 2011 Appointed – 16 Jun 2012 Confirmed, Archbishop of Antélias (Maronite))
- Joseph Emile Mouawad (16 Jun 2012 Appointed – current)
