= Letard =

Letard may refer to:

- Liudhard (fl. 590s), bishop of Senlis
- Letard I, archbishop of Nazareth (r. 1154–1158)
- Letard II, archbishop of Nazareth (r. 1158–1190)
