= Letard II =

12th-century Catholic bishop

Letard II was a Catholic prelate who served as the archbishop of Nazareth in Galilee (then part of the Kingdom of Jerusalem) from 1158 to his death in 1190. He worked closely with the canons of Nazareth and mediated in several disputes among the clergy of the kingdom. A major renovation of the Church of the Annunciation was started during Letard's episcopacy. He was close to Kings Baldwin III and Amalric and supported King Guy against Count Raymond III of Tripoli. He warned Guy about the incursion of the Egyptian ruler Saladin into Galilee, but the Christian army could not prevent Saladin from conquering the kingdom. Having avoided the sack of Nazareth, Letard died during Guy's siege of Acre.

== Background ==
Letard had become prior of Nazareth by 1145 under Archbishop Robert I. Robert died shortly after the 1153 siege of Ascalon and was succeeded by Letard II's namesake, Archbishop Letard I, while Letard II remained prior. Upon Letard I's death in 1158, Letard II became archbishop. Like Letard I, Letard II was close to King Baldwin III; he and his chaplain, Ralph the Englishman, attended the king at Acre in July 1160. Because Nazareth was an ecclesiastical lordship, Letard also had a seat in the High Court, but rarely participated in secular affairs.

Letard II was an acquaintance of Archbishop William of Tyre, the chief chronicler of the kingdom's history. William, who had a positive opinion about very few of his fellow bishops, described Letard as "a very pleasant man, affable and kindly", but mentioned him only once in his chronicle.

== Episcopacy ==
=== Ecclesiastical issues ===
Having been their prior, Letard worked to establish the rights of the canons of Nazareth. The historian Bernard Hamilton presumes that it is on Letard's request that in 1161 the Latin patriarch of Jerusalem, Amalric of Nesle, convoked a synod that endorsed Letard's agreement with the Abbey of Saint Mary of the Valley of Jehosaphat. The agreement provided that the canons of Nazareth would have the right to be hosted one day a year at the Jehosaphat abbey. Letard also, in contrast to the previous archbishops, involved the canons in the administration of the archbishopric.

Letard retained his privileged position at court during the reign of King Amalric. The 1170 earthquake that wrecked the Principality of Antioch and the County of Tripoli to the north of the kingdom did not directly affect Nazareth, but Letard and his canons complained to Pope Alexander III that the damage it caused to the kingdom's defenses allowed Muslim raiders to carry off peasants, leading to financial difficulties to Letard and the canons.

In 1174 Letard settled the dispute of the bishop of Tiberias, Gerald, who was his suffragan, and the abbot of Mount Tabor, Garinus. In 1178 Letard again mediated, this time with Bishop Joscius of Acre, when Gerald disputed tithes with the Jehosaphat abbey. He also witnessed the agreements of Garinus with the prior of the Holy Sepulchre in 1175 and the lady of Palmaria, Hawisa, in 1180.

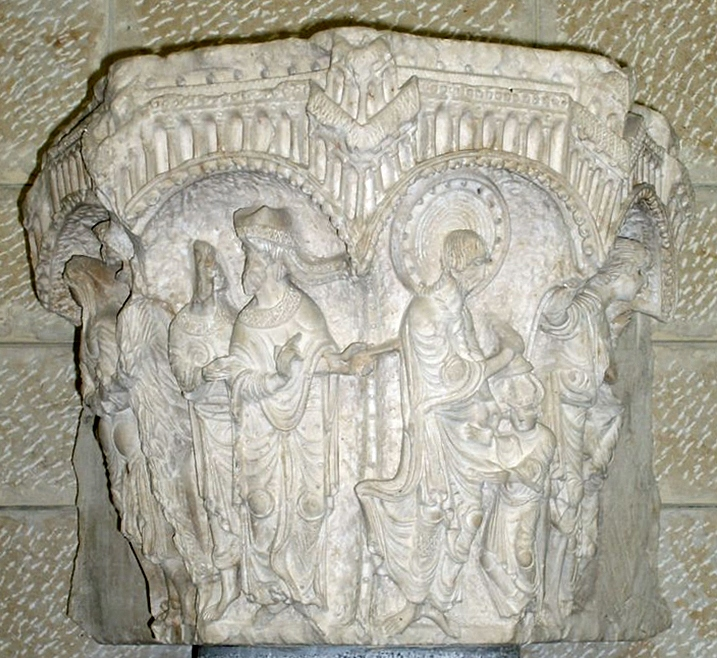
Folda associates much of the artistic work done in the Church of the Annunciation with Letard II.

The art historian Jaroslav Folda presents Letard as the principal force behind the expansion and decoration of the Church of the Annunciation in Nazareth in the 1170s. He credits Letard with initiating and financing a major sculptural program, and argues that Letard had the freedom to make these artistic decisions because, unlike the churches in Jerusalem and Bethlehem, the Nazareth church was not also claimed by the Greek Orthodox, Syriac Orthodox, and Armenian Apostolic communities. Letard's aim, according to Folda, was to distinguish the Church of the Annunciation from other major Christian pilgrimage sites, especially the Holy Sepulchre and the Church of the Nativity, and to underscore that the church was one of the three holiest places in the kingdom.

=== Political upheaval and war ===
King Guy ascended in mid-1186. Raymond, who was his vassal as the prince of Galilee, refused to acknowledge Guy as king. Although his fief was in Galilee, Letard supported Guy. Letard was a valuable ally: not only did he owe knight service for his fief, but in times of crisis he was also bound to provide the crown with 150 sergeants. In 1186 Pope Urban III appointed Letard to investigate, as judge delegate, whether the king and Count Raymond III of Tripoli had infringed the rights of the Republic of Genoa. By that time Letard was the longest-serving bishop in the kingdom.

The situation in the kingdom became even more dire in early 1187 when the Egyptian ruler Saladin started amassing troops at its border. Raymond sought Saladin's protection and allowed Muslim troops into Tiberias. Letard stationed lookouts in his fief to monitor enemy activity, and just before dawn on 1 May, they brought word that a substantial Muslim force had crossed into Galilee. Letard sent word to Gerard of Ridefort and Roger des Moulins, respectively the masters of the Knights Templar and Knights Hospitaller; the archbishop knew that they were at La Fève on their way to attempt to reconciliate Raymond with Guy. Letard sent his vassals and seargents to join the knights and the king's garrison; they were crushed by the much larger Muslim force at Le Cresson, and Roger des Moulins was killed. Archbishop Letard, Archbishop Joscius of Tyre, Gerard of Ridefort, and the lord of Nablus, Balian of Ibelin, then hastened to Tiberias and convinced the count to make peace with the king.

The battle of Hattin on 4 July 1187 ended in a decisive defeat of the kingdom by Saladin's forces. King Guy was taken prisoner. Amid the chaos, Letard fled to Tyre—a city that, under Conrad of Montferrat's command, held firm against Saladin's advance. He was thus absent when Nazareth was sacked by the Muslims. Letard counselled Conrad, but remained loyal to Guy. Upon his release in 1189, Guy laid a siege to Acre. Letard joined him. Conditions in the camp were harsh. In 1190 an epidemic killed Queen Sibylla and her children. Letard died too, as did Patriarch Heraclius; the archbishop of Petra, Guerric; and the bishops of Beirut, Hebron, Lydda, Sidon, and Tiberias; and the bishop-elect of Acre.
