= Basilica of the Annunciation =

Catholic church in Nazareth

Coordinates: 32°42′08″N 35°17′52″E

Church of the Annunciation
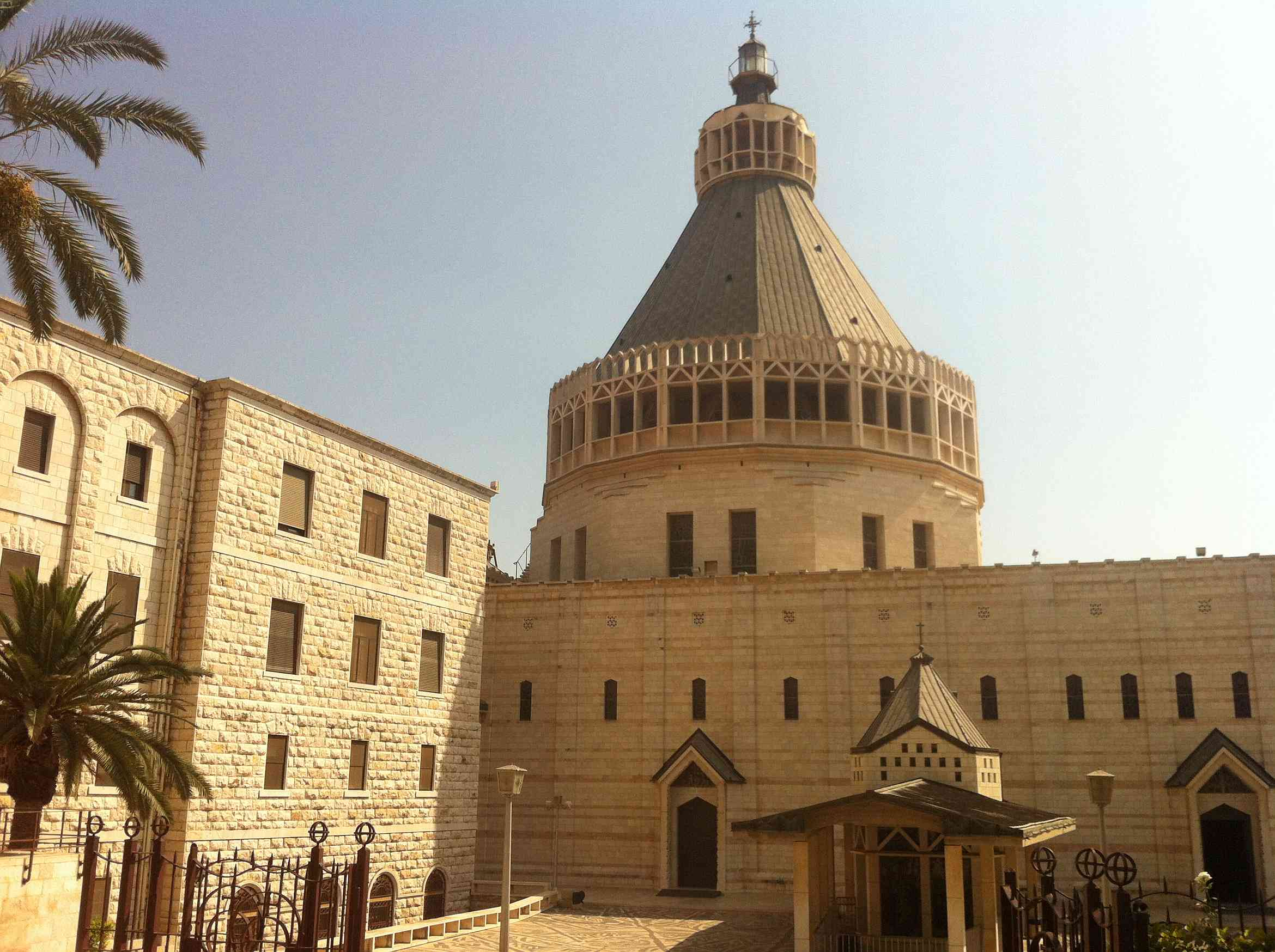
- Church from north

Religion
- Affiliation: Catholic
- Province: Latin Patriarchate of Jerusalem
- Ecclesiastical or organizational status: Minor Basilica
- Year consecrated: 1969

Location
- Location: Nazareth, Israel
- Interactive map of Church of the Annunciation

Architecture
- Architect: Giovanni Muzio
- Completed: 1969
- Dome height (outer): 55 metres

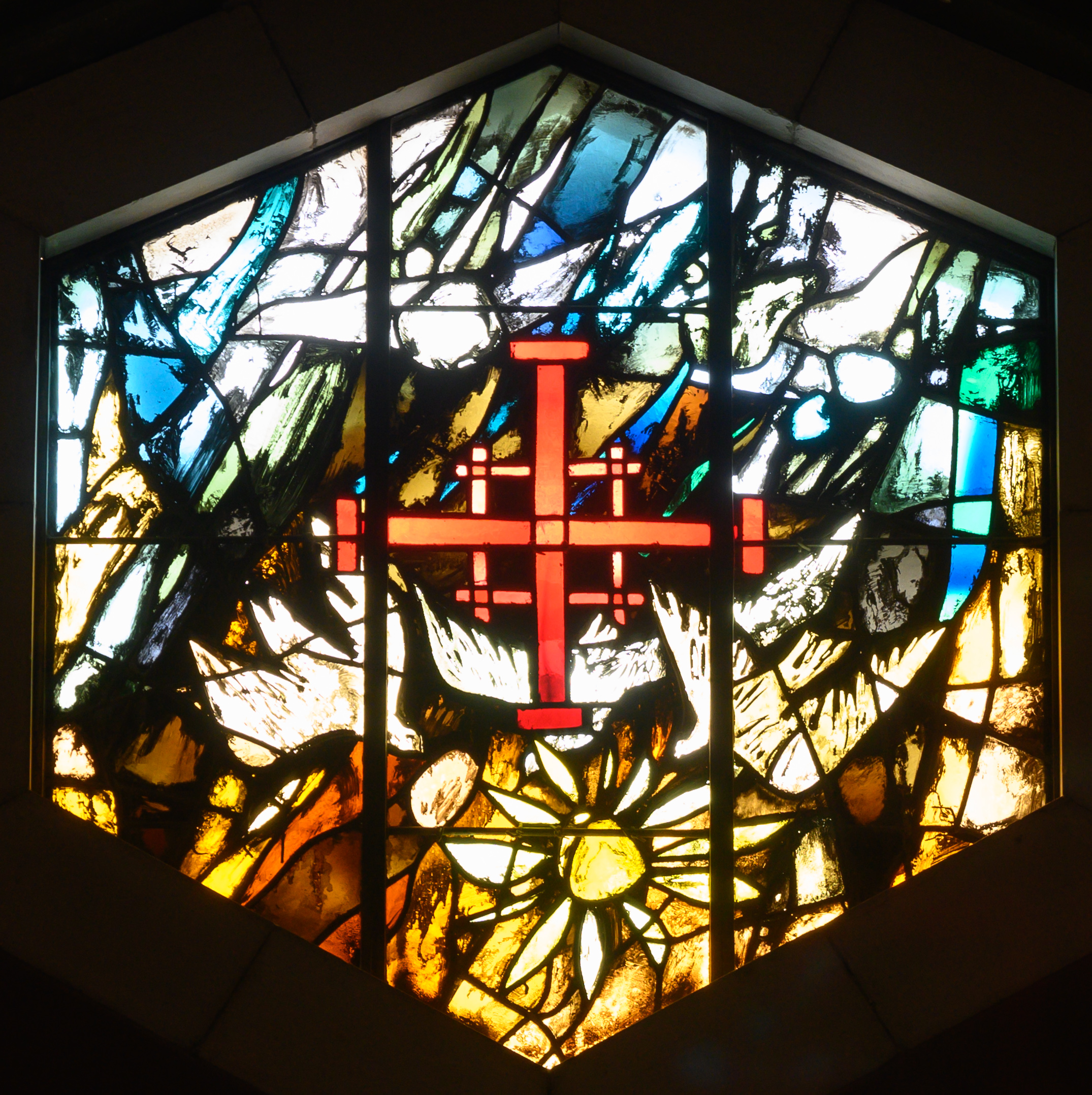
A stained-glass window depicting a Jerusalem cross

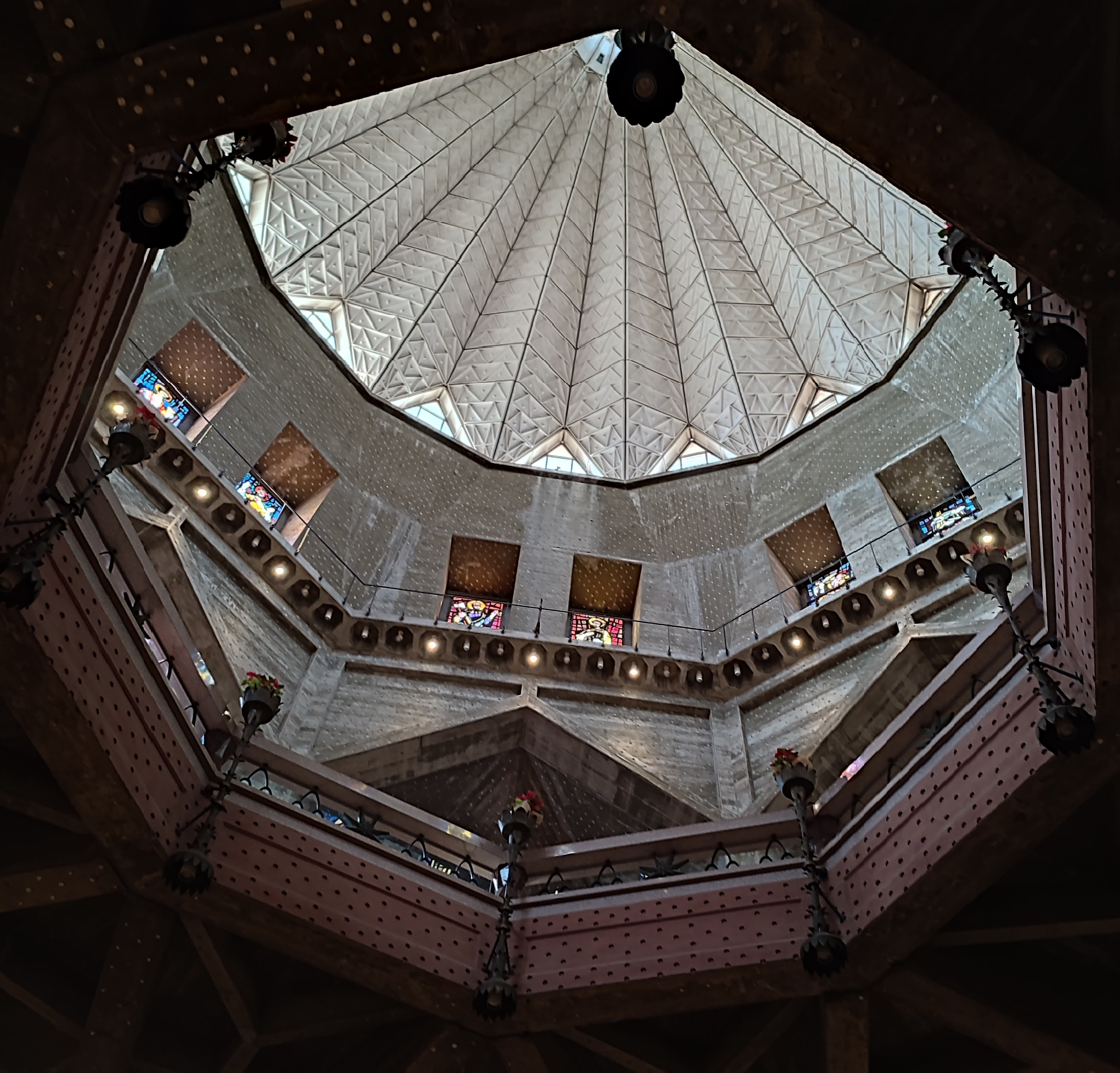
Cupola

The Church of the Annunciation (Latin: Basilica Annuntiationis, Arabic: كنيسة البشارة, romanized: Kanīsat al-Bišāra, Hebrew: כנסיית הבשורה), sometimes also referred to as the Basilica of the Annunciation, is a Catholic church in Nazareth, in northern Israel. It is one of two claimants to the site of the Annunciation – in which angel Gabriel appeared to the Virgin Mary and announced that she would give birth to Jesus – the other being the Greek Orthodox Church of the Annunciation.

It was established over what Catholic tradition holds to be the site of the house of the Virgin Mary.

== History ==
=== Tradition ===
The church was established at the site where, according to one tradition, the Annunciation took place. Another tradition, based on the apocryphal Protoevangelium of James, holds that this event commenced while Mary was drawing water from a local spring in Nazareth, and the Greek Orthodox Church of the Annunciation was erected at that alternate site.

=== Late Roman/Byzantine shrine ===
Christian tradition has held that a structure was commissioned by Emperor Constantine I, whose mother, Saint Helena, helped to found churches commemorating important events in Jesus Christ's life. The Church of the Annunciation was founded around the same time as the Church of the Nativity (the birthplace) and the Church of the Holy Sepulchre (the tomb). Some version of it was known to have still been in existence around 570.

A competing view is that the Church was the site of the Holy House, which, according to Catholic legend, was transported by angels across the sea to Loreto, Italy, at the time of the Muslim conquest.

=== Crusader church ===
The second church was built over the ruins of the Byzantine-era church during the Crusades, following the conquest of Nazareth by Tancred in 1102. The church was undergoing a considerable expansion under Letard II, archbishop of Nazareth, in the 1170s. The expansion was never completed. Five Romanesque capitals, discovered during excavations in 1909, had not yet been installed in 1187 when news of Saladin's victory in the Battle of Hattin reached the city. Saladin granted permission to Franciscan priests to remain in Nazareth to oversee services at the church.

In 1260, Baybars and his Mamluk army destroyed the church during their attack on Nazareth.

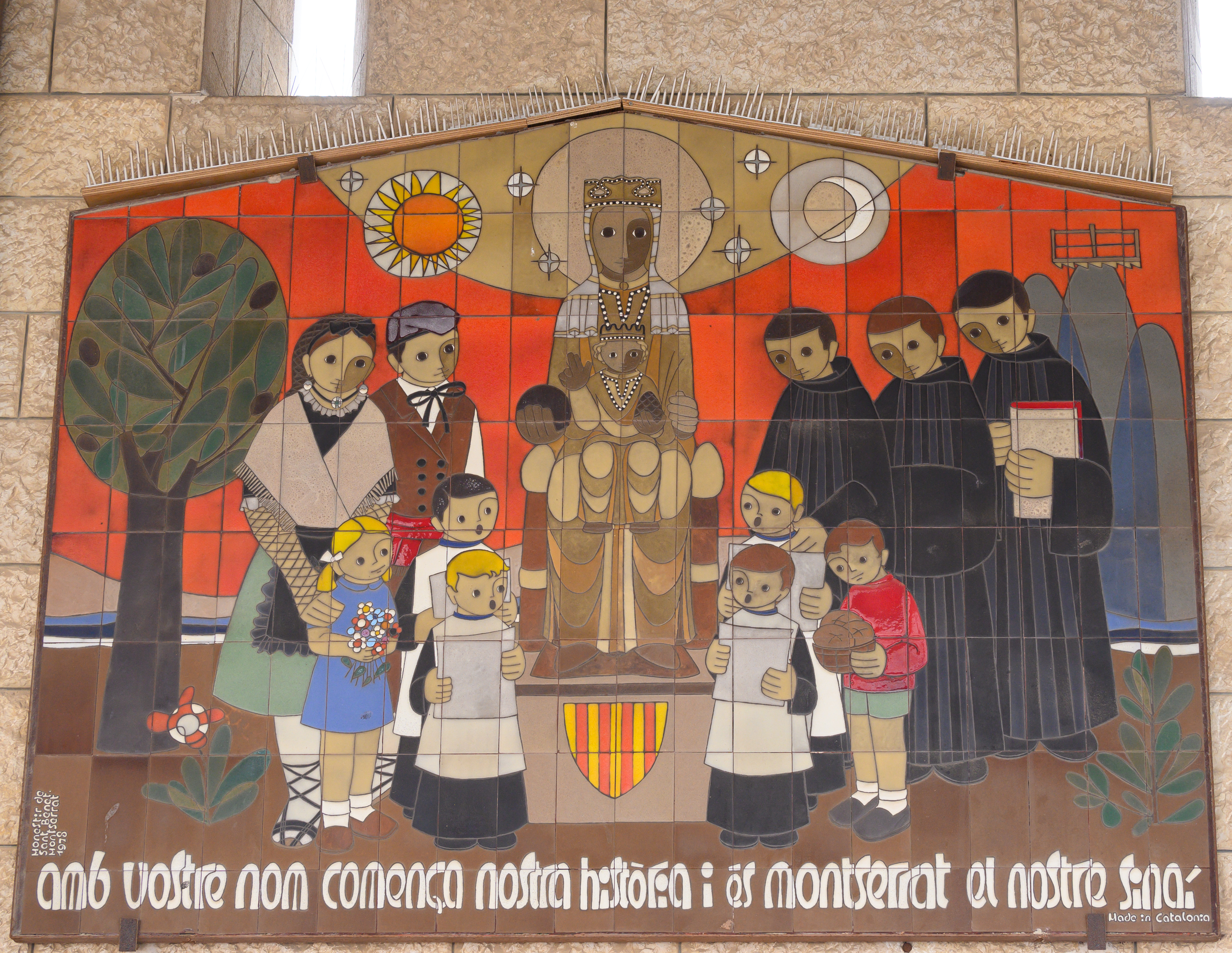
Gift from Spain

=== Mamluk and early Ottoman period ===
A small number of Franciscans managed to stay in Nazareth until the fall of Acre in 1291. In the three centuries that followed, the Franciscans were in and out of Nazareth, depending on the local political situation, which was constantly in flux. Franciscan accounts of this period document their expulsion in 1363, their return in 1468 and a massacre of some of their members in 1542. Local Christian families with Franciscan support took care of the holy site even during this difficult period.

=== 17th- and 18th-century churches ===
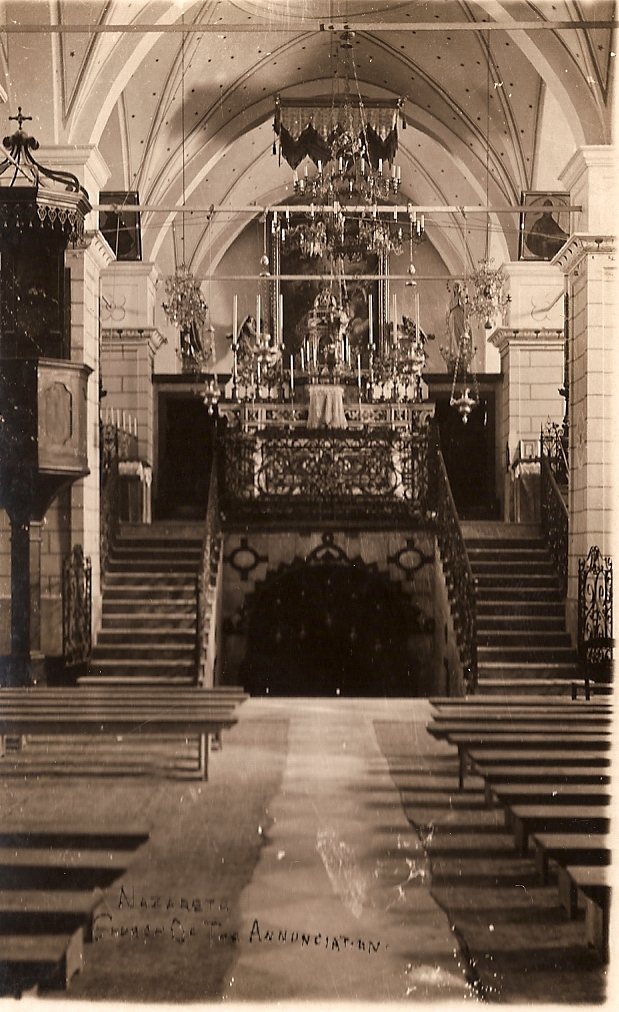
The Church of the Annunciation, interior (about 1925)

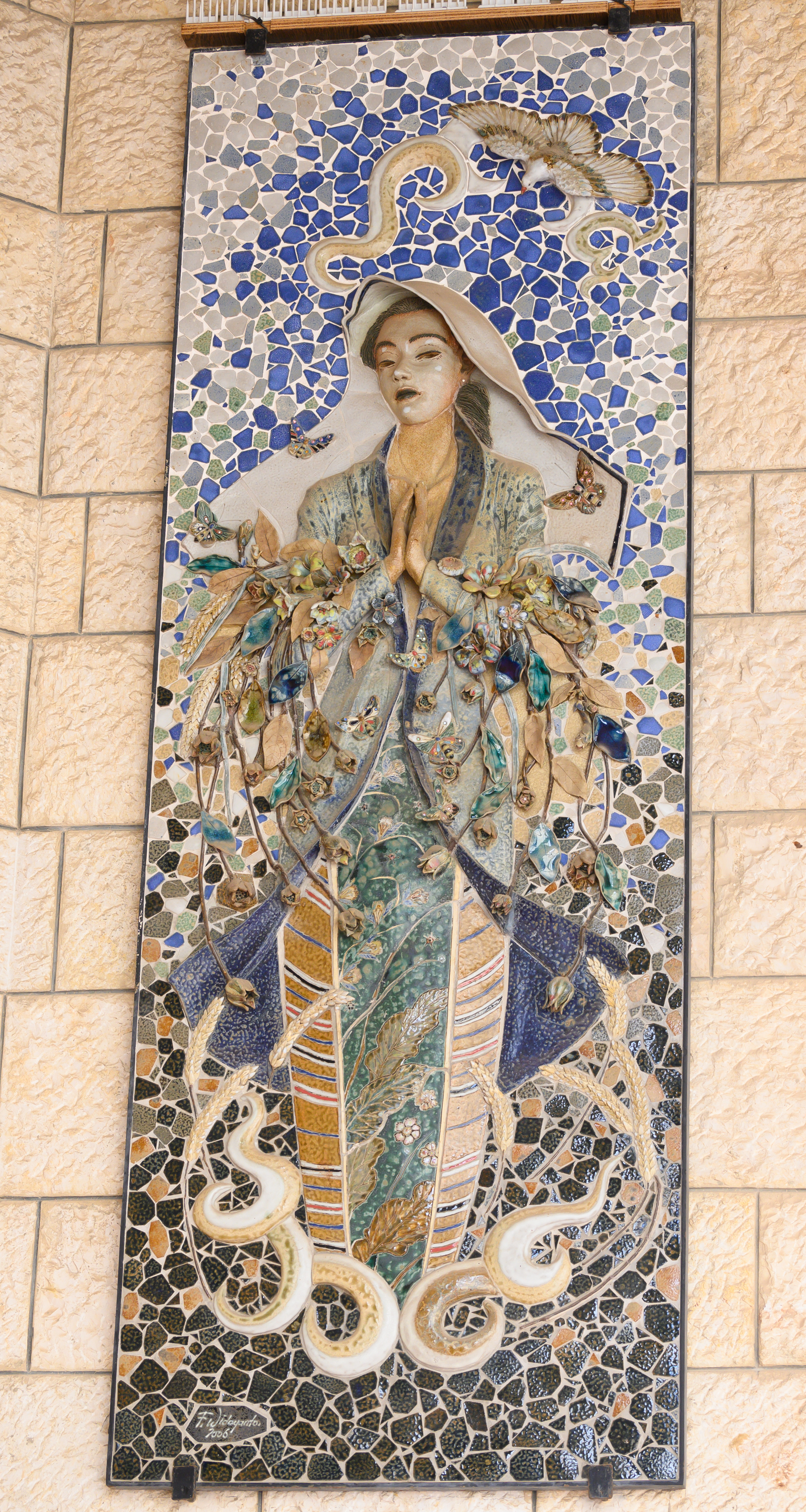
Gift from Indonesia

Emir Fakhr ad-Din granted the Franciscans permission to return to Nazareth and the church ruins in 1620, at which time they constructed a small structure to enclose the holy grotto that is venerated as the house of Mary.

In 1730, Dahir al-Umar permitted construction of a new church, which became a central gathering place for Nazareth Latin community. The church was enlarged in 1877.

=== 20th-century basilica ===
The old church was completely demolished in 1954 to allow for the construction of a new basilica. The new basilica was designed by the Italian architect Giovanni Muzio, and built by the Israeli building firm Solel Boneh during the years 1960–1969. The Chief Engineer at this project was Ing. Shlomo Lopatin (Aluf) who was dedicated to the Basilica building process for more than 10 years, and it was indeed his life-project. It is built in a style sometimes characterised as Italian Brutalism.

Pope Paul VI celebrated Mass in the new church during his trip to the Holy Land in 1964 The basilica was completed in 1969.

Used by the Latin parish, it remains under the control of the Franciscans. It is the largest Christian Church building or sanctuary in the Middle East under the supervision of the Congregation for the Oriental Churches.

Pope John Paul II made a pilgrimage to the Holy Land for the Great Jubilee of 2000 and celebrated Mass at the Basilica of the Annunciation on March 25, 2000.

== Significance and rank ==
Under Canon Law, the church enjoys the status of a minor basilica. A historically significant site, considered sacred within some circles of Christianity, particularly Catholicism, the basilica attracts many Catholic, Anglican, and Eastern Orthodox Christian visitors every year.

== Description ==
The current Catholic Church is a two-storey building finished in 1969 over the site of earlier churches from the Byzantine, Crusader, and the Israeli -period churches.

=== Lower church ===
The lower level contains the Grotto of the Annunciation, believed by many Christians to be the remains of the original childhood home of Mary.

=== Upper church ===
The upper level contains a number of images of Mary, mainly mosaics, each from a different country with significant Catholic population.

=== Courtyard gallery of Madonnas ===
On the walls enclosing the courtyard of the basilica, there is a gallery with icons (mainly mosaics, but also some made of ceramic tiles) representing some of the most important Marian devotions in different countries. Some of the main Marian devotions from Spain are included: the Virgin of Candelaria, patron saint of the Canary Islands; the Virgin of Montserrat, patroness of Catalonia; the Virgin of the Forsaken, patroness of Valencia; and the Virgin of Guadalupe, patroness of Extremadura.

== Mass arrangements ==
As of November 2018, Catholic Masses are given in the Grotto, Upper Basilica, and adjacent St. Joseph's Church in the Arabic and Italian languages, according to the main church sign in English.

== Gallery ==
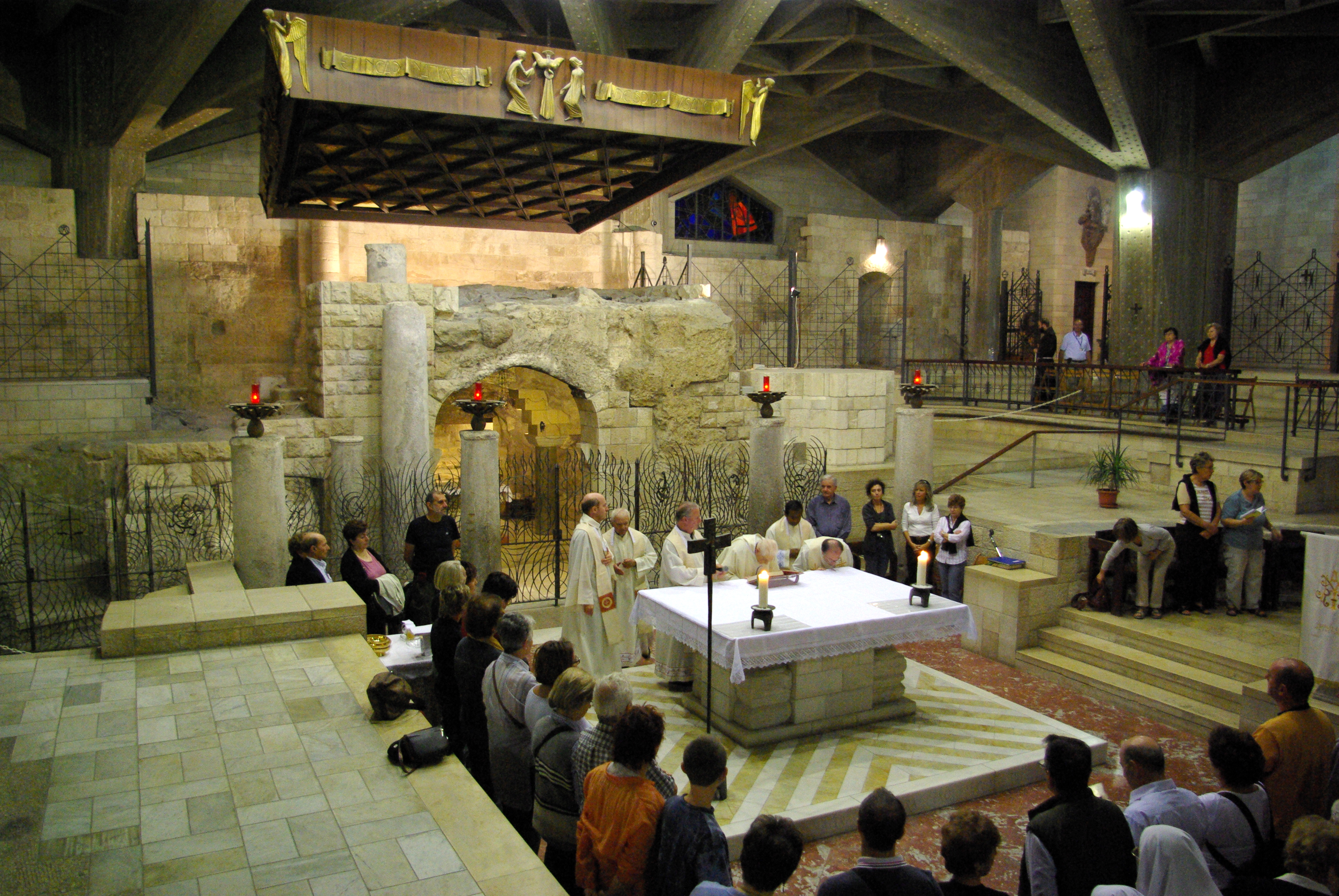
Catholic Mass at the Grotto of the Annunciation (lower level of the church).

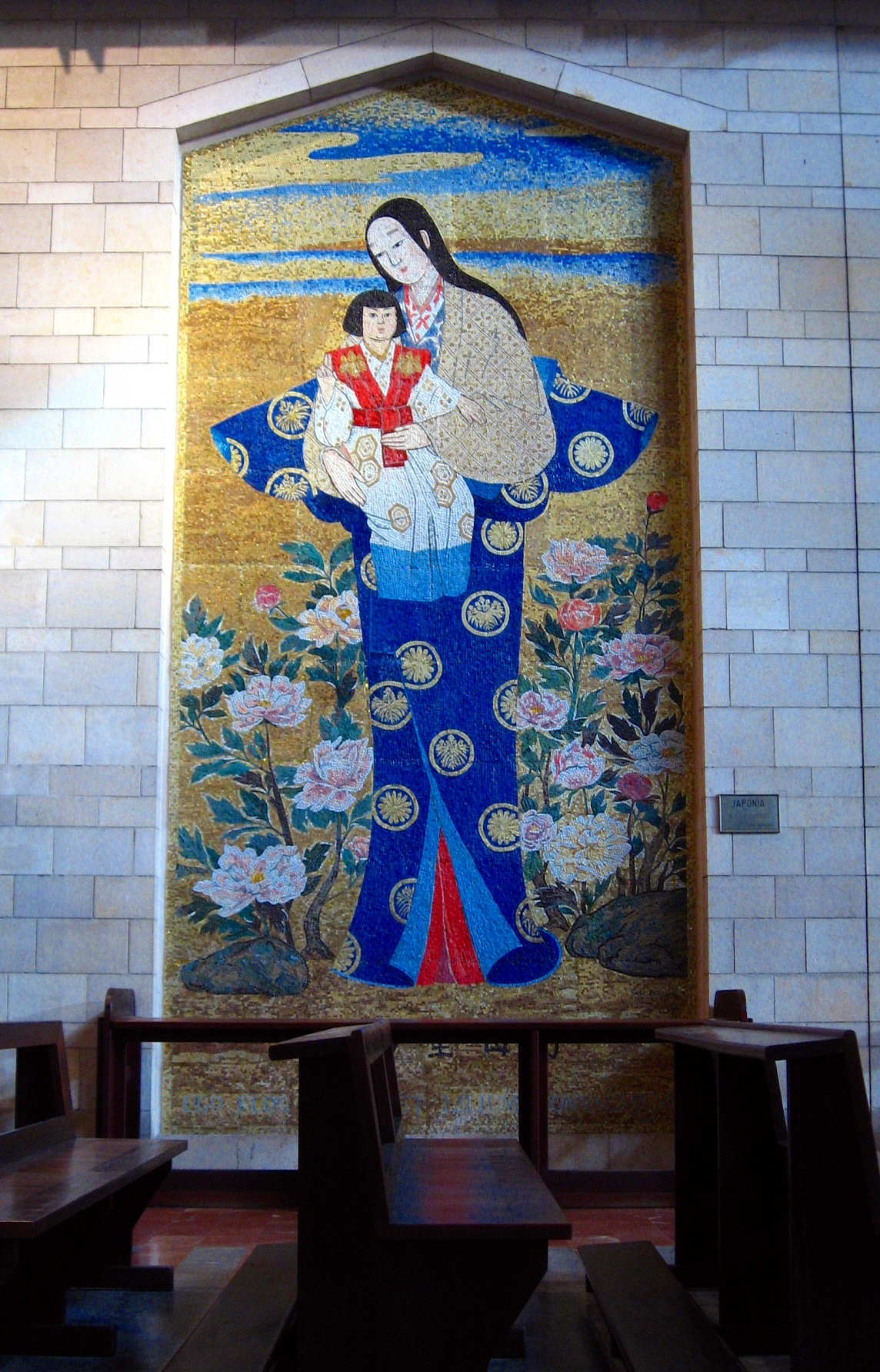
Japanese mosaic of Madonna and Child, in the upper church.

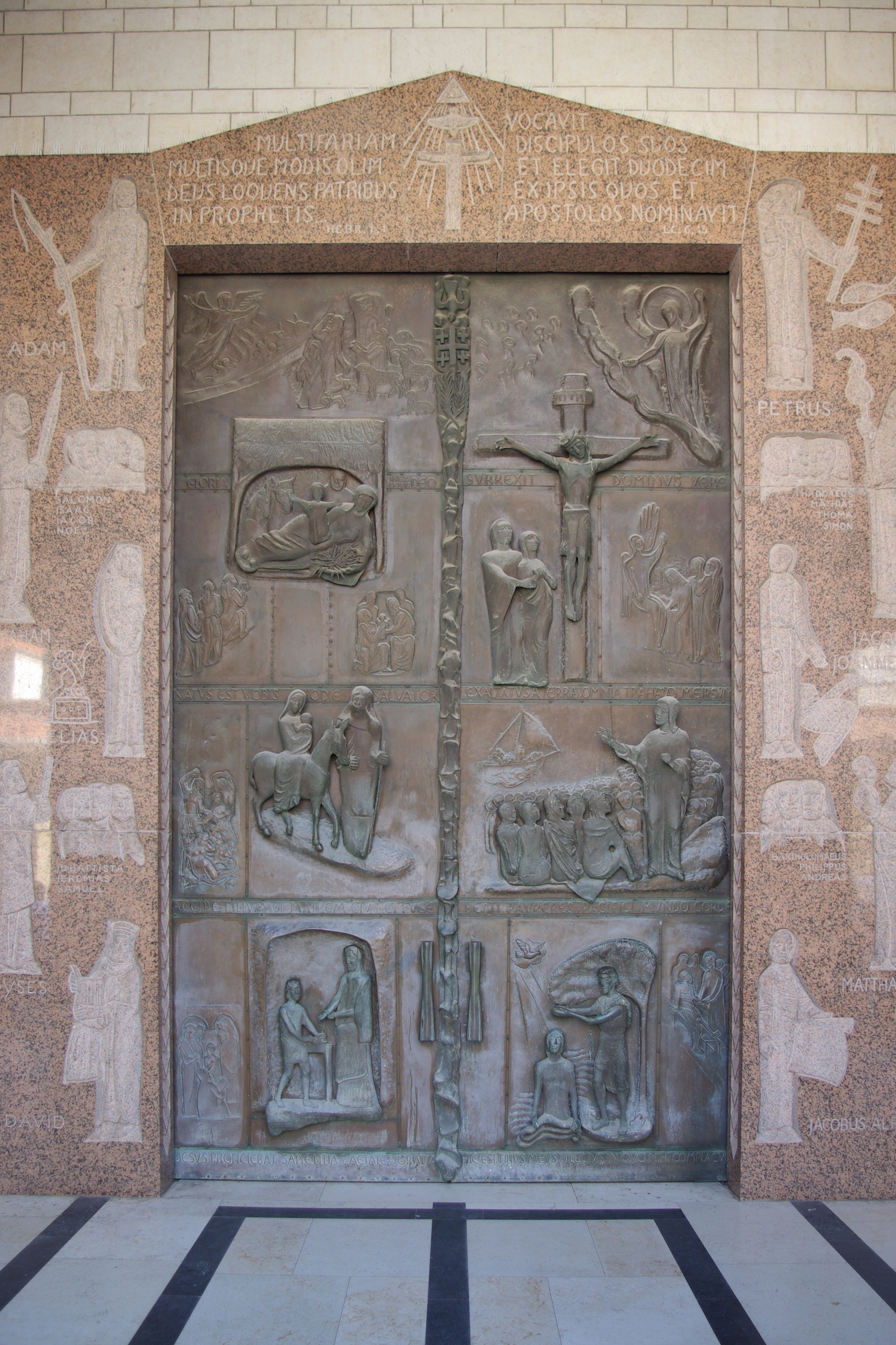
Front door of the church, depicting major events in Jesus' life.

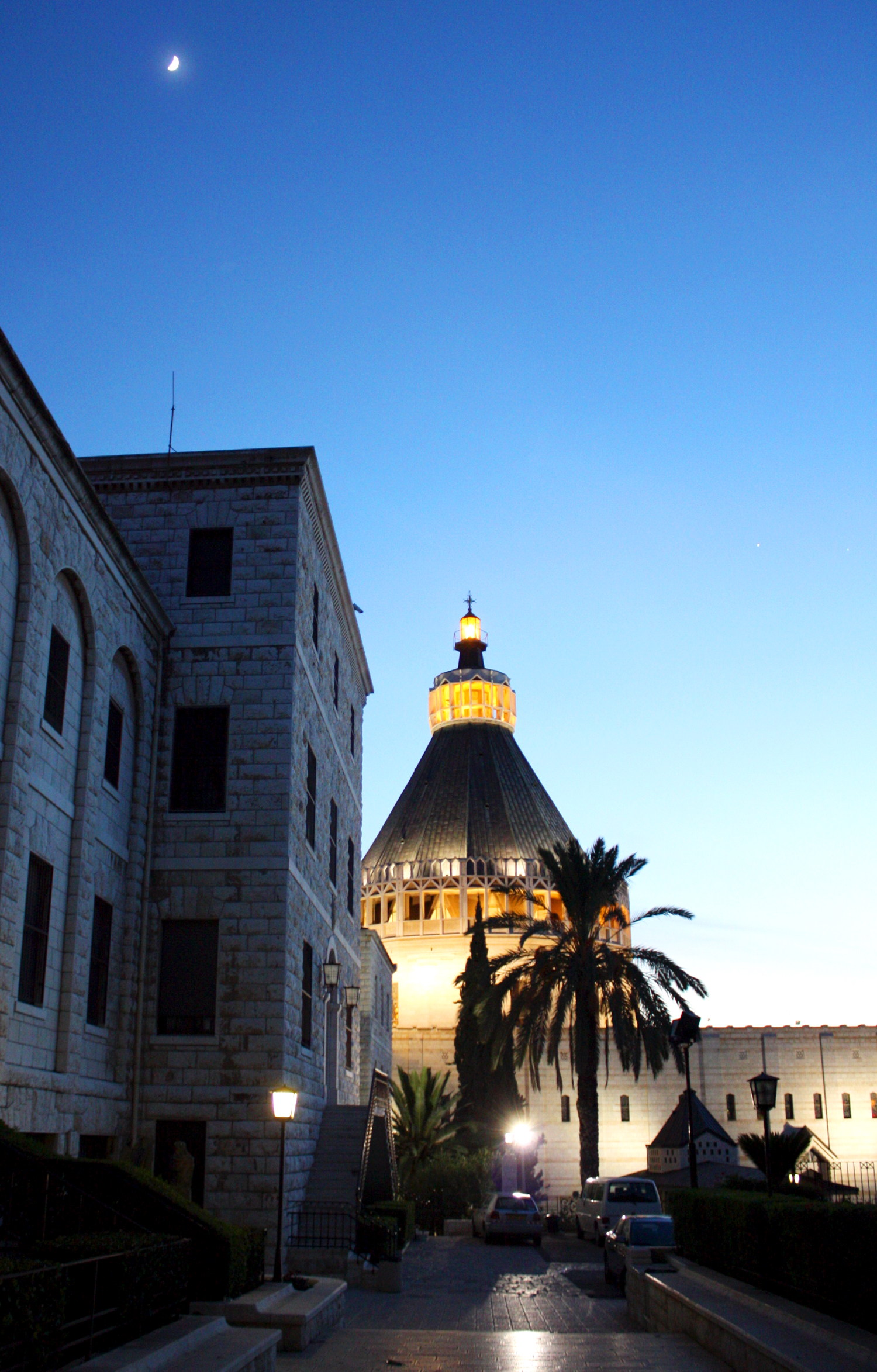
Night view of the Basilica

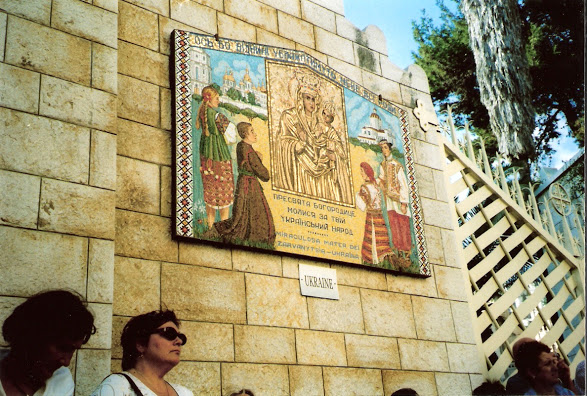
Mosaic from Ukraine in the church courtyard

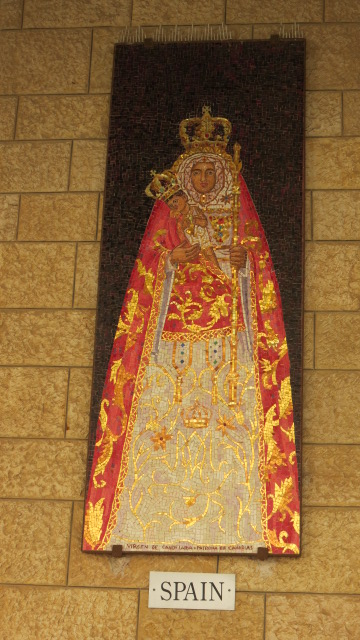
Mosaic depicting the Virgin of Candelaria (patron saint of the Canary Islands).

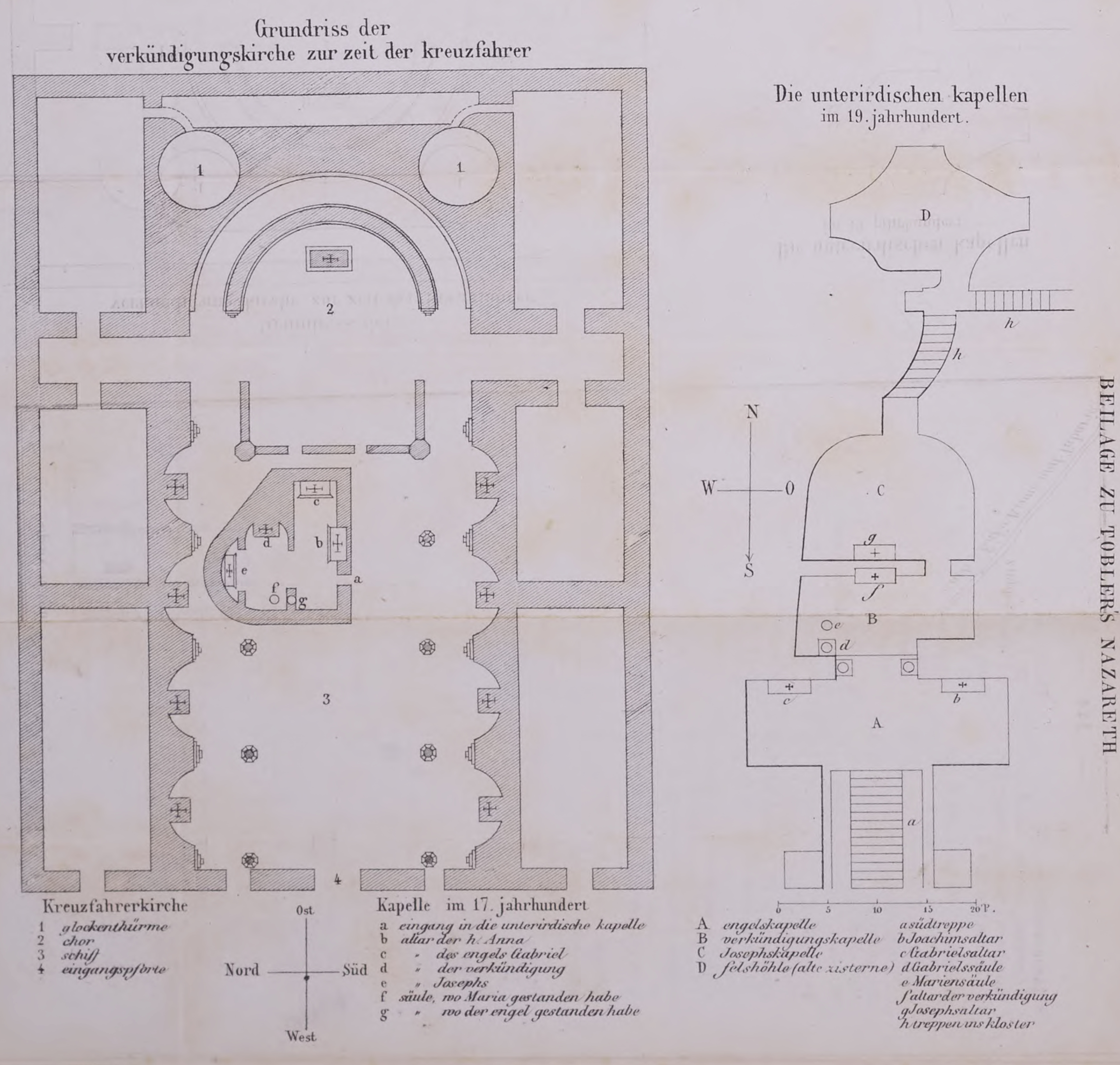
Titus Tobler's 1868 plan of the church as it was in Crusader times

== See also ==
- Basilica della Santa Casa in Loreto, Italy, where a three-wall structure is revered as the Holy House, removed from Nazareth through divine intervention
- List of Brutalist structures

== Bibliography ==
- Emmett, Chad F. (1995). Beyond the basilica : Christians and Muslims in Nazareth. Chicago: University of Chicago Press. ISBN 0-226-20711-0. OCLC 30735259.
- Halevi, Masha. The Politics Behind the Construction of the Modern Church of the Annunciation in Nazareth, The Catholic Historical Review, Volume 96, Number 1, January 2010, pp. 27–55.
- Slyomovics, Susan (2009). "Edward Said's Nazareth". Framework: The Journal of Cinema and Media. 50 (1/2). [Drake Stutesman, Wayne State University Press]: 9–45. doi:10.1353/frm.0.0034. ISSN 0306-7661. JSTOR 41552537.

== Other reading ==
- Official Website of Parish
- Photos of the Church at the Manar al-Athar photo archive
