= Letard I =

Archbishop of Nazareth from 1154 to 1158

Letard I, whom William of Tyre called Attard, was the archbishop of Nazareth in the Kingdom of Jerusalem from 1154 until his death in 1158.

Letard became archbishop after the death of Archbishop Robert I. He attended King Baldwin III and witnessed the king's confirmations and diplomas as well as those of the king's brother Count Amalric. He was present at the synod convoked by the Latin patriarch of Jerusalem, Fulcher of Angoulême, to censure the prior and canons of the Mount of Olives.

After King Baldwin escaped capture by the soldiers of Nur ad-Din in mid-1157, it was decided that he should marry; the High Court of Jerusalem found that the best alliance for the kingdom would be one with the Byzantine Empire. Along with the constable of Jerusalem, Humphrey II of Toron, Letard led a mission to Constantinople with the aim of arranging a union between the king and a member of the Byzantine imperial family. The ambassadors arrived in 1157, but Emperor Manuel I Komnenos kept them waiting for months. The emperor could not commit to help Jerusalem militarily until he had concluded a truce with the Kingdom of Sicily in 1158; after that there were no further obstacles in the negotiations. The mission resulted in the king's marriage to the emperor's niece Theodora Komnene. Letard died in Constantinople, however, and his body was returned to Nazareth for burial in the Nazareth cathedral. He was succeeded as archbishop of Nazareth by Letard II, who had hitherto been the prior of Nazareth.
