= Baldwin III of Jerusalem =

King of Jerusalem from 1143 to 1163

Baldwin III
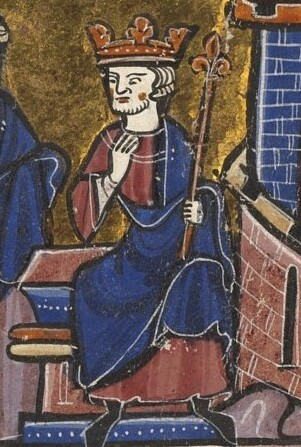

King of Jerusalem
- Reign: 1143 – 1163
- Coronation: 25 December 1143
- Predecessor: Fulk and Melisende
- Successor: Amalric
- Co-ruler: Melisende (until 1152)
- Born: 1130
- Died: 10 February 1163 (aged 32–33); Beirut, then part of Kingdom of Jerusalem
- Burial: Church of the Holy Sepulchre
- Spouse: Theodora Komnene (m. 1158)
- House: Anjou
- Father: Fulk V of Anjou
- Mother: Melisende of Jerusalem

Baldwin III (1130 – 10 February 1163) was the king of Jerusalem from 1143 until his death. Although he only took up sole rule in 1152 and died young, he was the longest-reigning of the 12th-century kings of Jerusalem. He expanded the borders of the kingdom, paved the way for the later kings' attempts to conquer Egypt, and acted as the defender of the other crusader states in the Levant.

Baldwin was the eldest son of Queen Melisende and King Fulk. Melisende's father, King Baldwin II, conferred the Kingdom of Jerusalem on the young Baldwin and his parents in 1131, but Baldwin III was only crowned after the death of his father in 1143. Baldwin initially reigned alongside his mother, who was the true ruler of the kingdom. He attempted to assert himself in warfare even before reaching the age of majority at 15, but after an initial military success in quelling a popular rebellion at Wadi Musa in 1144, he suffered a defeat in the Hauran and participated in the Second Crusade's failed attempt to capture Damascus in 1148.

Baldwin took on the traditional responsibility of the kings of Jerusalem to look after the Principality of Antioch and the counties of Edessa and Tripoli. In 1149 he intervened in Antioch after the death of its prince, Raymond of Poitiers, and in 1150 arranged the sale of the last of the Edessan fortresses to the Byzantine Empire. His relationship with his mother soured as he strived for a greater role in the government and she sought to marginalize him. Matters came to a head in April 1152, when he deposed her in a swift military action. He was soon called on to settle the affairs of the County of Tripoli after the assassination of Count Raymond II.

In 1153, Baldwin conquered the vital city of Ascalon and welcomed the marriage of his cousin Constance, widow of Prince Raymond, to Raynald of Châtillon. After nearly being killed or captured in a battle against the Aleppan ruler Nur ad-Din in 1157, he established an alliance with Emperor Manuel I Komnenos and married the emperor's niece Theodora. Baldwin and Manuel developed a close relationship, marred only by the latter's failure in the early 1160s to marry Baldwin's cousin, Melisende of Tripoli. Baldwin took up rule in Antioch once more in 1161 after Turkic forces captured Raynald. Baldwin died of an illness in 1163, having produced no children with Theodora, and was succeeded by his brother, Amalric.

== Childhood ==
Baldwin was born in the first half of 1130, or in August at the latest. His mother, Melisende, was the eldest daughter and designated heir of King Baldwin II of Jerusalem. His father, Fulk, had been the count of Anjou until he left France to marry Melisende. Fulk had grown children from his first marriage in France, including Geoffrey, who succeeded him as count of Anjou. At the time of his birth, Baldwin's parents held the cities of Acre and Tyre.

The Kingdom of Jerusalem was one of four crusader states established in the Levant by the Franks, the Latin Christians who conquered the region from its Muslim rulers during the First Crusade in 1098–99. The other states were dependent on the kingdom to a varying degree: Baldwin I established suzerainty over the counties of Edessa and Tripoli, while Baldwin II was invited by the nobles of the Principality of Antioch to take up rule in the name of his granddaughter, Princess Constance, after her father Bohemond II was killed in battle.

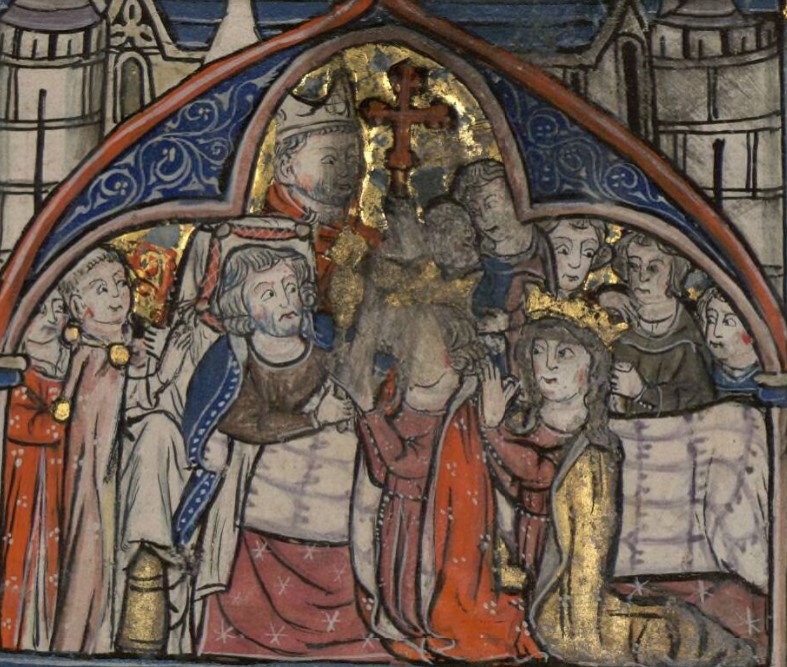
On his deathbed, Baldwin II conferred the kingdom on Fulk, Melisende, and Baldwin III.

In August 1131, King Baldwin II fell ill. He summoned the young Baldwin and his parents to the house of the Latin patriarch of Jerusalem, and proceeded to confer the kingdom on the three of them. He died on 21 August; Baldwin's parents were crowned on 14 September. Fulk too was invited by the Antiochene nobles to rule in Constance's name, and he in turn invited Raymond of Poitiers to marry Constance and take up the government of the principality. At this time, in the early 1130s, Baldwin's parents became estranged because of Fulk's attempts to exclude Melisende from power; they had reconciled by 1135, when Baldwin's brother, Amalric, was born. They started associating Baldwin in their acts in 1138, but chose not to have him crowned. According to the chronicler William of Tyre, Baldwin was curious, well-educated, and exceptionally intelligent. He became pious and well-versed in history and law.

Baldwin's close family and relationship with Frankish leaders in his lifetime

Gabriel of Melitene	Hugh I of Rethel	Melisende of Montlhéry	Isabella of Montlhéry
Morphia of Melitene	Baldwin II of Jerusalem	Hodierna of Rethel	Joscelin I of Edessa
Eremburga of Maine	Fulk V of Anjou	Melisende of Jerusalem	Alice of Jerusalem m. Bohemond II of Antioch	Hodierna of Jerusalem m. Raymond II of Tripoli	Ioveta of Jerusalem	Manasses of Hierges m. Helvis of Ramla	Joscelin II of Edessa m. Beatrice of Saone
Geoffrey V of Anjou m. Matilda of England	Sibylla of Anjou m. Thierry of Flanders	Baldwin III of Jerusalem m. Theodora Komnene	Amalric of Jerusalem m. Agnes of Courtenay	Constance of Antioch m. (1) Raymond of Poitiers (2) Raynald of Châtillon	Raymond III of Tripoli	Melisende of Tripoli	Joscelin of Courtenay	Agnes of Courtenay
Henry II of England	Philip I of Flanders	Sibylla of Jerusalem	Baldwin IV of Jerusalem	Bohemond III of Antioch	Maria of Antioch m. Manuel I Komnenos

== Co-reign ==
=== Accession ===
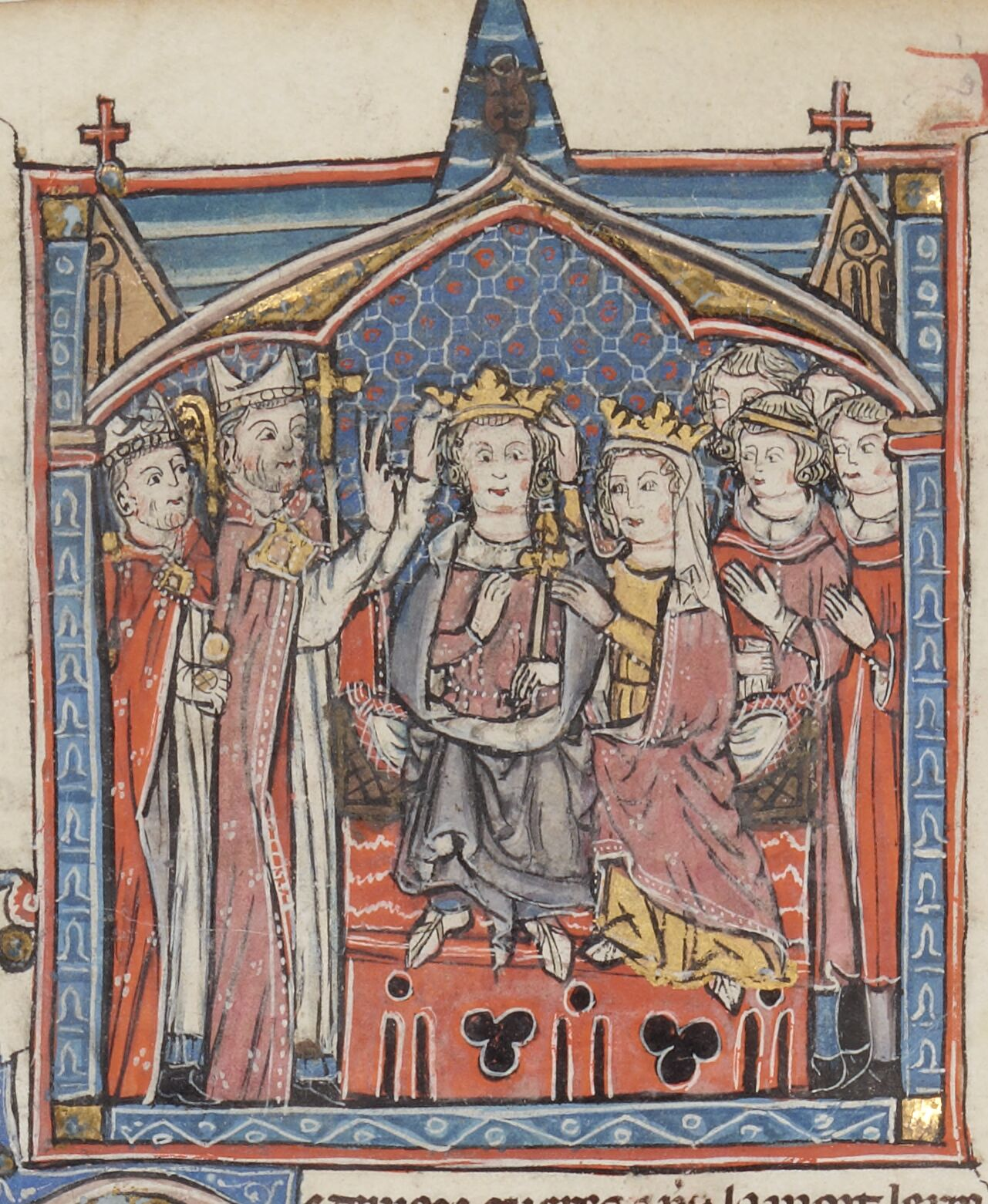
Baldwin III was crowned together with his mother after his father died, but it was she who took up power.

King Fulk died in a hunting accident on 10 November 1143, and Queen Melisende swiftly seized power. No royal election was held because the joint reign initiated in 1131 continued with Melisende and Baldwin III. The patriarch of Jerusalem, William of Messines, consecrated and anointed Baldwin as king and crowned him together with Melisende on Christmas Day. The coronation did not change much in Baldwin's life; because he was only 13 at the time, his mother became his guardian. Although she is often described as having ruled as regent in Baldwin's name, neither she nor William of Tyre understood her authority in those terms. William explicitly presented her rule as grounded in hereditary right, and the historian Bernard Hamilton has argued that she should be considered a queen regnant.

In 1144, Baldwin issued a charter without reference to Melisende. From that point on, however, all charters were issued in both of their names. This led the historian Hans E. Mayer to suggest that Melisende prohibited the issuance of any charters solely in her son's name. Because a woman could not command the army, the queen appointed her recently arrived cousin Manasses of Hierges to serve as constable. To uphold her authority, she cultivated a core group of loyal men, with Manasses at its forefront. Her inner circle also included Philip of Milly, lord of Nablus, Elinand of Tiberias, prince of Galilee, and Rohard the Elder, viscount of Jerusalem. Their support enabled Melisende to anchor her authority in the capital as well as the strategically vital regions of Samaria and Galilee, which included portions of the royal domain.

=== Initial war experiences ===
==== Wadi Musa ====
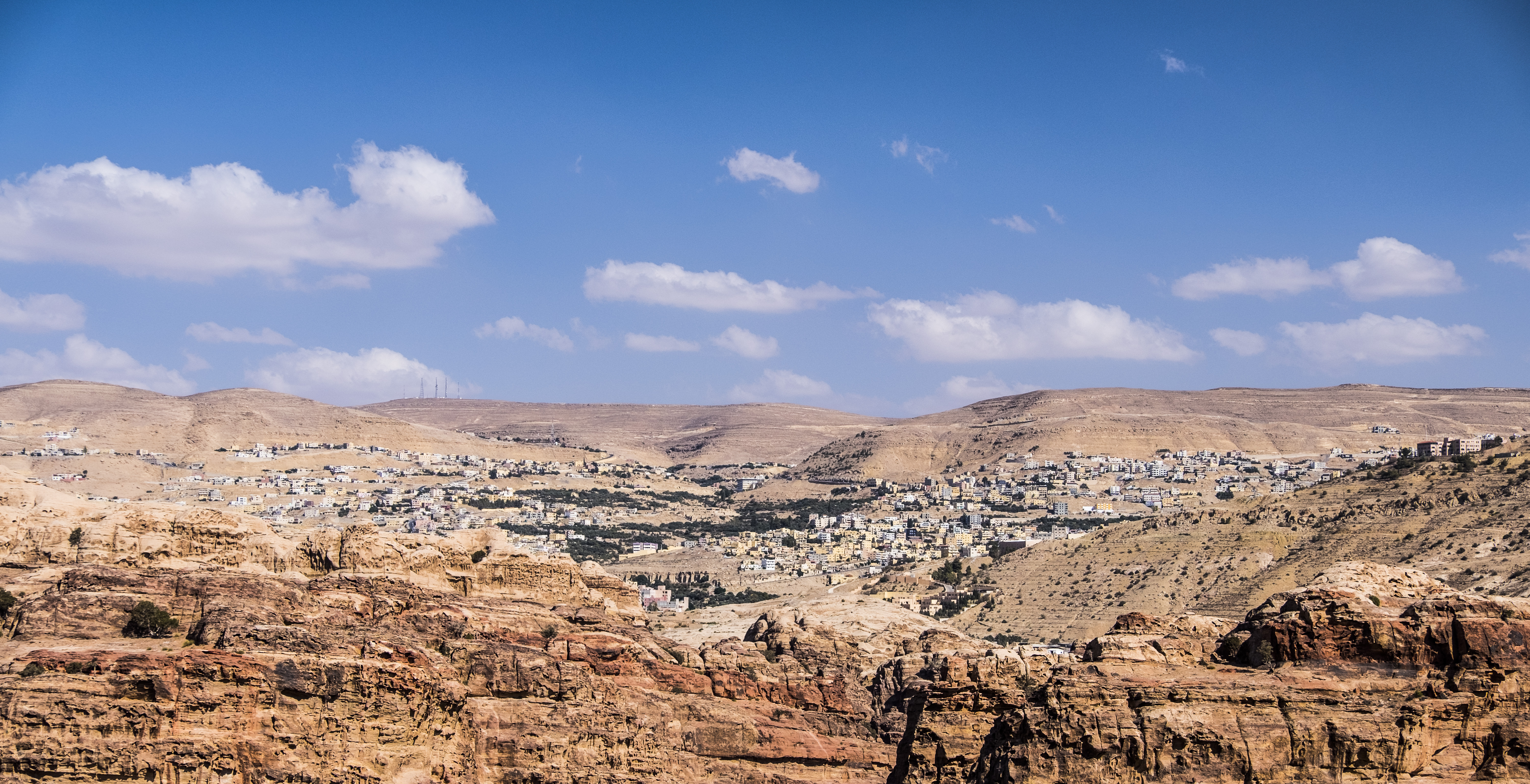
At 14, Baldwin won his first military success at Wadi Musa—after which his mother took steps to prevent a second.

Warfare offered Baldwin III one clear advantage over his mother. As a medieval monarch—and particularly as a king of Jerusalem—he was expected to embody military prowess. In 1144, the native population in Wadi Musa rebelled and called in Muslim forces, which seized the eponymous fortress. Although Baldwin was still a minor, he decided to act. Because the stronghold was too well-defended to storm directly, he cut down the olive trees that were the inhabitants' main source of livelihood and offered pardons. The people of Wadi Musa accepted his rule and dismissed their Muslim allies. Baldwin turned 14 in 1144, and this was his first military success.

When Edessa came under siege by Zengid forces later in 1144, however, Baldwin was not called upon. The appeal for help from the Edessenes was addressed to him, but it was his mother who responded. She called a council and dispatched her key supporters—Manasses of Hierges, Philip of Nablus, and Elinard of Tiberias—with an army without involving Baldwin. Melisende apparently resented her son's success at Wadi Musa, and in the interest of preserving her own power, aimed to prevent him from building a public image as a successful military leader. The army did not reach Edessa in time: the city fell to the Turks, who killed its Frankish inhabitants. Baldwin came of age in 1145. The occasion was not publicly celebrated and, like his coronation, brought no real change in his fortunes.

==== Hauran ====
In early 1147, Altuntash—governor of Bosra and Salkhad in the Hauran—attempted to secede from the authority of the Damascene ruler Mu'in ad-Din Unur. He approached the Franks with a proposal: he would surrender his towns to them in return for their support and a lordship in the Hauran. Melisende presented the offer to her council. Though Unur was an ally, the proposal was tempting. The Hauran was home to a largely Christian population, and gaining a foothold there would expose Damascus to strategic pressure. An army was assembled at Tiberias, and the government notified Unur of the plan to reinstate Altuntash. Unur objected and promised compensation for the kingdom's expenses if the operation was called off. Melisende dispatched a knight, Bernard Vacher, to Damascus, instructing him to clarify that the army would only accompany Altuntash to Bosra and not attack Damascene lands. Unur persuaded Bernard that the campaign should be abandoned. Bernard then convinced Baldwin, and the council reversed its earlier decision. Many within the army, driven by hopes of plunder, protested the change in course. Under their pressure, Baldwin decided to march.

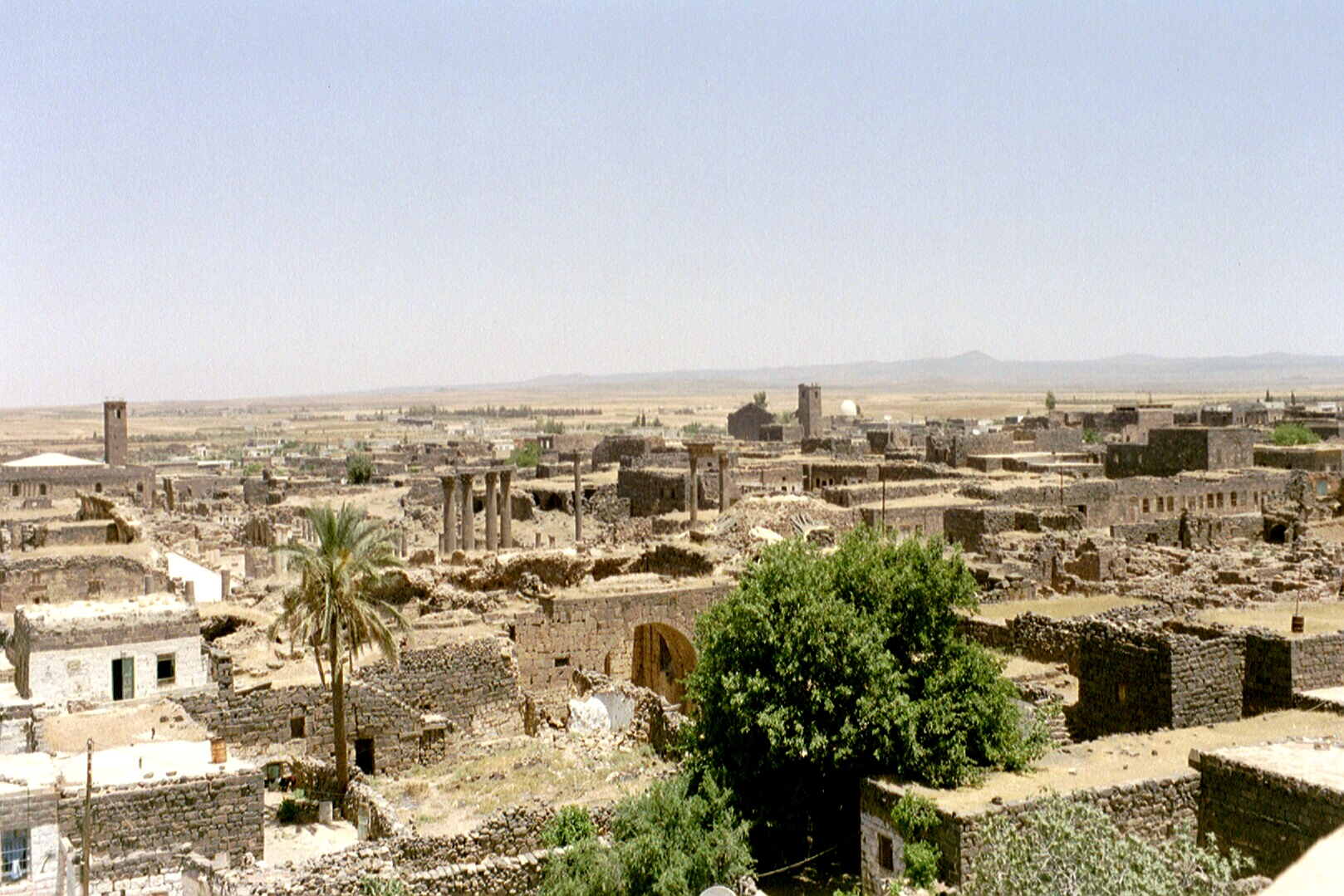
Baldwin sought control over the Hauran by installing an ally in Bosra, but the latter's wife foiled their plan.

The Hauran expedition was fraught with danger from the outset because Bosra was farther east than any other holding of the kingdom. Baldwin and his army crossed the mountains and descended into a plain west of Daraa near the Yarmuk River. They were immediately encircled by Turkish forces in far greater numbers than anticipated—a development likely triggered by the arrival of Nur ad-Din Zengi on 27 May, who was summoned by Unur after Baldwin's earlier warning. Progress slowed and water grew scarce; when they reached sight of Bosra, Baldwin and his men discovered that Altuntash's wife had already handed it over to the Turks.

As Baldwin and his army withdrew, the Turks set fire to surrounding crops and brush, compounding the army's hardship. Baldwin was reportedly offered a chance to flee on the swiftest horse in the army, belonging to his vassal John Gotman. He refused, likely recognizing that abandoning his army would irreparably damage his reputation. William of Tyre attributes the army's survival to divine intervention: first, when Archbishop Robert I of Nazareth raised the True Cross, miraculously reversing the wind and halting the spread of fire; and again when a mysterious knight on a white horse, bearing a red banner, appeared to lead the men to safety—imagery clearly echoing tales from the First Crusade. Unur, however, deliberately held back the Muslim forces from pursuing the retreating Franks. According to the chronicler Ibn al-Qalanisi, Unur feared that an overly aggressive assault might provoke retaliation, and he was still wary of letting Nur ad-Din grow too dominant—preserving, if only as a contingency, the possibility of renewing his alliance with Baldwin. According to Mayer, Melisende pinned the blame for this failure on Baldwin and used it to undermine him: in a subsequent charter, she included Amalric on the same footing as Baldwin.

=== Second Crusade ===
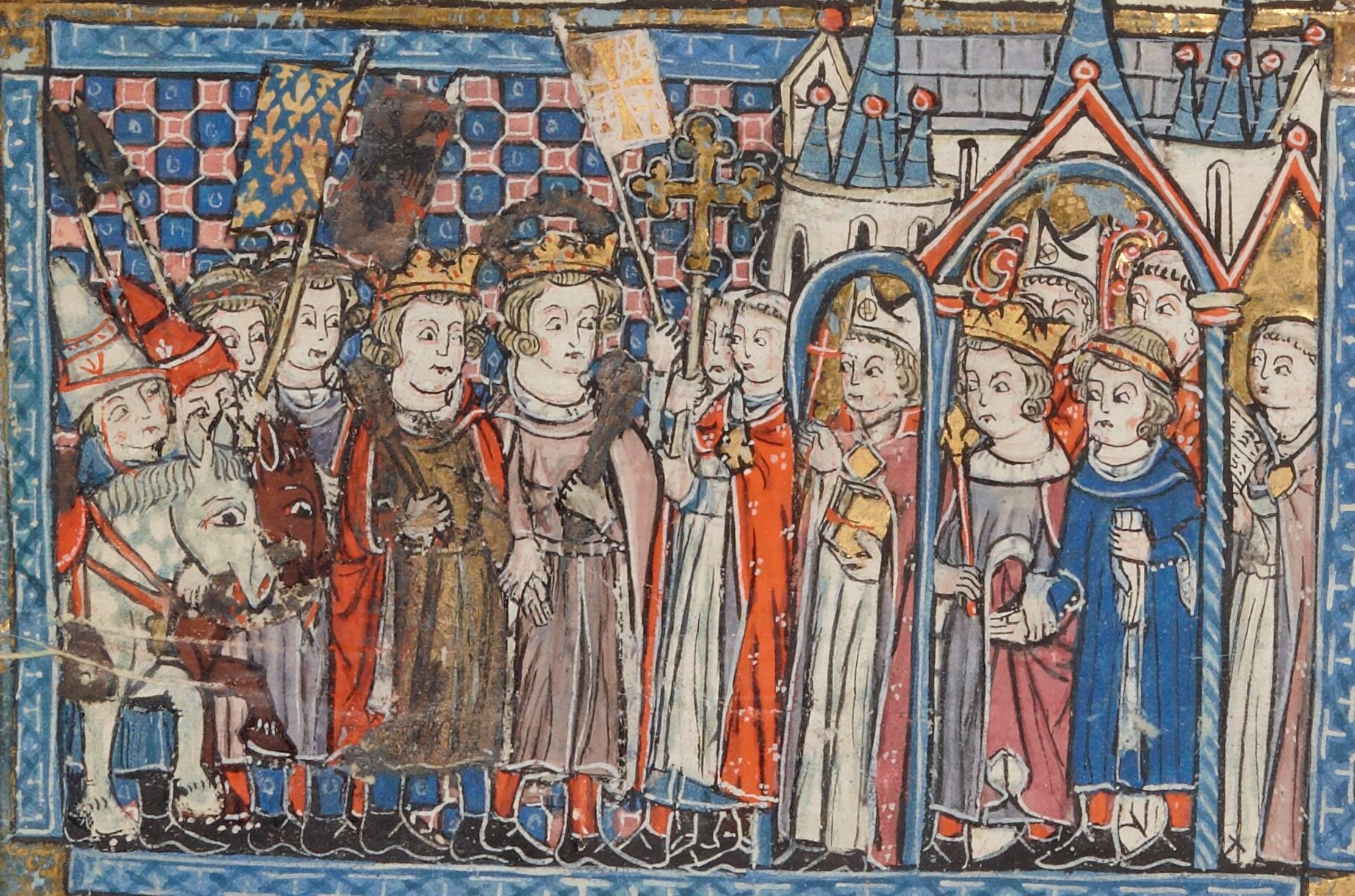
Baldwin welcomed two kings at the Council of Acre–but had already reached a decision with one of them.

The Western Christian world was horrified by the news of the fall of Edessa. At the urging of Pope Eugene III, the ruling elites of France and Germany took the cross and set out for the Levant in the company of papal legates. The Germans, led by King Conrad III, arrived first; Baldwin, the Knights Templar, and the new patriarch, Fulcher of Angoulême, met with Conrad in April 1148. They decided that the crusaders should set out to conquer Damascus rather than retake Edessa, which was rumored to have been so badly destroyed that defending it would be impossible if it were restored to Christian rule. The conquest of Damascus, on the other hand, would serve the interest of Jerusalem much better. Mayer concludes that, while the queen might have opposed attacking an ally, Baldwin wished to gain the upper hand over Melisende if Damascus were to be conquered under his co-leadership. The French contingent, led by King Louis VII and including nobles such as Baldwin's brother-in-law Count Thierry of Flanders, arrived in June. Fulcher, Baldwin, and Melisende greeted the assembled crusaders at Palmarea near Acre on 24 June, and the decision to attack Damascus was formally taken.

The siege of Damascus began with early success. The crusaders advanced through Banyas and Mount Lebanon before descending into the plain near Darayya. There, they pushed into orchards irrigated by the Barada, where Baldwin led the vanguard. Fighting through mud walls and narrow paths, the crusaders took control of the river. Within the city, panic spread, and citizens erected street barricades to delay an apparently imminent breach. However, the momentum abruptly shifted, whether, as William claims, through betrayal and false advice or, as Ibn al-Qalanisi suggests, in response to logistical pressures. The kings abandoned their strong position and relocated to the south and southeast, supposedly where the defenses were weaker. However, the new ground offered little water or provisions, and any return to their earlier position was soon cut off by enemy forces. Muslim reinforcements poured in, and the crusaders found themselves trapped; their temporary defenses were under constant attack and unable to break out. As reports of a larger Islamic force approaching circulated, fear overtook the crusaders, and the campaign turned from siege to survival. The army withdrew in disorder under relentless fire in an ignominious defeat for the Christians.

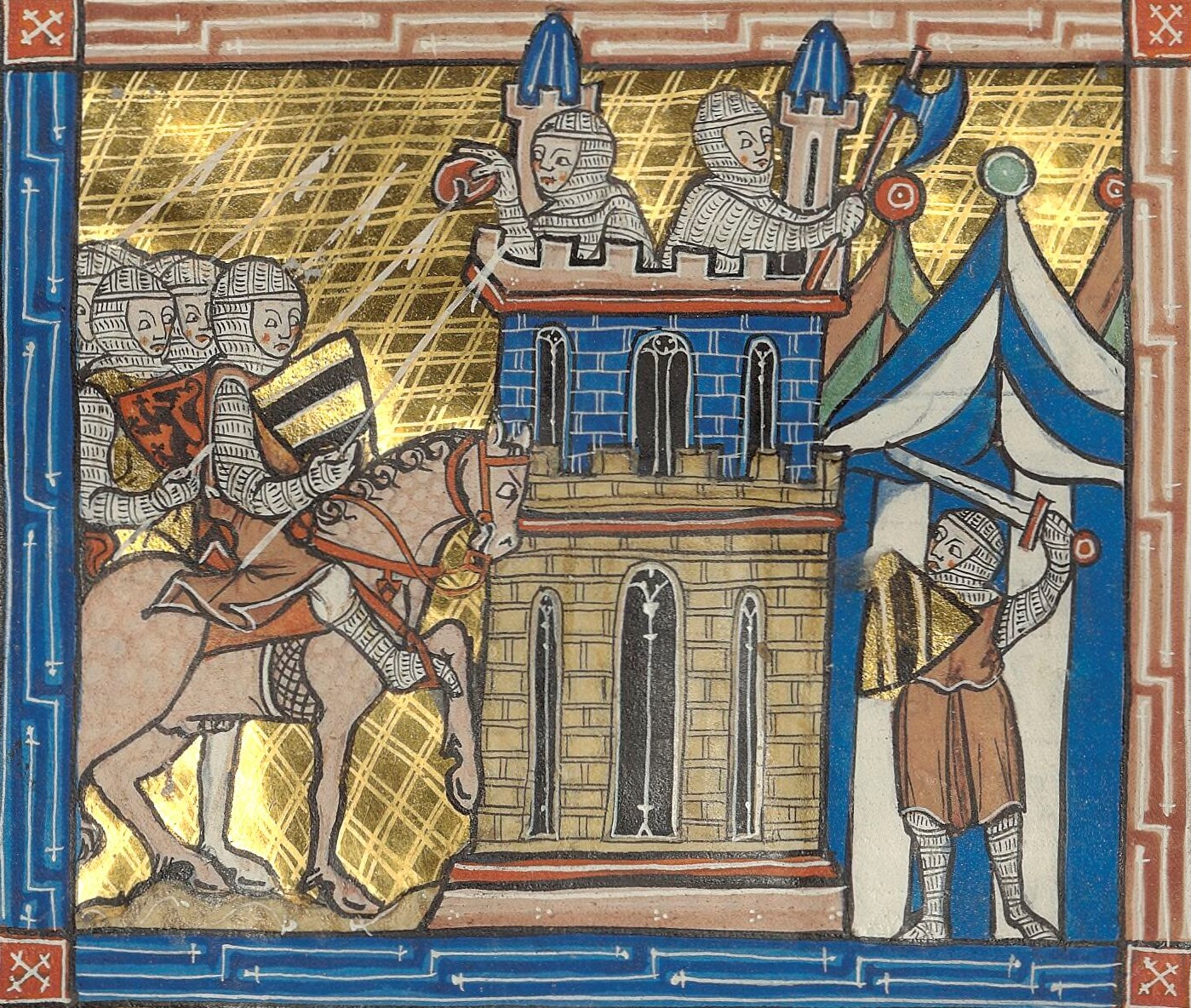
Some sources saw the defeat at Damascus as treachery, implicating Baldwin and other crusaders.

Rumors of betrayal led to speculation over who was to blame, and among the various theories, one implicated Baldwin III. According to Patriarch Michael the Syrian, the Damascenes secretly warned Baldwin that if Damascus fell, Conrad might claim Jerusalem for himself. They allegedly offered Baldwin 200,000 dinars to withdraw, and he accepted—only to discover later that the coins were worthless, gold-plated copper. The historian Malcolm Barber gives no credence neither to this theory nor to others, which variously implicate the Templars, Thierry of Flanders, and Raymond of Antioch. Melisende capitalized on Baldwin's setback by reducing his status in royal documents: in 1149, she started issuing charters in her name alone and merely allowed him to consent.

In 1149, Baldwin was presented with a new opportunity to win glory. Following the battle of Inab on 29 June, where Prince Raymond and many of his knights were killed a significant victory for Nur ad-Din, the king hastily marched north with his troops and laid an unsuccessful siege to Ḥarim. He also sent his vassal Humphrey II of Toron to reinforce Azaz with sixty knights, but despite these efforts, his reputation as a military commander saw little improvement. More significant than the military outcome, however, was Baldwin's assumption of the traditional responsibility of the kings of Jerusalem in times of crisis. At the invitation of the local barons, he took up the regency of Antioch, following in the footsteps of his father and grandfather. By stepping in to defend Antioch and the remnants of Edessa, Baldwin was fulfilling a traditional obligation of the kings of Jerusalem. His time in the principality was brief, and he left Antioch in the care of its patriarch, Aimery of Limoges; William of Tyre notes that affairs in the kingdom demanded the king's return. Baldwin decided to counteract the Christian losses in the northern Levant by pressing the southern frontier with Egypt, where the power of the Fatimid caliphs was disentegrating: by early 1150, he was engaged in rebuilding Gaza in southern Palestine.

=== Estrangement from mother ===
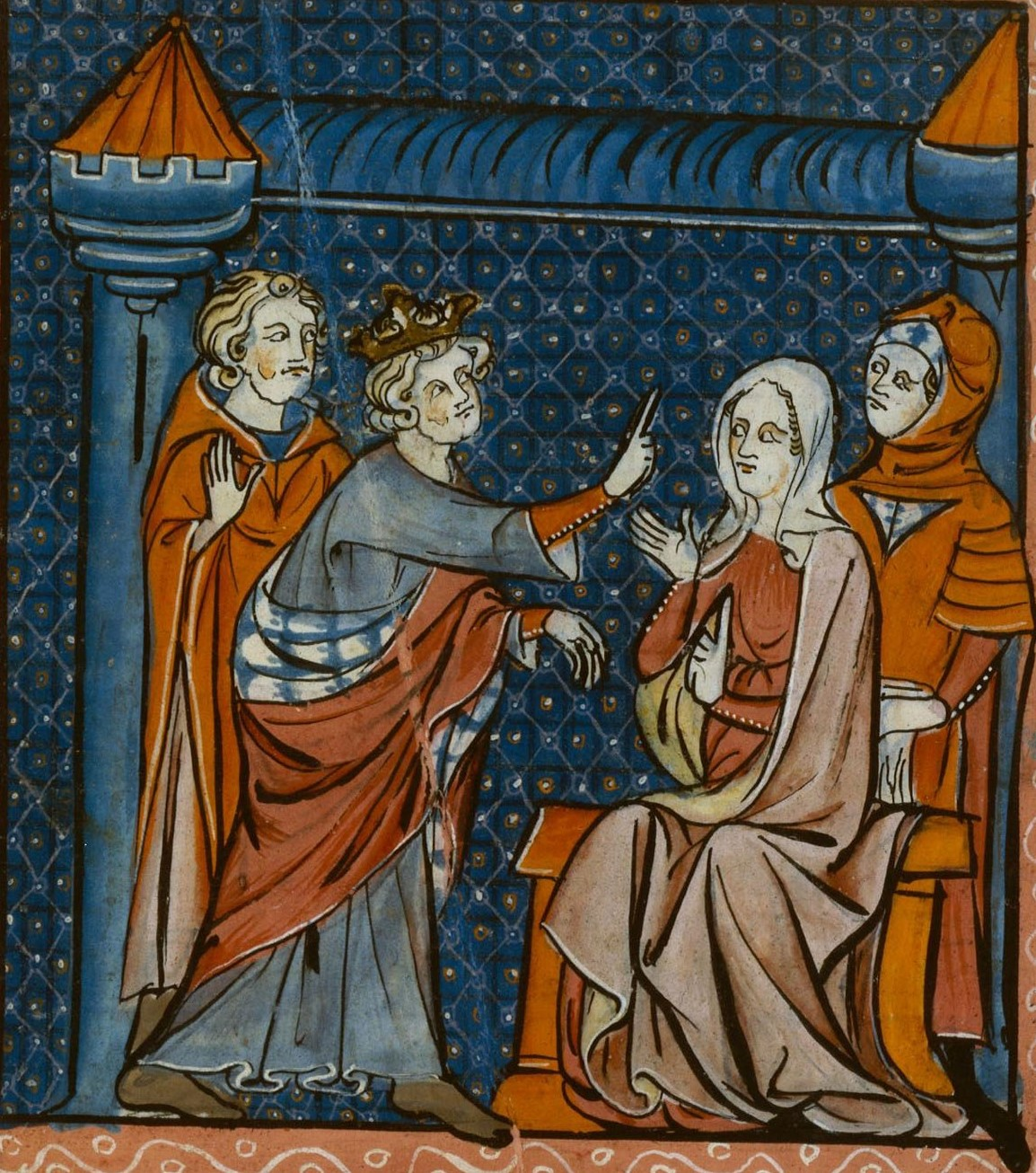
From 1149, Baldwin's relationship with his mother gradually collapsed and a power struggle ensued.

A rift between Melisende and Baldwin became apparent in 1149. Having become embroiled in a conflict with the Church over her desire to see her chancellor, Ralph the Englishman, raised to the archbishopric of Tyre, the queen apparently decided that Church support was crucial and either dismissed Ralph from the chancery or forced him to resign. Because she could not appoint a successor to Ralph without Baldwin's consent, which Mayer considers unlikely to have been given, the chancery collapsed. Thereafter, the monarchs issued their documents each through their own scribe, maintaining the appearance of a unified kingdom whilst formalizing an unprecedented split in royal authority.

Because Melisende had firmly entrenched herself in the southern and inland parts of the kingdom, Baldwin could only hope to establish control over the royal domain on the northern part of the coast, namely the cities of Acre and Tyre. Melisende intervened there as well, however, granting land to the Knights Hospitaller in 1149. Baldwin consented; Mayer believes that he had to in order to retain the Hospitallers' neutrality. In early 1150, he responded in kind when he fortified the ancient city of Gaza in Melisende's zone of influence. Like all of his predecessors, Baldwin was preoccupied with neutralizing the constant threat emanating from the Egyptian-held town of Ascalon, just north of Gaza, and he aimed to encircle it. Mayer credits the patriarch, who accompanied Baldwin to Gaza, with the compromise suggestion to entrust the rebuilt city to the Templars, who were neutral in the brewing conflict between the monarchs. In June 1150, the king went a step further in widening their rift: he completely stopped mentioning his mother in his documents while she still superficially acknowledged him.

Baldwin's entourage in 1150 was few. He was attended by his chapel: Ralph, the dismissed chancellor and unconsecrated archbishop of Tyre; Simon, a claimant to the Principality of Galilee; Hugh of Bethsan, a relatively unimportant Templar knight; and Clarembald, the viscount of Acre. Clarembald's support was the only one of significance because it meant that the king had full control of the lucrative coastal city. The rest of the Church and baronage stood with Melisende. That year, she secured the lordships of Mirabel and Ramla for Manasses, her cousin and constable, by arranging for him to marry Helvis of Ramla. William of Tyre relates that Manasses' "insolent attitude of superiority toward the elders of the realm" caused him to be loathed by the noble, and Baldwin himself held Manasses responsible for driving a wedge between him and his mother.

=== Disposal of Edessa ===
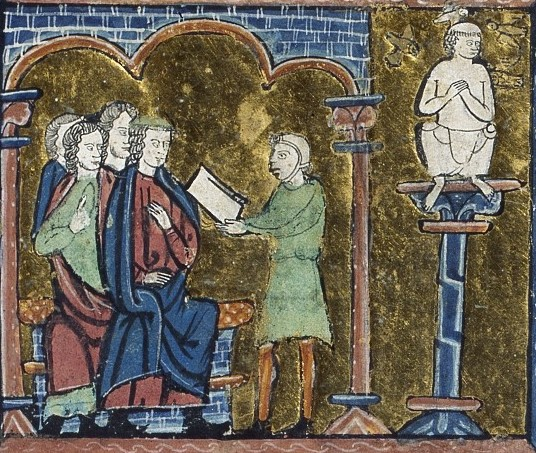
Told by a messenger of Joscelin's capture, Baldwin marched north despite his mother's manoeuvers.

In May 1150, while the reconstruction of Gaza was still underway, news reached the kingdom of the capture of Count Joscelin II of Edessa by Nur ad-Din's troops. Mesud I, sultan of Rum, seized the opportunity to capture the outlying possessions of Joscelin's county. King Baldwin returned to Jerusalem and summoned the army with the intent of again marching north, but the vassals loyal to his mother did not respond. Unusually, he resorted to summoning them individually, but they still refused. Mayer concludes that the queen did not approve of the expedition and wished to prevent Baldwin from gaining a reputation as a political leader in the northern crusader states. Baldwin went anyway, that being his duty, accompanied by Humphrey II, lord of Toron, Guy I Brisebarre, lord of Beirut, and the army of Tripoli.

Upon arrival in Antioch, Baldwin found that Mesud had gone, but Nur ad-Din had encircled the entire region of Turbessel. Emperor Manuel I Komnenos offered an annual income for Countess Beatrice and her family in return for the cession of the six remaining fortresses of the County of Edessa: Turbessel, Ravendan, Aintab, Duluk, Bira, and Samosata. Baldwin convinced the northern nobles that the fortresses could not be held against the Turks and that the Byzantine proposal should be accepted. In this bargain, Mayer sees the first emergence of the young king's political foresight and diplomatic ability: by selling the indefensible fortresses to the Byzantines, he ensured that the blame for their inevitable capture by the Turks would fall on Emperor Manuel I Komnenos rather than on himself. The Byzantines lost the fortresses within a few months, and they were divided among the Seljuks of Rum, the Artuqids, and the Zengids.

After conferring with the nobles in Antioch, Baldwin and Count Raymond II of Tripoli went to Turbessel to install a Byzantine garrison in the fortress and escort the Christians to safety. Nur ad-Din harassed them on their way to Aintab, where Humphrey II of Toron and the Antiochene nobleman Robert II of Sourdeval expressed confidence that they would be able to hold it if it were granted to one of them. Baldwin refused to renege on his agreement with the emperor and had the Byzantines installed in Aintab as well. They then continued their march, with the king leading the vanguard and the lord of Toron and count of Tripoli safeguarding the rear, until they reached Christian territory. William of Tyre reports that they were plagued by dust, thirst, and the August heat. Baldwin then returned to Antioch.

=== Civil war ===
In June 1151, Baldwin campaigned against Nur ad-Din in the Hauran. In July, a 70-ship fleet from Egypt targeted Jaffa, Acre, Sidon, Beirut, and Tripoli; Mayer presumes that the king was involved in the defense of these areas. That same year, Melisende consolidated her position in the south, where Baldwin had started to interfere, by naming her younger son, Amalric, count of Jaffa. Mayer surmises that Baldwin did not approve of this and that, in dissolving the chancery and cultivating her own vassalry, the queen was splitting the kingdom while avoiding a formal division. According to Mayer, Baldwin may have feared that his mother would set up his younger brother as an anti-king.

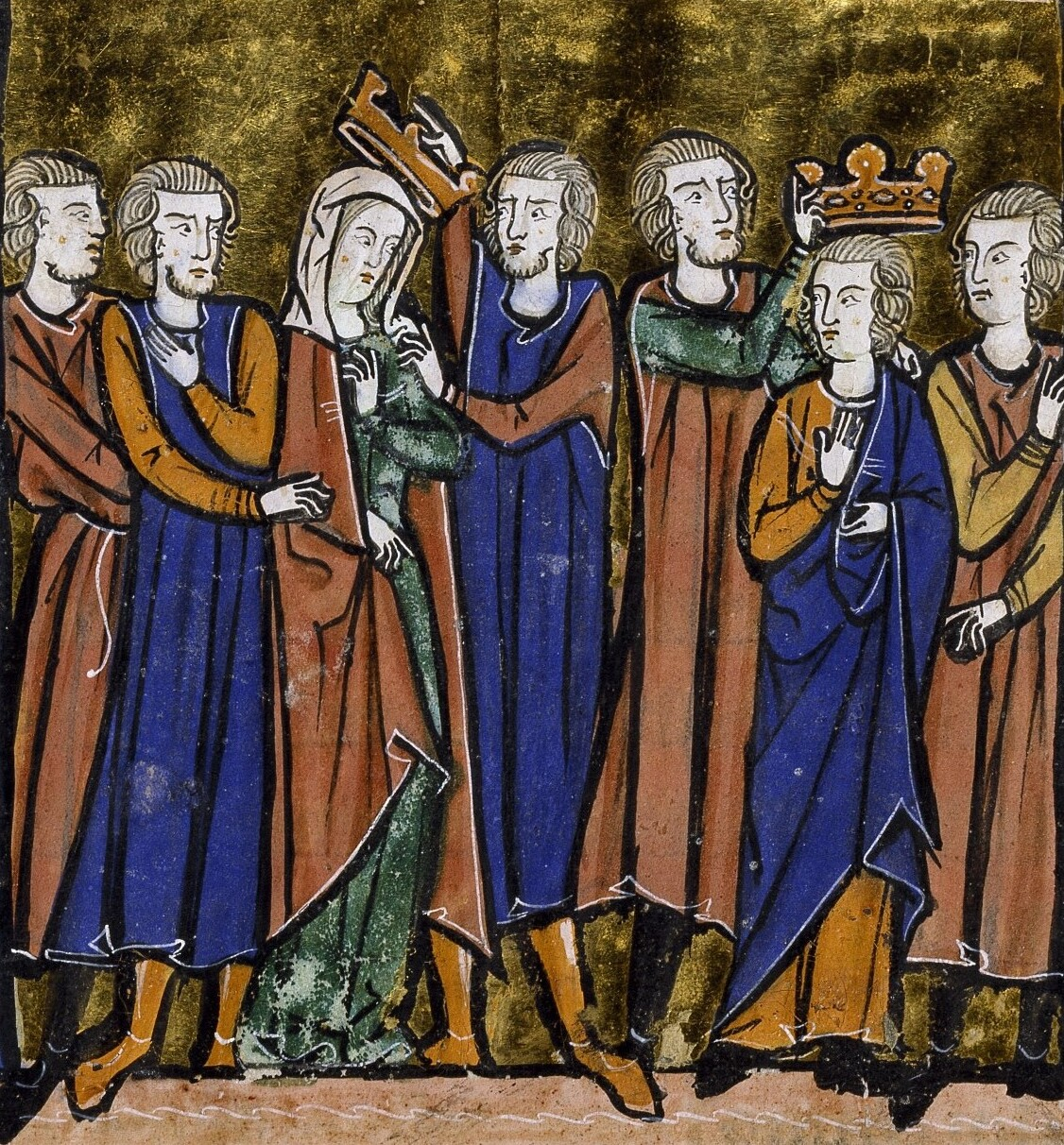
Refused a coronation without his mother, Baldwin started a war that swiftly decided their fates.

Baldwin took decisive action in early 1152. He demanded from the patriarch, Fulcher, a confirmatory coronation on Easter that would involve crowning only him and not also his mother. This would, in the eyes of the multitudes gathered in the Holy Sepulchre for Easter, signify the end of the co-reign and the start of Baldwin's sole reign, blessed by the Church. The Church supported Melisende, but the patriarch could not outright deny the king's request. He therefore pleaded with Baldwin to agree to another joint coronation. This would have been counter-productive to Baldwin, so he resorted to deception: he requested that the patriarch crown neither him nor the queen, but the day after Easter staged a solemn procession wearing a laurel wreath in Jerusalem, the center of his mother's zone of influence.

Baldwin's Easter demonstration was so severe that the High Court convened to discuss the matter. Baldwin demanded from his mother a formal division of the kingdom and a share of inheritance from his grandfather. Melisende argued that the whole kingdom belonged to her by hereditary right, but agreed to cede a half to Baldwin, thereby painting him as the troublemaker. According to William, Baldwin was allowed to choose his share in the partition, and he chose Acre and Tyre; Mayer notes that he could not have chosen anything else because this was the only area where he exercised control. Hamilton considers Baldwin's request "criminally irresponsible" because the kingdom was too small to survive a division, while Mayer argues that the High Court merely ratified the state of affairs that had been in place since 1150.

The division of the kingdom, imposed by Baldwin over his mother's objections, was brief. After publicly revealing her vulnerability, he moved quickly. He appointed Humphrey of Toron to serve as his constable and then proclaimed that one half of the kingdom would not suffice for a king. He assembled a force and besieged Manasses at Mirabel, forcing him to surrender and leave the Latin East forever. He then proceeded to occupy the unfortified town of Nablus, where his mother had fled, and pursued her to Jerusalem. Her barons deserted her, leaving her only with her core supporters, such as her son Amalric, Rohard the Elder, and Philip of Nablus. They retired with the queen to the citadel in the Tower of David. Patriarch Fulcher at this point emerged in support of the queen: accompanied by his clergy, he went to meet Baldwin outside of the city and implored that he respect the agreement with his mother. Baldwin refused, and Fulcher threatened him with being shunned by the Church before angrily returning to the city. After the citizens sided with Baldwin and opened their gates to him, he attacked the Tower of David with ballistae, bows, and mangonels. The battle lasted several days as the besieged defended themselves valiantly; a settlement was then negotiated by which the queen would cede Jerusalem to Baldwin and retire to Nablus, while Baldwin swore an oath not to disturb her in that town.

== Sole reign ==
=== Consolidation ===
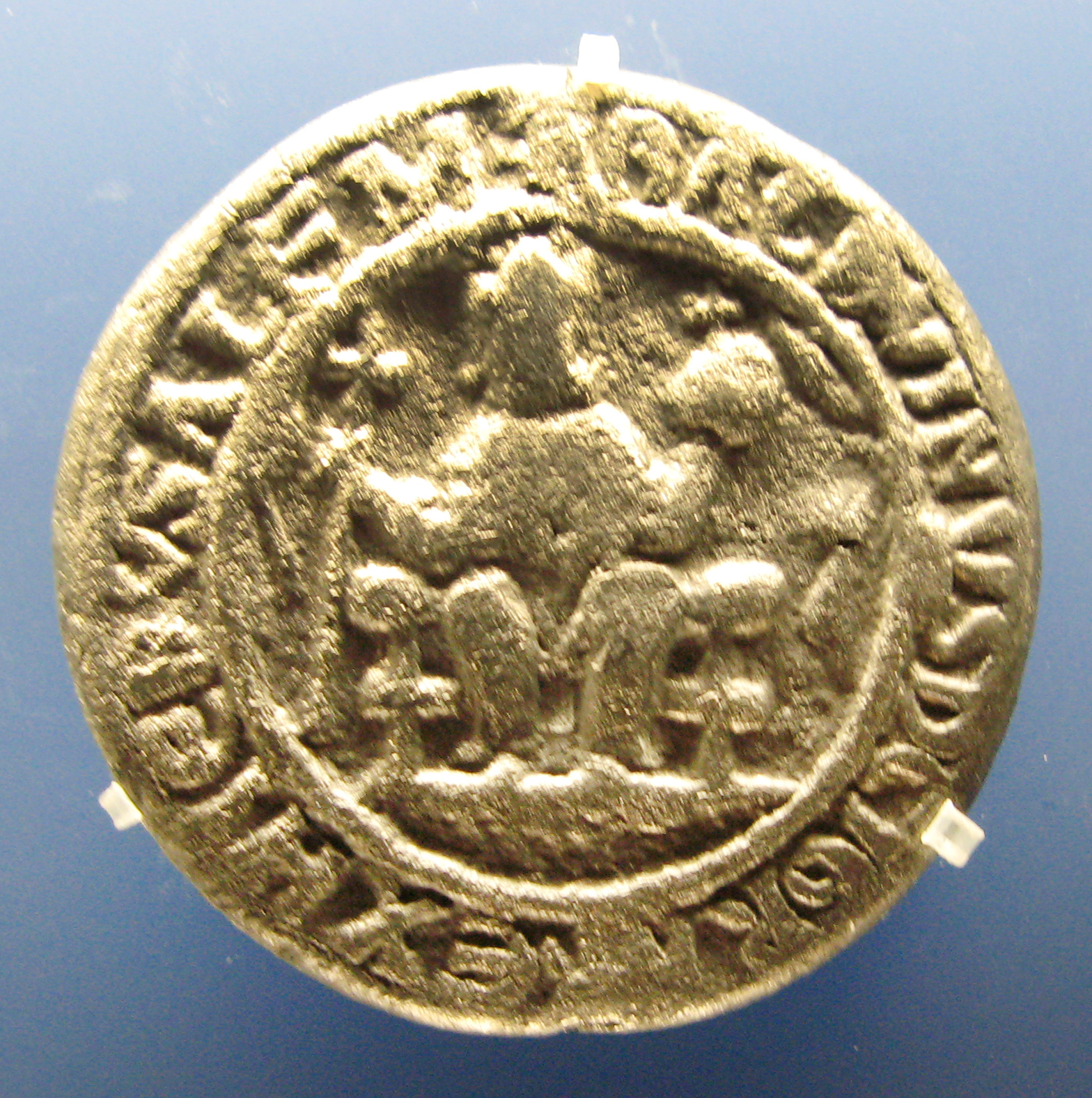
Baldwin, shown here on his lead seal enthroned and holding a sceptre and an orb, took time to assert himself.

Baldwin had grown to be a tall, strong, ruddy man with a thick, fair beard. By 20 April 1152, he had finally become the master of Jerusalem. Like his mother before him, Baldwin began his sole rule by distributing the government offices among his trusted partisans, restoring the chancery under Ralph and appointing a new viscount of Jerusalem, Paganus de Voh. Mayer infers that Baldwin and Melisende despised each other in the aftermath of their conflict, but maintained the appearance of familial harmony: in all her subsequent acts, Melisende mentioned the consent of her "beloved son", while Baldwin honored her and allowed her to advise him. By refraining from publicly disgracing his mother, the king reduced the risk of provoking her into open defiance.

According to William of Tyre, Baldwin was affable and quick-witted, unreserved in his criticism of others but also able to take criticism. The great barons–including his former enemy, Philip of Nablus–embraced him after Melisende's defeat. The Church, personified by Archbishops Peter of Tyre and Baldwin II of Caesarea, decided to do the same, and throughout his reign, Baldwin respected the rights of the Church. While he took in most of Melisende's former supporters, Baldwin did exact vengeance on some. He shunned Patriarch Fulcher, Archbishop Robert I of Nazareth, and Bishop Gerald of Bethlehem; he also revoked Jaffa from his brother, Amalric.

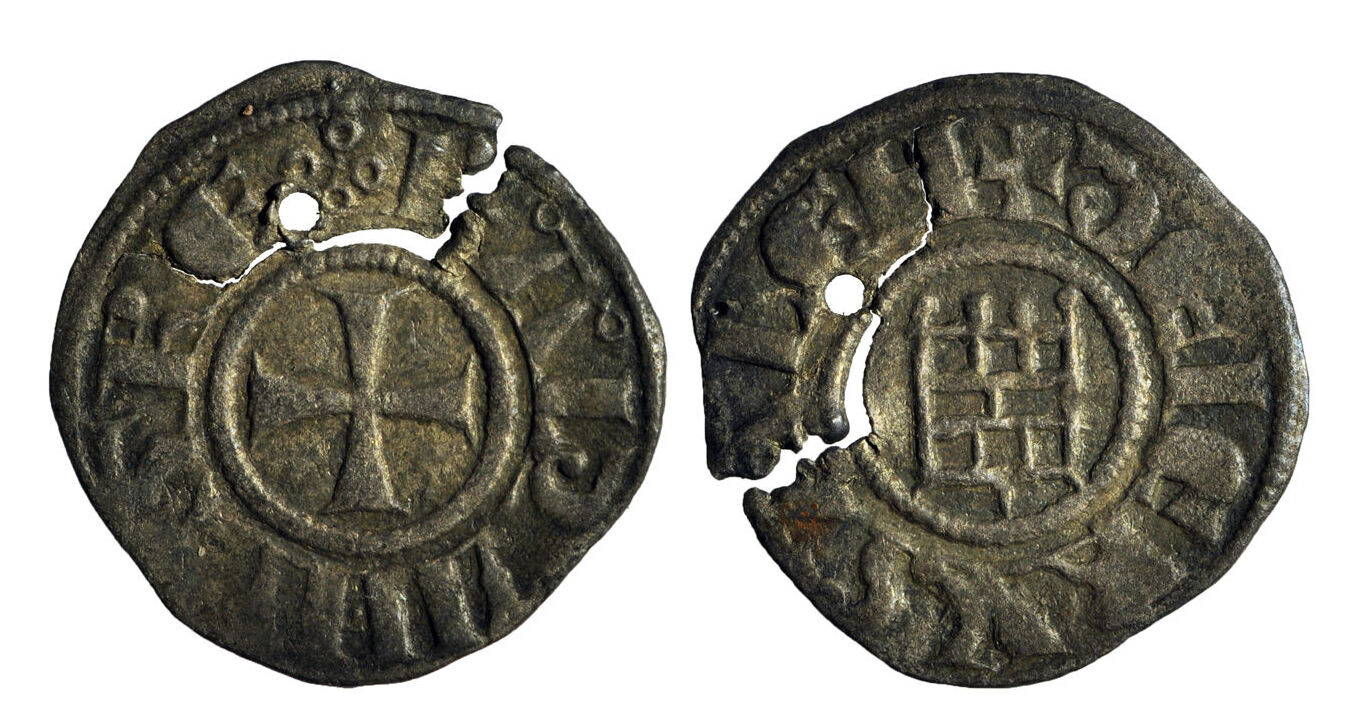
Baldwin overhauled the kingdom's currency by recalling foreign coins and producing a new royal issue.

At some point in his reign, likely in the 1150s, Baldwin staged a bold intervention in the kingdom's monetary system, which was long reliant on foreign coinage from Lucca and Valence. He ordered a full recall of these circulating coins and melted them down to produce a new royal issue. This recoinage yielded 11 to 12 million billon deniers and oboles, "an enormous output". William relates that Baldwin was well-versed in the laws of the kingdom, and a law forbidding vassals from striking their own currency probably belongs to this same initiative, reflecting a coordinated effort to establish a centralized royal monopoly over minting.

=== Assembly at Tripoli ===
In April 1152, Nur ad-Din conquered Tortosa from Count Raymond II of Tripoli, Baldwin's uncle. Baldwin arrived shortly after and convinced the Muslim garrison to depart. In mid-1152, Baldwin summoned a general assembly of the crusader states in Tripoli. He thus demonstrated his authority by summoning the barons, who had earlier ignored him, even outside of the kingdom. The assembly was attended by Count Raymond, his wife and Melisende's sister Hodierna, Melisende's niece Princess Constance of Antioch and the Antiochene barons and clergy. The king apparently did not invite his mother, but she attended anyway. Besides dealing with public matters, Baldwin wished to pressure the widowed Constance to remarry and relieve him of the responsibility to defend her principality; Hodierna and Melisende aided him in these efforts. He proposed Yves II of Soissons, Walter of Saint Omer, and Ralph of Merle, but Constance rejected them all.

As a young man, Baldwin was temperate in food and drink but prone to gambling and lechery, and after the council, he remained in Tripoli to gamble. As her marriage to Count Raymond had broken down, Countess Hodierna left the city with Melisende; the Assassins killed Raymond after he escorted them. The murder was followed by an eruption of Frankish violence against the indigenous population of Tripoli, which Baldwin stopped. He immediately recalled his mother and aunt to attend the funeral, after which he ordered all the nobles of the county to pay homage to Hodierna and her children, Raymond III and Melisende. Raymond was soon after sent to live in Jerusalem, and the historian Kevin J. Lewis believes that Baldwin took charge of his young cousin's upbringing.

=== Conquest of Ascalon ===
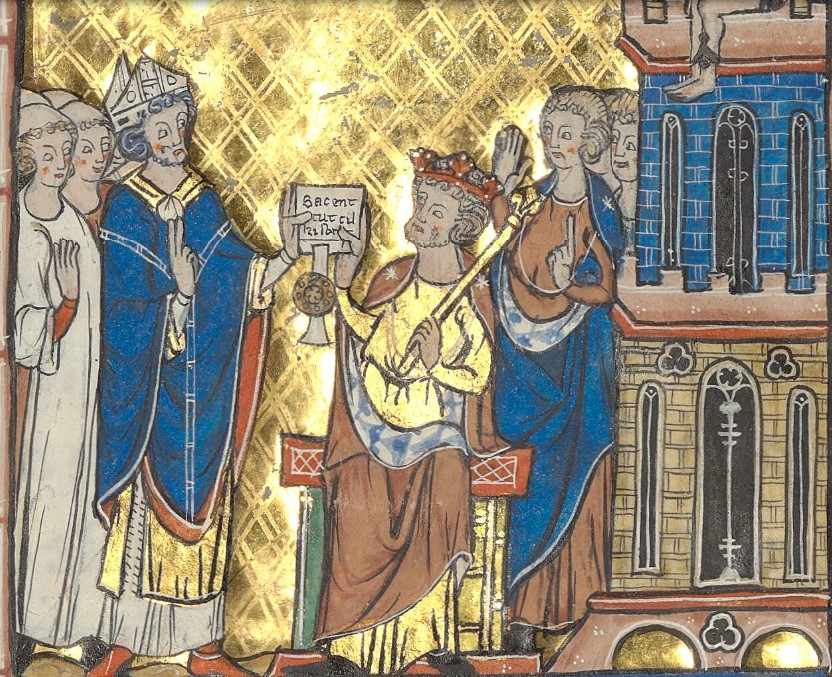
Shocked by the news of the torture of the patriarch of Antioch, Baldwin sent envoys to intervene.

The commotions of early 1152 allowed the men of Ascalon to attack Gaza. In January 1153, the Franks laid a siege to Ascalon. Men came from Europe to assist in the siege, some of them for pay. One such knight, Raynald of Châtillon, travelled to Antioch and charmed Princess Constance, but they kept their relationship secret until they received Baldwin's consent to marry in early 1154. Barber believes that Baldwin, preoccupied as he was, welcomed Raynald's ascension in Antioch. Patriarch Aimery was displeased at having lost his influence, however, and Raynald soon came into conflict with him. The situation culminated in Raynald torturing the patriarch. King Baldwin was shocked and sent his chancellor, Ralph, and Frederick of la Roche, bishop of Acre, to rebuke and caution Raynald. Raynald acquiesced, but Aimery left Antioch for Jerusalem.

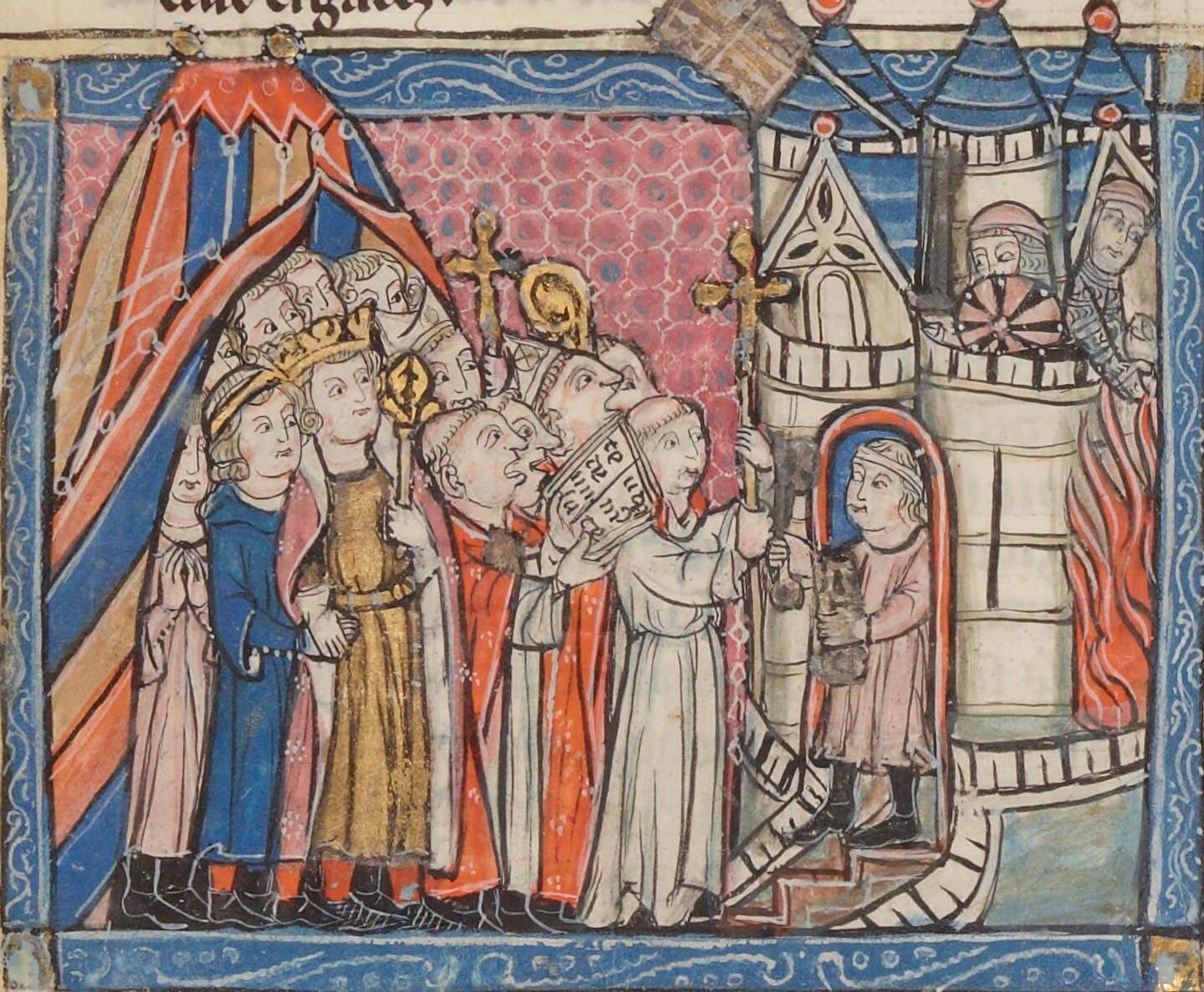
Baldwin's entry into Ascalon, after a long and arduous siege, opened up the possibility of conquering all of Egypt.

The siege of Ascalon progressed slowly and with considerable difficulty. Despite the town's isolation, its strong defenses and ample water supply frustrated the besiegers. Reinforcements and ships from the West eventually enabled construction of siege engines, but the arrival of an Egyptian relief fleet in June briefly lifted the blockade and revived Muslim resistance. A failed Templar assault also led to heavy losses. Though a breach was eventually made, the defenders rallied, destroyed the siege engine, and repelled the attackers. After five months at Ascalon, Baldwin was disillusioned and called a council in the presence of the True Cross. Most of the nobility, including Baldwin himself, were prepared to abandon the siege, but Patriarch Fulcher and Raymond du Puy, master of the Hospitallers, prevailed on them to persevere. The citizens finally surrendered on 22 August 1153; the king provided an escort for them up to Arish, and entered the city amid widespread celebration.

After the capture of Ascalon, King Baldwin made peace with Queen Melisende and took her advice when he distributed the conquered land. In 1154, he started associating her in his public accounts and restored the County of Jaffa to Amalric, adding Ascalon to it. The king's triumph was tempered by Nur ad-Din's own success in uniting all of Muslim Syria under his rule. The ruler of Damascus, Mujir ad-Din Abaq, desperately appealed to the Franks for help, offering them Baalbek and a part of the Beqaa Valley, but was defeated on 25 April 1154 before the Franks could react. In Egypt, the loss of Ascalon was followed by unrest, and Baldwin began exploring the possibility of conquering the country. In 1156, he and Melisende negotiated a treaty with the Republic of Pisa to embargo arms and ship-building supplies to Egypt.

=== Struggle with Nur ad-Din ===
Nur ad-Din's conquest of Damascus in 1154 was followed by a period of peaceful relations with Jerusalem, which both he and Baldwin were inclined to maintain. They negotiated a truce in June 1155 and renewed it in 1156; Nur ad-Din even continued to pay Damascus' tribute to Jerusalem. However, the extremely costly conquest of Ascalon left Baldwin burdened with debt. In February 1157, he resorted to attacking nomadic Arab and Turcoman livestock herders in the forest of Banyas; although they had the king's permission to graze their flocks there, they were plundered and massacred or enslaved. The chronicler William of Tyre was indignant at this action, while Nur ad-Din regarded this as breaking the truce and decided to exact revenge. In May, he besieged Banyas, held by the lord of Toron, and did not leave until the king appeared with a large relief force in June. He had left Jerusalem in the care of a trusted vassal, Baldwin of Lille.

After restoring the defenses of Banyas, Baldwin disbanded the army and began the journey back to Jerusalem. His host, thus diminished, was attacked by Nur ad-Din at Jacob's Ford; numerous high-ranking prisoners were taken, including 87 Templars, and another 300 knights were killed or captured. Rumor had it that the king, who escaped to Safed, had been killed too, and Nur ad-Din had his men thoroughly search for his body. Concerned that the unmarried king might die childless, the High Court urgently convened and discussed several options for a royal marriage before agreeing that only the Byzantine Empire could solve the king's financial problems. Envoys led by Archbishop Letard I of Nazareth and Humphrey II of Toron were duly dispatched to Constantinople later that year. Baldwin sent a letter promising to grant Acre as dower to his bride and to abide by whatever his envoys arranged.

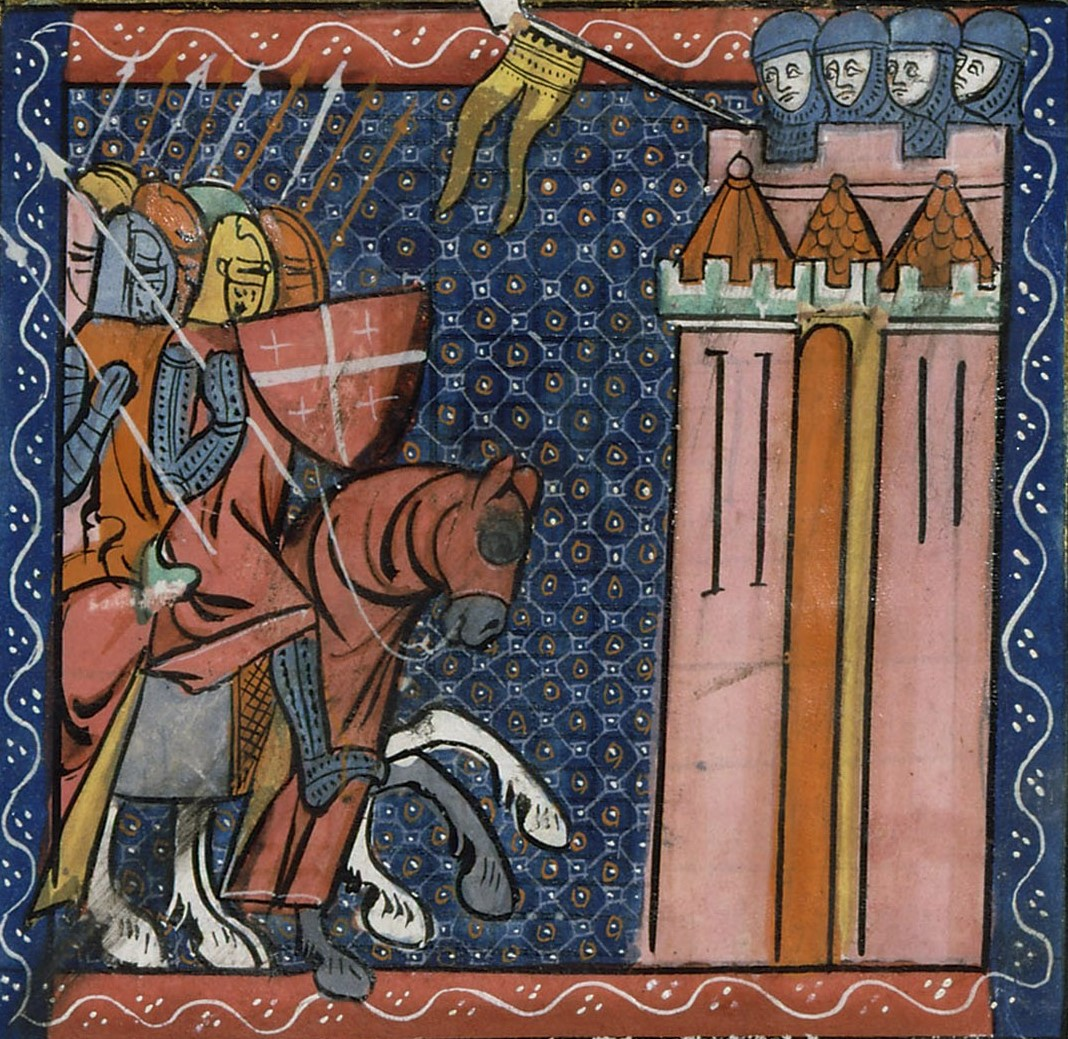
The siege of Shaizar was abandoned because of the attackers' disagreements.

Nur ad-Din abandoned his plan for a second attack on Banyas when he learned that King Baldwin, Count Raymond III of Tripoli, and Prince Raynald of Antioch had united their forces against him at Chastel Neuf. He soon fell ill, emboldening the Franks. Baldwin's half-sister Sibylla of Anjou and her husband, Count Thierry of Flanders, arrived in the Latin East likely in September 1157. Baldwin joined forces with Raynald, the counts, and Thoros II of Cilicia to seize the city of Shaizar. The king decreed that the city would belong to Thierry, but Raynald insisted that it was part of the Principality of Antioch and that its lord should render homage to him. Thierry refused to pay homage for it to anyone but Baldwin and the siege of Shaizar was thus abandoned, but Harim was taken in January 1158.

=== Family affairs ===
Upon the death of Patriarch Fulcher on 20 November 1157, King Baldwin delegated the choice of a new patriarch to his mother Melisende, his half-sister Sibylla, and his aunt Hodierna. They appointed Amalric of Nesle. The king's brother, Count Amalric, married Agnes of Courtenay shortly after.

Baldwin's embassy returned from Constantinople in September 1158 with Emperor Manuel's 12-year-old niece, Theodora. She came with a dowry of 100,000 hyperpyra and a further 14,000 for the wedding. Baldwin, in turn, bestowed upon her Acre and promised to work towards securing Byzantine overlordship over Antioch. Because Patriarch Amalric had not yet been consecrated, it was Aimery of Limoges, the exiled patriarch of Antioch, who anointed and crowned the young queen and celebrated the royal marriage. Baldwin had led a dissolute life, but William of Tyre credits marriage with changing him; the historians Peter W. Edbury and John G. Rowe remain skeptical of this report. Hamilton concludes that Baldwin and Theodora were happy together, but she was not normally associated in his acts. He attributes this reluctance to Baldwin's earlier experience of his mother's dominant role in government.

=== Diplomacy at Antioch ===
In early 1159, Emperor Manuel marched east, chased Thoros out of Tarsus, and reduced Prince Raynald of Antioch to vassalage at Mamistra. Baldwin hastened to Antioch with his brother and the patriarch. Manuel was reluctant to receive him, apparently concerned that Baldwin would claim the principality for himself, but gave in after the king insisted. Baldwin was greeted by the emperor's nephews, Alexios Komnenos and John Doukas Komnenos. Manuel saluted him with a kiss of peace and had him seated next to himself on only a slightly lower throne.

Baldwin spent ten days with Manuel and established a cordial relationship. The king received a subsidy of 22,000 hyperpyra and 3,000 marks of silver as well as luxurious gifts. Baldwin petitioned Manuel on behalf of Thoros, who was allowed to return to Tarsus as the emperor's vassal. Baldwin's diplomacy earned him widespread praise and the appreciation of both the Greeks and Armenians. On 12 April, the emperor staged a triumphal entry into Antioch, with the prince holding the bridle of the emperor's horse while the king rode behind them. Tournaments and hunts followed, and after Baldwin fell from his horse in a hunting accident and broke his arm, Manuel attended to him.

To the dismay of the Franks, no action against Nur ad-Din followed the festivities at Antioch, and Manuel instead returned to Constantinople. The emperor's show of force in Cilicia and Antioch deterred Nur ad-Din, who released numerous prisoners taken at Banyas and allied with Manuel against the sultan of Rum, Kilij Arslan II. Taking advantage of Nur ad-Din's campaign against the sultan, Baldwin plundered the Hauran, extorting 4,000 gold pieces from Nur ad-Din's governor of Damascus, Najm al-Din Ayyub.

=== Byzantine betrothal ===
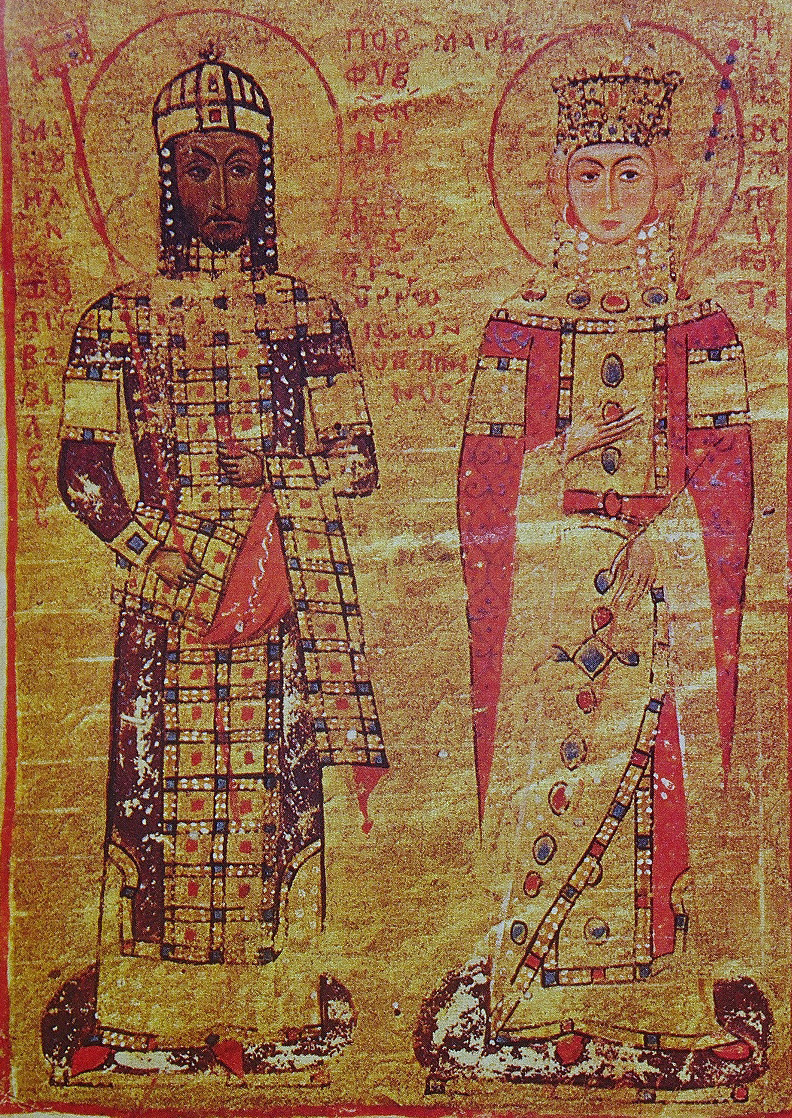
Emperor Manuel and Empress Maria. Manuel asked Baldwin to choose a relative for Manuel to marry, but Baldwin made the wrong choice.

Emperor Manuel next sent an embassy led by John Kontostephanos and an Italian named Theophylact to King Baldwin requesting that the king select a wife for the emperor among the noblewomen of the Latin East. In the chrysobull they carried the emperor narrowed his choice to Baldwin's relatives Melisende of Tripoli and Maria of Antioch. Though he otherwise liked the Byzantines, Baldwin did not wish to see their influence in Antioch increase and thus selected Melisende. The emperor agreed, and the royal family began preparing for the wedding. In early summer 1161, a son was born to Baldwin's brother, Amalric. The boy was christened Baldwin in honor of his uncle the king, who stood as his godfather. When a courtier asked what gift he planned to give his nephew at the christening, King Baldwin laughed and said, "the Kingdom of Jerusalem".

In July 1161, Melisende of Tripoli and her family arrived in Jerusalem, possibly to discuss the impending imperial marriage with King Baldwin, but also to attend to Queen Melisende, who was on her deathbed. They and Queen Theodora consented to the agreement by which the king granted the lordship of Transjordan to Philip of Milly in exchange for Philip's land in Nablus. The king thus violated his 1152 agreement with his mother, but she was incapacitated and nobody protested. Mayer argues that the exchange was Baldwin's last account to settle with his mother's former supporters, and that it was forced on Philip. Barber notes that Philip had been completely loyal to Baldwin since Melisende's downfall, and that Baldwin would not have entrusted an important lordship to a man whom he did not trust. According to William of Tyre, Baldwin was despondent when Queen Melisende died on 11 September 1161; Mayer describes this as "a fine public show of grief". At that point, the entire area of Nablus passed to the royal domain.

Prince Raynald was captured during a raiding expedition in late 1161. The Antiochene barons invited Baldwin to assume regency, apparently distrusting Constance because of her Byzantine leanings. He appointed Joscelin of Courtenay to govern the important fief of Harim, rebuilt a fort on the Orontes, declared that Constance's son Bohemond III was the rightful prince, and decreed that Patriarch Aimery should rule during Bohemond's minority, a decision against which Constance appealed to Constantinople.

By 1162, Manuel had still not married Melisende of Tripoli. Baldwin, who had arrived in Tripoli to bid farewell to the prospective empress, sent an ultimatum demanding the end to the prevarications in mid-1162. The imperial court finally announced that the emperor would not marry Melisende. Baldwin was gravely offended, but a further shock ensued when he traveled to Antioch and found Byzantine envoys Alexios Komnenos and John Kamateros negotiating the emperor's marriage with Constance's daughter, Maria. Lewis argues that the decision given to Baldwin by Manuel was only a diplomatic courtesy, and that the emperor expected Baldwin to select Maria because an alliance with Antioch was obviously more desirable to Constantinople. Baldwin, though deeply affronted, restrained his anger out of regard for Maria. In any case, he could not afford to oppose Manuel and so agreed to the Antiochene match. The Byzantines simultaneously established Maria's mother, Constance, as the ruler of the principality.

== Death and aftermath ==
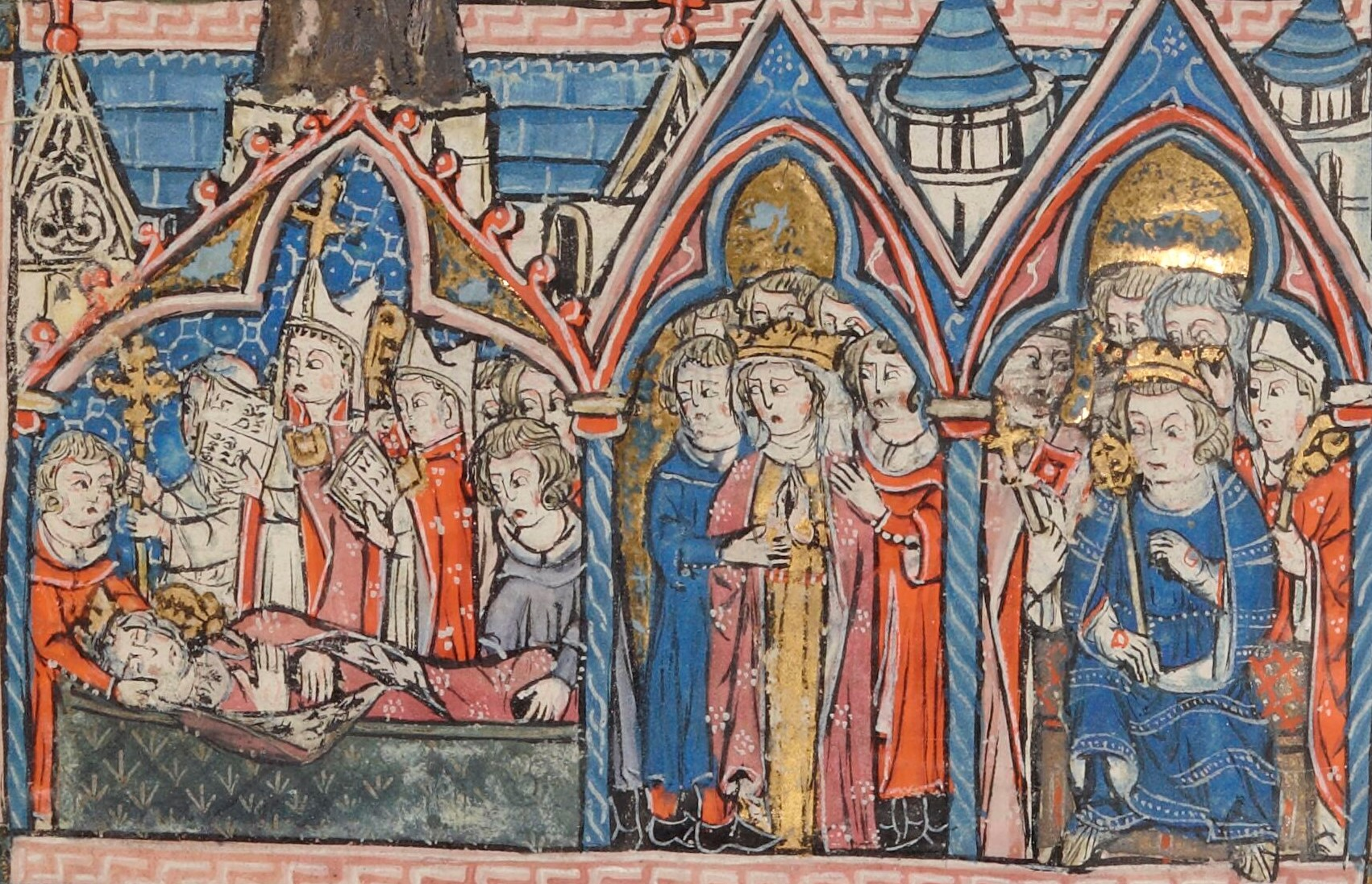
Baldwin died childless leaving a young widow and his brother as king.

Baldwin was staying in Antioch in late 1162 when, on the approach of winter, he requested a herbal tonic from Beric, the Syrian physician of the count of Tripoli. Beric gave him pills, which the king took. Baldwin subsequently contracted dysentery. Realizing that his condition was worsening, he left Antioch and set out for his kingdom. Baldwin was carried to Beirut, where he summoned his barons and clergy; he died there on 10 February 1163. Because Baldwin had been only 33, strong, and in good health, William reports that Beric's pills were widely suspected of having been poisoned. William lamented that the Frankish rulers in the East were eager to accept treatment from native physicians. He relates that a dog died within days of being fed Baldwin's pills; Edbury and Rowe describe this narrative as "ridiculous" and displaying "a total lack of discretion and judgement".

As Baldwin's body was carried in a procession to Jerusalem, both Christians and Muslims came to pay respect. He was buried alongside the other kings in the Church of the Holy Sepulchre on 18 February. William reports that Nur ad-Din was advised to attack while Baldwin's people mourned, but refused out of respect for the late king. Baldwin's marriage with Theodora had produced no children, and his heir was consequently his brother, Amalric.

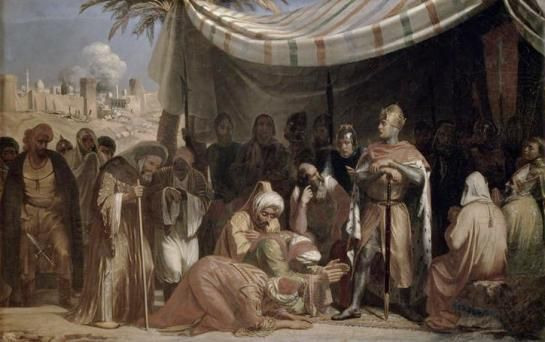
The conquest of Ascalon, depicted here by Sébastien-Melchior Cornu, is commonly seen as Baldwin III's greatest achievement.

William of Tyre, the chief chronicler of the 12th-century Kingdom of Jerusalem, was born in 1130, the same year as Baldwin, making him the king's exact contemporary and likely someone who knew him well. Although he took the queen's side in the conflict between Baldwin and Melisende, William saw an ideal king in Baldwin and presented him as exceptionally gifted. Baldwin III was slow to establish his authority, and when he eventually did, his time on the throne was shorter than expected. Yet, he reigned longer than any other king of Jerusalem in the 12th century, and in the last ten years of his rule, he left a clear mark on the crusader states. His main focus was on southern affairs, initially confronting Ascalon and later beginning to turn attention towards Egypt. These actions influenced the strategies of his successor, Amalric, and impacted the political landscape in Tripoli and Antioch, where rulers were constrained by both Byzantine territorial ambitions and the growing military threat posed by Nur ad-Din.

Regnal titles
Preceded by Fulk; Melisende	King of Jerusalem; 1143–1163 with Melisende (1143–1152)	Succeeded by Amalric
