= Robert I (archbishop of Nazareth) =

Archbishop of Nazareth (d. 1153)

Robert I was the archbishop of Nazareth in the Kingdom of Jerusalem from 1138 until his death in 1153.

Robert first appears in historical record in 1138, when he witnessed two diplomas of King Fulk as archbishop-elect. He was the successor of Archbishop William I. The archbishop of Nazareth held a fief from the crown, a distinction shared only by the bishop of Lydda, and thus had the right to sit in the High Court of Jerusalem. This enabled Robert to actively participate in the politics of the kingdom. In 1140–1141, he was in Tripoli; the historian Bernard Hamilton suggests that Robert might have been there to welcome Alberic of Ostia, a papal legate who was returning from Antioch with the Latin patriarch of Jerusalem, William of Malines, after deposing the Latin patriarch of Antioch, Ralph of Domfront.

Because Robert witnessed charters which Queen Melisende issued without reference to King Baldwin III, the historian Hans Eberhard Mayer concludes that the archbishop sided with the mother in her struggle for power against her son. He later witnessed the diplomas of King Baldwin as well.

Robert objected to Bishop Bernard of Nazareth's grant of the parish church at Ligio to the Abbey of Saint Mary of the Valley of Jehosaphat because it placed the parish beyond Robert's effective jurisdiction. He appointed his own chaplain to the church, ostensibly to say Mass for the soul of William I of Bures, but then granted him full rights as parish priest and barred the monks from performing pastoral duties. This led to conflict, including a violent incident when the chaplain's clerk attacked a Jehosaphat priest while the latter was saying Mass. The dispute between the archbishop and the abbot of Jehosaphat remained unresolved until 1161.

When in 1147 King Baldwin led the Christian army in an attempt to capture Bosra and the plain of Hauran, Robert rode along carrying the True Cross. The army marched slowly because they were short of water and surrounded by hostile Turkish forces. After several days they arrived within sight of Bosra only to learn that it had already been occupied by the Turks. On their way back, the army faced fires set to the crops and brushwood by the Turks. The chronicler William of Tyre narrates that the Christians were only saved when Robert raised the True Cross against the flames, changing the direction of the wind; Ibn al-Qalanisi, however, wrote that the Turks had been restrained from attacking them further. In 1148 Robert participated in the Council of Acre, where leaders of the kingdom and other participants of the Second Crusade coordinated the attack on Damascus. In 1153 Robert brought his knights to the siege of Ascalon. He died soon after the fall of Ascalon and was succeeded by Letard I.
