= Caesarea in Palaestina =

Caesarea in Palestina may refer to:

- the Roman city of Caesarea Maritima
- the ancient and medieval diocese (and later titular see), see Caesarea in Palaestina (diocese)
