= Caesarea in Palaestina (diocese) =

Titular see of the Catholic Church

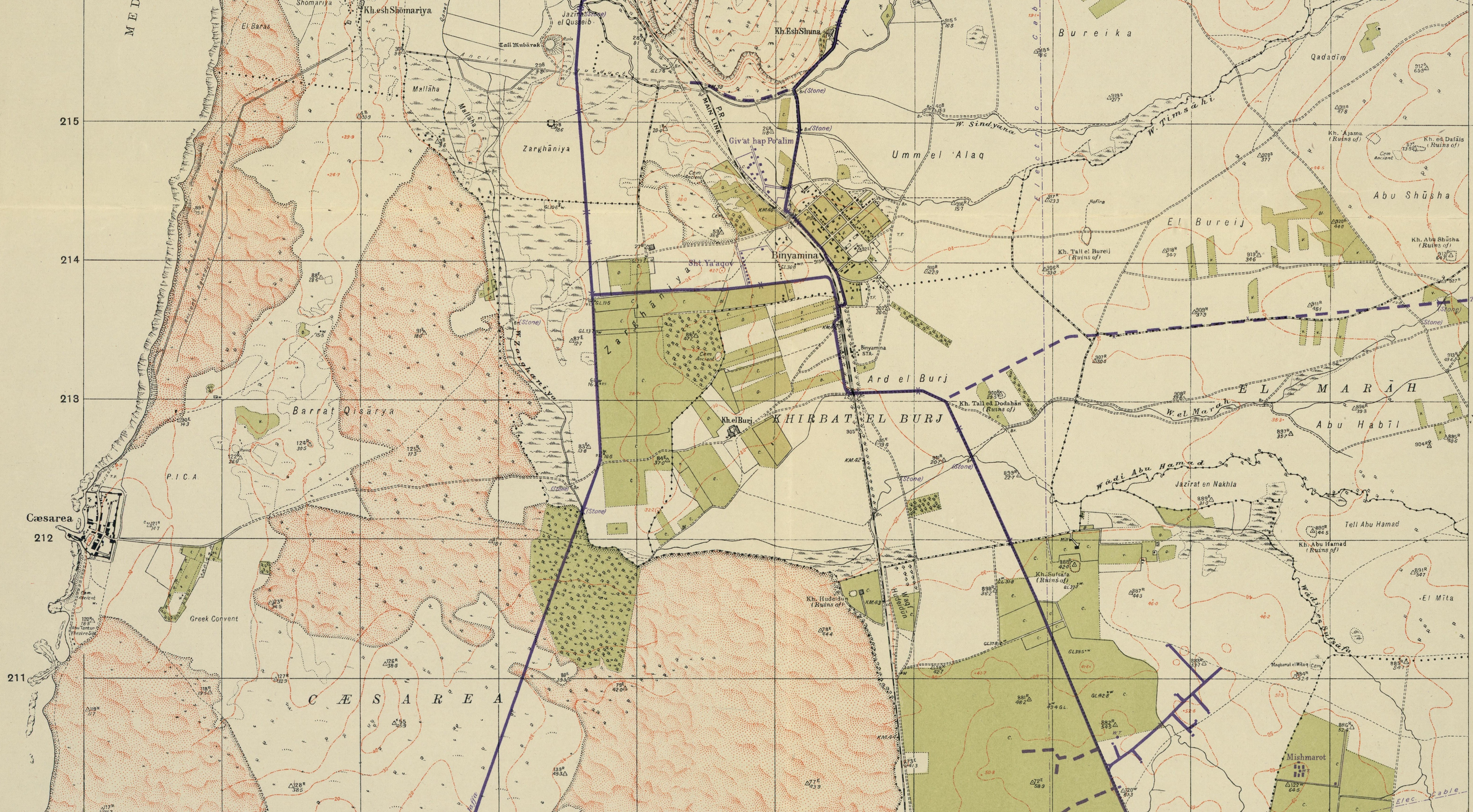
A map of the see

The archiepiscopal see of Caesarea in Palaestina, also known as Caesarea Maritima, is now a metropolitan see of the Eastern Orthodox Patriarchate of Jerusalem and also a titular see of the Catholic Church. It was one of the earliest Christian bishoprics, and was a metropolitan see at the time of the First Council of Nicaea, but was later subjected to the Patriarchate of Jerusalem. The city remained largely Christian until the Crusades, its bishop maintaining close ties to the Byzantine Empire. After the establishment of the Kingdom of Jerusalem by the crusaders, the see was transformed into a Latin archdiocese, subordinate to the Latin patriarch of Jerusalem.

== History ==
The diocese was an ancient one, established in one of the first Christian communities ever created: it was due to the work of St Peter and St Paul. Records of the community are dated as far back as the 2nd century. According to the Apostolic Constitutions (7.46), the first Bishop of Caesarea was Zacchaeus the Publican. Caesarea Maritima was the capital of Roman Iudaea province and after the Bar Kokhba revolt it was the metropolis of the diocese of Palaestina Prima. Until the establishment of the Patriarchate of Jerusalem, it was subject to the patriarch of Antioch. The most notable bishop of Caesarea was Eusebius of Caesarea, also known as Eusebius Pamphili. The Library of Caesarea Maritima established by Pamphilus of Caesarea remained in existence until the Arabs invaded Palestine in the 7th century.

The diocese suffered a troubled history following the decline of the Eastern Roman Empire in the 7th century. The city was raided by the Sassanid Persians in the early 7th century. Following the conquest of the Holy Land by the Islamic armies in the 630s, the diocese and city suffered tremendously and steadily declined in size and importance. It was finally conquered in 640 following a protracted siege.

Nonetheless, it remained overwhelmingly Christian, and in the absence of imperial oversight, its independence increased and the archbishop became the effective ruler of the area. By the 9th century there was a substantial colony of Frankish settlers established by Emperor Charlemagne to facilitate Christian pilgrimages. However, by the 10th century, as periodic Islamic persecution continued and the aura of Byzantine Imperial authority made a resurgence, the diocese fell under the influence of the patriarch of Constantinople for protection and supervision and increasingly fell under Byzantine authority.

St Pamphilus of Caesarea devoted his life to searching out and obtaining ancient texts which he collected in the Library of Caesarea Maritima that Jerome was later to use, and established a school for theological study. In the scriptorium, a necessary adjunct to all libraries of antiquity, he oversaw the production of accurate edited copies of Scripture. Testimonies to his zeal and care in this work are to be found in the colophons of biblical manuscripts. Jerome's "De Viris Illustribus" (75) says that Pamphilus "transcribed the greater part of the works of Origen of Alexandria with his own hand," and that "these are still preserved in the library of Cæsarea." The collections of the library suffered during the persecutions under the Emperor Diocletian, but were repaired subsequently by bishops of Caesarea. It was noted in the 6th century, but Henry Barclay Swete was of the opinion that it probably did not long survive the capture of Caesarea by the Saracens in 638, though a modern historian would attribute more destruction to its previous capture by the Sassanid Persians.

Following the schism between Constantinople and Rome in 1054, the community was a Greek Orthodox diocese, with only a marginal Roman Catholic community.

During the crusader period, the community became Catholic in 1101. The Frankish community vastly increased in size and a Latin archbishop was established. Under the crusaders, the diocese increased over time to having ten suffragan bishops, including the bishop of Sebastea. During the remainder of the Kingdom of Jerusalem, the Latin patriarch of Jerusalem often served first as archbishop of Caesarea, or of Tyre.

There was a legend that the Holy Grail had been discovered in Caesarea; the ancient chalice found there in 1101 was later taken to Paris.

Since 1975 and until 2012, Eastern Orthodox Metropolitan of Caesarea was Basilios Blatsos, who was also an Exarch of Palaestina Prima, under the jurisdiction of the Eastern Orthodox Patriarchate of Jerusalem. It is unknown who is the current metropolitan.

== List of bishops ==
- Zacchaeus was the first bishop, according to the Apostolic Constitutions 7.46, followed by Cornelius (possibly Cornelius the Centurion) and Theophilus
- Theophilus (c. 189; see Church History 5.22, during the 10th year of Commodus)
- Theoctistus (216–258)
- Domnus (Church History VII.14)
- Theotecnus (Church History VII.14)
- Agapius (?–306)
- Eusebius (c. 313–339/340)
- Acacius (340–366)
- Gelasius (367–372)
- Euzoius (373–378)
- Gelasius (second period, 380–395)
- John (395-?; see Mark the Deacon, Life of Porphyry)
- Domninus (c. 420; see Theodoret, Letters 110)
- John of Choziba (6th century)
- Anastasius (11th century)
- Dositheus (1666-1669)

== List of archbishops ==
- Baldwin I (1101–1107)
- Ehremar (1108–1123 or later)
- Pagan (died c. 1129)
- Gaudentius (c. 1140)
- Baldwin II (c. 1142–1156?)
- Ernesius (1158–1175)
- Heraclius (1175–1180)
- Monachus (1181–1194)
- Peter I (1199–1237)
- Peter II (c. 1230)
- Lociaumes (1244–1266)

after which the see was defunct for the next two centuries.

The see was merely titular upon its restoration with

- Zweder van Culemborg (1432–1433)
- Christophe de Cheffontaines (1578–1595)
- Sigismund Albicus
- Pedro Manso (1609)
- Celio Piccolomini (1656–1665?)
- Federico Baldeschi Colonna (1665–1675?)
- Savo Millini (1675–1683)
- Giacomo Cantelmo (1683–1690)
- Lorenzo Casoni (1690–1711?)
- Giorgio Spinola (1711–1721?)
- Prospero Marefoschi (1721–1732)
- vacant
- Ignazio Michele Crivelli (1739–1764?)
- Luigi Valenti Gonzaga (1764–?)
- Michel El-Khazen ( 1767–1786 Died)
- Giovanni Battista Pignatelli (1779)
- Antonio Maria Trigona (1819–1835)
- Carlo Emmanuelle Sardagna de Hohenstein (1839–1840 Died)
- Juan Manuel de Irrizarri y Peralta (1840–1849)
- Jakub (Iacobus) Bosagi, C.M.Vd. (1855–1883)
- Antonio Agliardi (1884–1896)
- Pietro Gasparri (1898–1907)
- Vincenzo Sardi di Rivisondoli (1908–1920)
- Benedetto Aloisi Masella (1919–1920?)
- Luigi Maglione (1920–1935)
- Luigi Traglia (1936–1960)
- Dino Staffa (1960–1967)
- vacant
