= True Cross =

Relics claimed to be the cross upon which Jesus was crucified

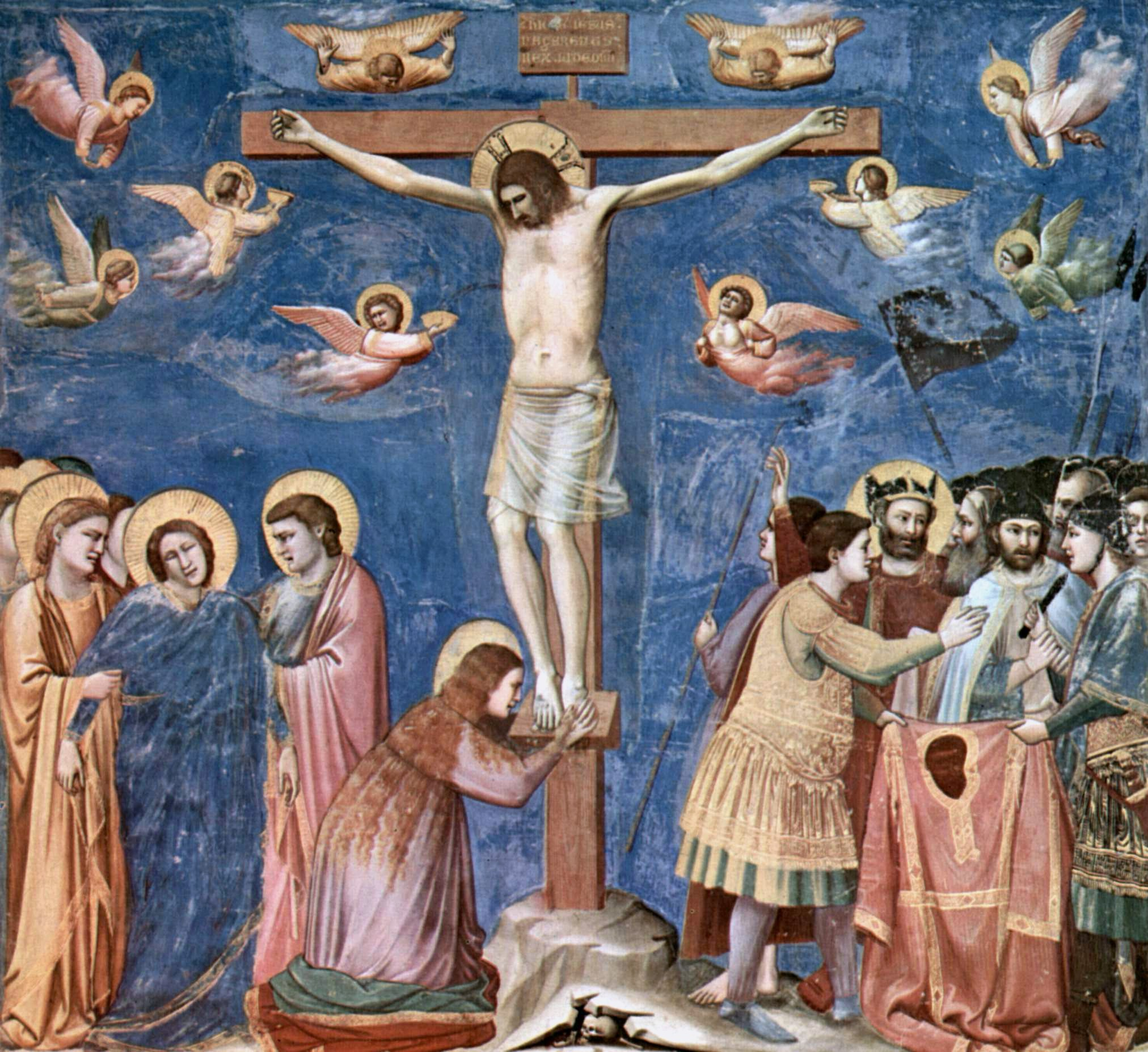
Christ Crucified by Giotto, c. 1310

In some Christian churches, the term True Cross refers to any relic that is claimed to be part of the original wooden cross on which Jesus of Nazareth was crucified. There is no evidence that any particular relic is an actual part of the original cross. The Catholic Church, Eastern Orthodoxy, and Oriental Orthodoxy churches, as well as denominations of the Church of the East, have all claimed to possess relics of the True Cross as objects of veneration. Historians generally dispute the authenticity of the relics, as do Protestant and other Christian churches, who do not hold them in as high regard.

Some fourth-century historians and certain Christian legends claim that Helena, the mother of Roman emperor Constantine the Great, recovered the True Cross at the Holy Sepulchre in Jerusalem when she travelled to the Holy Land in the years 326–328. The late fourth-century historians Gelasius of Caesarea and Tyrannius Rufinus wrote that while Helena was there, she discovered the hiding place of three crosses that were believed to have been used at the crucifixion of Jesus and the two thieves, Dismas and Gestas, who were executed with him. To one cross was affixed the titulus bearing Jesus's name, but according to Rufinus, Helena was unsure of its legitimacy until a miracle revealed that it was the True Cross. (Note: An early account of the legend of St Helen and the rediscovery of the True Cross was presented by the Old English poet Cynewulf. A detailed account of known sources for the legends is presented in Drijvers (1992).) This event is celebrated on the liturgical calendar as the Feast of the Exaltation of the Cross (Roodmas) by the Oriental Orthodox, Eastern Orthodox, Persian, Roman Catholic, Lutheran, and Anglican churches.

== Provenance ==
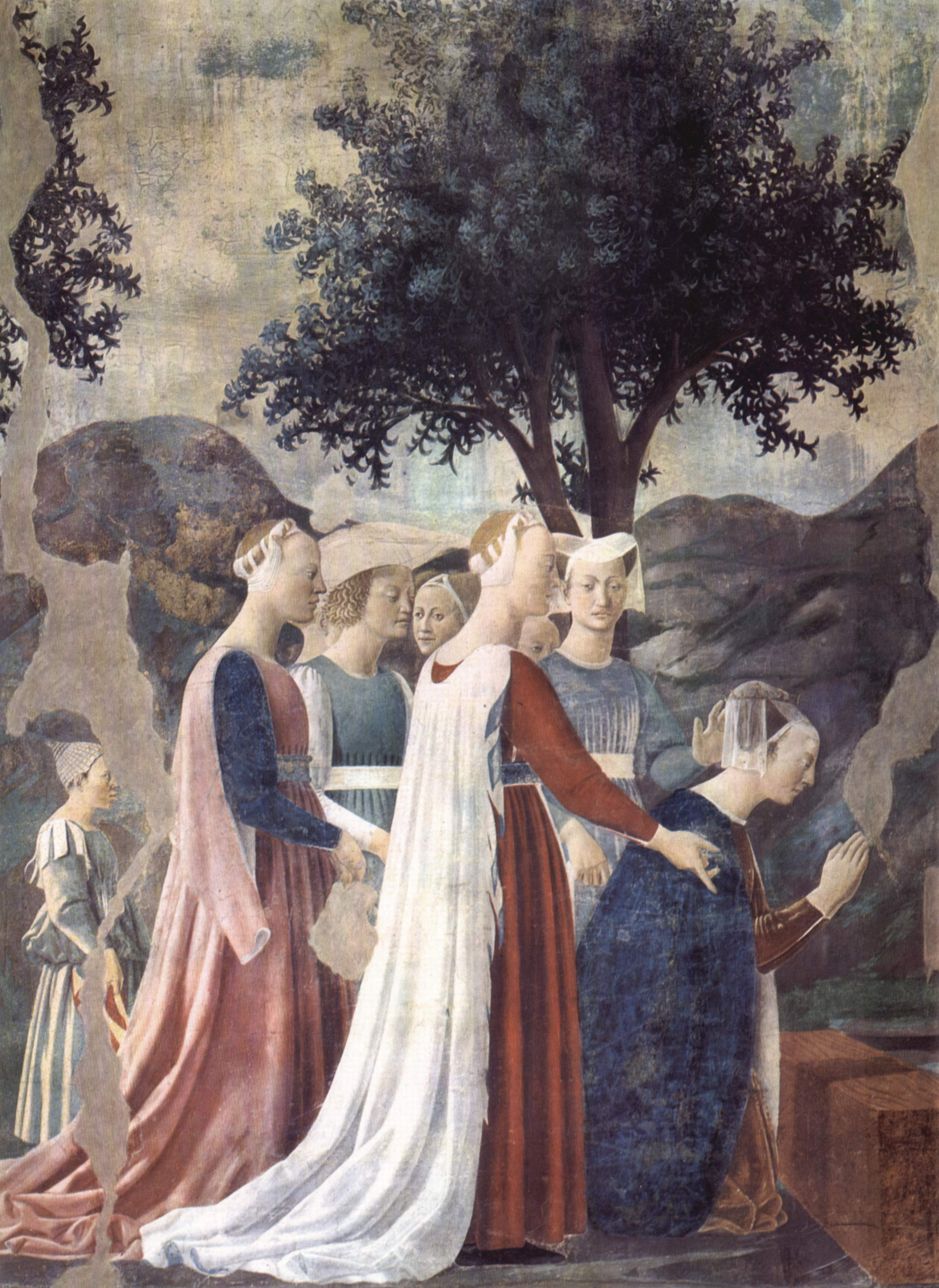
The Queen of Sheba venerates the wood from which the Cross will be made (mid 15th-century fresco by Piero della Francesca in San Francesco, Arezzo).

=== The Golden Legend ===
In the Latin-speaking traditions of Western Europe, the story of the True Cross was well established by the 13th century when, in 1260, it was recorded by Jacobus de Voragine, Bishop of Genoa, in the Golden Legend. (Note: This sense of the word "legend" is the less common one—borrowed directly from its Latin etymon "legenda"—of anything which should be read, rather than a historically based myth. Compare its use for historic accounts of early leaders of the church such as Gregory, Jerome, and Augustine as well as the hagiographies which produced its more usual modern sense.)

The Golden Legend contains several versions of the origin of the True Cross. In The Life of Adam, Voragine writes that the True Cross came from three trees which grew from three seeds from the "Tree of Mercy" which Seth collected and planted in the mouth of Adam's corpse.

In another account contained in "Of the Invention of the Holy Cross", Voragine writes that the True Cross came from a tree that grew from part of the Tree of Knowledge of Good and Evil, "the tree that Adam ate of", that Seth planted on Adam's grave where it "endured there unto the time of Solomon". Alternatively, it reached Solomon via Moses, who used it as the staff of Moses, and David, who planted it at Jerusalem. It was felled by Solomon to be a beam in his temple but not found suitable in the end.

After many centuries, the tree was cut down and the wood used to build a bridge over which the Queen of Sheba passed on her journey to meet Solomon. So struck was she by the portent contained in the timber of the bridge that she fell on her knees and revered it. On her visit to Solomon, she told him that a piece of wood from the bridge would bring about the replacement of God's covenant with the Jewish people by a new order. Solomon, fearing the eventual destruction of his people, had the timber buried.

After fourteen generations, the wood taken from the bridge was fashioned into the Cross used to crucify Jesus Christ. Voragine then goes on to describe its rediscovery by Helena, mother of the Emperor Constantine.

In the Late Middle Ages and Early Renaissance, there was wide general acceptance of the account of the cross's history as presented by Voragine. This general acceptance is displayed in numerous artworks on the subject, culminating in one of the most famous fresco cycles of the Renaissance, the Legend of the True Cross by Piero della Francesca, which he painted on the walls of the chancel of the Church of San Francesco in Arezzo between 1452 and 1466, faithfully reproducing the episodes of The Golden Legend.

=== Eastern Christianity ===
According to the sacred tradition of the Eastern Orthodox Church the True Cross was made from three different types of wood: cedar, pine and cypress. This is an allusion to Isaiah 60:13: "The glory of Lebanon shall come unto thee, the fir tree, the pine tree, and the box [cypress] together to beautify the place of my sanctuary, and I will make the place of my feet glorious." The link between this verse and the crucifixion lies in the words "the place of my feet", which is interpreted as referring to the footrest (Latin: suppedāneum) on which Jesus's feet were nailed and which appears on the Orthodox cross. (Compare with the Jewish concepts of the Ark of the Covenant or the Jerusalem Temple as being God's footstool, and the prescribed Three Pilgrimage Festivals, in Hebrew aliya la-regel, lit. ascending to the foot).

=== Tradition of Lot's triple tree ===
A further tradition holds that these three trees from which the True Cross was constructed grew together in one spot. A traditional Orthodox icon in the Monastery of the Cross depicts Lot, the nephew of Abraham, watering the trees. According to tradition, these trees were used to construct the Temple in Jerusalem ("to beautify the place of my sanctuary"). Later, during Herod's reconstruction of the Temple, the wood from these trees was removed from the Temple and discarded, eventually being used to construct the cross on which Jesus was crucified ("and I will make the place of my feet glorious").

== Empress Helena and the Cross ==
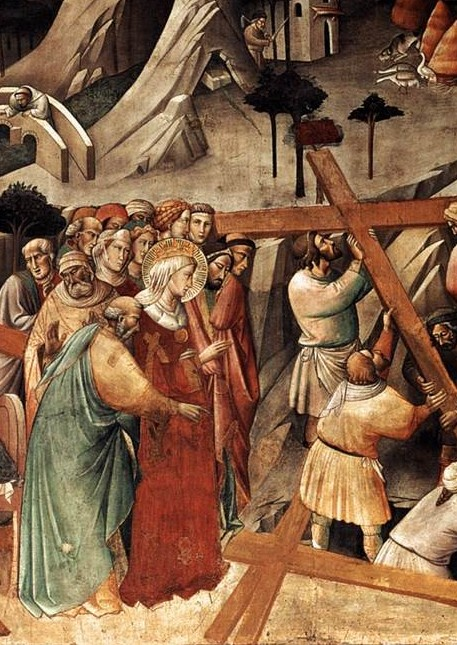
The Finding of the True Cross, Agnolo Gaddi, Florence, 1380

The rediscovery of the True Cross, called the "Invention of the True Cross" (from the Latin inventio, "finding", a meaning obsolete in English except in this phrase), was traditionally attributed to Saint Helena, mother of Constantine I, an account that emerged over time.

=== Eusebius ===
The Life of Constantine by Eusebius of Caesarea (died 339) is the earliest and main historical source on the rediscovery of the Tomb of Jesus and the construction of the first church at the site, but does not mention anything concerning the True Cross. Eusebius describes how the site of the Holy Sepulchre, once a site of veneration for the early Christian Church in Jerusalem, had been covered over with earth and a temple of Venus had been built on top. Although Eusebius does not say as much, this would probably have been done as part of Hadrian's 130 reconstruction of Jerusalem into the Roman city of Aelia Capitolina, following Jerusalem's destruction at the end of the Jewish Revolt in the year 70, and in connection with Bar Kokhba's revolt of 132–135. Following his conversion to Christianity, Emperor Constantine ordered in about 325–326 that the site be uncovered and instructed Macarius, Bishop of Jerusalem, to build a church on the site. Eusebius' work contains details about the demolition of the pagan temple and the erection of the church, but does not mention anywhere the finding of the True Cross.

=== Cyril of Jerusalem ===
Perhaps the earliest witness to the tradition of the True Cross was Cyril, Bishop of Jerusalem (c. 350–386). In the fourth of his Catechetical Lectures, which are dated to around the year 350, he says that "the whole world has since been filled with pieces of the wood of the Cross." This text relates that pieces of the cross were dispersed as relics, but offers no information about the discovery of the cross itself. Elsewhere, in a letter to Emperor Constantius, Cyril only relates that the cross was found during the reign of Constantine.

=== Gelasius and Rufinus ===
About forty years after Cyril, there was a fully developed story about how the True Cross was discovered. Cyril's nephew Gelasius of Caesarea recorded the account in a now lost Greek Ecclesiastical History prior to his death in 395. This version was adapted circa 402 in Rufinus of Aquileia's Latin additions to Eusebius' Church History. In this narrative, Helena went to Jerusalem in search of the relic and was made aware of its location by a heavenly sign. She tore down the temple of Aphrodite that had been built there, and beneath the rubble found three crosses. The cross of Jesus was identified, with the aid of Bishop Macarius of Jerusalem, by its miraculous effecting of a cure for a mortally ill woman. A Church was then built on the spot and the relic was divided, with part staying in Jerusalem and part given to Constantine along with the nails.

=== Socrates Scholasticus ===
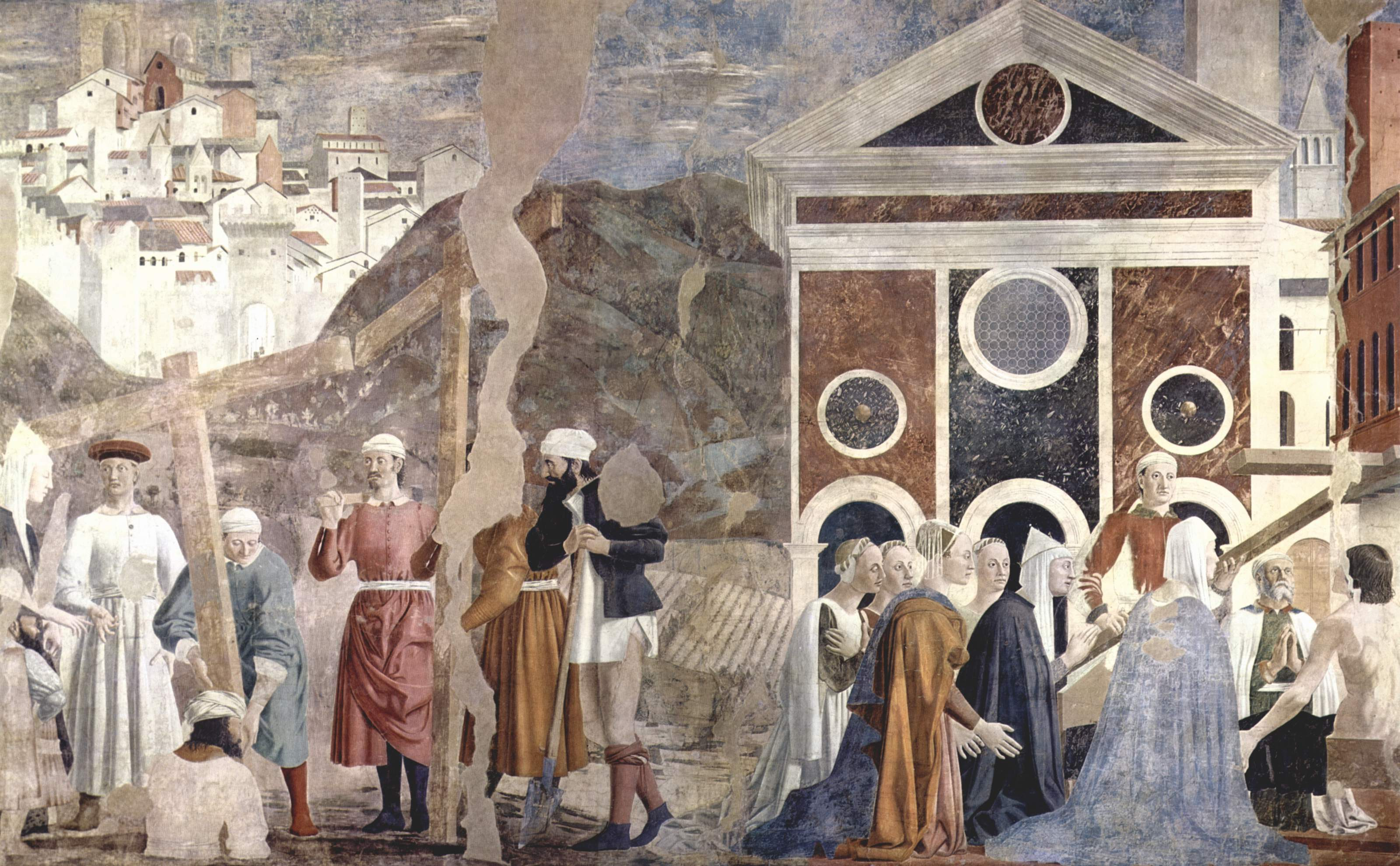
The three crosses are discovered. An injured young man is healed by the True Cross. Fifteenth-century frescoes at the Church of San Francesco, Arezzo by Piero della Francesca.

In his Ecclesiastical History, nearly a century after Eusebius and forty years after Rufinus, Socrates Scholasticus (died c. 440) gives a description of the discovery later repeated by Sozomen and Theodoret. Socrates' account is very similar to Rufinus'.

[Helena] found three crosses in the sepulchre: one of these was that blessed cross on which Christ had hung, the other two were those on which the two thieves that were crucified with him had died. ... Since, however, it was doubtful which was the cross they were in search of, the emperor’s mother was not a little distressed; but from this trouble the bishop of Jerusalem, Macarius, shortly relieved her. And he solved the doubt by faith, for he sought a sign from God and obtained it. The sign was this: a certain woman of the neighborhood, who had been long afflicted with disease, was now just at the point of death; the bishop therefore arranged it so that each of the crosses should be brought to the dying woman, believing that she would be healed on touching the precious cross. Nor was he disappointed in his expectation: for the two crosses having been applied which were not the Lord’s, the woman still continued in a dying state; but when the third, which was the true cross, touched her, she was immediately healed, and recovered her former strength.

In it he describes how Helena Augusta, Constantine's aged mother, had the pagan temple destroyed and the Sepulchre uncovered, whereupon three crosses, the titulus, and the nails from Jesus's crucifixion were uncovered as well. In Socrates's version of the story, Macarius had a deathly ill woman touch the three crosses. This woman only recovered upon the touch of the third cross, which was taken as a sign that this was the cross of Christ, the new Christian symbol. Socrates also reports that, having also found the cross's nails, Helena sent these to Constantinople, where they were incorporated into the emperor's helmet and the bridle of his horse.

=== Sozomen ===
In his Ecclesiastical History, Sozomen (died c. 450) gives essentially the same version as Socrates. Without further attribution, he also adds that it was said that the location of the Sepulchre was "disclosed by a Hebrew who dwelt in the East and who derived his information from some documents which had come to him by paternal inheritance"—although Sozomen himself disputes this account—so that a dead person was also revived by the touch of the Cross. Later popular versions of this story state that the Jew who assisted Helena was named Jude or Judas but later converted to Christianity and took the name Kyriakos.

=== Theodoret ===
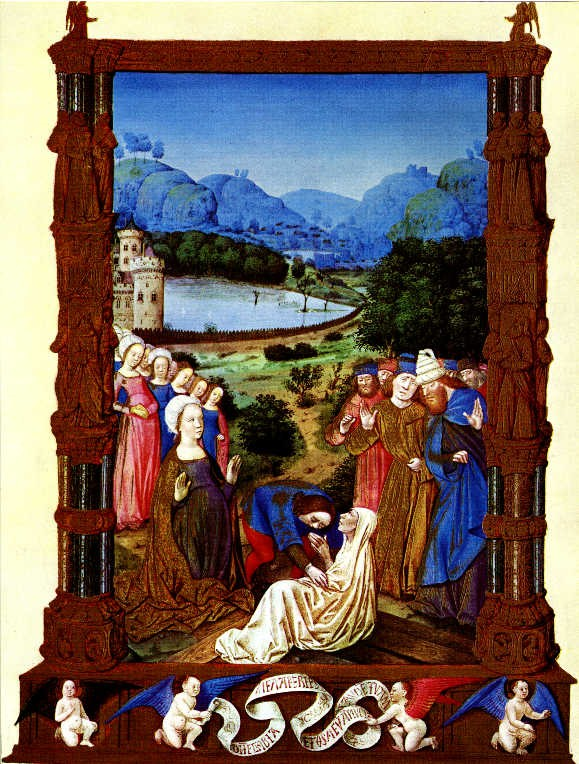
The proving of the True Cross, Jean Colombe in the Très Riches Heures

Theodoret (died c. 457) in his Ecclesiastical History Chapter xvii gives what would become the standard version of the finding of the True Cross:

When the empress beheld the place where the Saviour suffered, she immediately ordered the idolatrous temple, which had been there erected, to be destroyed, and the very earth on which it stood to be removed. When the tomb, which had been so long concealed, was discovered, three crosses were seen buried near the Lord's sepulchre. All held it as certain that one of these crosses was that of our Lord Jesus Christ, and that the other two were those of the thieves who were crucified with Him. Yet they could not discern to which of the three the Body of the Lord had been brought nigh, and which had received the outpouring of His precious Blood. But the wise and holy Macarius, the president of the city, resolved this question in the following manner. He caused a lady of rank, who had been long suffering from disease, to be touched by each of the crosses, with earnest prayer, and thus discerned the virtue residing in that of the Saviour. For the instant this cross was brought near the lady, it expelled the sore disease, and made her whole.

With the Cross were also found the Holy Nails, which Helena took with her back to Constantinople. According to Theodoret, "She had part of the cross of our Saviour conveyed to the palace. The rest was enclosed in a covering of silver, and committed to the care of the bishop of the city, whom she exhorted to preserve it carefully, in order that it might be transmitted uninjured to posterity."

=== Syriac tradition ===
Another popular ancient version from the Syriac tradition replaced Helena with a fictitious first-century empress named Protonike, who is said to be the wife of emperor Claudius. This story, which originated in Edessa in the 430s, was transmitted in the so-called Doctrina Addai, which was believed to be written by Thaddeus of Edessa (Addai in Syriac texts), one of the seventy disciples. The narrative retrojected the Helena version to the first century. In the story, Protonike traveled to Jerusalem after she met Simon Peter in Rome. She was shown around the city by James, brother of Jesus, until she discovered the cross after it healed her daughter of some illness. She then converted to Christianity and had a church built on Golgotha. Aside from the Syriac tradition, the Protonike version was also cited by Armenian sources.

=== Catholic commemoration ===
According to the 1955 Roman Catholic Marian Missal, Helena went to Jerusalem to search for the True Cross and found it 14 September 320. In the 8th century, the Feast of the Finding was transferred to 3 May and 14 September became the celebration of the "Exaltation of the Cross", the commemoration of a victory over the Persians by the Byzantine emperor Heraclius, as a result of which the relic was recovered and returned to Jerusalem.

== The True Cross in Jerusalem ==
=== Late antiquity ===
The silver reliquary that was left at the Basilica of the Holy Sepulchre in care of the bishop of Jerusalem was exhibited periodically to the faithful. In the 380s a nun named Egeria who was travelling on pilgrimage described the veneration of the True Cross at Jerusalem in a long letter known as her Itinerary (Latin: Itinerarium Egeriae), which she sent back to her convent:

Then a chair is placed for the bishop in Golgotha behind the [liturgical] Cross, which is now standing; the bishop duly takes his seat in the chair, and a table covered with a linen cloth is placed before him; the deacons stand round the table, and a silver-gilt casket is brought in which is the holy wood of the Cross. The casket is opened and [the wood] is taken out, and both the wood of the Cross and the title are placed upon the table. Now, when it has been put upon the table, the bishop, as he sits, holds the extremities of the sacred wood firmly in his hands, while the deacons who stand around guard it. It is guarded thus because the custom is that the people, both faithful and catechumens, come one by one and, bowing down at the table, kiss the sacred wood and pass through. And because, I know not when, some one is said to have bitten off and stolen a portion of the sacred wood, it is thus guarded by the deacons who stand around, lest any one approaching should venture to do so again. And as all the people pass by one by one, all bowing themselves, they touch the Cross and the title, first with their foreheads and then with their eyes; then they kiss the Cross and pass through, but none lays his hand upon it to touch it. When they have kissed the Cross and have passed through, a deacon stands holding the ring of Solomon and the horn from which the kings were anointed; they kiss the horn also and gaze at the ring...

Before long, but perhaps not until after the visit of Egeria, it was possible also to venerate the crown of thorns, the pillar at which Christ was scourged, and the lance that pierced his side.

=== The Perso-Byzantine Wars ===
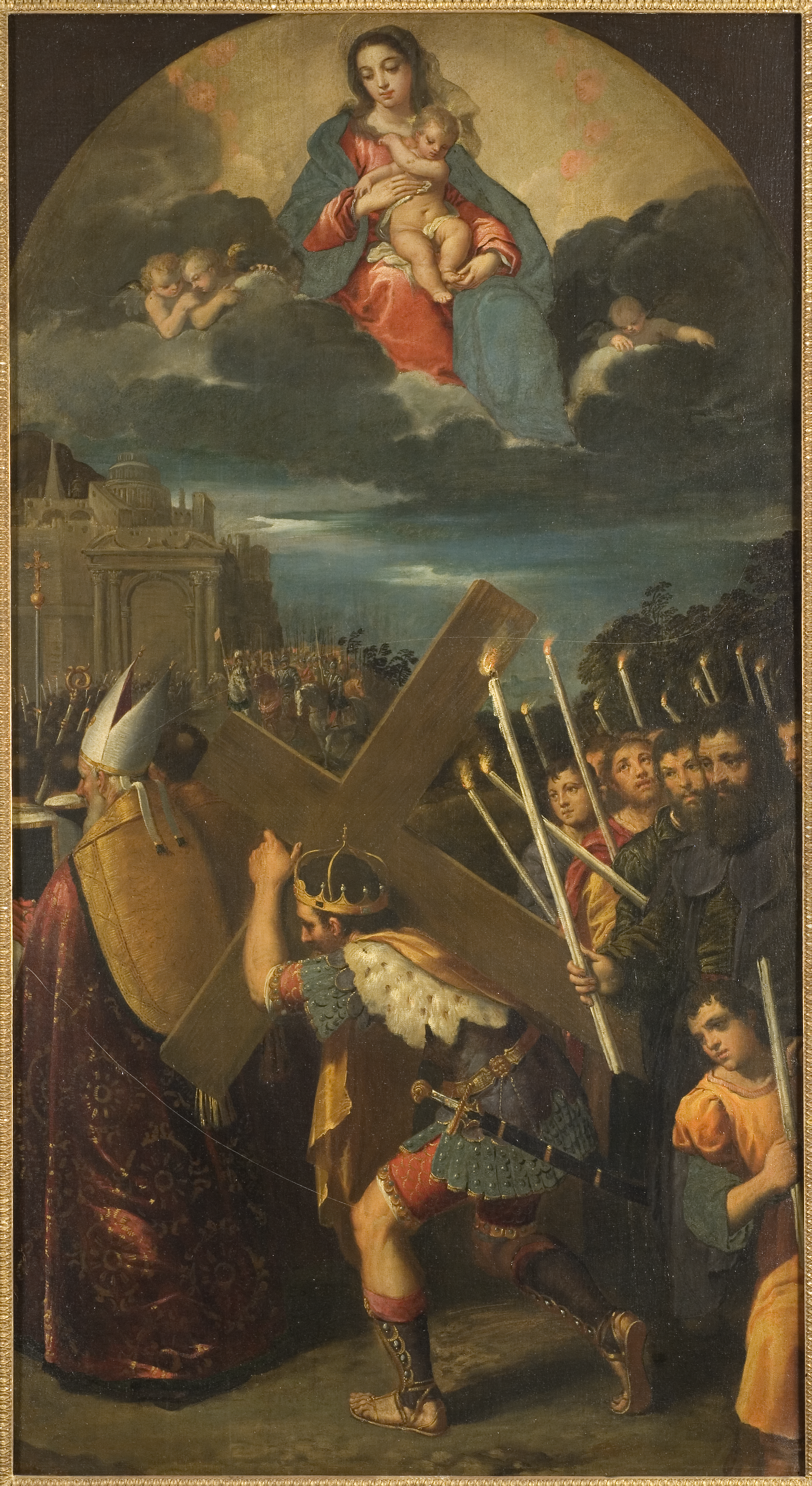
Anachronistic painting depicting Byzantine Emperor Heraclius carrying the True Cross back to Jerusalem, Nationalmuseum

During the Byzantine–Sasanian War of 602–628, the Sasanian Shah Khosrow II removed the part of the cross held in Jerusalem as a trophy after he captured the city in 614. Thirteen years later, in 628, the Byzantine Emperor Heraclius defeated Khosrow and regained the relic from Shahrbaraz. He placed the cross in Constantinople at first, before restoring it to Jerusalem on 21 March 630. Some scholars disagree with this narrative, with Constantin Zuckerman going as far as to suggest that the True Cross was actually lost by the Persians and that the wood contained in the allegedly still sealed reliquary brought to Jerusalem by Heraclius in 629 was a fake. In his analysis, the hoax was designed to serve the political purposes of both Heraclius and his former foe, recently turned ally and father-in-law, the Persian general and soon-king Shahrbaraz.

=== Islamic rule and the Crusades ===
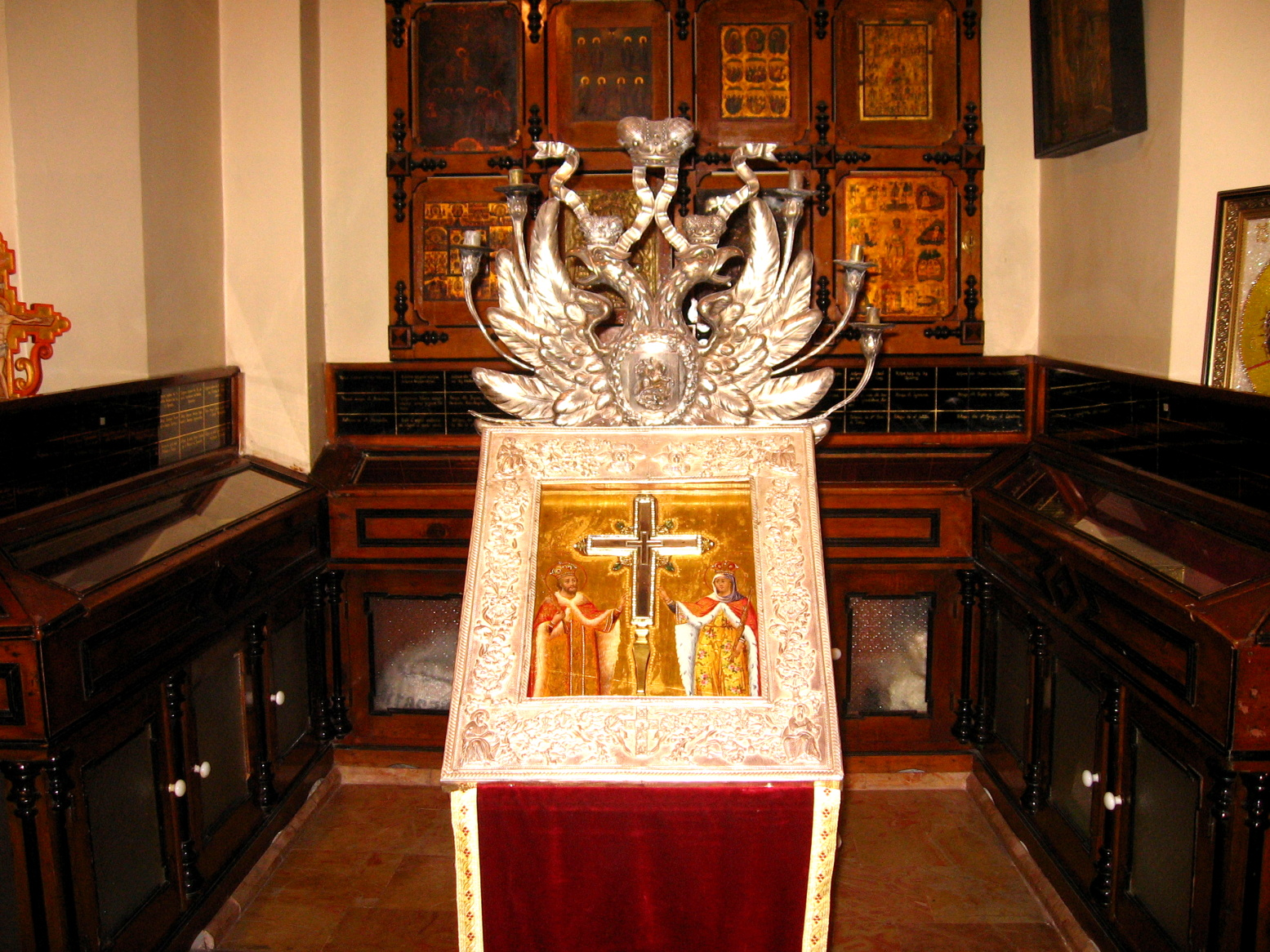
Reliquary of the True Cross at the Church of the Holy Sepulchre, Jerusalem

After the First Muslim conquest of Jerusalem in 638, Heraclius retrieved the True Cross but did not attempt to retake the city.

Around 1009, the year in which Fatimid caliph Al-Hakim bi-Amr Allah ordered the destruction of the Church of the Holy Sepulchre, Christians in Jerusalem hid part of the cross and it remained hidden until the city was taken by the European soldiers of the First Crusade. Arnulf Malecorne, the first Latin patriarch of Jerusalem, had the Greek Orthodox priests who were supposedly in possession of the Cross tortured in order to reveal its location. The relic that Arnulf recovered was a small fragment of wood embedded in a golden cross, and it became the most sacred relic of the Kingdom of Jerusalem, with none of the controversy that had followed their discovery of the Holy Lance in Antioch. Displayed in a jewel-encrusted housing of gold and silver, it was housed in a northern chapel at the Church of the Holy Sepulchre, overseen by its canons and protected by its knights. A second chapel beside it was overseen by the Syrian Orthodox and displayed another reliquary holding their fragment of the cross. The Latin fragment of the cross was repeatedly carried into battle against the Muslims.

Over the course of each liturgical calendar, the Latin patriarch would oversee mass at the various churches around Jerusalem corresponding to the part of Jesus's life being celebrated. The celebrations of Holy Week closely involved the Holy Sepulchre and its fragment of the True Cross. During lauds on each Good Friday, the Latin relic was carried across the church to the chapel of Calvary on its south side, the supposed site of Jesus's crucifixion, and then venerated by the barefoot patriarch, the sepulchre's canons, and the assembled pilgrims until sext. Prior to the liturgy on Holy Saturday, four pilgrims selected by the patriarch—preceded by a thurifer and 2 acolytes—carried the Latin relic from its chapel to the edicule of the Holy Sepulchre while the congregation waited with unlit candles. A New Fire would "spontaneously" light within the sepulchre. The crossbearer then would light his own candle from it, transit the entire church, and light the candle of the waiting patriarch. The candles of the canons and then the congregation were then lit from one to another, gradually filling the church with light.

After King Baldwin I of Jerusalem presented King Sigurd I of Norway with a splinter of the True Cross following the Norwegian Crusade in 1110, the Cross was captured by Saladin during the Battle of Hattin in 1187. While some Christian rulers like Richard the Lionheart of England, the Byzantine emperor Isaac II, and King Tamar of Georgia sought to ransom it from Saladin, the cross was not returned. In 1219 the True Cross was offered to the Knights Templar by Al-Kamil in exchange for lifting the siege of Damietta. The cross was never delivered as Al-Kamil did not, in fact, have it. Subsequently the cross disappeared from historical records. The True Cross was last seen in the city of Damascus following the Battle of Hattin.

=== 21st-century status ===
The Greek Orthodox church presents a small True Cross relic shown in the Greek Treasury within the Church of the Holy Sepulchre at the foot of Golgotha. The Syriac Orthodox Church also claims a small relic of the True Cross (held in the Monastery of Saint Mark in Jerusalem), as does the Armenian Apostolic Church (in Armenia). According to the 15th-century Book of Ṭeff Grains, the emperor Dawit I received four fragments of the True Cross around the year 1400 from Coptic Christians as thanks for his protection. The Ethiopian Orthodox Tewahedo Church claims these relics are still held at either Egziabher Ab or Tekle Maryam, two monasteries near the former imperial cemetery on Amba Geshen.

== Dispersion of relics ==
An inscription of 359 found at Tixter, in the neighbourhood of Sétif in Mauretania (in today Algeria), was said to mention, in an enumeration of relics, a fragment of the True Cross, according to an entry in Roman Miscellanies, X, 441.

Fragments of the Cross were broken up, and the pieces were widely distributed; in 348, in one of his Catecheses, Cyril of Jerusalem remarked that the "whole Earth is full of the relics of the Cross of Christ" and, in another, "The holy wood of the Cross bears witness, seen among us to this day, and from this place now almost filling the whole world, by means of those who in faith take portions from it." Egeria's account testifies to how highly these relics of the crucifixion were prized. John Chrysostom relates that fragments of the True Cross were kept in golden reliquaries, "which men reverently wear upon their persons." Even two Latin inscriptions around 350 from today's Algeria testify to the keeping and admiration of small particles of the cross. Around the year 455, Juvenal Patriarch of Jerusalem sent to Pope Leo I a fragment of the "precious wood", according to the Letters of Pope Leo. A portion of the cross was taken to Rome in the seventh century by Pope Sergius I, who was of Byzantine origin. "In the small part is power of the whole cross", says an inscription in the Felix Basilica of Nola, built by bishop Paulinus at the beginning of 5th century. The cross particle was inserted in the altar.

The Old English poem Dream of the Rood mentions the finding of the cross and the beginning of the tradition of the veneration of its relics. The Anglo-Saxon Chronicle also talks of King Alfred receiving a fragment of the cross from Pope Marinus (see: Annal Alfred the Great, year 883). Although it is possible, the poem need not be referring to this specific relic or have this incident as the reason for its composition. However, there is a later source that speaks of a bequest made to the 'Holy Cross' at Shaftesbury Abbey in Dorset; Shaftesbury abbey was founded by King Alfred, supported with a large portion of state funds and given to the charge of his own daughter when he was alive—it is conceivable that if Alfred really received this relic, that he may have given it to the care of the nuns at Shaftesbury.

Most of the very small relics of the True Cross in Europe came from Constantinople. The city was captured and sacked by the Fourth Crusade in 1204. The Chronica Regia Coloniensis relates that "After the conquest of the city Constantinople inestimable wealth was found: incomparably precious jewels and also a part of the cross of the Lord, which Helena transferred from Jerusalem and [which] was decorated with gold and precious jewels. There it attained [the] highest admiration. It was carved up by the present bishops and was divided with other very precious relics among the knights; later, after their return to the homeland, it was donated to churches and monasteries." (Note: Latin: Capta igitur urbe, divitiae repperiuntur inestimabiles, lapides preciosissime et incomparabiles, pars etiam ligni dominici, quod per Helenam de Iherosolimis translatum, auro et gemmis precioses insignitum in maxima illic veneratione habebatur, ab episcopis qui presentes aderant incisum, ab aliis preciosissimis reliquis per nobilis quosque partitur, et postea eis revertentibus ad natale solum, per ecclesias et cenobia distrbuitur. German: Nach der Eroberung der Stadt wurden unschätzbare Reichtümer gefunden, unvergleichlich kostbare Edelsteine und auch ein Teil des Kreuzes des Herrn, das, von Helena aus Jerusalem überführt und mit Gold und kostbaren Edelsteinen geschmückt, dort höchste Verehrung erfuhr. Es wurde von den anwesenden Bischöfen zerstückelt und mit anderen sehr kostbaren Reliquien unter die Ritter aufgeteilt; später, nach deren Rückkehr in die Heimat, wurde es Kirchen und Klöstern gestiftet.) (Note: See also the discussion of the relics of the True Cross on the German Wikipedia at de:Diskussion:Kreuzerhöhung.) The French knight Robert de Clari wrote that "within this chapel were found many precious relics; for therein were found two pieces of the True Cross, as thick as a man's leg and a fathom in length."

The misplacement of which particular class relics of the Holy Cross (and others in general) belong to, either as a result of confusion or exaggeration; and the outright forgery of relics, was a recurring controversy during the Medieval Age. This happened, often in order to attract pilgrims; or even to facilitate the lucrative practice of simony.

Smyrnakis notes that the largest surviving portion, of 870,760 cubic millimetres, is preserved in the Monastery of Koutloumousiou on Mount Athos, and also mentions the preserved relics in Rome (consisting of 537,587 cubic millimetres), in Brussels (516,090 cubic millimetres), in Venice (445,582 cubic millimetres), in Ghent (436,450 cubic millimetres) and in Paris (237,731 cubic millimetres).

Santo Toribio de Liébana in Spain is also said to hold the largest of these pieces and is one of the most visited Roman Catholic pilgrimage sites. In Asia, the only place where the other part of the True Cross is located is in the Monasterio de Tarlac at San Jose, Tarlac, Philippines.

The Ethiopian Orthodox Tewahedo Church also claims to have the right wing of the true cross buried in the monastery of Gishen Mariam. This piece was gifted by the Venetian Republic to the Ethiopian Empire in the medieval period and remained in the Atse Emperor's personal possession into the 18th century, even being lost in battle, before being buried atop Amba Geshen.

In 2016, a relic of the True Cross held by the Waterford Cathedral in Ireland was radiocarbon-dated to the 11th century by Oxford University.

In February 2020, the Sevastopol district archpriest Sergiy Khalyuta said that a piece of the True Cross was bought by a donor, and was to be placed on board the Russian missile cruiser Moskva, which has a chapel on board. The ship sank in April 2022 during the Russian invasion of Ukraine. After the sinking, there was speculation that the fragment may have gone down with the ship.

=== Debate on the total volume of the relics ===
By the end of the Middle Ages so many churches claimed to possess relics of the True Cross, that John Calvin famously remarked that there was enough wood in them to fill a ship:

There is no abbey so poor as not to have a specimen. In some places there are large fragments, as at the Holy Chapel in Paris, at Poitiers, and at Rome, where a good-sized crucifix is said to have been made of it. In brief, if all the pieces that could be found were collected together, they would make a big ship-load. Yet the Gospel testifies that a single man was able to carry it.

— Calvin, Treatise on Relics

Conflicting with this is the finding of Charles Rohault de Fleury, who, in his Mémoire sur les instruments de la Passion of 1870, made a study of the relics in reference to the criticisms of those like Calvin and Erasmus. He drew up a catalogue of all known relics of the True Cross showing that, in spite of what various authors have claimed, the fragments of the Cross brought together again would not reach one-third that of a cross which has been supposed to have been three or four metres (9.8 or 13.1 feet) in height, with transverse branch of two metres (6.6 feet) wide, proportions not at all abnormal. He calculated: supposing the Cross to have been of pine-wood (based on his microscopic analysis of the fragments) and giving it a weight of about seventy-five kilogrammes, we find the original volume of the cross to be 0.178 cubic metres (6.286 cubic feet). The total known volume of known relics of the True Cross, according to his catalogue, amounts to approximately 0.004 cubic metres (0.141 cubic feet) (more specifically 3,942,000 cubic millimetres), leaving a volume of 0.174 m^{3} (6.145 cu ft), almost 98%, lost, destroyed, or from which is otherwise unaccounted. Four cross particles – of ten particles with surviving documentary provenances by Byzantine emperors – from European churches, i.e. Santa Croce in Rome, Caravaca de la Cruz, Notre Dame, Paris, Pisa Cathedral and Florence Cathedral, were microscopically examined. "The pieces came all together from olive."

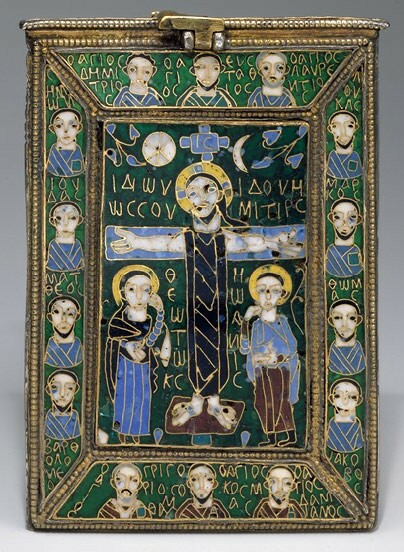
An enamelled silver reliquary of the True Cross from Constantinople, c. 800

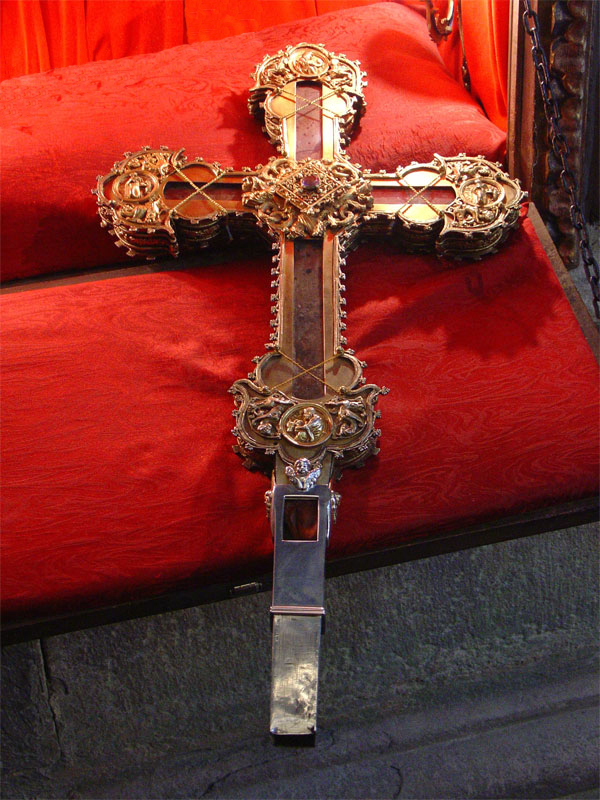
One of the largest purported fragments of the True Cross is at Santo Toribio de Liébana in Spain (photo by F. J. Díez Martín)

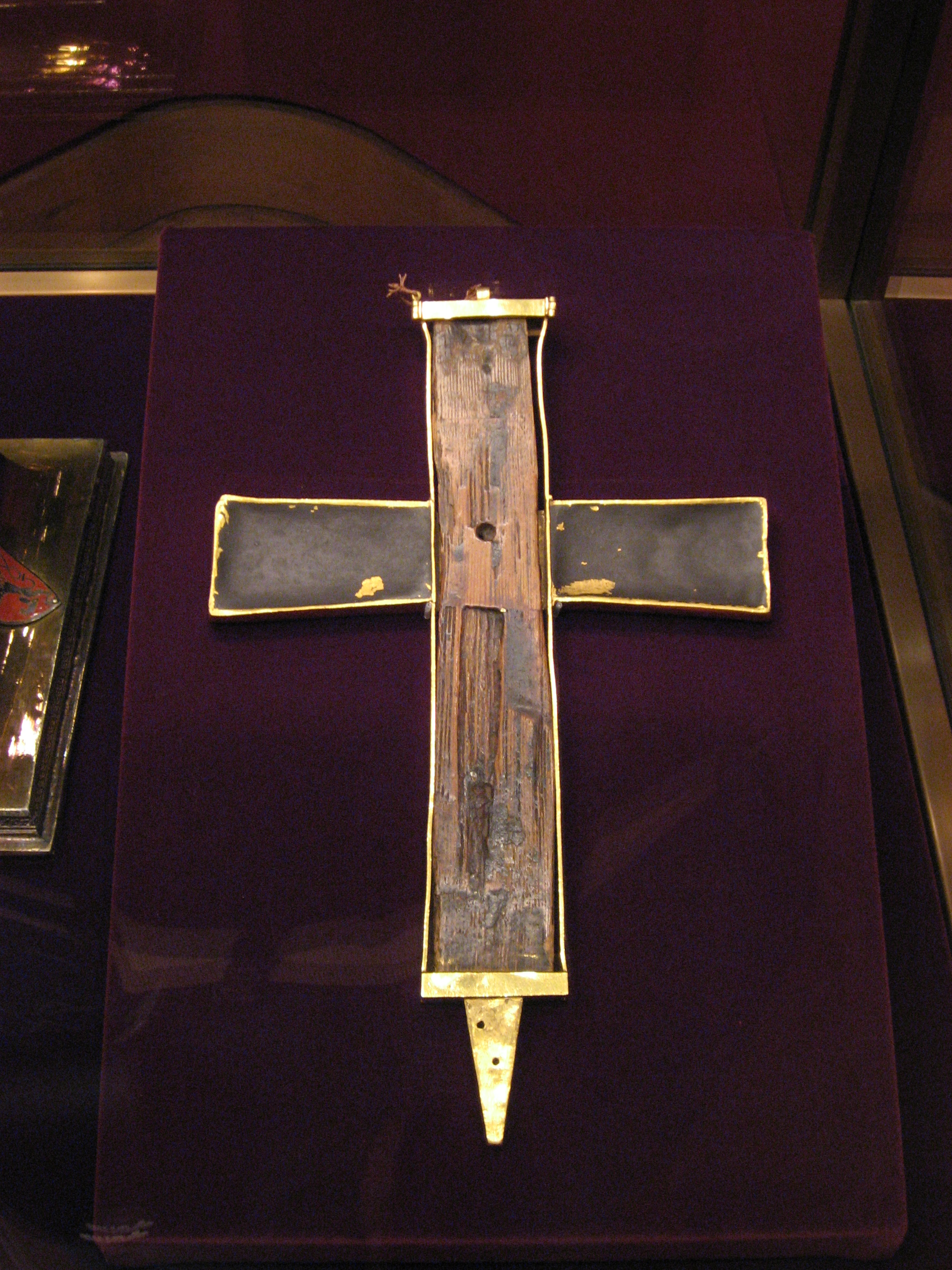
A "Kreuzpartikel" or fragment of True Cross in the Schatzkammer (Vienna)

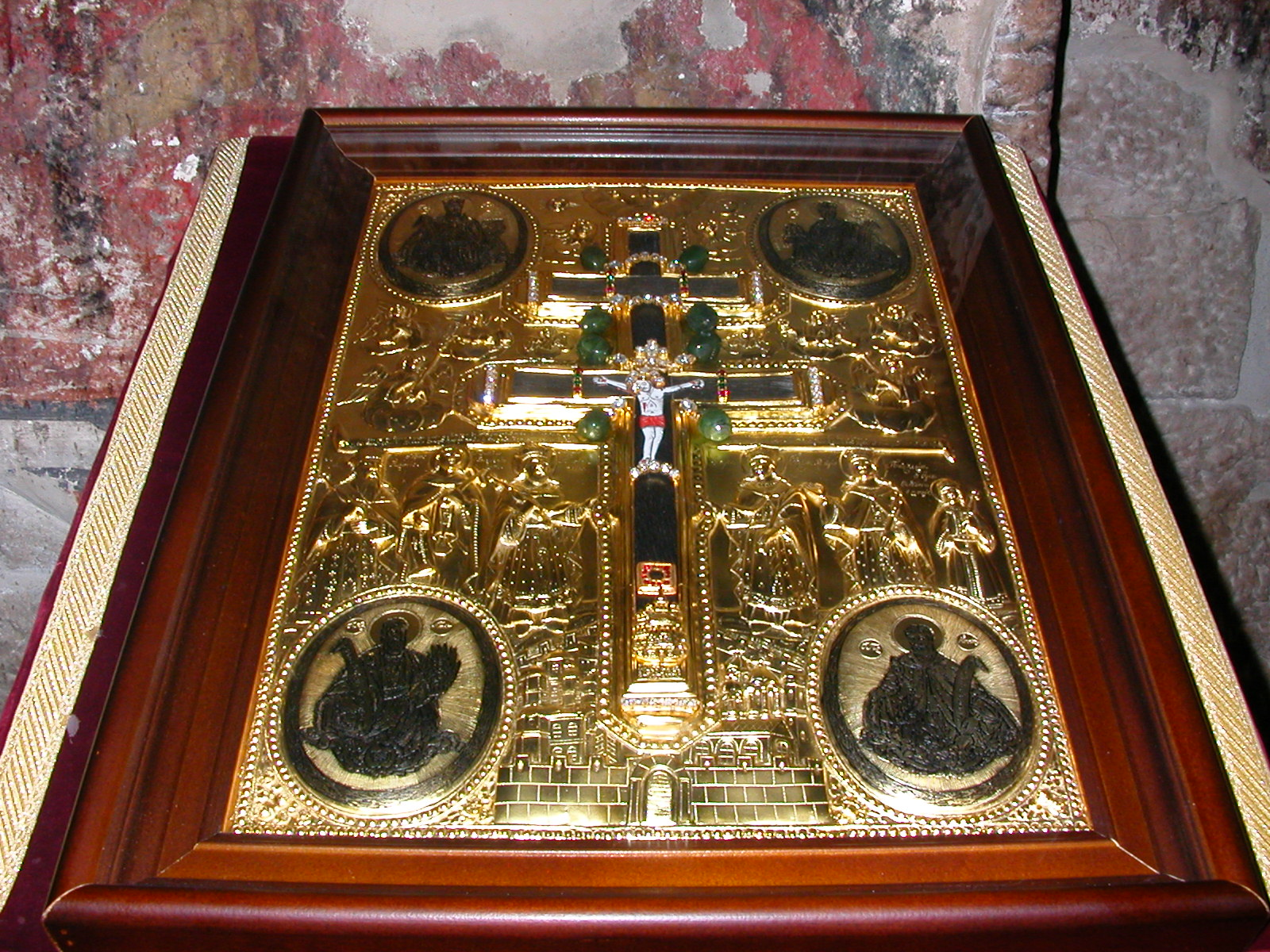
Fragments of True Cross in the Serbian Orthodox Monastery of Visoki Dečani

== Veneration ==
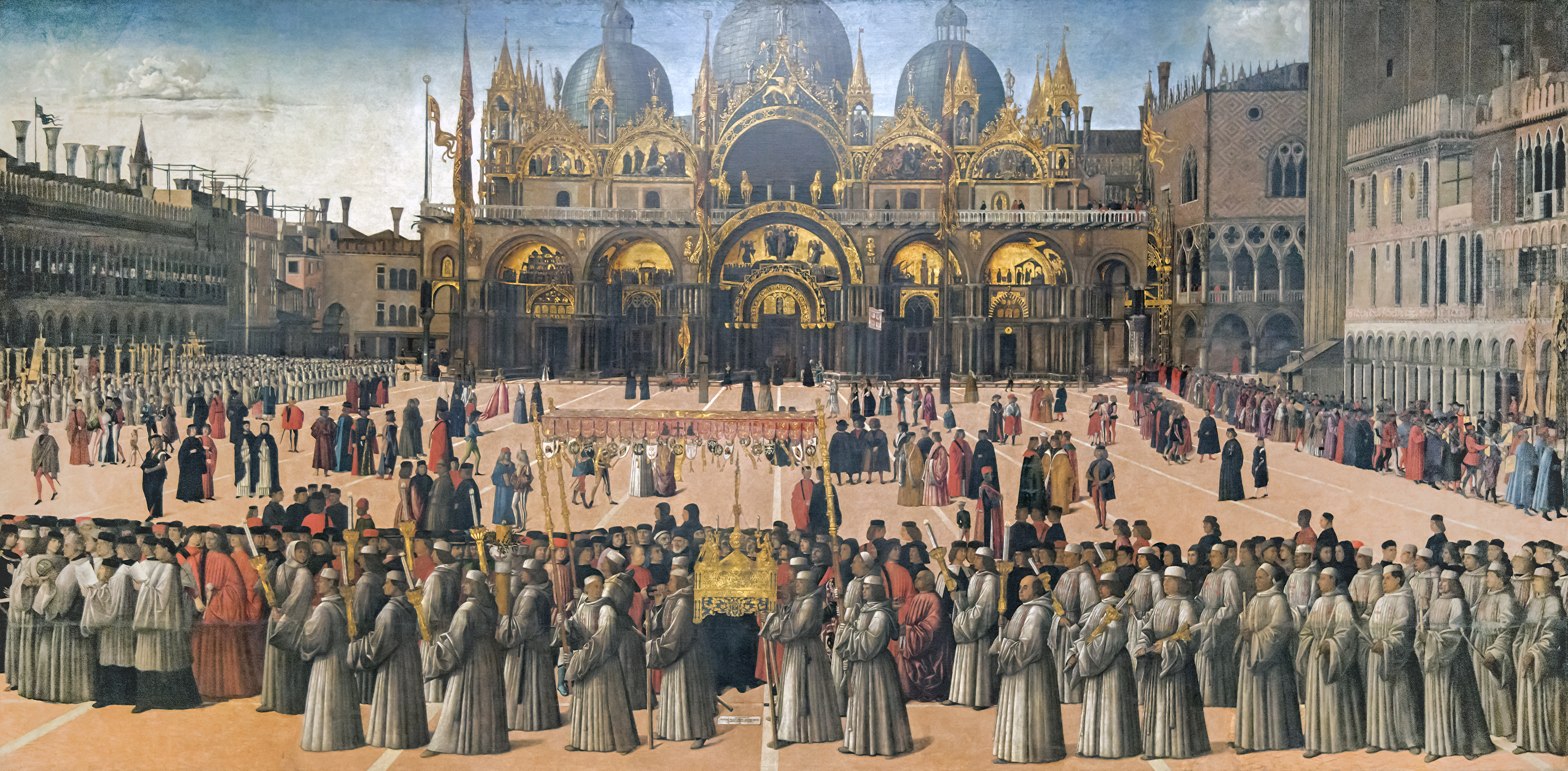
A relic of the True Cross being carried in procession through the Piazza San Marco, Venice. Gentile Bellini 15th century.

John Chrysostom wrote homilies on the three crosses:

Kings removing their diadems take up the cross, the symbol of their Saviour's death; on the purple, the cross; in their prayers, the cross; on their armour, the cross; on the holy table, the cross; throughout the universe, the cross. The cross shines brighter than the sun.

The Catholic, Eastern Orthodox, Oriental Orthodox, Anglican and some Protestant churches celebrate the Feast of the Exaltation of the Cross on September 14, the anniversary of the dedication of the Church of the Holy Sepulchre. In later centuries, these celebrations also included commemoration of the rescue of the True Cross from the Persians in 628. In the Galician usage, beginning about the seventh century, the Feast of the Cross was celebrated on May 3. According to the Catholic Encyclopedia, when the Galician and Roman practices were combined, the September date, for which the Vatican adopted the official name "Triumph of the Cross" in 1963, was used to commemorate the rescue from the Persians and the May date was kept as the "Invention of the True Cross" to commemorate the finding. (Note: This sense of the word "invention" is the less common one—borrowed directly from its Latin etymon "inventiō"—of anything which has been found or come across, rather than something created entirely new.) The September date is often referred to in the West as Holy Cross Day; the May date (see also Roodmas) was dropped from the liturgical calendar of the Catholic Church in 1960 when the Roman Breviary was reformed by Pope John XXIII. The Orthodox still commemorate both events on September 14, one of the Twelve Great Feasts of the liturgical year, and the Procession of the Venerable Wood of the Cross on 1 August, the day on which the relics of the True Cross would be carried through the streets of Constantinople to bless the city, as it was believed to bring health and cleanse the air and houses from sickness. The 10th century Synaxarion of Constantinople describes how beforehand the True Cross would be transported from the Great Palace of Constantinople to the Hagia Sophia on June 30, would be placed next to the baptistery and then be worshipped by the bishops.

In addition to celebrations on fixed days, there are certain days of the variable cycle when the Cross is celebrated. The Catholic Church has a formal Adoration of the Cross during the services for Good Friday. In Eastern Orthodox churches everywhere, a replica of the cross is brought out in procession during Matins of Great and Holy Friday for the people to venerate. The Orthodox also celebrate an additional Veneration of the Cross on the third Sunday of Great Lent.

== Image gallery ==
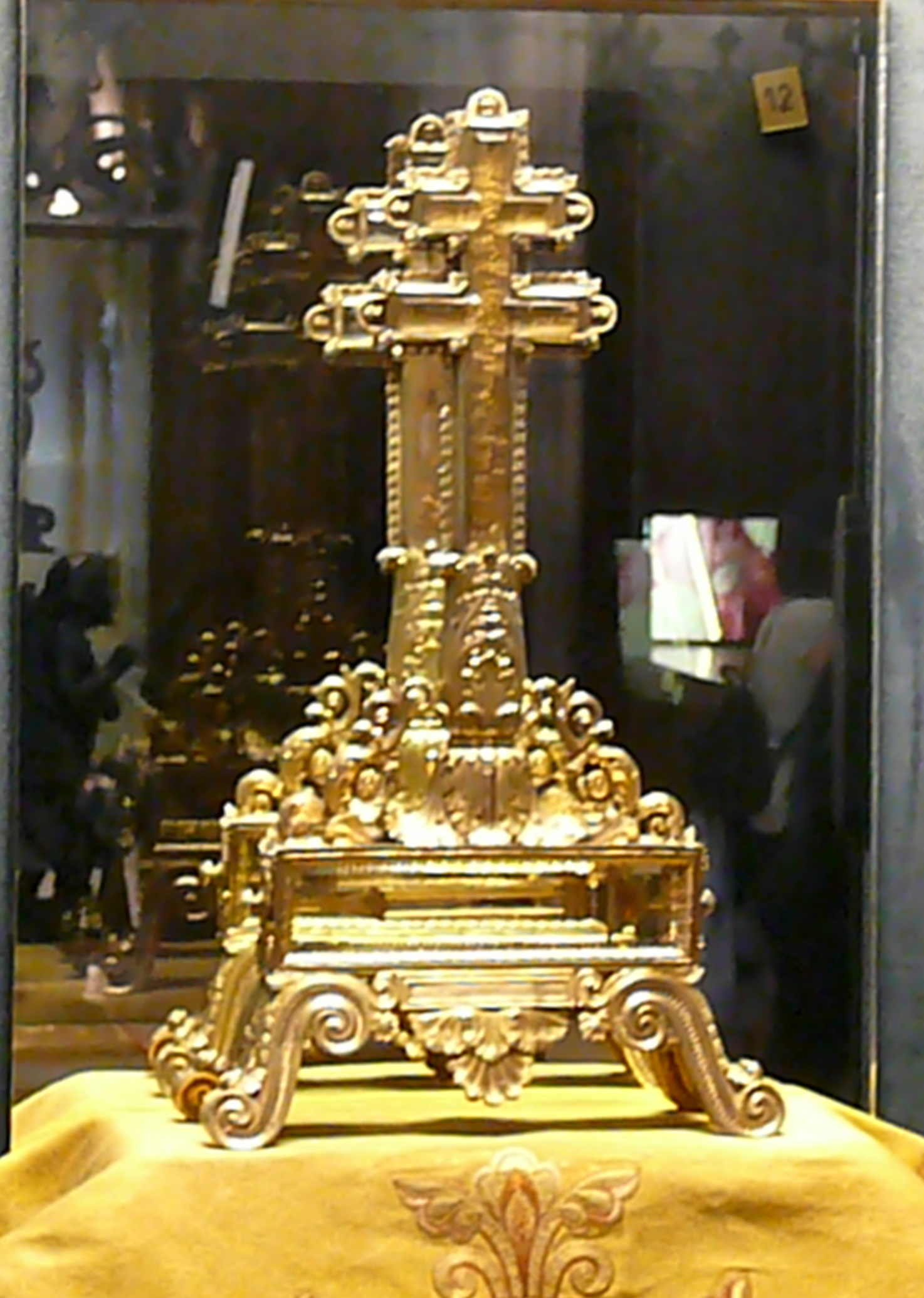
Reliquary of the True Cross at Notre-Dame de Paris

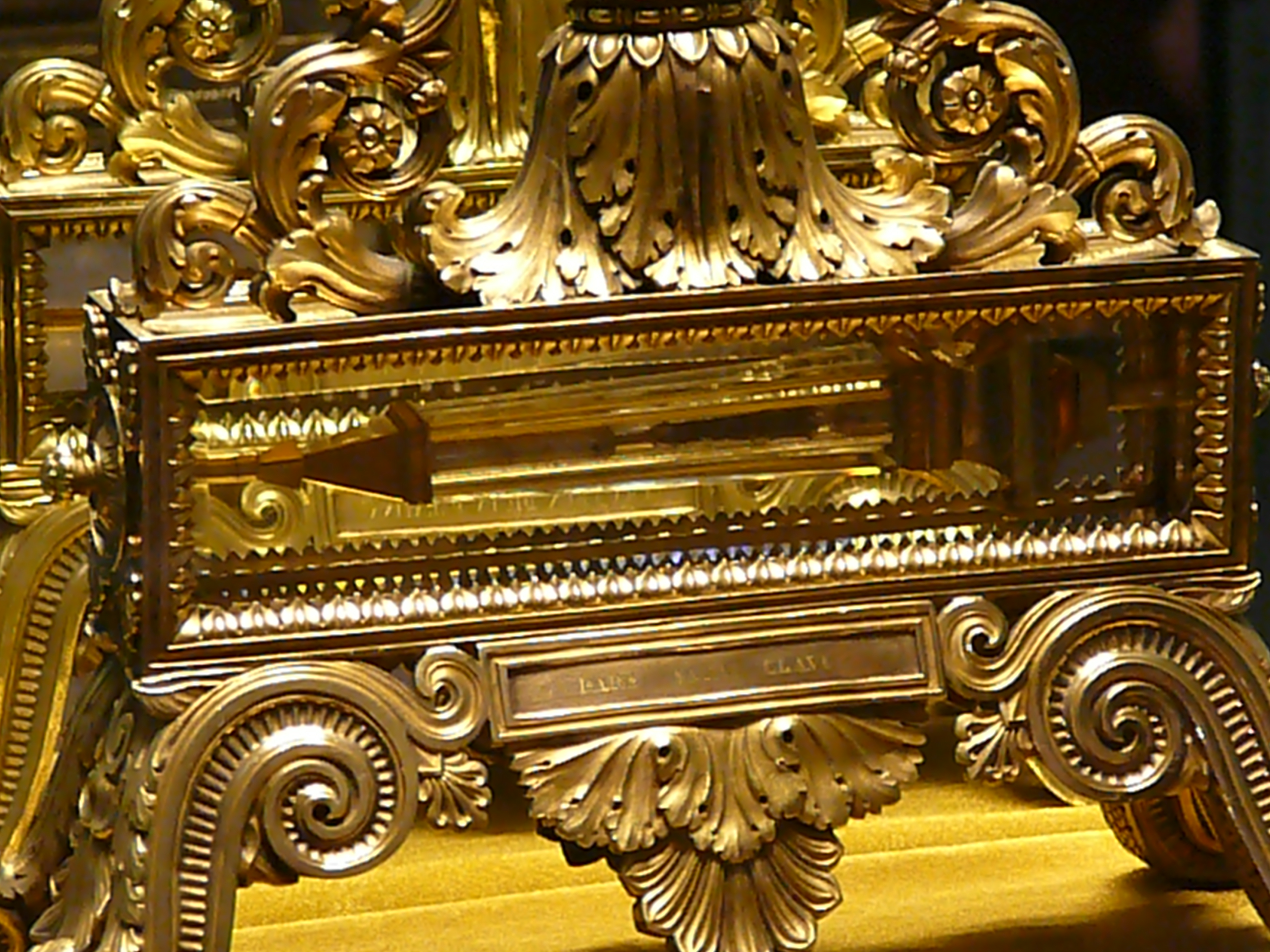
Base of the reliquary with one of the Holy Nails

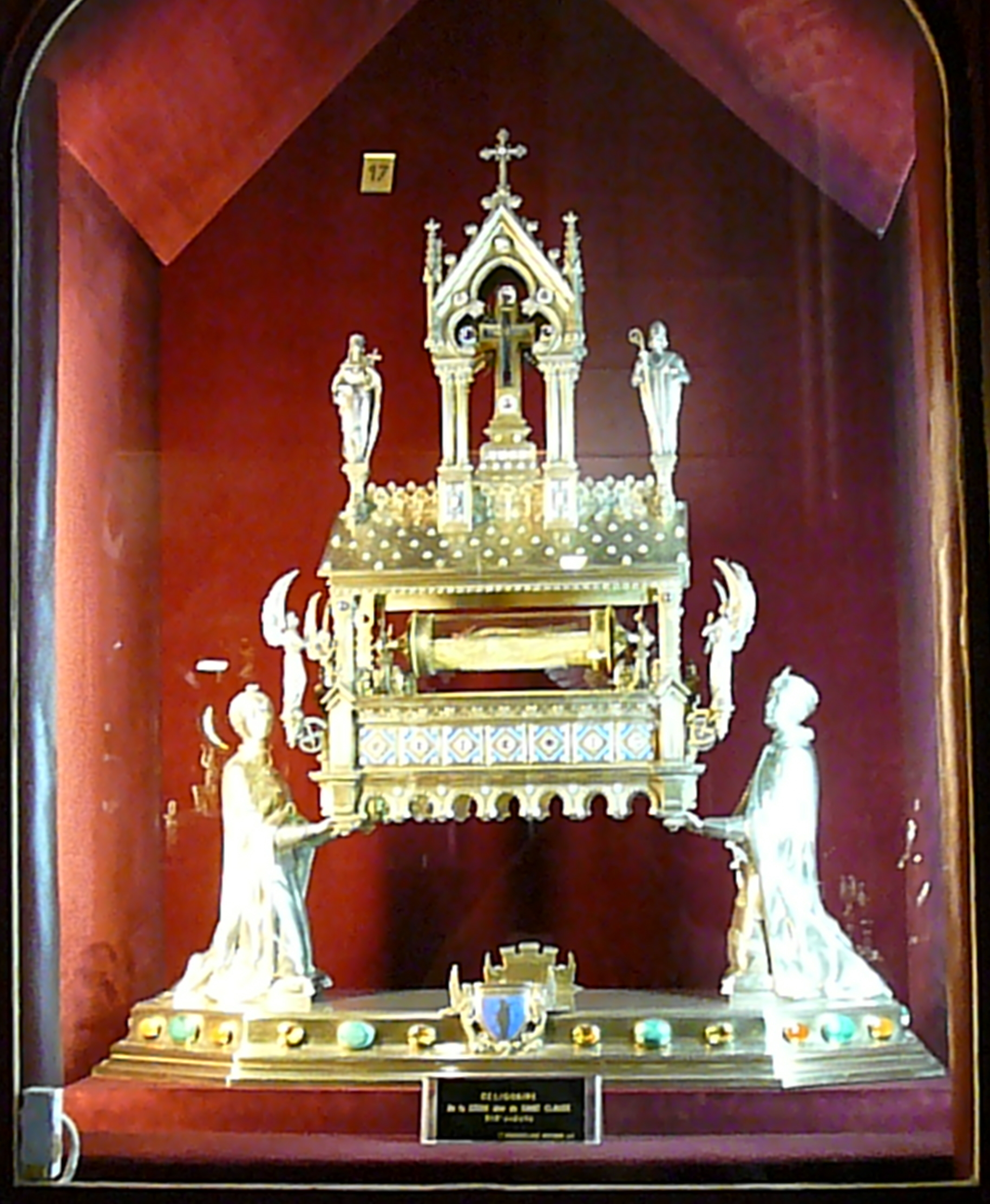
A second reliquary with another nail at Notre-Dame de Paris

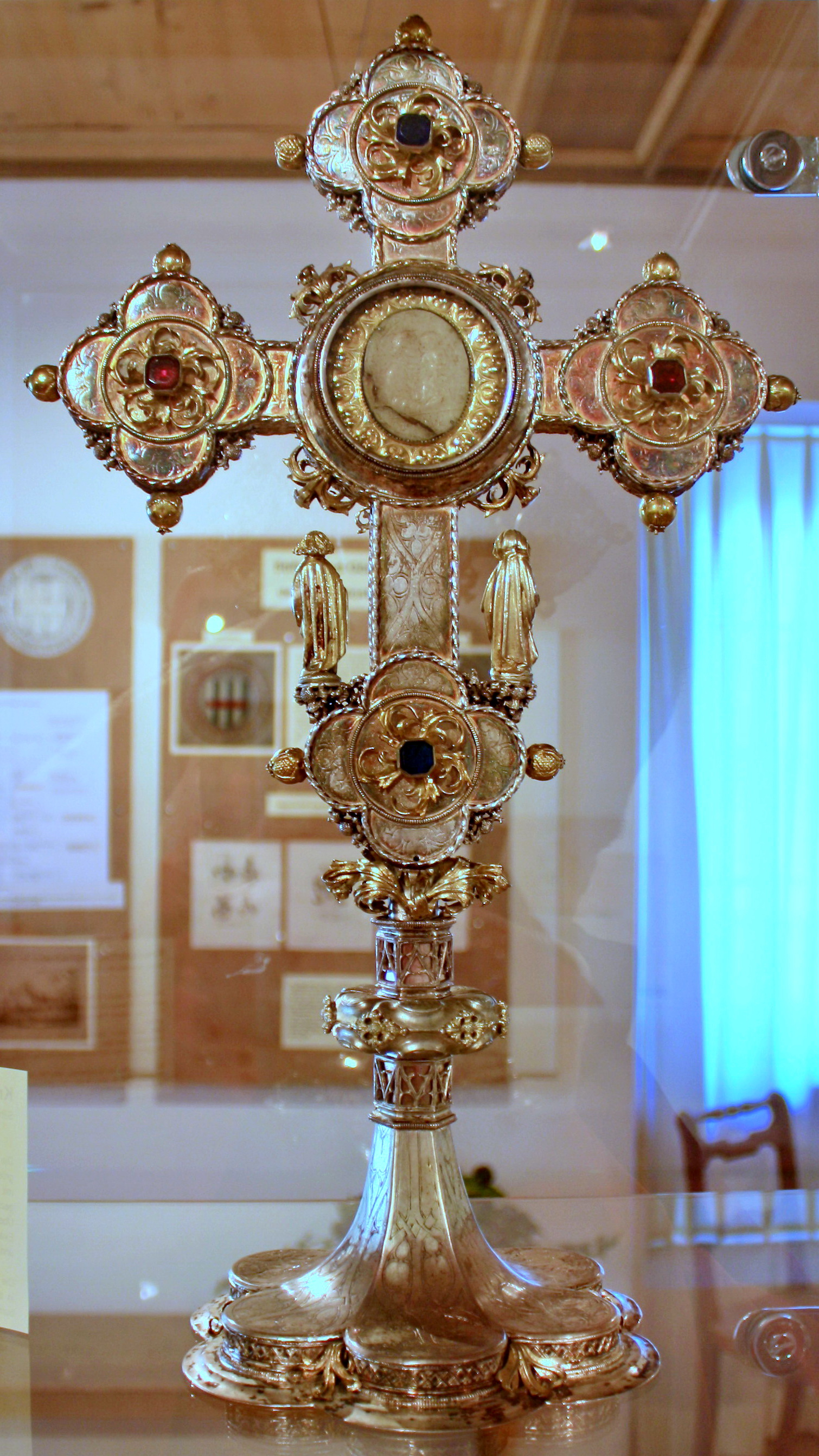
A reliquary of the True Cross from the former Premonstratensian monastery in Rüti, Switzerland

== See also ==
- Crucifixion
- Gospel of Nicodemus, apocryphal text
- Holy Grail, motif from the Arthurian literature
- Holyrood (cross)
- Île de la Cité
- Instrument of Jesus' crucifixion
- Santa Croce in Gerusalemme
- Stavelot Triptych
- Tree of Jesse
- Relics associated with Jesus
  - Arma Christi
  - Holy Chalice, chalice used at the Last Supper
  - Holy Lance and Holy Sponge
  - Shroud of Turin
  - Titulus Crucis
  - Holy Prepuce

== Bibliography ==
- Ciggaar, Krijnie; Teule, Herman (1996). East and West in the Crusader States. Peeters. ISBN 90-429-1287-1.
- Cynewulf (1904). The Elene of Cynewulf. Yale Studies in English. Vol. 21. Translated by Holt, Lucius Hudson.
- Cyril of Jerusalem; et al. (1894). Catechetical Lectures [and] Select Orations. A Select Library of the Christian Church: Nicene and Post-Nicene Fathers, 2nd ser., vol. VII. Translated by Gifford, Edward Hamilton; et al. New York: Christian Literature Publishing.
- Drijvers, Jan Willem (1992). "Helena Augusta, the Mother of Constantine the Great and the Legend of Her Finding of the True Cross".
- Duval, Yvette (1982). Loca Sanctorum Africae: Le Culte des Martyrs en Afrique du IVe au VIIe Siècle (in French). Rome, Italy: Ecole française de Rome.
- Egeria (1919). The Pilgrimage of Etheria. Translated by McClure, M. L.; C. L. Feltoe. London, England: Society for Promoting Christian Knowledge.
- Eusebius (1890). Church History, Life of Constantine the Great, and Oration in Praise of Constantine. A Select Library of the Christian Church: Nicene and Post-Nicene Fathers, 2nd ser., vol. I. Translated by Richardson, Ernest Cushing; et al. New York: Christian Literature Publishing.
- Hamilton, Bernard; Jotischky, Andrew (2020). Latin and Greek Monasticism in the Crusader States. Cambridge: Cambridge University Press. ISBN 978-0-521-83638-8.
- Herzog, Sadja (1969). "Gossart, Italy, and the National Gallery's Saint Jerome Penitent". Report and Studies in the History of Art. Vol. 3. National Gallery of Art. pp. 67–70. JSTOR 42618036..
- de Voragine, Jacobus (1900). "The Life of Adam". The Golden Legend... Vol. 1. Translated by Ellis, Frederick Startridge; et al. London, England: J. M. Dent & Company.
- de Voragine, Jacobus (1900). "Of the Invention of the Holy Cross & First of This Word Invention". The Golden Legend... Vol. 3. Translated by Ellis, Frederick Startridge; et al. London, England: J. M. Dent & Company.
- Kittel, Gerhard; et al., eds. (1969). Theological Dictionary of the New Testament. Vol. 6. Wm. B. Eerdmans. ISBN 9780802822482.
- Madden, Thomas F. (2005). The New Concise History of the Crusades. Rowman & Littlefield. ISBN 0-7425-3822-2.
- Malouf, Amin (1983). The Crusades through Arab Eyes.
- Marucchi, Orazio; Cabrol, Fernand; Thurston, Herbert (1908). "Cross and Crucifix" . Catholic Encyclopedia. Vol. 4.
- Meerson, Michael; et al. (2014). Toledot Yeshu: The Life Story of Jesus. Vol. 1. Tübingen: Mohr Siebeck. ISBN 9783161534812.
- Norwich, John Julius (1988). Byzantium: The Early Centuries. London, England: Guild Publishing.
- Novoderezhkin, Anton (26 February 2020). "Christian Relic, a True Cross Piece, to Be Kept at Russia's Black Sea Fleet Flagship". TASS. Sevastopol.
- Pogossian, Zaroui (2019). "Relics, Rulers, Patronage: The True Cross of Varag and the Church of the Holy Cross of Ałt'amar". The Church of the Holy Cross of Ałt'amar: Politics, Art, Spirituality in the Kingdom of Vaspurakan. Armenian Texts and Studies, vol. 3. Leiden: Brill. pp. 126–206. ISBN 978-90-04-40038-2.
- Robert of Clari (1939). Three Old French Chronicles of the Crusades. Translated by Stone, Edward N. Seattle, Washington: University of Washington.
- Roth, Andrew (15 April 2022). "Loss of Moskva Strikes Serious Blow to Russian Military's Prestige". The Guardian. Archived from the original on 15 April 2022.
- Runciman, Steven (1951). A History of the Crusades. Vol. 1. Cambridge: Cambridge University Press. ISBN 0-521-34770-X..
- Saint-Laurent, Jeanne-Nicole Mellon (2015). Missionary Stories and the Formation of the Syriac Churches. Oakland, California: University of California Press. ISBN 978-0-520-28496-8.
- Smyrnakis, Gerasimos (1903). Το Άγιο Όρος. Αρχαιολογίας κ.λπ., του Αγίου Όρους [The Holy Mountain. Archaeology, etc., of Mt. Athos] (in Greek). Athens, Greece: Anestes Konstandinides.
- Sozomenus (1890). Church History. A Select Library of the Christian Church: Nicene and Post-Nicene Fathers, 2nd ser., vol. II. Translated by Hartranft, Chester D.; et al. New York: Christian Literature Publishing.
- Socrates (1890). Church History. A Select Library of the Christian Church: Nicene and Post-Nicene Fathers, 2nd ser., vol. II. Translated by Zenos, A. C.; et al. New York: Christian Literature Publishing.
- Treadgold, Warren (1997). A History of the Byzantine State and Society. Stanford, California: Stanford University Press. ISBN 0-8047-2630-2.
- Waitz, Georg, ed. (1880). Scriptores Rerum Germanicarum in Usum Scholarum. Monumenta Germaniae Historica (in Latin). Vol. 18. Hannover: Impensis Bibliopolii Hahniani.
- "The Anglo-Saxon Chronicle on Alfred the Great". Source Problems in English History. Translated by White, Albert Beebe; et al. New York: Harper & Brothers. 1915.
- Wiles, Maurice F.; et al. (2001). Studia Patristica: Papers Presented at the Thirteenth International Conference on Patristic Studies Held in Oxford, 1999. Leuven: Peeters. ISBN 978-90-429-0881-9.
- Ziehr, William (1997). Das Kreuz (in German). Stuttgart: Belser.
- Zuckerman, Constantin (2013). "Heraclius and the Return of the Holy Cross". Constructing the Seventh Century. Travaux et Mémoires. Vol. 17. Paris: Association des Amis du Centre d'Histoire et Civilisation de Byzance. ISBN 978-2-916716-45-9.
