= Euzoius of Caesarea =

Christian theologian and bishop of the 4th century

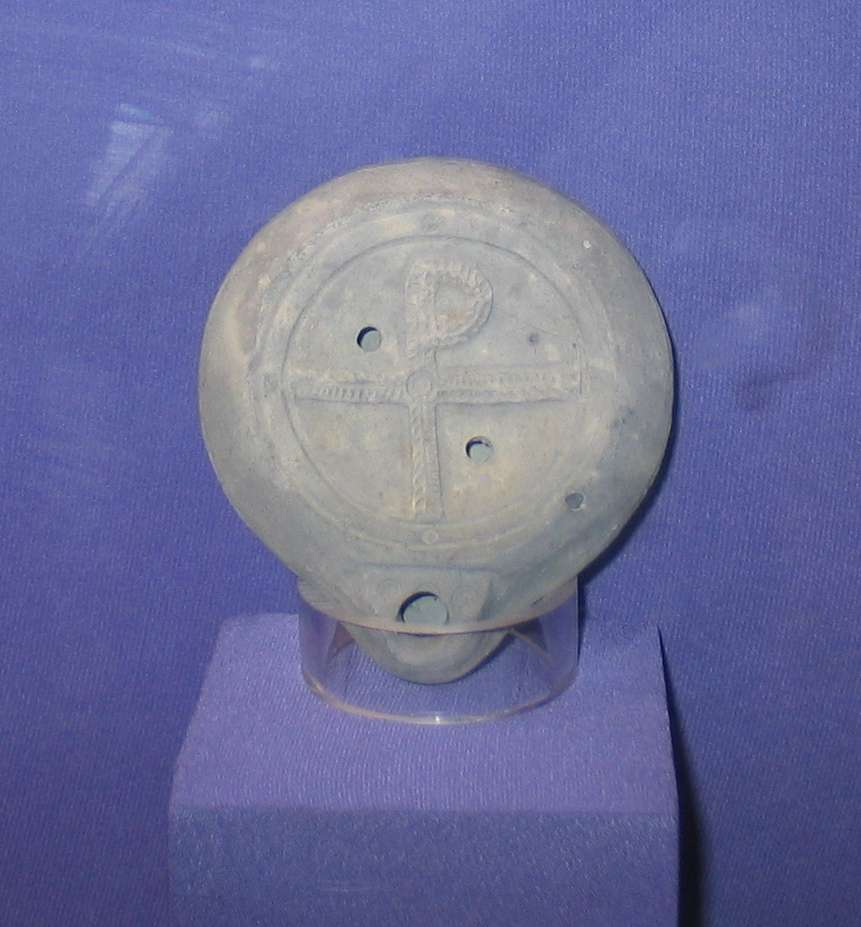
Lamp with staurogram from 4th-century Caesarea Maritima.

Euzoius of Caesarea (Greek: Ευζώιος, romanized: Euzōios; fl. AD 373–379) was a Christian theologian and bishop of the 4th century.

In Jerome's De viris illustribus, he writes that Euzoius was educated alongside Gregory of Nazianzus by "Thespesius the rhetorician" at Caesarea Maritima. In 373 Euzoius became Bishop of Caesarea and he worked to restore its library, copying many papyrus works to parchment. He was expelled from the church during the reign of Theodosius I (r. 379–395). He wrote several treatises, none of which survives.

Titles of the Great Christian Church
Preceded by Gelasius of Caesarea	Bishop of Caesarea; 373–378	Succeeded by Gelasius of Caesarea (second time)
