= Baldwin I (archbishop of Caesarea) =

Archbishop of Caesarea from 1101 to 1108

Baldwin I was the first archbishop of Caesarea and the see's first Latin incumbent. He served from 1101 until 1108.

Baldwin came to the Levant with Godfrey of Bouillon, a leader of the First Crusade. Guibert of Nogent relates that the first archbishop of Caesarea had been an abbot who collected money for his journey by incising a cross in his forehead and claiming it was God's work. He then followed Godfrey to the Levant, but during a fast and general confession in Antioch his conscience forced him to admit to the fraud. He nonetheless went on to become the first abbot of the Abbey of Saint Mary of the Valley of Jehosaphat and then archbishop of Caesarea. The historian Bernard Hamilton notes, however, that King Baldwin I of Jerusalem instead described an abbot named Hugh as the first abbot of Jehosaphat, and that it cannot be ascertained whether Hugh received any money under false pretences.

King Baldwin captured Caesarea Maritima in 1101 and nominated his namesake to be its archbishop. Bishops were not obligated to go to battle, but Baldwin "clearly enjoyed warfare"; along with Gerald, abbot-archbishop of Mount Tabor, he took part in the king's first battle of Ramla in 1101.

Baldwin’s time as archbishop is sparsely documented, especially when compared to the archbishops who followed him. In October 1102, he served both as prosecutor and judge in the council that deposed the Latin patriarch of Jerusalem, Daimbert of Pisa, and chose Evremar as his successor. Baldwin was last recorded in early 1108, witnessing a royal grant by King Baldwin I to the abbey at Jehoshaphat. He likely died soon after, as the archiepiscopal seat was vacant later that spring. He was succeeded by Evremar, who had in turn been deposed from the patriarchate.

== Bibliography ==
- Hamilton, Bernard (1980). The Latin Church in the Crusader States: The Secular Church. Variorum Publications. ISBN 978-1-351-88705-2.
- Hamilton, Bernard; Jotischky, Andrew (2020). Derek Baker (ed.). Latin and Greek Monasticism in the Crusader States. Cambridge University Press. ISBN 978-0521836388.
- Hazard, Harry W. (1975). "Caesarea and the Crusades". Bulletin of the American Schools of Oriental Research. Supplementary Studies (19). The American Schools of Oriental Research: 79–114. ISSN 0145-3661. JSTOR 20066618.
