= Gelasius of Caesarea =

Greek bishop and church historian (died 395)

Gelasius of Caesarea (Greek: Γελάσιος Καισαρείας; died 395) was bishop of Caesarea Maritima from 367 to 373 and from 379 to his death. He was also an author, though none of his work survives.

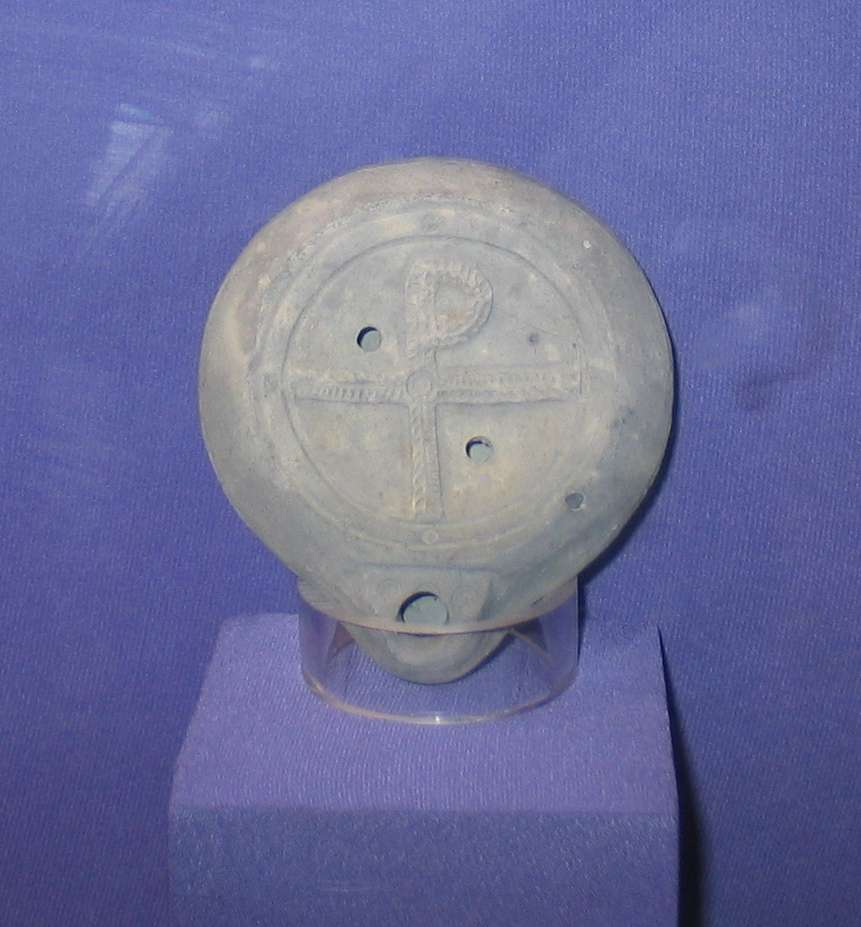
Lamp with staurogram from 4th-century Caesarea Maritima.

Gelasius participated in the First Council of Constantinople in 381. He was forced to surrender his position as bishop to the semi-Arianist Euzoius of Caesarea between the years of 373 and 379, because in matters of Christology he was a staunch Nicaean.

According to Jerome, his writing was careful and polished, though he never published what he wrote. However, in the fifth century Socrates Scholasticus cites some of his works, and it seems that he wrote a sequence to Eusebius' Church History, preserved in the first fifteen chapters of Rufinus' tenth book added to Eusebius' history, which includes the legend of Helena's discovery of the True Cross.

Gelasius was nephew to Cyril of Jerusalem, the most vigorous advocate for Jerusalem in the later fourth century, and at whose deathbed request Gelasius wrote his history.

He is also the first to mention the rôle of Helena, the mother of Constantine the Great, in the finding (inventio) of the Holy Wood, the Cross of Christ in Jerusalem under the Temple of Venus on the hill known as Golgotha.

Titles of the Great Christian Church
Preceded by Acacius of Caesarea	Bishop of Caesarea; 367–373, 379–395	Succeeded by Euzoius of Caesarea
