= Basilios Blatsos =

Greek Orthodox bishop

Basilios Blatsos (1923 – October 3, 2012) was the Greek Orthodox bishop of Caesarea, Israel.
