= Miles of Plancy =

Commander in the Kingdom of Jerusalem (died 1174)

Miles of Plancy (French: Milon, Latin: Milo; died October 1174) was a French-born nobleman who rose to high offices in the Kingdom of Jerusalem. He arrived in the kingdom during the reign of his kinsman King Amalric, who appointed him seneschal in 1168. Miles accompanied the king on two campaigns in Egypt. In early 1174 the king arranged for Miles to marry a great heiress, Stephanie of Milly, which made Miles lord of Transjordan, one of the largest fiefs in the kingdom. Amalric died on 11 July 1174 and was succeeded by his minor son, Baldwin IV. A regent was not immediately appointed to rule in the boy king's name, and so Miles duly assumed the government in his capacity as seneschal. He was of a too imperious temperament to cooperate with other noblemen, however, and soon caused resentment that led to his murder.

== Royal kinsman and adviser ==
Miles hailed from Plancy-l'Abbaye in the Champagne region of France, and was a relative of the royal family of Jerusalem. The historian Jean Richard asserts that Miles was related to the Montlhérys, who were the maternal kin of King Baldwin II (r. 1118–1131). Richard's colleague Bernard Hamilton thus describes Miles as the third cousin of King Amalric, who was a grandson of Baldwin.

Miles came to the Kingdom of Jerusalem in the 1160s. He is first mentioned in King Amalric's confirmation of a grant by the nobleman Philip of Milly to the Order of the Knights Templar in January 1166. Philip resigned the lordship of Transjordan to his elder daughter, Helena, and joined the Templars. Helena's husband, Walter III Brisebarre, was forced by King Amalric to surrender his ancestral lordship, Beirut. Hamilton proposes that the king wished to prevent the union of two great fiefs.

== Seneschal ==
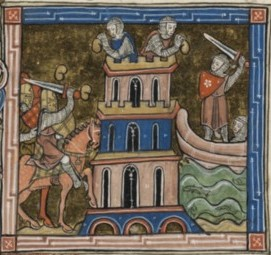
Miles took part in the attacks on Egypt in 1167 and 1168.

Miles became a trusted adviser of King Amalric. His influence was particularly evident in Amalric's campaigns in Egypt. Miles first accompanied the king to Egypt in 1167. In the opening phase of this campaign Miles led men in a secondary action in the surroundings of Cairo. Amalric had appointed him to the office of seneschal by May 1168. As seneschal, Miles was in charge of the royal finances and castles. He was also entitled to preside, in the absence of the king, over the meetings of the High Court, a judicial body that chiefly conveyanced property but also adjudicated in cases involving the king's vassals, debated policy, and enacted laws.

Miles took part in the 1168 campaign in Egypt as well. The royal army took and plundered Bilbais and massacred its inhabitants before moving on to besiege Cairo. William of Tyre, who chronicled the events, writes that Cairo could have been taken by storm, but Miles advised the king to exact a tribute from the defenders instead. The reasoning was that a city taken by storm is open to plunder by the army, while tribute belongs solely to the king. The Egyptian vizier, Shawar, agreed to pay the tribute, but asked for time to collect it; he actually used the time to fortify the city, and its inhabitants grew resolute to resist when they heard of the massacre at Bilbais. Shawar also requested help from the Damascene ruler Nur ad-Din Zengi. Nur ad-Din sent an army led by his general Shirkuh, and Amalric retreated on 2 January 1169. William insists that it was the avarice of the king, encouraged by Miles, that doomed the attempt to capture Cairo. Instead, Egypt fell to Shirkuh, who was soon succeeded by his nephew Saladin. The campaign left the Order of the Knights Hospitaller financially exhausted.

In December 1170 Saladin appeared with a vast army at Darum, the kingdom's southernmost settlement. The king assembled an army to confront him, but they were shocked when they saw the size of Saladin's force and could not prevent him from breaking into Gaza, about 9 miles (14 km) to the north of Darum. Gaza's citadel was defended by Miles, who refused to allow the inhabitants of the city to take shelter in it; many were killed or captured by Saladin's army. No major battle took place, and Saladin returned to Egypt.

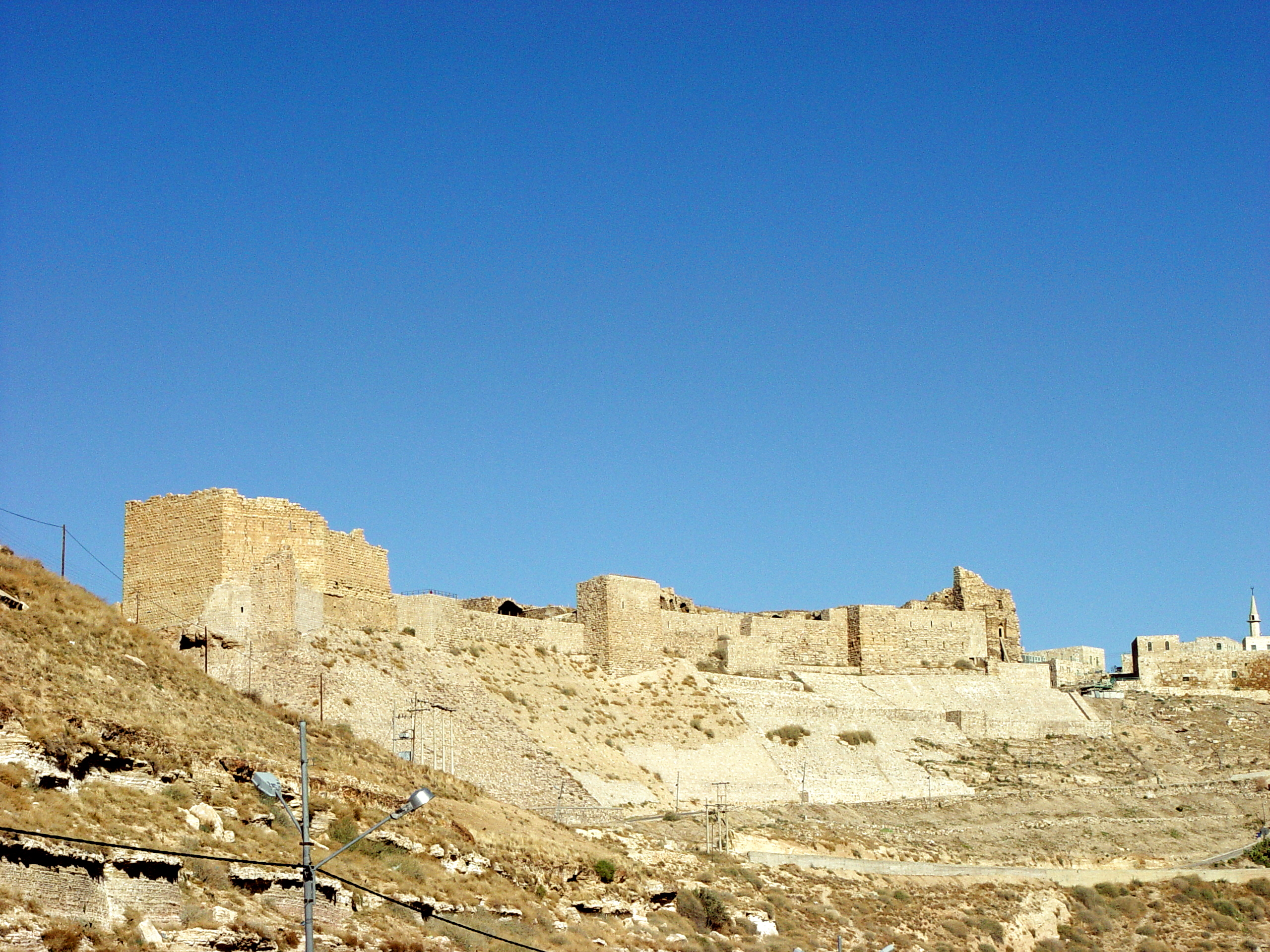
Kerak Castle was the seat of the lord of Transjordan.

After the death of Helena of Milly, Transjordan passed to Beatrice, her minor daughter by Walter III Brisebarre. Walter ruled Transjordan in Beatrice's name until Beatrice died, when the fief passed to her aunt, Stephanie of Milly. In early 1174 the king allowed Miles to marry Stephanie, who was by then the widow of Humphrey III of Toron. The wedding was probably held between 24 March and 18 April, when Miles assumed the title of lord. The marriage made Miles one of the most powerful men in the kingdom.

== Leadership ==
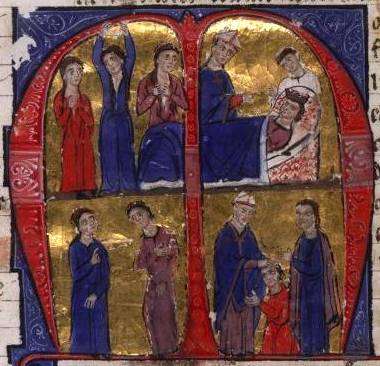
Amalric's sole son, Baldwin IV, was crowned after Amalric's death despite concerns about his health.

King Amalric died on 11 July 1174. The succession was deliberated for a few days, and the High Court convened to elect the new king. Hamilton presumes that Miles, as seneschal, presided over the meeting. Amalric's 13-year-old son, Baldwin IV, was elected unanimously according to William of Tyre, despite being suspected of having leprosy. Because he was a minor, a regent was needed to rule in his name. According to law, which Hamilton presumes to have been set at this time, the regency belonged to the minor king's nearest male relative on his father's side. The High Court apparently did not decide on this occasion who this was in the case of Baldwin IV, and so the government devolved on Miles in his capacity as seneschal.

Having acquired the lordship of Transjordan and the complete control of the kingdom's civil government, Miles wielded significant power and attempted to rule autocratically by excluding other noblemen from the government. William narrates that Miles wished to "lessen the envy of his fellows" and so formally obeyed the castellan of Jerusalem, Rohard of Jaffa, while reserving all power to himself. In the interpretation of the historian Jonathan Riley-Smith, Miles arranged for Rohard to be given the title of regent. Hamilton believes that Miles instead appointed Rohard to be the personal guardian of the young king, "a title which", in the words of William of Tyre, "sounded good but conferred no power".

King Amalric had agreed to launch a joint attack on Egypt with King William II of Sicily. The Sicilians were unaware of Amalric's death when they set sail. Miles prepared by renewing peace with Damascus. A large Sicilian force laid siege to Alexandria on 28 July. Miles had no say in military matters, however; they were in the hands of the constable, Humphrey II of Toron. Such a major military operation also required the support of the Hospitallers and the Templars. The Hospitallers had still not financially recovered from Amalric's previous attempt, and Hamilton argues that the master of the Temple, Odo of Saint-Amand, was too similar in character to the haughty seneschal to cooperate well with him. The constable therefore made no attempt to muster an army to join the Sicilians, who left the siege after five days.

Shortly after the failed siege, Count Raymond III of Tripoli came before the High Court to claim the regency. He said that he was King Baldwin IV's closest kinsman and the most powerful vassal, and that he himself had appointed King Amalric as his regent during his decade-long imprisonment. Lords Humphrey II of Toron, Reginald of Sidon, Baldwin II of Ramla, and Balian of Ibelin supported Raymond's claim; according to William of Tyre, so did all the bishops and almost all the people. Miles ruled that Raymond's request would be considered when the High Court convened in full, but sent Balian of Jaffa, brother of the castellan, Rohard, on a secret mission to northern Europe with gifts and letters. The seneschal's enemies began spreading rumors that he was going to seize the throne with the assistance of his friends and family in France. Hamilton suggests that Miles may have hoped to secure the appointment to the regency of one of the closer royal kinsmen who lived in Europe; while Raymond was King Amalric's first cousin, King Amalric's half-nephews King Henry II of England, Count Philip I of Flanders, and Bishop-elect Peter of Cambrai had a better claim to the regency. One of these might have then empowered Miles to rule on his behalf.

Hostility towards Miles built up, and a plot against his life was hatched. He was warned, but refused to take precaution. He was subsequently stabbed to death on an October evening in a street in Acre. William does not name the killers; Hamilton explains that William could not have done so even if he knew who they were because he would have faced legal repercussions if he failed to prove his allegations. According to the Annales of Caffaro, written in Genoa c. 1200, the assassins were the "lords of Beirut". Hamilton presumes that this refers to Walter Brisebarre and his brother Guy, and that they resented Miles because he did not restore Beirut to them after Amalric's death. According to Hamilton, William implies that the killers may have been incited by some of the more powerful enemies of the seneschal. The widowed lady of Transjordan, Stephanie, considered Raymond responsible. Miles's death caused a power vacuum in the kingdom, and the young king had to preside over council meetings until finally Raymond was accepted as regent. Nobody was tried for the murder.

== Assessment ==
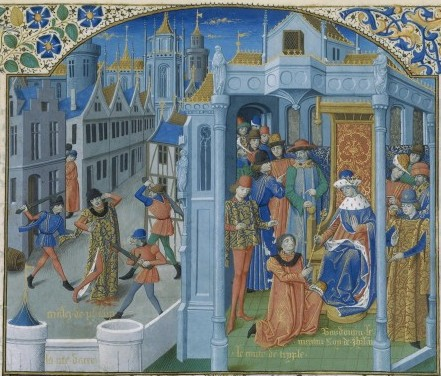
The assassination of Miles of Plancy was depicted in a 15th-century French edition of the chronicle of William of Tyre.

The chief source of information about Miles is Archbishop William of Tyre, a supporter of Raymond of Tripoli. William disliked Miles, finding him "totally lacking in caution" as well as "proud and arrogant", "of degenerate morals, one who neither feared God nor reverenced man", "a man without shame, a brawler and a slanderer, ever active in stirring up trouble". According to William, Miles "talked a great deal to little purpose and had far too good an opinion of himself". This prevented him from cooperating with the other lords and the military orders, and the tensions between them were detrimental to the kingdom. Hamilton believes that Miles nevertheless had to have been an able administrator given that the High Court left him in charge of the government. The historian Malcolm Barber notes that William was not impartial because he was involved in politics.

William writes that some contemporaries said that Miles was killed because of his loyalty to the king, which Hamilton considers a "just assessment": instead of buying the support of the Brisebarres, Miles guarded the royal domain, which Hamilton considers a proof of his integrity. Hamilton concludes that, because of his domineering temperament, Miles was unsuited to rule a state with a tradition of devolved power. Miles's failure to assist in the Sicilian attempt to overthrow Saladin is described by Hamilton as "a major error of judgement" because Saladin proved to be a serious threat to the kingdom.

== Sources ==
- Barber, Malcolm (2012). The Crusader States. Yale University Press. ISBN 978-0-3001-8931-5.
- Fulton, Michael S. (2024). Crusader Castle: The Desert Fortress of Kerak. Pen and Sword. ISBN 978-1-3990-9129-9.
- Hamilton, Bernard (1992). "Miles of Plancy and the fief of Beirut". The Horns of Ḥaṭṭīn. Proceedings of the Second Conference of the Society for the Study of the Crusades and the Latin East. Yad Izhak Ben-Zvi. ISBN 978-9-6521-7085-9.
- Hamilton, Bernard (2000). The Leper King and His Heirs: Baldwin IV and the Crusader Kingdom of Jerusalem. Cambridge University Press. ISBN 978-0-5210-1747-3.
- Lyons, Malcolm C.; Jackson, D.E.P. (1984). Saladin: The Politics of the Holy War. Oriental Publications, University of Cambridge. Cambridge University Press. ISBN 978-0-5213-1739-9.
- Mayer, Hans Eberhard (1990). Die Kreuzfahrerherrschaft Montréal (Šōbak): Jordanien im 12. Jahrhundert (in German). Otto Harrassowitz Verlag. ISBN 978-3-447-02988-9.
- Richard, Jean (1979). The Latin Kingdom of Jerusalem. Europe in the Middle Ages: selected studies. Vol. 11A. Translated by Janet Shirley. North-Holland Publishing Company. ISBN 978-0-4448-5092-8.
- Riley-Smith, J. (1973). The Feudal Nobility and the Kingdom of Jerusalem, 1174-1277. Macmillan. ISBN 978-0-2080-1348-4.
- Runciman, Steven (1952). A History of the Crusades. Vol. II: The Kingdom of Jerusalem. Cambridge University Press. ISBN 0-5213-4771-8.

Political offices
Preceded by Guy of Milly	Seneschal of Jerusalem; 1168–1174	Vacant Title next held by Joscelin of Courtenay
Titles of nobility
Preceded by Beatrice Brisebarre or Stephanie of Milly	Lord of Transjordan; 1174 with Stephanie of Milly	Succeeded by Stephanie of Milly as sole ruler
