= Brisebarre =

Brisebarre is a French surname. It may refer to:

- Brisebarre family
  - Walter I Brisebarre (died c. 1135), lord of Beirut
  - Guy I Brisebarre (died after 1148), lord of Beirut
  - Beatrice Brisebarre (fl. 1167), lady of Transjordan
  - Walter III Brisebarre (died after 1174), lord of Beirut, Transjordan and Blanchegarde
  - Guy Brisebarre the Younger (died before 1192)
  - Gilles Brisebarre (died before 1220), lord of Blanchegarde
  - Walter III of Caesarea (died 1229)
  - John of Caesarea (died c. 1240)
  - Margaret of Caesarea (died after 1255)
  - Raoul Brisebarre (died after 1265), lord of Blanchegarde
- Jean Brisebarre (fl. 1305–1327), French poet
- Édouard Brisebarre (1815–1871), French playwright
- Anne-Marie Brisebarre (fl. 1978–2013), French ethnologist
