= Humphrey III of Toron =

12th century Frankish noble in Jerusalem

Humphrey III of Toron (fl. 1148–1170) was a Frankish nobleman in the Kingdom of Jerusalem.

Humphrey III was the son of the constable of Jerusalem and lord of Toron, Humphrey II. Humphrey III's mother was the daughter and heir of the lord of Banias, Renier Brus. In 1148 the young Humphrey and his mother confirmed the gift of Humphrey II to the Order of Saint Lazarus, and in 1161 he witnessed the agreement by which King Baldwin III granted the lordship of Transjordan to Philip of Milly in exchange for Philip's lands in Nablus. Humphrey married Philip's younger daughter, Stephanie of Milly, and had two children with her: a son, Humphrey IV of Toron, who was the heir apparent to his parents, and a daughter, Isabella.

Philip of Milly resigned his lands to enter the Order of the Knights Templar, and the lordship of Transjordan passed to his elder daughter, Helena, and Helena's husband, Walter III Brisebarre, in 1166. Helena died before November 1167, and Walter henceforth ruled Transjordan in the name of their minor daughter, Beatrice. Beatrice died between November 1167 and February 1174, which led to Stephanie inheriting the fief. Beatrice may have predeceased Humphrey, which would mean that Humphrey was briefly lord of Transjordan, but he is never recorded as such. Humphrey is last found in charters in August 1168, when he was styled merely as the son of the constable, meaning that he had probably not become lord of Transjordan by this point.

In early 1170 Transjordan was invaded by the Damascene ruler Nur ad-Din, who laid siege to the Kerak Castle. Humphrey the constable planned the Frankish response. As reported by the Arab chronicler Ibn al-Athir, Humphrey and his father-in-law, who had risen to become master of the Templars, led the vanguard. The approach of their army forced Nur ad-Din to give up the siege. Transjordan was further invaded by the Egyptian ruler Saladin in 1171 and 1173; he retreated both times. It is not known who ruled the lordship of Transjordan at this time.

Humphrey predeceased his father and was thus never lord of Toron. The exact date of his death is unknown. Because his death is not noted in contemporary sources, he may have been ill for a long time. Archbishop William of Tyre suggests in his chronicle that King Amalric arranged for Humphrey's widow to marry Miles of Plancy shortly after Humphrey's death. Miles is first mentioned as lord of Transjordan in April 1174.

== Bibliography ==
- Fulton, Michael S. (2024). Crusader Castle: The Desert Fortress of Kerak. Pen and Sword. ISBN 978-1-3990-9129-9.
- Tibble, Steven (1989). Monarchy and Lordships in the Latin Kingdom of Jerusalem, 1099-1291. Clarendon Press. ISBN 978-0-19-822731-1.
- Runciman, Steven (1952). A History of the Crusades. Vol. II: The Kingdom of Jerusalem. Cambridge University Press. ISBN 0521347718.
