= Maurice of Montreal =

Maurice of Montreal was Lord of Oultrejordain from around 1149. He succeeded his uncle, Pagan the Butler, and continued the construction of Kerak Castle. He granted fiefs to the Knights Hospitaller in his domains. He participated in the siege of Ascalon in 1153.

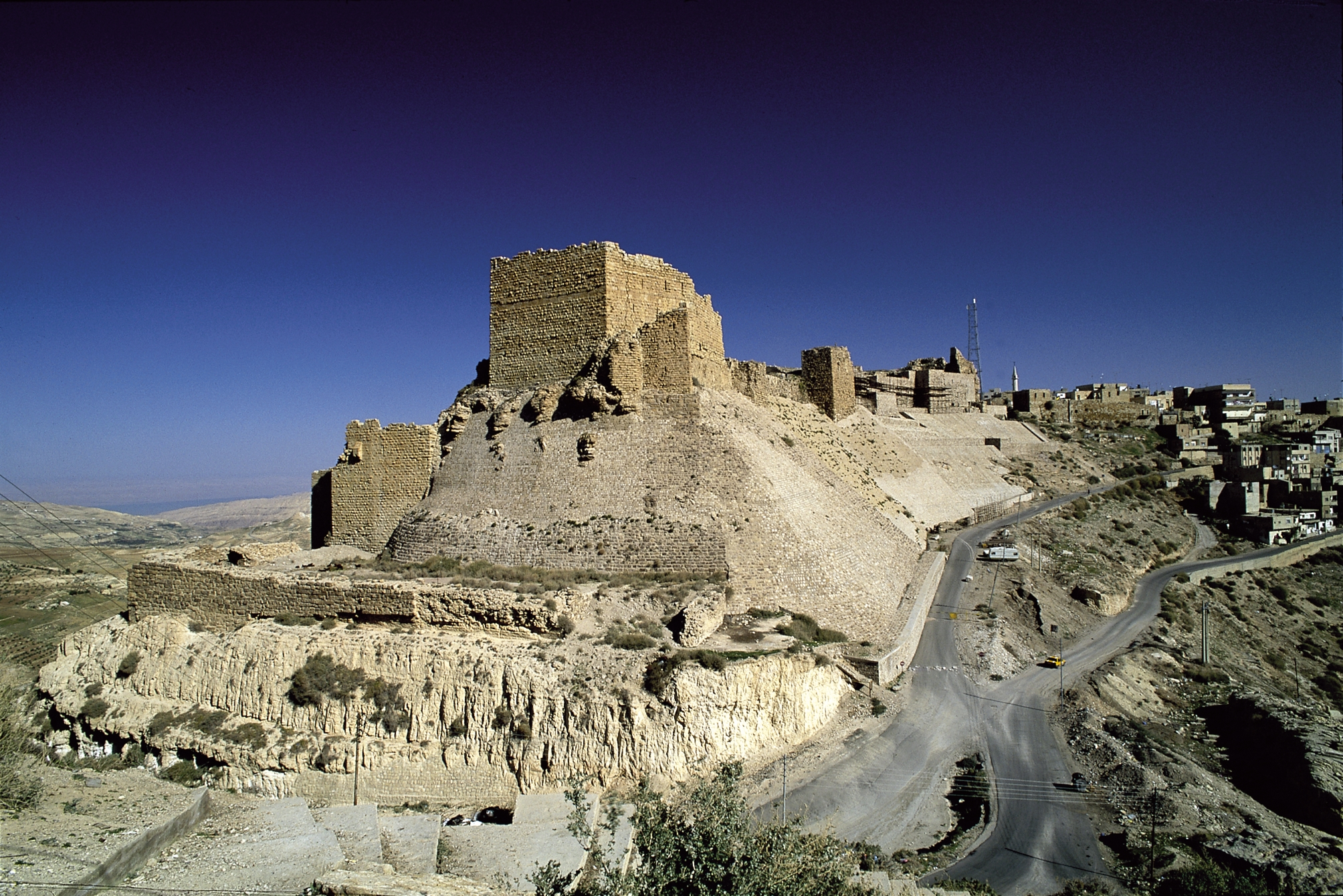
Kerak Castle (at present-day Al-Karak in Jordan)

Historian Malcolm Barber describes Maurice as "a shadowy figure in the history" of the Kingdom of Jerusalem. He inherited the lordship of Oultrejordain from his uncle, Pagan the Butler, who died in the late 1140s. He continued the construction of Kerak Castle. According to the only royal charter that mentioned him, Maurice granted the lower Ward of Kerak and a house at Montreal Castle to the Knights Hospitaller in 1152. On this occasion, he also gave them two villages in fief and secured their right to freely use boats at the Dead Sea. William of Tyre listed him among the barons of the realm who assisted King Baldwin III during the siege of Ascalon in 1153. Steven Runciman writes that the wife of Philip of Milly was Pagan the Butler's niece, but her name, Isabelle, is the only known fact about her. Philip of Milly received Oultrejordain from King Baldwin III in exchange for his former estates in 1161.

== Sources ==
- Barber, Malcolm (1994). The New Knighthood: A History of the Order of the Temple. Cambridge University Press. ISBN 978-1-107-60473-5.
- Barber, Malcolm (2003). "The career of Philip of Nablus in the kingdom of Jerusalem". In Edbury, Peter; Phillips, Jonathan (eds.). The Experience of Crusading, Volume 2. Cambridge University Press. pp. 60–74. ISBN 0-521-78151-5.
- Milwright, Marcus (2008). The Fortress of the Raven: Karak in the Middle Islamic Period (1100–1650). BRILL. ISBN 978-90-04-16519-9.
- Runciman, Steven (1989). A History of the Crusades, Volume II: The Kingdom of Jerusalem and the Frankish East, 1100-1187. Cambridge University Press. ISBN 0-521-06163-6.

Maurice of Montreal Died: after 1153
Preceded by Pagan the Butler	Lord of Oultrejordain c. 1149–after 1153	Vacant Royal domain Title next held by Philip of Milly
