= Walter III =

Walter III may refer to:

- Walter III Brisebarre of Beirut
- Walter III of Brienne
- Walter III of Caesarea
- Walter III of Châtillon
- Walter III de Clifford
