= Siege of Tyre (1187) =

By the Ayyubids under Saladin

- Part of the Crusades
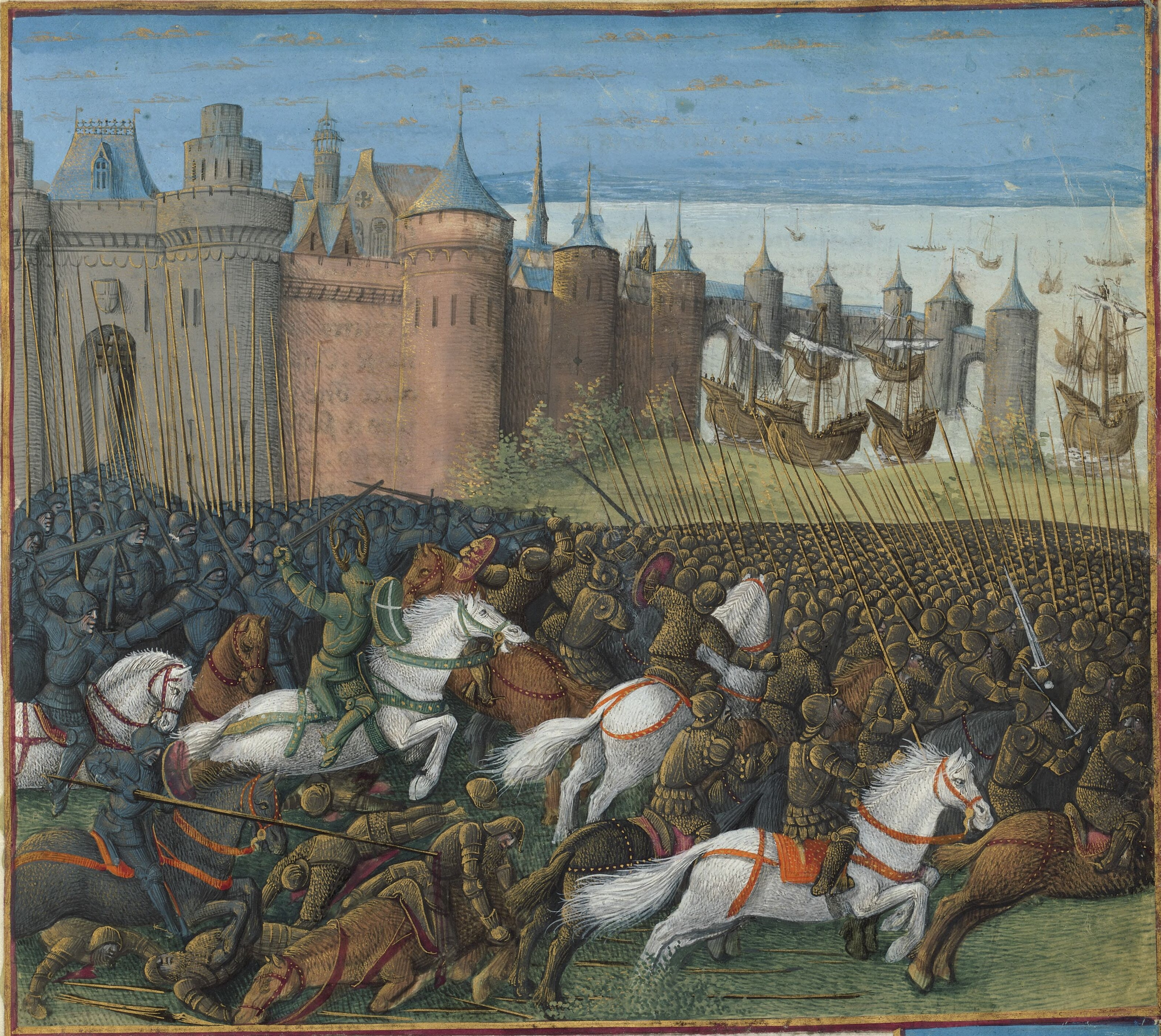
- 15th-century miniature depicting a charge of the Christian defenders against Saladin's army. Part of the manuscript Les Passages d’Outremer, by Sébastien Mamerot.
| Date | 12 November 1187 – 1 January 1188 |
| Location | Tyre 33°16′00″N 35°12′00″E |
| Result | Crusader victory |

Belligerents
| Kingdom of Jerusalem: Lordship of Sidon; Knights Templar | Ayyubids |

Commanders and leaders
| Conrad of Montferrat; Sancho Martin | Saladin; Abd al-Salam al-Maghribi; Abd al-Mohsen; Al-Faris Bedran |

Strength
| 40,000+ soldiers 17 galleys | 20,000–25,000 soldiers 10 galleys |

Casualties and losses
| Light | Heavy |
- Location within Lebanon

The siege of Tyre took place from 12 November 1187 to 1 January 1188. An Ayyubid army commanded by Saladin made an amphibious assault on the city, defended by Conrad of Montferrat. After two months of continuous struggle, Saladin dismissed his army and retreated to Acre.

== Background ==
After the disastrous Battle of Hattin, much of the Holy Land had been lost to Saladin, including Jerusalem. The remnants of the crusader army flocked to Tyre, which was one of the major cities still in Christian hands. Reginald of Sidon was in charge of Tyre and was in the process of negotiating its surrender with Saladin, but the arrival of Conrad and his soldiers prevented it. Reginald left the city to refortify his castle at Belfort, and Conrad became the leader of the army. He immediately began to repair the defenses of the city, and he cut a deep trench across the mole that joined the city to the shore, to prevent the enemy from approaching the city. The Muslim army arrived on November 12, and started the siege. The rest of the army arrived 13 days later.

== The siege ==
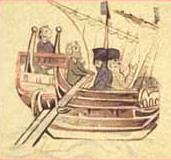
Conrad arrives at Tyre: marginal sketch in late a 12th-century copy of the Brevis Historia Regni Hierosolymitani, a continuation of the Annals of Genoa (Bib. Nat. Française)

The fight was hard. Saladin's army had seventeen siege engines that constantly attacked the city's walls, while the ships of the crusaders, filled with archers, crossbowmen and stone-throwing engines, harassed the attacking army.

All of Saladin's attacks failed, and the siege dragged on, with occasional sallies by the defenders, led by a Spanish knight named Sancho Martin, better known as the "green knight" due to the colour of his arms. His bravery and skill were said to cause admiration in both the Christian and Muslim armies, and particularly in Saladin. It was said that Saladin offered him many riches if he would convert to Islam and fight in his army. Nevertheless, he refused and kept leading the Christian attacks against the Muslim army.

It became clear to Saladin that only by winning at sea could he take the city. He summoned a fleet of 10 galleys commanded by a North African sailor named Abd al-Salam al-Maghribi. The Muslim fleet had initial success in forcing the Christian galleys into the harbour, but through the night of 29–30 December, a Christian fleet of 17 galleys attacked 5 of the Muslim galleys, inflicting a decisive defeat and capturing them. Muslim chroniclers claim that Al-Faris Bedran's mistakes led to the defeat. The remaining galleys were ordered to retire, given their low numbers. After this naval setback, Saladin's forces made a final attempt to take the city, but they were defeated again, suffering heavy losses.

After these events, Saladin summoned his emirs for a conference, to discuss if they should retire or keep trying. The opinions were divided, but Saladin, seeing the state of his troops, decided to retire to Acre. The siege ended on January 1, 1188.

== Aftermath ==
After the victory, Conrad's prestige received a huge boost. For Saladin, it constituted a turning point in his career. It proved the incapacity of his army to sustain long sieges. For the crusaders, it was a very important victory because Tyre became a rallying-point for the future Christian revival during the Third Crusade. Had Tyre not held out, it is likely that the Third Crusade would have been much less successful.
