= Stephanie of Milly =

12th-century lady of Transjordan

Stephanie of Milly (Old French: Estiennette, Estefenie, French: Étiennette) was the lady of Transjordan and one of the greatest heiresses in the 12th-century Kingdom of Jerusalem. She inherited her vast lordship—centered on the fortresses of Montreal and Kerak—after the resignation of her father, Philip, and the deaths of her sister, Helena, and niece, Beatrice, between 1167 and 1174.

After the death of her first husband, Humphrey III of Toron, King Amalric arranged for her to marry Miles of Plancy, but Miles was assassinated soon after the king's death in 1174. She then ruled Transjordan alone until 1176 or 1177, when King Baldwin IV gave her hand in marriage to Raynald of Châtillon. During this time Transjordan became a major obstacle to the territorial expansion of Egypt's ruler, Saladin. When Saladin besieged Kerak during the wedding of Stephanie's son, Humphrey IV of Toron, and the king's half-sister, Isabella, Stephanie reportedly negotiated that the newlyweds' tower be spared from bombardment. She again bargained with Saladin in 1187 after he conquered nearly the entire kingdom and captured her son in battle, agreeing to exchange Kerak and Montreal for her son's freedom. She died in or slightly before 1190.

== Early life ==
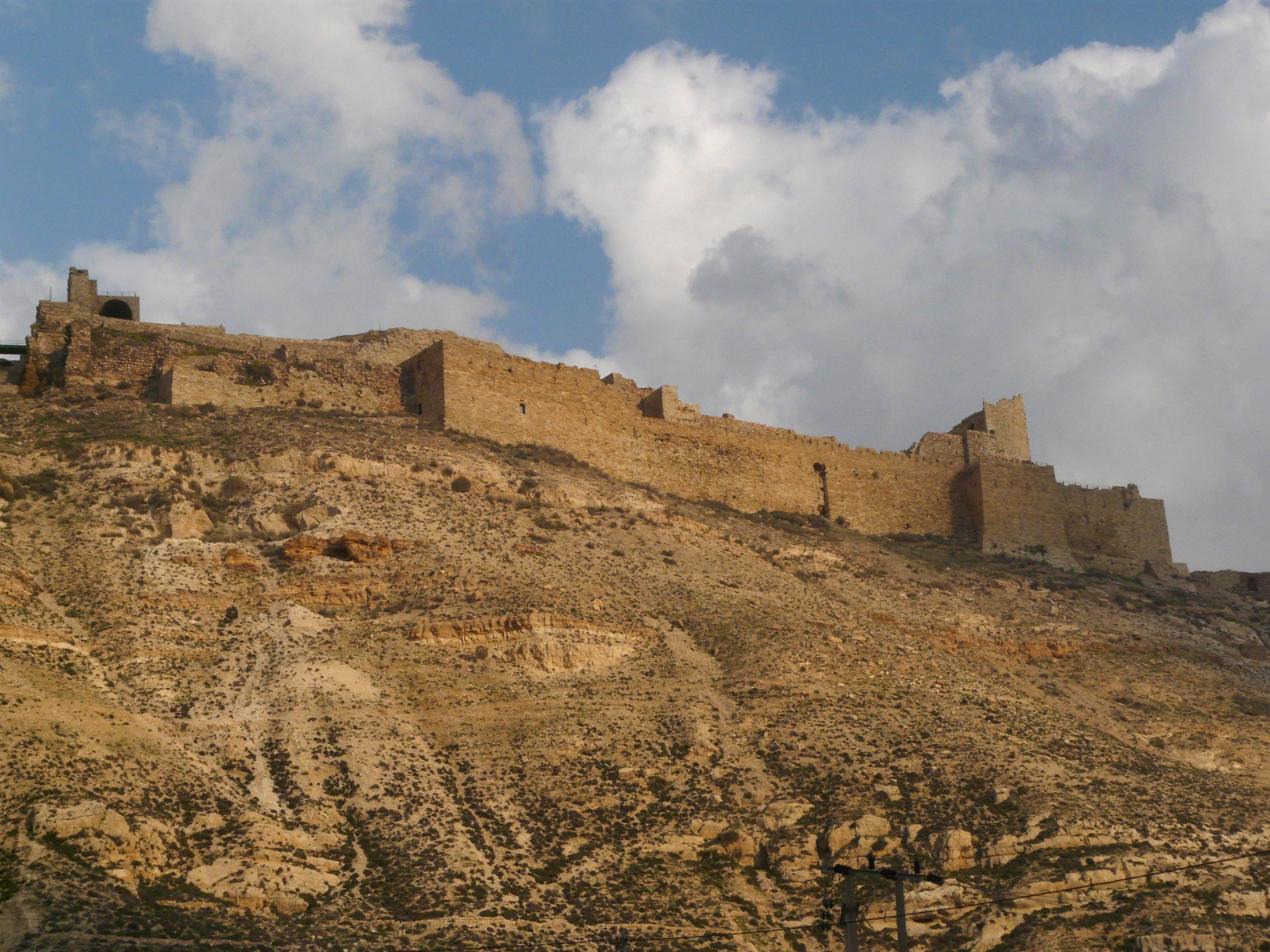
Kerak Castle was one of the principal strongholds of the Milly family.

Stephanie was one of the three children of Philip of Milly and his wife, Isabella. She and her sister, Helena, and brother, Rainier, were born before 1153. She was named after her Flemish paternal grandmother. Philip was a powerful baron in the Kingdom of Jerusalem, holding vast lands in the area of Nablus. In 1161, he exchanged these lands for the Lordship of Transjordan, which was centered on the strongholds of Montreal and Kerak.

Stephanie's first husband was Humphrey III of Toron, son and heir apparent of Humphrey II, lord of Toron and constable of the kingdom. She may have already been married to him in 1161; he was one of the witnesses of her father's land exchange. Other witnesses included Walter II Brisebarre, lord of Beirut, who married Helena. In 1166, Philip entered the Order of the Temple; Rainier had apparently died by then and Transjordan passed to Helena, with Walter ruling it on her behalf. Helena died before 18 November 1167, leaving Walter to rule Transjordan on behalf of their daughter, Beatrice. Stephanie's father rose to become grand master of the Templars and died in 1171.

== Lady of Transjordan ==
=== Second marriage ===
By February 1174, Stephanie's niece had died as well, and the lordship of Transjordan devolved on Stephanie. Whether or not Beatrice predeceased Humphrey III—with whom Stephanie had two children, Humphrey IV and Isabella—is not clear. In early 1174, King Amalric arranged for Stephanie to marry his seneschal and favorite, Miles of Plancy. Archbishop William of Tyre, chancellor and chronicler of the kingdom, suggests that this marriage took place shortly after Humphrey III's death, but a year of mourning had to have been observed. The wedding was probably held between 24 March and 18 April, when Miles assumed the title of lord. Their marriage appears to have produced no children.

After the death of King Amalric in July 1174, Miles assumed government of the kingdom in the name of the minor King Baldwin IV. A dispute with Count Raymond III of Tripoli, who demanded regency as Baldwin and Amalric's closest male relative, ended with Miles's assassination in Acre in October. Stephanie believed Raymond to be behind the murder, but a later source lays the blame on her dispossessed brother-in-law Walter.

=== Authority ===
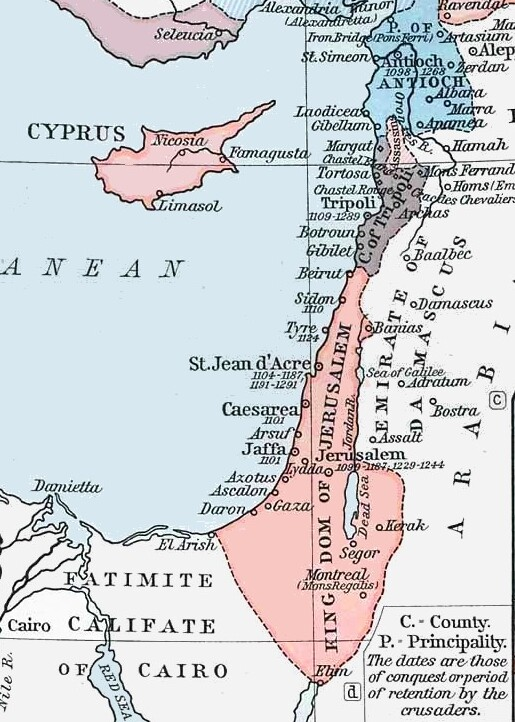
Stephanie held a vast, strategically important lordship centered on Montreal and Kerak on the eastern border of the Kingdom of Jerusalem.

At the time Stephanie lost another husband—and Transjordan its lord—the Egyptian ruler Saladin took control of Damascus and quickly proceeded to establish his rule over most of northern Syria. Because of the strategic value of Transjordan, which formed an obstacle to the movement of troops and goods between Cairo and Damascus, Stephanie was the most important heiress in the kingdom. The king, or his regent, had the prerogative to force a feudal heiress to marry, but Stephanie remained a widow well after the year of mourning to which she was entitled had concluded. She could rely on the support of her father-in-law, Humphrey II of Toron, and the Templars, whom her father had once led, and Raymond—now regent—could not afford to pressure her. It may have been in this period that Stephanie granted a small garden to the Order of the Hospital, a donation which she made alone.

In early 1176, the widowed nobleman Raynald of Châtillon returned to the kingdom from a successful mission to the Byzantine imperial court at Constantinople. He had ruled the Principality of Antioch as the second husband of Princess Constance, but when she died, Antioch passed to his stepson Prince Bohemond III. King Baldwin, who came of age in 1176, agreed that Raynald should marry Stephanie. Their union was celebrated between late 1176 and June 1177. They may have had two children: a daughter named Alice and a son, Raynald, who died young; alternatively, these may have been the children from Raynald's previous marriage to Constance. Humphrey remained the heir apparent to Stephanie's lordship.

As lord of Transjordan, Raynald proved to be a significant threat to Saladin. Stephanie participated in Raynald's acts, but appears to have held a less prominent role in the government of her lands during Raynald's rule than Constance had had over hers. When the marriage of King Baldwin's sister and heir presumptive, Sibylla, with Guy of Lusignan sharply divided the nobility of the kingdom, Stephanie and Raynald stood with Guy; on the other side were, among others, Count Raymond and Queen Maria Komnene, Baldwin and Sibylla's stepmother.

=== Weddings and sieges ===
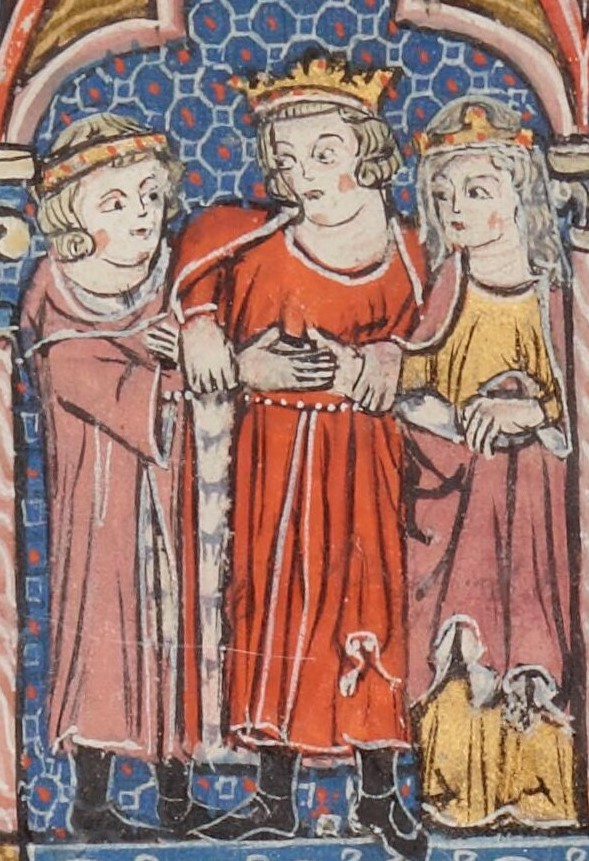
Stephanie hosted her son's wedding at Kerak when the castle was besieged.

In late 1180, Raynald arranged illustrious marriages for Stephanie's children. Isabella was married to the lord of Cilician Armenia, Roupen III, while Humphrey was engaged to marry another Isabella, daughter of King Amalric and half-sister of King Baldwin. With this marriage, Baldwin hoped to remove his half-sister from the reach of potential conspirators who might seek to enthrone her in place of Baldwin's elder sister, Sibylla, and Sibylla's unpopular husband, Guy of Lusignan. The eight-year-old Isabella was thus sent to live at Kerak with Stephanie.

In October 1183, Isabella reached the marriageable age of 12. Saladin laid a siege to Kerak during the wedding festivities, hoping to capture valuable prisoners. The most detailed account of the siege comes from Ernoul, who was probably informed by the bride's mother, Queen Maria. He narrates that Stephanie brought down dishes from the wedding feast to Saladin and reminded him that he had once held her in his arms when he was a prisoner at Kerak. Saladin then asked in which tower her son and daughter-in-law were staying so that he would not bombard it. (Note: The story of Saladin's imprisonment in Kerak between 1163 and 1169 and interaction with Stephanie does not match what is otherwise known about his life and career, and Stephanie was too old to have been held in the way Ernoul suggests.) The castle withstood weeks of intense bombardment until the arrival of King Baldwin in early December, when Saladin lifted the siege and retreated. Another siege followed in July 1184, but it was once again relieved within weeks by the king's army.

=== Divisions and fall ===
The kingdom was severely weakened by the rift among its nobles. Following Stephanie's advice, Humphrey prevented his wife from seeing her mother, which earned him the queen's hatred. Baldwin IV died in 1185; his nephew and successor, Baldwin V, died in 1186. Baldwin V's mother, Sibylla, swiftly moved to take the throne despite an earlier agreement that the succession would be decided between her and Isabella by a committee of European kings; she then made Guy king. Guy's opponents proposed installing Humphrey and Isabella as anti-king and queen, but Humphrey refused, possibly because he did not wish to bear arms against his mother and stepfather.

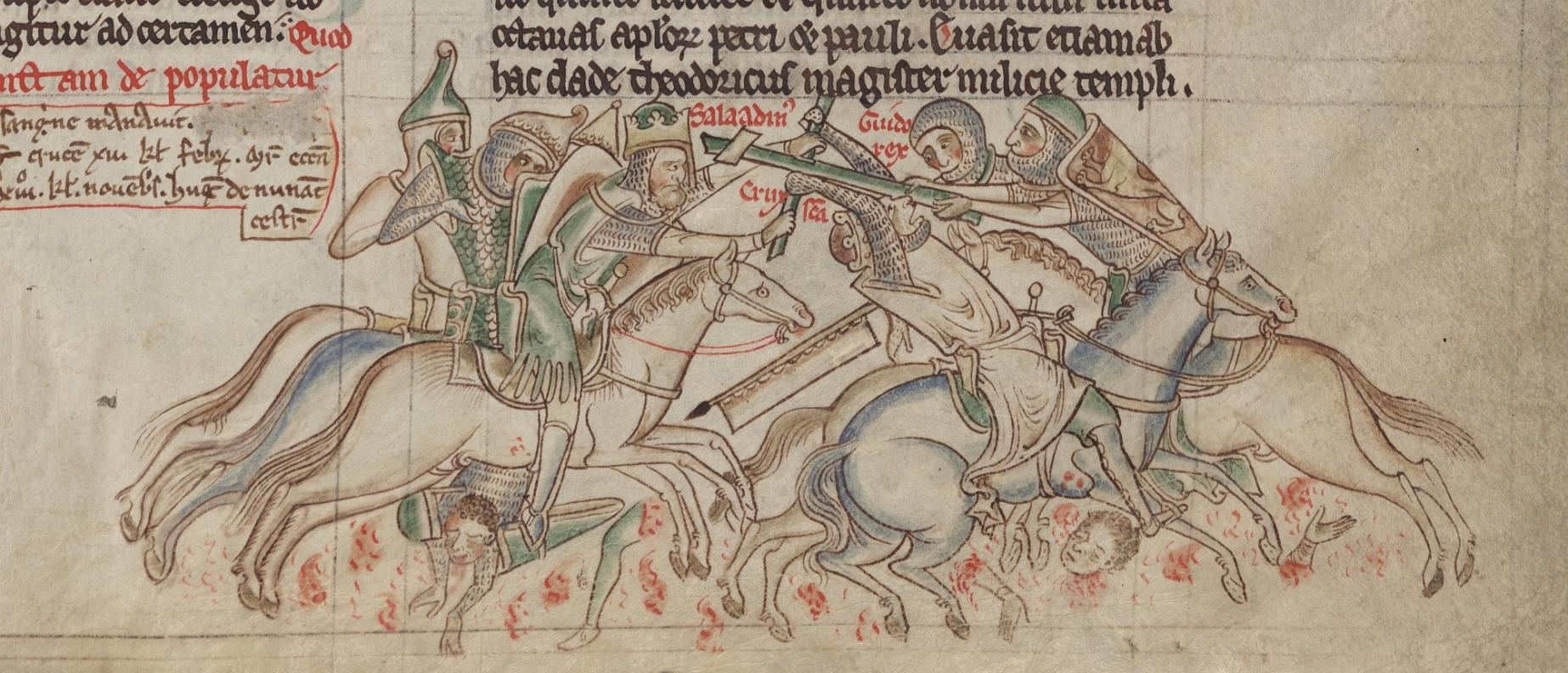
The Christian defeat at Hattin resulted in the capture of Stephanie's son, execution of her husband, and fall of the kingdom.

Saladin declared war in April 1187, once again attacking Kerak. On 4 July, King Guy and Stephanie's husband and son were captured at the Battle of Hattin; Raynald was summarily executed by Saladin. Raynald's death left Stephanie with full authority over Montreal and Kerak. She and her daughter-in-law took refuge in Jerusalem, but the city fell to Saladin in early October. Stephanie was allowed to go free and keep all her wealth and attendants. Saladin received her and Isabella along with Queen Sibylla, who came to plead for the release of her husband. Saladin's retainer Imad al-Din al-Isfahani, who describes Stephanie as "virtuous and intelligent", writes that she uncovered her otherwise veiled face and in tears agreed to surrender her castles in return for Humphrey's release. Humphrey was then brought from Damascus to be reunited with his wife and mother, who were also given luxurious gifts.

Stephanie went to conduct the surrender of Kerak and Montreal in the company of some of Saladin's amirs, but the garrisons defending the castles disobeyed her command to surrender and accused her of allying with Muslims. She returned terrified for Humphrey's fate, but Saladin assured her that he would be treated well. She then surrendered Humphrey back to Saladin and went to Tyre, the kingdom's sole remaining city. This honorable act impressed Saladin, and he released Humphrey after a few months. Kerak withstood Saladin's siege for more than 18 months, finally surrendering in November 1188; Montreal held out for a few more months. Stephanie appears to have died by mid-September 1190, when Humphrey was styled as lord of Montreal in a royal charter.

== Fiction ==
In the 1963 Egyptian film Saladin the Victorious, the character Virginia of Kerak (Laila Fawzi) serves as a composite substitute for Stephanie, Sibylla and Isabella.

== Bibliography ==
- Barber, Malcolm (2003). "The career of Philip of Nablus in the kingdom of Jerusalem". In Edbury, Peter; Phillips, Jonathan (eds.). The Experience of Crusading. Vol. 2. Cambridge University Press. pp. 60–78. ISBN 0-521-78151-5.
- Barber, Malcolm (2012). The Crusader States. Yale University Press. ISBN 978-0-3001-8931-5.
- Crawford, Paul F. (2017). "An Upstart without Prospects? The Familial Context of Renaud of Châtillon and its Implications". Cultural Encounters in Late Antiquity and the Middle Ages. Vol. 22. Turnhout, Belgium: Brepols Publishers. doi:10.1484/m.celama-eb.5.112977. ISBN 978-2-503-56718-1.
- Gourdon, Joël (2001). Le cygne et l'éléphant: Renaud de Châtillon, prince d'Antioche, seigneur d'Outre-Jourdain (in French). Editions Le Manuscrit. ISBN 978-2-7481-1155-2.
- Fulton, Michael S. (2024). Crusader Castle: The Desert Fortress of Kerak. Pen and Sword. ISBN 978-1-3990-9129-9.
- Hamilton, Bernard (2000). The Leper King and His Heirs: Baldwin IV and the Crusader Kingdom of Jerusalem. Cambridge University Press. ISBN 978-0-5210-1747-3.
- Mayer, Hans Eberhard (1990). Die Kreuzfahrerherrschaft Montréal (Šōbak): Jordanien im 12. Jahrhundert (in German). Otto Harrassowitz Verlag. ISBN 978-3-447-02988-9.
- Hodgson, Natasha R. (2007). Women, Crusading and the Holy Land in Historical Narrative. Boydell Press. ISBN 978-1-84383-332-1.
- Gilchrist, Marianne McLeod (2020). "The Evil Genius of the Third Crusade". The Making of Crusading Heroes and Villains. Routledge. doi:10.4324/9780429293283-4. ISBN 978-0-429-29328-3.
- Nicholson, Helen J. (2019). "The true gentleman? Correct behaviour towards women according to Christian and Muslim writers". Crusading and Masculinities. Routledge. doi:10.4324/9781315166490-7. ISBN 978-1-315-16649-0.
- Runciman, Steven (1989) [1952]. A History of the Crusades. Vol. II: The Kingdom of Jerusalem. Cambridge University Press. ISBN 0521347718.
