= Roman of Le Puy =

French nobleman

Roman of Le Puy, also known as Romanus of Puy (Latin: Romanus de Podio), was the first lord of Transjordan in the Kingdom of Jerusalem from around 1120 to around 1126. He was a nobleman from Auvergne who accompanied Adhemar de Monteil, Bishop of Le Puy, to the Holy Land during the First Crusade. He signed royal charters during the reign of King Baldwin I. Baldwin I or his successor, King Baldwin II, granted Roman the important fief of Transjordan, or its northern region. He was deprived of most of his domains because of a rebellion against Baldwin II. He and his son lost their remaining estates after they were accused of conspiring against Baldwin II's successor, King Fulk, in the early 1130s.

== Early life ==
Roman was mentioned as Romanus de Podio in written sources between around 1110 and 1133. Modern historians associate Podium with Le Puy-en-Velay in Auvergne. If this identification is correct, Roman was most probably a retainer of the bishop of Le Puy, Adhemar de Monteil. The bishop accompanied Count Raymond IV of Toulouse to the Holy Land during the First Crusade.

== Royal vassal ==
Roman was the first known castellan of Ramla in the Kingdom of Jerusalem, appointed before 1107, according to Jonathan Riley-Smith. Hans Eberhard Mayer refutes Riley-Smith's view, emphasizing that no primary source substantiates that Roman held the fortress. Roman signed more than five royal charters from the 1110s. For instance, he was the fourth lay witness of a charter that King Baldwin I issued for the hospital in Jerusalem on 20 June 1112; and he was the last among the witnesses on Baldwin I's charter for the Abbey of St. Mary of the Valley of Jehosaphat in 1114 or 1115.

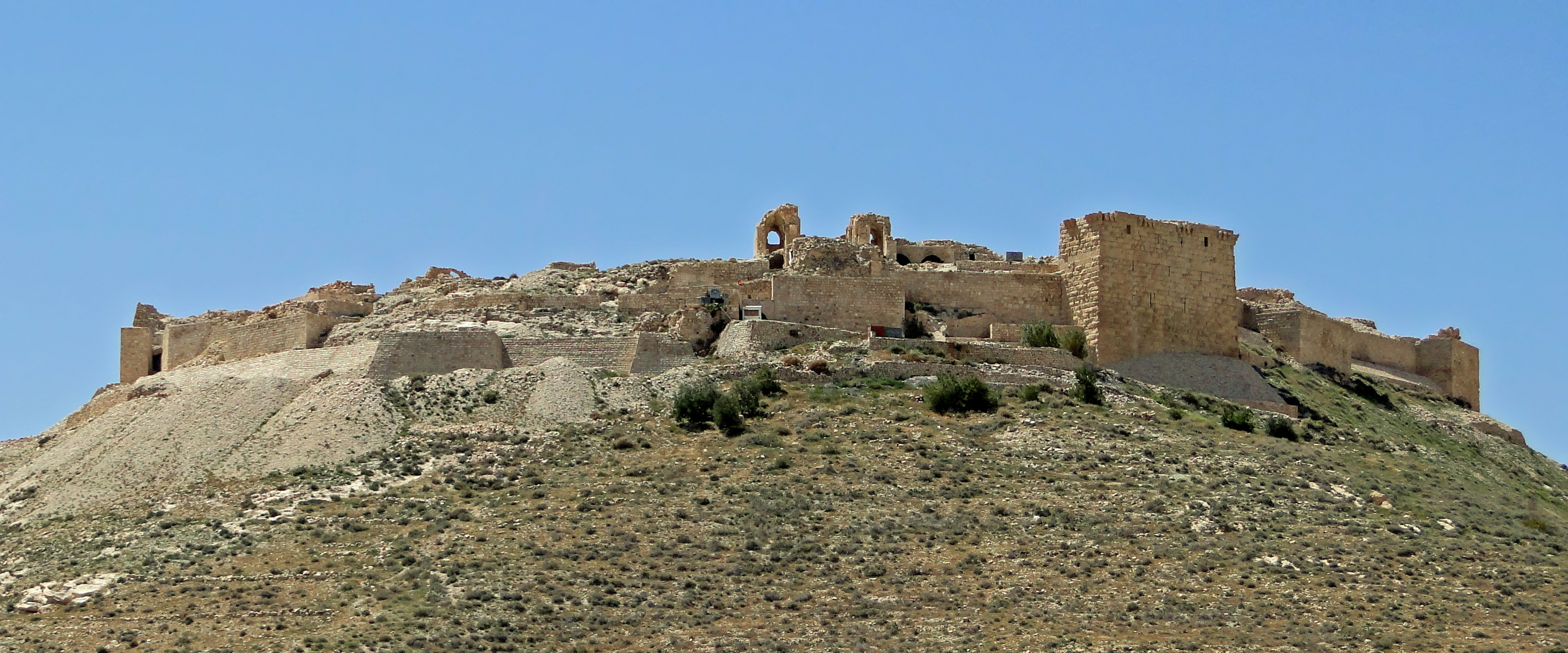
Krak de Montreal

William of Tyre states that Roman was the first lord of Transjordan. Either Baldwin I, or Baldwin I's successor, King Baldwin II, granted the territory to him in the late 1110s or early 1120s, according to most historians. Historian Steven Tibble proposes that Roman only held the territory to the north of Wadi Mujib, because the southern region of Transjordan remained part of the royal demesne. The seat of the lordship, Krak de Montreal, was built in a fertile valley to the east of the River Jordan at Baldwin I's order in 1115. Montreal and two smaller fortresses—li Vaux Moysi near Petra and Ailah on the Red Sea—strengthened the defence of the kingdom and secured the control of the caravan routes between Damascus and Egypt.

Baldwin II allegedly dispossessed Roman in or before 1126, because in that year Pagan the Butler was mentioned as lord of Transjordan. According to a widespread scholarly theory, the Etablissement du roi Baudoin de Borc—a document about the erection of ports and roads without royal permission—was issued to authorize the king to confiscate Transjordan after Roman's unsuccessful rebellion. Although Roman and his son, Ralph, were deprived of the wealthy lordship, Roman could retain small estates in Samaria. Tibble underlines that no contemporaneous source mentioned a revolt against Baldwin II in 1126. According to William of Tyre, Roman was one of the discontented noblemen who were accused of conspiring against Baldwin II's son-in-law and successor, King Fulk, in the early 1130s. As a retaliation, their estates were expropriated.

== Sources ==
- Barber, Malcolm (2012). The Crusader States. Yale University Press. ISBN 978-0-300-11312-9.
- Lock, Peter (2006). The Routledge Companion to the Crusades. Routledge. ISBN 9-78-0-415-39312-6.
- Mayer, Hans Eberhard (1985). "The Origins of the Lordships of Ramla and Lydda in the Latin Kingdom of Jerusalem". Speculum. 60 (3): 537–552. doi:10.2307/2848174. ISSN 0038-7134. JSTOR 2848174. S2CID 162263129.
- Milwright, Marcus (2008). The Fortress of the Raven: Karak in the Middle Islamic Period (1100–1650). BRILL. ISBN 978-90-04-16519-9.
- Murray, Alan V. (2000). The Crusader Kingdom of Jerusalem: A Dynastic History, 1099–1125. Prosopographica et Geneologica. ISBN 978-1-9009-3403-9.
- Riley-Smith, Jonathan (1983). "The Motives of the Earliest Crusaders and the Settlement of Latin Palestine, 1095-1100". The English Historical Review. 98 (389): 721–736. doi:10.1093/ehr/XCVIII.CCCLXXXIX.721. ISSN 0013-8266.
- Runciman, Steven (1989). A History of the Crusades, Volume II: The Kingdom of Jerusalem and the Frankish East, 1100-1187. Cambridge University Press. ISBN 0-521-06163-6.

Roman of Le Puy Died: after 1133
New title	Lord of Transjordan c. 1120–c. 1126	Succeeded by Pagan the Butler
