= Siege of Kerak (1187–1188) =

12th century Ayyubid siege of Crusader fortress

- Part of the Crusades
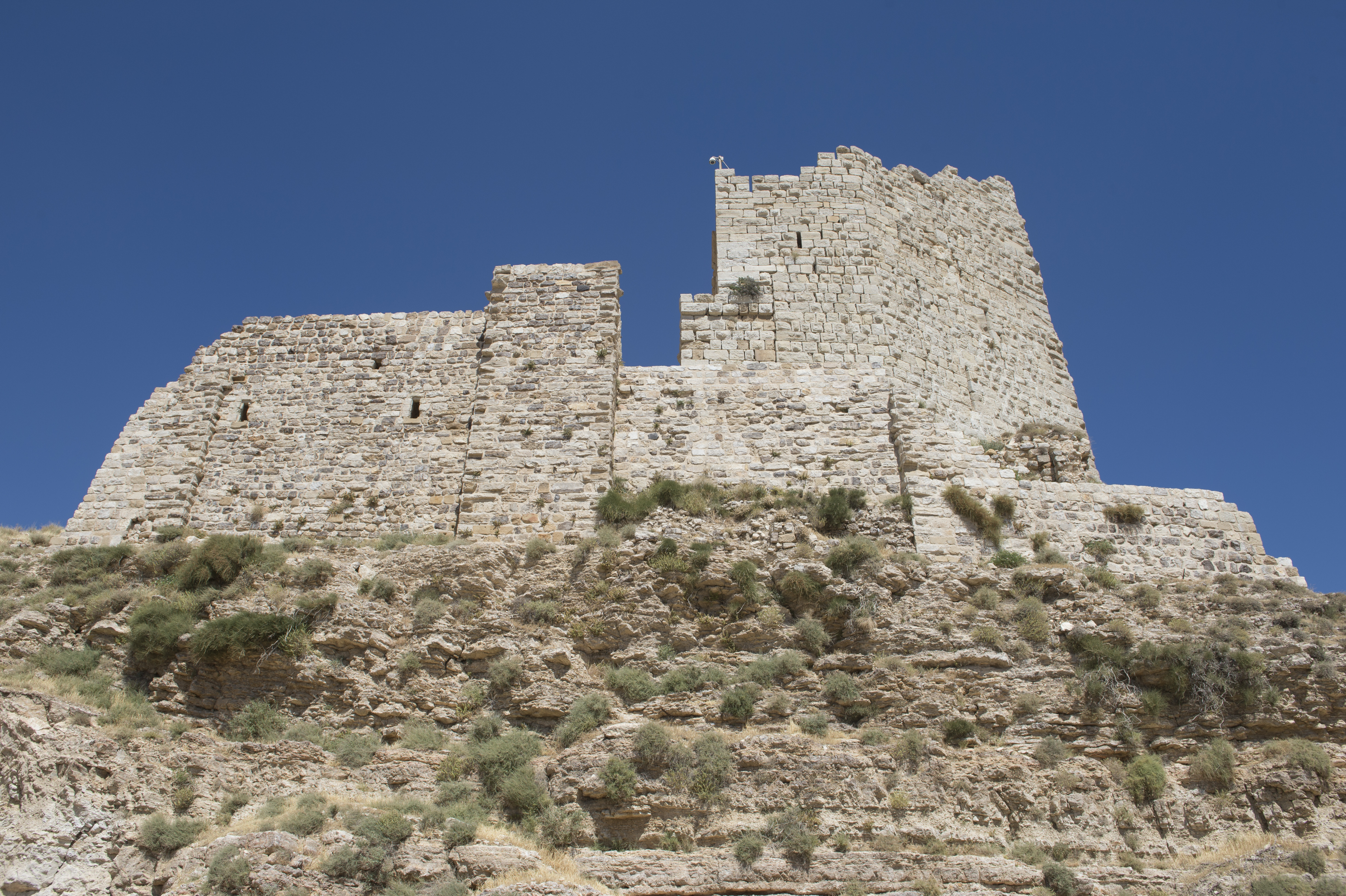
- Kerak Castle
Date	May 1187 – November 1188
Location	Kerak Castle, Lordship of Oultrejordain of the Kingdom of Jerusalem
Result	Ayyubid victory

Belligerents
Kingdom of Jerusalem	Ayyubid Dynasty

Commanders and leaders
Unknown	Sa'd al-Din Kamshaba

The siege of Kerak was conducted by the Ayyubid Sultanate army against the Crusader fortress of Kerak. After a year and a half of blockade, the Crusader fortress surrendered to the Muslims.

In May 1187, Saladin left Transjordan and began his offensive against the Crusaders. Saladin took a force to Bosra which was assigned to protect the returning pilgrimage caravans. The Ayyubid force then moved south to Frankish Oultrejordain where they were joined by a contingent from Egypt. A part of their force began investing in the Crusader fortress of Kerak, while the other raided the Frankish lordship. Sa'd al-Din Kamshaba led the Ayyubid force against Kerak. The Ayyubid forces probably did not have any artillery so they changed their tactics by unleashing a loose blockade to starve the garrison.

The garrison of Kerak posed little threat to the Muslims and the crushing defeat at the Battle of Hattin meant that no relief force would arrive soon, allowing the Ayyubids to take a relaxed approach to their siege and wait for the Crusaders to surrender. The Ayyubids had already failed in their attempt to capture Kerak in 1183 and 1184. However, the Ayyubids attempted to convince the Crusaders of their situation and their defeat at Hattin.

At Hattin, the Ayyubids captured Humphrey IV of Toron. His mother, Stephanie of Milly, and wife were in Jerusalem when the city surrendered in October. Saladin allowed Humphrey to reunite with his mother and wife. Stephanie also arranged the surrender of Kerak in exchange for Humphrey's release. When she arrived there, the garrison refused to surrender. Eventually, the garrison began running out of supplies and left with no other option. In November 1188, after a year and a half months, the garrison surrendered and was allowed free passage. Humphrey then was released. Kerak never again fell under Crusader's control.

== Sources ==
- Lee, Jeffrey (2017). God's Wolf: The Life of the Most Notorious of All Crusaders, Scourge of Saladin.
