= Lordship of Transjordan =

Vassal state of the Crusader Kingdom of Jerusalem (1118–87)

- 1118–1187
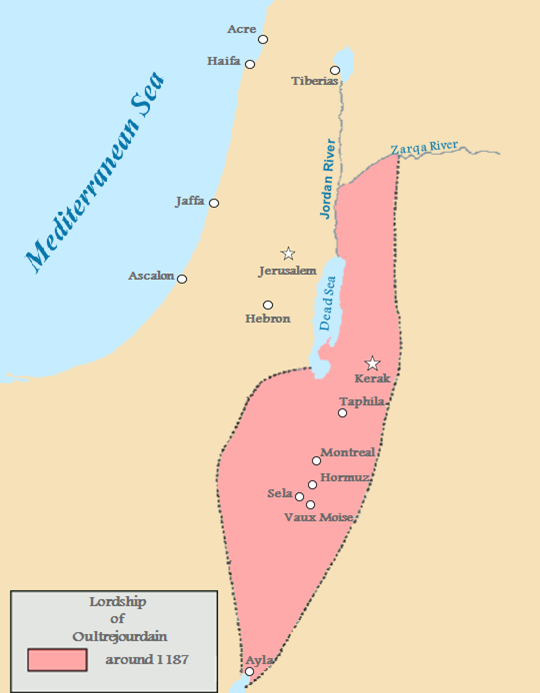
- The Lordship of Transjordan at its greatest extent. Boundaries approximate.
- Status: Vassal of the Kingdom of Jerusalem
- Capital: Montreal (1115 to 1140s); Kerak (1140s to 1188)
- Common languages: Latin, Old French, Italian (also Arabic and Greek)
- Religion: Roman Catholicism, Greek Orthodoxy, Syriac Orthodoxy, Islam, Judaism
- Government: Feudal lordship
- Lord
  - 1118–1126: Roman of Le Puy
  - 1126–1147: Pagan the Butler
  - 1148–c.1160: Maurice of Montreal
  - 1161–1165: Philip of Milly
  - 1174: Miles of Plancy
  - 1177–1187: Raynald of Châtillon
- Historical era: High Middle Ages
  - First Crusade: 1118
  - Conquered by Saladin: 1187
Preceded by	Succeeded by
Fatimid Caliphate	Ayyubid dynasty
- Today part of: Israel; Jordan

From c. 1118 to 1189, the Lordship of Transjordan (Old French: Oultrejourdain, lit. 'beyond [the river] Jordan') was one of the principal lordships of the Kingdom of Jerusalem (a Crusader state). The lordship covered the region of Transjordan, extending eastwards from the Jordan River and southwards from the Dead Sea, as far as the Gulf of Aqaba on the Red Sea. Its other borders were poorly defined due to the Arabian Desert.

Jerusalem was conquered in 1099 by the First Crusade. The first Crusader King of Jerusalem, Baldwin I, invaded the Transjordan multiple times. In 1115, Baldwin I constructed a castle at Montreal to control the region. Around 1118 the castle and its surrounding lands were granted to Roman of Le Puy, establishing the lordship.

It was the largest lordship in the kingdom, but sparsely populated by Bedouin nomads. Most of its income was derived from desert agriculture and charging tolls on trade caravans crossing the desert. In 1142, King Fulk of Jerusalem constructed a stronger castle at Kerak, which became the capital of the lordship. The succession of lords was complex, passing through multiple different families, due to various rebellions and female heirs.

The final lord, Raynald of Châtillon, harassed Muslim traders and pilgrims on the Hajj to Mecca as they passed through the lordship. This gave Saladin a casus belli to invade the kingdom in 1187. Raynald was captured at the decisive Battle of Hattin and personally executed by Saladin. Jerusalem was conquered shortly thereafter, and by 1189 Saladin had occupied all of Transjordan. The Crusaders never recovered the region, though there were a series of pretenders who claimed the titular title.

== Geography and demography ==
Transjordan, as it was known in Latin, was also known in Old French as Oultrejourdain or Oultrejordain, and covered territory that would later become part of the Emirate of Transjordan and the modern country of Jordan.

Transjordan extended southwards through the Negev to the Gulf of Aqaba (Ile de Graye, now Pharaoh's Island). To the north and east (the ancient Gilead) there were no real borders — to the north was the Dead Sea and to the east were caravan and pilgrimage routes, part of the Muslim Hejaz. These areas were also under the control of the sultan of Damascus, and by custom the two opponents rarely met there, for battle or for other purposes.

While under Crusader control, the Bedouin nomads were generally left to themselves, although the king collected taxes on caravans passing through. The land was relatively good for agriculture, and wheat, pomegranates and olives were grown there. Salt was also collected from the Dead Sea.

== History ==
=== First Crusader kingdom (1099-1187) ===
Before the First Crusade, Transjordan was controlled by the Fatimids of Egypt, whose representatives (originally very few, if any at all) withdrew when the Crusaders arrived. The various tribes there quickly made peace with the Crusaders. The first expedition to the area was under Baldwin I of Jerusalem in 1100. Baldwin also invaded again in 1107 and 1112, and built Montreal in 1115 to control the Muslim caravan routes, which provided enormous revenue to the kingdom. The crusaders also controlled the area around Petra, where they set up an archbishopric under the authority of the Latin Patriarch of Jerusalem.

There were very few Christians in Transjordan, most of the inhabitants being Muslim Bedouin nomads. Some Christians from Transjordan were transplanted to Jerusalem in 1115 to repopulate the former Jewish quarter (the Jews having been killed or expelled). The remaining Christians in Transjordan were nomadic or semi-nomadic and were often distrusted by the ruling Crusaders.

According to John of Ibelin, the Lordship of Transjordan was one of the four major Vassals of the Kingdom of Jerusalem. Although its borders were poorly defined, it was the largest seigneury in the kingdom. John, writing in the 13th century, called it a lordship, but it may have been treated as a principality in the 12th century. Due to the relative size and inaccessibility of the area, the lords of Transjordan were semi-autonomous vassals of the kingdom. A tradition arose that the ruler of Transjordan could not hold any other positions in the kingdom at the same time, so they were somewhat cut off from political life.

Baldwin I may have granted the lordship to Roman of Le Puy in 1118, or alternatively it remained under royal control until 1126 when Pagan the Butler was created lord. Around 1134 a revolt occurred against King Fulk under Hugh II of Jaffa (Hugh II of Le Puiset), count of Jaffa, and Roman of Le Puy (possibly the previous lord of Transjordan). They were defeated and exiled. In 1142, Fulk built the castle of Kerak (Crac des Moabites), replacing Montreal as the Crusader stronghold in the area. Other castles in Transjordan included Safed and Subeibe. Toron, near Tyre, and Nablus, in Samaria, were not located in Transjordan, though they were sometimes ruled by the same people, usually through marriage.

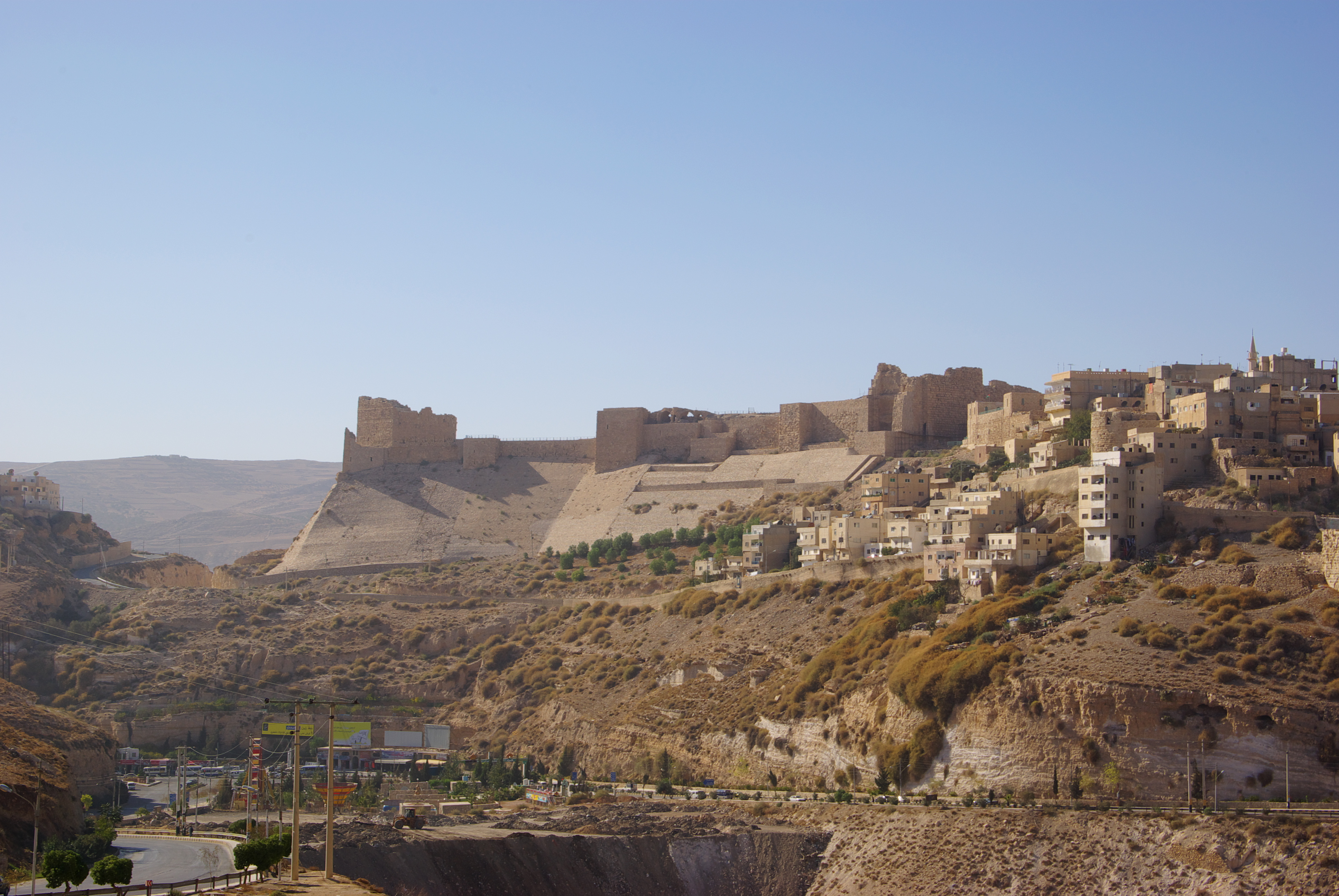
Kerak Castle, Al-Karak, Jordan, in November 2009.

In 1148, the lord of Transjordan was involved in the decision to attack Damascus during the Second Crusade, despite the truce between Jerusalem and Damascus that was vital to the survival of the kingdom and especially the lordship. The crusade ended in defeat and the security of the lordship diminished as a result.

Philip of Milly became ruler of Transjordan in 1161, but was compelled to resign his lands in Nablus at the same time. Philip joined the Knights Templar in 1165, leaving the lordship to his daughter Helena and son-in-law Walter III Brisebarre. Walter ruled the lordship in the name of his and Helena's minor daughter, Beatrice, until Beatrice died. The lordship then passed to Philip's younger daughter, Stephanie of Milly. Stephanie's husbands, Miles of Plancy and Raynald of Châtillon, became lords of Transjordan in turn.

Raynald of Châtillon used his position to attack pilgrims and caravans, and threatened to attack Mecca. This prompted Saladin to invade Transjordan in 1183, during which he briefly besieged Kerak. That invasion ended with a new peace treaty with king Baldwin IV, but Raynald's attacks continued so Saladin declared the treaty void and invaded again in 1187. Saladin began by uniting his armies from Syria and Egypt, then detached a force to besiege Kerak. The main force moved to Tiberias, provoking the Crusader armies into a pitched battle. Raynald was captured at the decisive Battle of Hattin on 4 July; he was executed immediately afterwards, possibly by Saladin himself (there are conflicting reports). After a short siege, Jerusalem surrendered in October and Saladin returned to the Transjordan. Montreal was placed under siege, while the siege of Kerak continued. Kerak held out for 18 months (until November 1188), and Montreal for almost two years (until May 1189), before both garrisons negotiated surrenders and were permitted to depart unharmed. Saladin granted the castles to his own supporters, and the territory was incorporated into the Ayyubid sultanate.

=== Second Crusader kingdom (1191-1291) ===
In 1219, the Fifth Crusade demanded the return of the Transjordan as part of a peace treaty. Al-Kamil, the Sultan of Egypt, offered the city of Jerusalem in return for Damietta, but the Crusaders insisted on the entire former kingdom. Al-Kamil was unwilling to grant that, so fighting continued and the Crusaders were defeated. Neither Jerusalem nor Transjordan was recovered, and the Crusaders were also forced to return Damietta to the Egyptians.

Jerusalem was briefly recovered by the Treaty of Jaffa in 1229, but the remnant of the kingdom never again controlled territory to the east of the Jordan. The Transjordan was claimed by crusader nobles for a long time, the title passing to the line of Isabella of Toron, daughter of Stephanie. For several generations it was claimed by the Montfort family, who were lords of Tyre. After the 1350s, when the Montfort line became extinct without close heirs, the hereditary rights presumably passed to the kings of Cyprus who also were descendants of lords of Toron and Tyre.

== Lords ==
=== Actual rulers ===
- Roman of Le Puy (possibly 1118 – 1126)
- Pagan the Butler (1126–1147)
- Maurice of Montreal (1147–1161)
- Philip of Milly (1161–1165)
- Helena of Milly (1165-?), elder daughter of Philip
  - Walter III Brisebarre, husband of Helena
- Beatrice Brisebarre, minor daughter of Helena and Walter, in whose name Walter ruled after Helena's death
- Stephanie of Milly, aunt of Beatrice
  - possibly Humphrey III of Toron (1168–1173), first husband of Stephanie
  - Miles of Plancy (1173–1174), second husband of Stephanie
  - Raynald of Châtillon (1176–1187), third husband of Stephanie

=== Titular lords ===
- Humphrey IV of Toron (1187–1197), son of Stephanie from her first marriage to Humphrey III of Toron
- Alice of Armenia (possibly 1197 – 1199), niece of Humphrey IV of Toron, titular lady of Toron and Transjordan

== Sub-vassals ==
In the time of Philip of Nablus, Petra was a vassal fief under the princes of Transjordan.

== Sources ==
- John L. La Monte, Feudal Monarchy in the Latin Kingdom of Jerusalem, 1100–1291. The Medieval Academy of America, 1932.
- Jonathan Riley-Smith, The Feudal Nobility and the Kingdom of Jerusalem, 1174–1277. The Macmillan Press, 1973.
- Steven Runciman, A History of the Crusades, Vol. II: The Kingdom of Jerusalem and the Frankish East, 1100–1187. Cambridge University Press, 1952.
- Steven Tibble, Monarchy and Lordships in the Latin Kingdom of Jerusalem, 1099–1291. Clarendon Press, 1989.
