= Walter III Brisebarre =

12th-century Frankish nobleman

Walter III Brisebarre (Note: The genealogy of the Brisebarre family was contentiously debated by 20th-century historians. Mary E. Nickerson posited three lords of Beirut named Walter, making the last Brisebarre lord Walter III. Hans E. Mayer argued that Nickerson's Walter I and Walter II are the same person, concluding that "Walter III must be renumbered Walter II".) was a 12th-century Frankish nobleman who ruled successively as the lord of Beirut, lord of Transjordan, and lord of Blanchegarde in the Kingdom of Jerusalem. Walter inherited Beirut from his father, Guy Brisebarre, in 1157 and Transjordan from his father-in-law, Philip of Milly, in 1166. King Amalric forced Walter to cede Beirut to the crown to prevent a merger of two great fiefs. After the deaths of his wife Helena and their daughter, Beatrice, between 1167 and 1174, Transjordan passed to Helena's sister, Stephanie, and Stephanie's husband Miles of Plancy. Miles ruled the kingdom in 1174 in the name of the minor King Baldwin IV. He was murdered in October 1174 by assassins whom a later source names as the "lords of Beirut". Walter ended his career as the lord of Blanchegarde, a minor fief, but retained some influence at court until he died, probably in the early 1180s.

== Lordship of Beirut ==
Walter was the eldest son of Guy Brisebarre, lord of Beirut. A 1164 charter mentions Marie, lady of Beirut; the historian Hans E. Mayer concludes that she was most likely Walter's mother, although he also had a sister with the same name. Walter succeeded his father as lord of Beirut in 1156 or 1157. Beirut was one of the greatest fiefs of the kingdom, owing 21 knights to the crown, and the lord of Toron, Toron II, held the lordship of Banias in fief from the lord of Beirut. Walter's rule began with the devastating 1157 earthquake; historian Mary E. Nickerson notes that "changes and catastrophes appear almost normal to him during the rest of his life". In October, he and his brothers, Guy and Bernard, authorized Humphrey to grant a half of the lordship of Banias to the Knights Hospitaller.

Like his father before him, Walter was almost constantly in attendance to King Baldwin III. In 1161 he witnessed the agreement by which the king granted the lordship of Transjordan to the magnate Philip of Milly in return for Philip's land in Nablus. Walter was married to Helena of Milly, the elder daughter of Philip. Philip outlived his only son, Rainier, some time after 1161. When in late 1165 he resigned his lordship to join the Knights Templar, his only surviving children were two daughters, Helena and Stephanie. According to the contemporary custom, Helena and Walter stood to inherit from her father the entire lordship of Transjordan. Transjordan, which owed 40 knights, was an even greater fief than Beirut.

King Baldwin III died in Beirut in 1163. His brother and successor, King Amalric, had to overcome opposition from his barons, and the Brisebarres did not attend him as frequently as they had Baldwin. In 1164, while King Amalric was conducting one of his campaigns in Egypt, the Damascene ruler Nur ad-Din Zengi captured numerous noblemen at the Battle of Harim in 1164. The Brisebarre brothers–Walter, Guy and Bernard–were among the prisoners. Their mother apparently took charge of Beirut. According to the Lignages d'Outremer from the late 13th century, they could not afford ransom because they were spendthrifts. Their mother was not able to raise enough money, so she offered to take their place as a hostage until the debt had been paid. King Amalric prohibited his subjects from lending money to the Brisebarres after their release. This forced them to accept the king's offer to pay the ransom in return for their exchange of Beirut for the much smaller fief of Blanchegarde. Walter's mother was then freed, but died only a month later. 12th-century charters, however, show that Walter exchanged Beirut not for Blanchegarde but for a money fief in the vicinity of the city of Acre. The historian Bernard Hamilton infers that King Amalric wished to prevent the union of two great lordships, Beirut and Transjordan, under Walter's rule. By 1167, Beirut was in the royal domain.

== Lordship of Transjordan ==
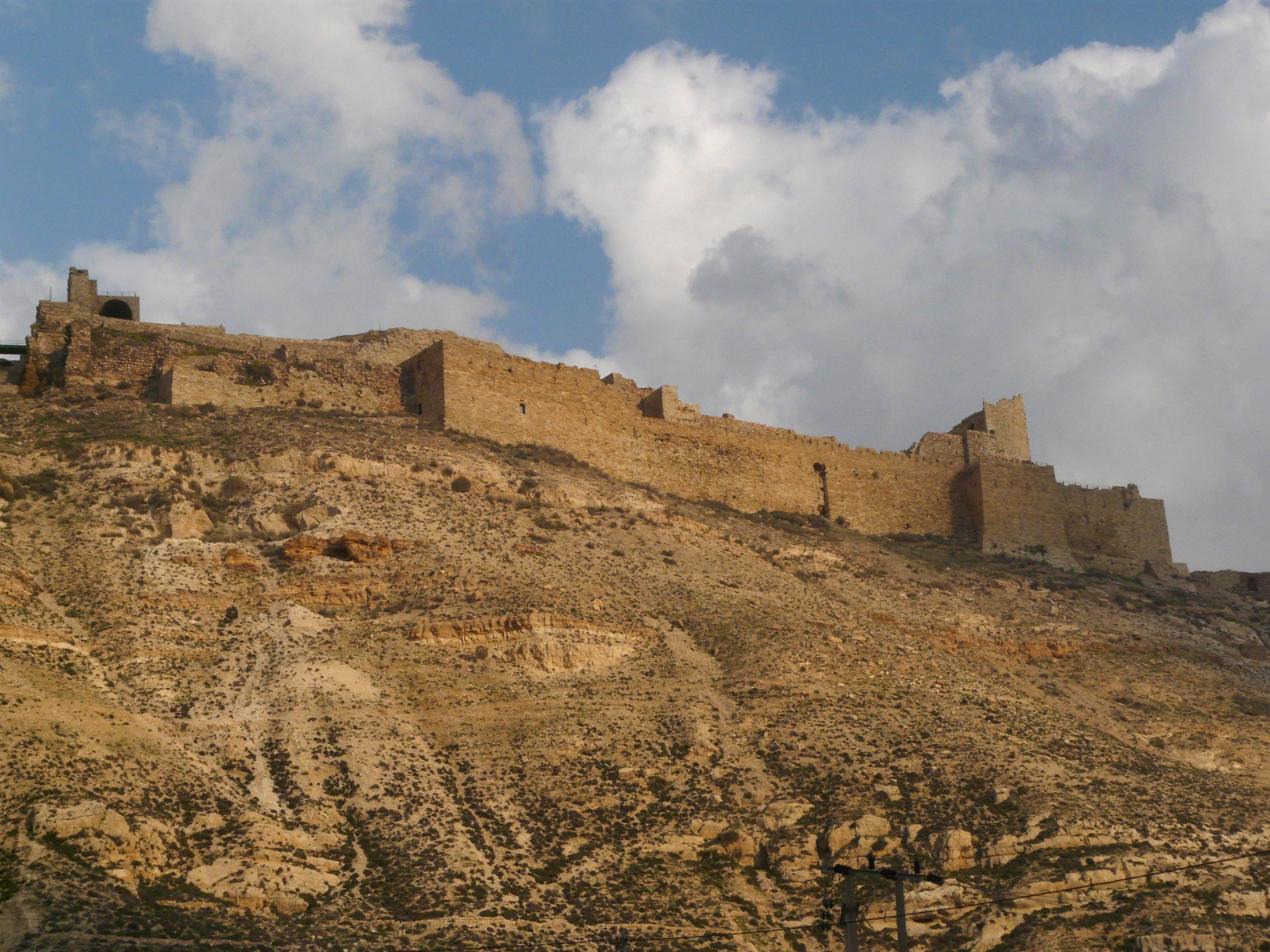
Kerak Castle, seat of the lord of Transjordan.

Through his marriage with Helena of Milly, Walter became lord of Transjordan in 1166. The principal center of power were Amman and the castles of Kerak and Montreal. Walter's rule in Transjordan saw the establishment of the Archbishopric of Petra at Kerak. He and Helena had one child, a daughter named Beatrice. Helena had died by 18 November 1167, making Walter's position less secure; he remained lord, but only as the bailli for his young daughter. Upon Beatrice's death, which happened before 24 February 1174, the lordship passed to her aunt Stephanie.

In early 1170 Nur ad-Din invaded Transjordan and laid siege to Kerak. Humphrey II of Toron, acting as the constable of the kingdom, sent a relief force. The Arab chronicler Ibn al-Athir narrates that it was led by Philip of Milly, who had risen to become master of the Knights Templar, and Humphrey III of Toron, husband of Philip's younger daughter, Stephanie. Nur ad-Din was forced to abandon the siege. The Egyptian ruler Saladin invaded Transjordan twice in the early 1170s. Chroniclers differ in their accounts: according to Ibn al-Athir, Saladin besieged Montreal in 1171 and Kerak in 1173; William of Tyre says that the 1173 invasion amounted to a raid. Saladin retreated both times. It is not known who ruled the lordship of Transjordan at this time.

== Lordship of Blanchegarde ==
Hamilton presumes that King Amalric granted the lordship of Blanchegard to Walter to compensate for the latter's loss of Transjordan. Blanchegarde was a modest fief that provided the crown with the military service of just eight knights. The principal beneficiary of Walter's misfortune was the royal seneschal, Miles of Plancy, who married Stephanie and became the new lord of Transjordan in early 1174. Upon the death of King Amalric on 11 July, Miles assumed government on behalf of the minor new king, Baldwin IV. This put him in a position to restore Beirut to the Brisebarres, but he was a loyal steward and refused to dissipate the young king's lands. This, according to Hamilton, was a reason for the Brisebarres to resent Miles.

Miles, whom William of Tyre describes as "proud and conceited", proved unpopular. William narrates that Miles was warned that "certain men" plotted against his life, but refused to act cautiously, and was murdered in a street in Acre in October. No one was tried for the murder and William does not name the perpetrators. Hamilton explains that William could not have named the murderers even if he knew who they were because bringing a charge of murder without satisfactory evidence could have led to severe consequences for the accuser. Brevis historia, written in Genoa around 1200, when everyone involved was dead, names the "lords of Beirut" as the assassins. Hamilton interprets this as referring to Walter and Guy; he argues that Bernard had died by then. William implies that the assassins may have been incited by some of the seneschal's more powerful enemies.

After the murder, Count Raymond III of Tripoli became regent for King Baldwin. He owed this position partly to the Brisebarre brothers if it was they who eliminated Miles, but Raymond did nothing to further their prospects. Raymond married the princess of Galilee, Eschiva of Bures, in 1174 and Hamilton credits him with arranging Walter's marriage with Agnes, Eschiva's niece. The Lignages attribute to Walter and Agnes a son, Gilles, and four daughters: Raymonde (married to Bertrand Masoir of Margat), Margaret, Eschiva, and Orable.

King Baldwin, who started ruling on his own in 1176, also retained Beirut for himself. Despite their reduced status, Walter and Guy retained a position of honor at Baldwin's court: Walter continued to witness royal charters as "Walter of Beirut" up to 1179, outranking all other witnesses except the new seneschal, Joscelin of Courtenay; the king's stepfather, Reginald of Sidon, and Baldwin and Balian of Ibelin. Walter and Guy are last mentioned in extant documents in 1179 and 1182, respectively, and Hamilton presumes that neither lived to the end of Baldwin IV's reign. Mayer dates Walter's death to the period between 1179 and 1186. He accepts Nickerson's identification of Bernard of Blanchegarde, who appears in a 1186 charter, as the brother and successor of Walter, but Hamilton says that there is not enough evidence to support it. Noble families in the 13th-century Kingdom of Cyprus claimed descent from Walter.

Walter's close family

Philip of Milly | Guy Brisebarre | Maria
Stephanie of Milly m. (1) Humphrey III of Toron (2) Miles of Plancy | Helena of Milly | Walter Brisebarre | Agnes | Guy Brisebarre m. Juliana Grenier | Bernard Brisebarre | Maria Brisebarre m. (1) Baldwin of Ibelin (2) William of Saint-Omer | other siblings
Beatrice Brisebarre | descendants | lords of Caesarea

== Bibliography ==
- Fulton, Michael S. (2024). Crusader Castle: The Desert Fortress of Kerak. Pen and Sword. ISBN 978-1-3990-9129-9.
- Hamilton, Bernard (1992). "Miles of Plancy and the fief of Beirut". The Horns of Ḥaṭṭīn. Proceedings of the Second Conference of the Society for the Study of the Crusades and the Latin East. Yad Izhak Ben-Zvi. ISBN 978-965-217-085-9.
- Hamilton, Bernard (2000). The Leper King and His Heirs: Baldwin IV and the Crusader Kingdom of Jerusalem. Cambridge University Press. ISBN 9780521017473.
- Mayer, Hans Eberhard (1990). "The Wheel of Fortune: Seignorial Vicissitudes under Kings Fulk and Baldwin III of Jerusalem". Speculum. 65 (4). University of Chicago Press: 860–877. doi:10.2307/2863565. ISSN 0038-7134. JSTOR 2863565.
- Nickerson, Mary E. (1949). "The Seigneury of Beirut in the Twelfth Century and the Brisebarre Family of Beirut-Blanchegarde". Byzantion. 19: 141–185. JSTOR 44168651.
- Runciman, Steven (1952). A History of the Crusades. Vol. II: The Kingdom of Jerusalem. Cambridge University Press. ISBN 0521347718.

| Preceded by Guy Brisebarre | Lord of Beirut; 1157–1164/67 | Vacant Royal domain Title next held by Andronikos Komnenos |
| Preceded by Philip of Milly | Lord of Transjordan; 1166–1166/67 with Helena of Milly | Succeeded by Beatrice Brisebarre |
| New title | Lord of Blanchegarde; 1174-1179/86 | Succeeded by Bernard Brisebarre |
