= Beatrice Brisebarre =

1160s lady of Transjordan

Beatrice Brisebarre (fl. 1167) was the lady of Transjordan in the Kingdom of Jerusalem in the 1160s. She was the only child of Walter III Brisebarre and Helena of Milly.

Her parents inherited the lordship of Transjordan in 1166 from her maternal grandfather, Philip of Milly, after her father renounced his lordship of Beirut. Beatrice's mother had died by 18 November 1167, when Walter issued a grant to the Order of Saint Lazarus for the repose of her soul. This grant, which mentions Beatrice's consent, is the only appearance of Beatrice in historical record. Transjordan passed to Beatrice upon Helena's death. Walter continued to rule the lordship but only as bailli in Beatrice's name. The historian Bernard Hamilton presumes that such an arrangement would have lasted until Beatrice married.

Transjordan was invaded three times in the early 1170s. The Damascene ruler Nur ad-Din laid a siege to Kerak Castle in early 1170, which was relieved by Beatrice's maternal grandfather, Philip, and uncle Humphrey III of Toron. The Egyptian ruler Saladin unsuccessfully besieged Montreal in 1171 and possibly Kerak in 1173. It is not known who ruled the lordship of Transjordan at the time of these attacks. Because she is not mentioned in sources after 1167, Hamilton says that "it must be assumed" that Beatrice died in childhood. The date of her death is not recorded: it was between 18 November 1167 and 24 February 1174, when her father appears in a charter without the title of lord of Transjordan. The fief passed from Beatrice to her maternal aunt, Stephanie of Milly.

== Bibliography ==
- Fulton, Michael S. (2024). Crusader Castle: The Desert Fortress of Kerak. Pen and Sword. ISBN 978-1-3990-9129-9.
- Hamilton, Bernard (1992). "Miles of Plancy and the fief of Beirut". The Horns of Ḥaṭṭīn. Proceedings of the Second Conference of the Society for the Study of the Crusades and the Latin East. Yad Izhak Ben-Zvi. ISBN 978-965-217-085-9.

Preceded by Helena of Milly; Walter III Brisebarre	Lady of Transjordan; 1166/67-1167/74	Succeeded by Stephanie of Milly
