= Guy I Brisebarre =

Lord of Beirut

Guy Brisebarre (died after 1148), known as Guy I or Guy the Elder, was Lord of Beirut in the Kingdom of Jerusalem.

In 1127, King Baldwin II of Jerusalem sent him to France, together with the Templar Masters Hugh of Payns and William I of Bures, to find a husband for the heir to the throne of Jerusalem, Baldwin's daughter Melisende. In the spring of 1129, they traveled back to the Holy Land with Count Fulk V of Anjou, where they arrived in May.

By 1138, Guy I was appointed as lord of Beirut, succeeding his brother Walter I. In 1148, he took part in the Council of Acre, and the subsequent Siege of Damascus, in which he was nominated by local barons to rule the city when conquered.

He probably had two sons who inherited him after his death:

- Walter II (died 1169), Lord of Beirut, later Templar
- Guy the Younger (died before 1192), married the lady of Caesarea

== Bibliography ==
- Murray, Alan V. (2000). The Crusader Kingdom of Jerusalem: A Dynastic History 1099–1125. Occasional Publications UPR. ISBN 9781900934039.
