= Helena of Milly =

12th-century Frankish noblewoman

Helena of Milly (died c. 1167) was a Frankish noblewoman who was the lady of Transjordan in the Kingdom of Jerusalem from 1166 to her death around 1167.

Helena was the elder daughter of the lord of Nablus, Philip of Milly, and his wife Isabella (Elizabeth). Helena and her siblings, Stephanie and Renier, were all born by 1153. In 1161 Helena's father ceded his lands in Nablus to King Baldwin III and received the lordship of Transjordan in return. Transjordan was one of the greatest fiefs in the crusader kingdom. Among the numerous prominent witnesses to this act were Humphrey III of Toron, who married Stephanie, and Walter III Brisebarre of Beirut, who married Helena.

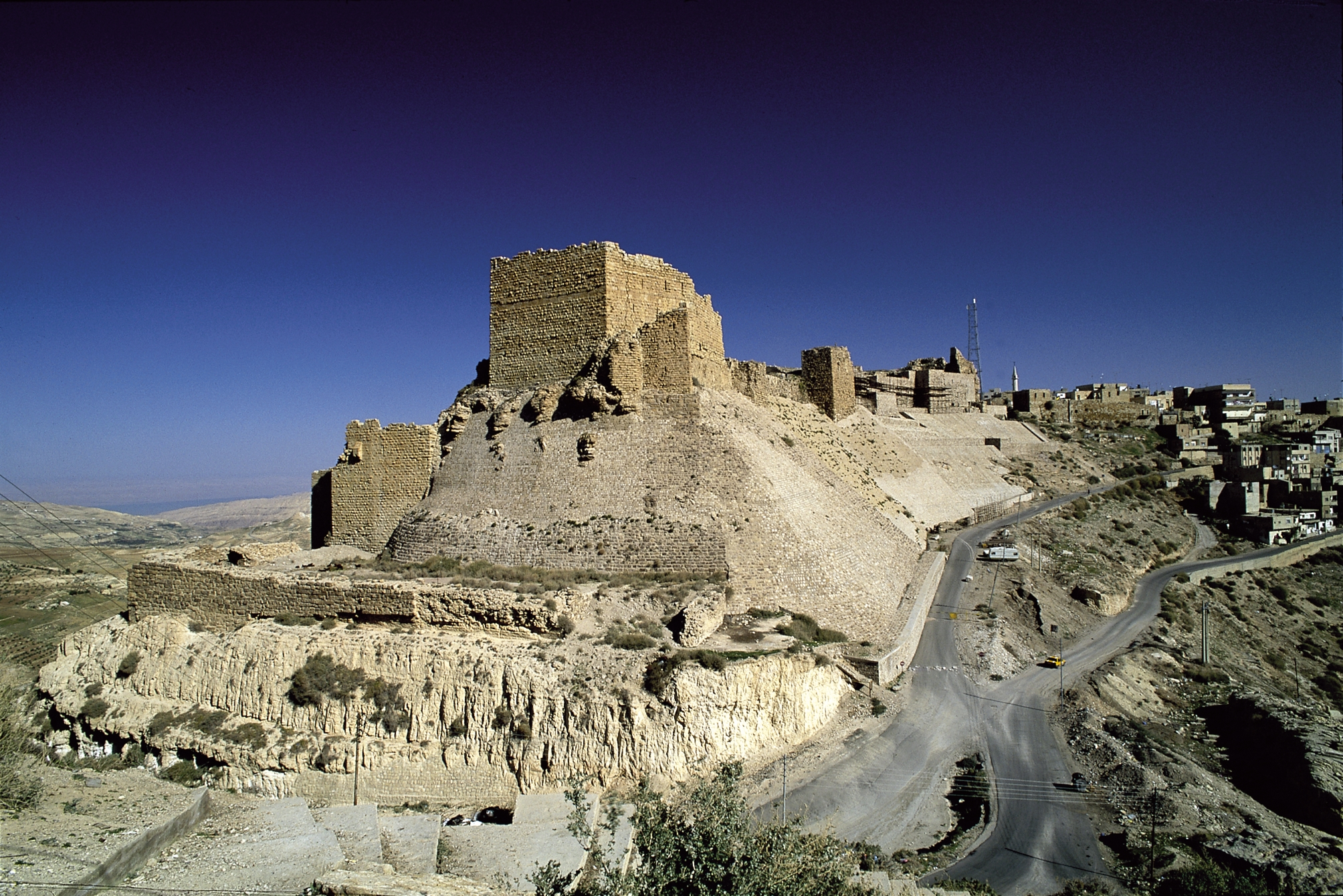
Kerak Castle was the seat of the lady of Transjordan.

Helena married Walter Brisebarre probably before 1164, when Walter was still lord of Beirut. They had one child, a daughter named Beatrice. Helena's father, Philip, relinquished the lordship of Transjordan and entered the Order of the Temple in 1166. Her only brother, Renier, had presumably died childless by that time. The custom of the kingdom at that time did not yet prescribe the equal division of a fief among daughters if the fiefholder had no sons, and so Helena enjoyed the same rights as an eldest son and inherited the entire fief jointly with her husband, Walter. Walter's cession of Beirut to the crown at this time may have been a condition imposed by King Amalric to prevent the merger of two great fiefs.

Helena had died by 18 November 1167, when Walter issued a grant to the Order of Saint Lazarus for the repose of her soul. Her death undermined Walter's position in Transjordan. He continued to rule the lordship but only as the bailli for his and Helena's daughter, Beatrice. By 1174, Beatrice too had died, and the fief passed to Helena's younger sister, Stephanie.

== Bibliography ==
- Fulton, Michael S. (2024). Crusader Castle: The Desert Fortress of Kerak. Pen and Sword. ISBN 978-1-3990-9129-9.
- Hamilton, Bernard (1992). "Miles of Plancy and the fief of Beirut". The Horns of Ḥaṭṭīn. Proceedings of the Second Conference of the Society for the Study of the Crusades and the Latin East. Yad Izhak Ben-Zvi. ISBN 978-965-217-085-9.
- Hamilton, Bernard (2000). The Leper King and His Heirs: Baldwin IV and the Crusader Kingdom of Jerusalem. Cambridge University Press. ISBN 9780521017473.
- Mayer, Hans Eberhard (28 October 2024). Kings and Lords in the Latin Kingdom of Jerusalem. Taylor & Francis. ISBN 978-1-040-24837-9.
- Nickerson, Mary E. (1949). "The Seigneury of Beirut in the Twelfth Century and the Brisebarre Family of Beirut-Blanchegarde". Byzantion. 19: 141–185. JSTOR 44168651.

| Preceded by Philip of Milly | Lady of Transjordan; 1166–1166/67 with Walter Brisebarre | Succeeded by Beatrice Brisebarre |
