= Regni Ierosolimitani brevis hystoria =

Start of the Brevis historia in the archival copy

The Regni Ierosolimitani brevis hystoria ('Short History of the Kingdom of Jerusalem'), called Brevis historia for short, is an anonymous Latin history of the Kingdom of Jerusalem from its founding until about 1193 with a short continuation by Jacopo Doria that brings the story down to the kingdom's fall in 1291. At Doria's request, a copy of the work was placed in the Republic of Genoa's archives in 1294. This copy survives, as does a 15th-century copy of it. There is an English translation based on the Latin edition of Luigi Tommaso Belgrano.

The author of the Brevis historia cites the Annals and the De liberatione civitatum orientis of Caffaro, to which he seems to regard his work as a supplement. Some of his material seems to be derived from William of Tyre and he shares details with the continuation of William known as the Lyon Eracles. Other material is unique and may come from oral sources, such as Genoese travellers to the Holy Land, or from reports or letters sent by Genoese in the Holy Land.

The early part of the history, as well as Doria's continuation, is concerned mainly with genealogies and marriages. The reigns of Amalric (1163–1174) and Baldwin IV (1174–1185) form the central part of the narrative and are more detailed. The original chronicle begins by describing how Godfrey of Bouillon "was chosen as king and lord" after the fall of Jerusalem in 1099. It ends by describing how Prince Bohemond III of Antioch inherited the County of Tripoli and passed it onto his son, Bohemond IV, in 1189. Then the continuator declares that "[w]hat follows was not written in the book, but I, [J]acopo Doria, have briefly reproduced it in written form as I have discovered it from reliable sources." He ends his short continuation by noting how the claimants of the Kingdom of Jerusalem "pointlessly hung on to just the title for the future". A notary, Guglielmo de Caponibus, then records how the chronicle was placed in the archive in 1294.

The author of the Brevis historia is unknown. He may have been one of the Genoese involved in the aftermath of the Battle of Hattin (1187), in the expedition of Conrad of Montferrat or the Third Crusade. He has a high opinion of Count Raymond III of Tripoli and a low opinion of the Templar master Gerard de Ridefort. Alternatively, it has been suggested that he was Oberto Doria, Jacopo's brother.

== Bibliography ==
- Bellomo, Elena (1999). "La 'Regni Ierosolimitani brevis hystoria': note circa l'attribuzione e la prospettiva storica di un' 'anonima cronaca genovese'". Bulletino dell'Istituto Storico Italiano per il Medio Evo e Archivio Muratoriano. 102: 43–79.
- Belgrano, Luigi Tommaso, ed. (1890). "Annali Genovesi di Caffaro e de suoi continuatori". Fonti per la storia d'Italia. Vol. 11. Rome. pp. 127–149.
- Hall, Martin; Phillips, Jonathan (2013). Caffaro, Genoa and the Twelfth-Century Crusades. Ashgate.
- Mack, Merav (2011). "A Genoese Perspective of the Third Crusade". Crusades. 10: 45–62. doi:10.1080/28327861.2011.12220447.
