= Philip of Milly =

Seventh Grand Master of the Knights Templar (1120–1171)

Grand Master of the Knights Templar
- In office 1169–1171
- Preceded by: Bertrand de Blanchefort
- Succeeded by: Odo de St Amand

Lord of Oultrejordain
- In office 1161–1168
- Preceded by: Maurice of Montreal
- Succeeded by: Walter III Brisebarre

Personal details
- Born: c. 1120
- Died: 3 April 1171
- Spouse: Isabella
- Children: Rainer; Helena; Stephanie
- Parents: Guy of Milly; Stephanie the Fleming

Military service
- Branch/service: Kingdom of Jerusalem; Knights Templar
- Years of service: 1147–1171
- Battles/wars: Second Crusade (1147-49); Jerusalem Civil War (1152); Siege of Ascalon (1153); Siege of Paneas (1157); Crusader invasion of Egypt (1165-68); Siege of Bilbeis (1168); Siege of Gaza (1170)

Philip of Milly, also known as Philip of Nablus (Latin: Philippus Neapolitanus; c. 1120 – April 3, 1171), was a baron in the Kingdom of Jerusalem and the seventh Grand Master of the Knights Templar. He briefly employed the troubadour Peire Bremon lo Tort in the Holy Land.

== Early life ==
Philip was the son of Guy of Milly, who witnessed a dozen of royal charters in the Kingdom of Jerusalem between 1108 and 1126. Guy's origins are not certain. The historian Malcolm Barber considers it most likely that he came from Normandy or, alternatively, Picardy. Guy held fiefs in the royal demesne around Nablus and Jerusalem. Philip's mother was a Flemish noblewoman, Stephanie, according to the late 13th-century Lignages d'Outremer. The same source stated that Philip was his parents' eldest son, but the sobriquet of his brother, Guy Francigena (or "born in France")—implies that Guy was Philip's elder brother, born before their parents came to the Holy Land. The Lignages d'Outremer also claimed that Philip was a nephew of Pagan the Butler, but no other primary source refers to Pagan as Philip's uncle.

The date of Guy's death is unknown, but he was most probably still alive in the early 1130s. Philip inherited his father's estates around Nablus. He married a noblewoman, Isabella, before 1144. Her name is the only known fact about her, but Steven Runciman writes that she was a niece of Pagan the Butler.

Philip first appeared in a royal charter in 1138. He and his brothers are absent from the lists of witnesses of royal charters in the 1130s. Their absence shows that they could not secure their father's position during the reign of King Fulk, who seized the throne through his marriage with Queen Melisende and appointed his own men to the most important offices.

== Royal vassal ==
=== Lord of Nablus ===
Philip's career started only after Fulk died and Melisende became the actual ruler of Jerusalem. He was first mentioned as lord of Nablus in 1144. Late in that year, the queen appointed Philip along with Elinand, Prince of Galilee, and Manasses of Hierges, to lead a relieve army to Edessa, but Imad ad-Din Zengi captured the town before they approached it. During the following years, he seized further fiefs, including lands in the hills near Nablus and Tyre. In 1148, upon the arrival of the Second Crusade, Philip participated in the council held at Acre, where he and the other native barons were overruled and the ill-fated decision to attack on Damascus was made.

Along with the powerful Ibelin family, Philip was a supporter of Melisende during her conflict with her son Baldwin III. In the division of the kingdom in 1151, Melisende gained control of its southern part, including Nablus. Despite this arrangement, Philip assisted Baldwin during the siege of Ascalon in 1153. He granted estates to Order of Saint Lazarus in 1153. From 1155, Philip was regularly listed among the witnesses on Baldwin's charters. He participated in the relief of Banyas in June 1157, but he and his troops soon returned home, and were not present at Nur ad-Din's subsequent ambush of Baldwin at Jacob's Ford.

=== Lord of Oultrejordain ===
Philip exchanged the lordship of Nablus with Baldwin III for Oultrejordain on 31 July 1161. For Melisende was dying, the agreement was confirmed by her sister, Hodierna, on her behalf. The king retained the revenues from tolling the caravans and the Bedouin tribes crossing Oultrejordain. One of Philip's new vassals, John Gothman, was required to directly swear fealty to the king. Philip strengthened Kerak Castle with a ditch and towers. He made a pilgrimage to Saint Catherine's Monastery in the early 1160s.

== Knight Templar ==
Philip joined the military order of the Knights Templar in January 1166, passing on to them a significant part of Oultrejordain, including the castle of Ahamant. Acting against the decision of the Templars, Philip joined Amalric's invasion of Egypt in 1167. The Ibelin family later recalled an event during the siege of Bilbeis, in which Philip saved the life of Hugh of Ibelin, who had broken his leg when his horse fell in a ditch. The Templars as a whole refused to support Amalric's invasion, and the king blamed them for the failure of the expedition. After the death of their Grand Master Bertrand de Blanchefort in January 1169, Amalric pressured them to elect Philip in his place in August of that year. With the election of Philip, Amalric regained Templar support for the invasion of Egypt, although by the end of the year Amalric was forced to retreat.

For unknown reasons Philip resigned as Grand Master in 1171, and was succeeded by Odo de St Amand. Philip accompanied Amalric to Constantinople as ambassador to the Byzantine Empire in order to restore good relations with them after the failure of the Egyptian invasion. He probably died on April 3, before reaching Constantinople.

== Family ==
Philip's personal life is largely a mystery. William of Tyre describes him as one of the "brave men, valiant in arms and trained from their earliest years in the art of war" who accompanied Amalric to Egypt. Sometime after he became lord of Oultrejordain, he made a pilgrimage to the monastery of Saint Catherine's Monastery on Mount Sinai. With his wife Isabella he had a son, Rainier (who predeceased him), and two daughters, Helena and Stephanie. Isabella died probably in 1166, which may have led to Philip's decision to take vows as a brother of the Knights Templar. His lands were inherited by his elder daughter, Helena, wife of Walter III Brisebarre, lord of Beirut, and then by Stephanie and her husbands.

== Sources ==
- Barber, Malcolm (2003). "The career of Philip of Nablus in the kingdom of Jerusalem". In Edbury, Peter; Phillips, Jonathan (eds.). The Experience of Crusading. Vol. 2. Cambridge University Press. pp. 60–78. ISBN 0-521-78151-5.
- Hamilton, Bernard (2000). The Leper King and His Heirs: Baldwin IV and the Crusader Kingdom of Jerusalem. Cambridge University Press. ISBN 978-0-521-64187-6.
- Murray, Alan V. (2000). The Crusader Kingdom of Jerusalem: A Dynastic History, 1099–1125. Prosopographica et Geneologica. ISBN 978-1-9009-3403-9.
- Riley-Smith, Jonathan (1973). The Feudal Nobility and the Kingdom of Jerusalem 1174–1277. MacMillan Press.
- Runciman, Steven (1999). A History of the Crusades. Vol. II: The Kingdom of Jerusalem and the Frankish East, 1100–1187. Cambridge University Press.
- Setton, Kenneth M., general ed. (1969) A History of the Crusades. 6 vols. Madison, Wis.: University of Wisconsin Press, 1969–1989
- Kenneth M. Setton, general editor (1969) A History of the Crusades. Vol.1: The first hundred years; edited by Marshall W. Baldwin. Madison, Wis.: University of Wisconsin Press

Titles of nobility
Vacant Title last held by Maurice of Montreal	Lord of Transjordan; 1161–1166	Succeeded by Helena of Milly; Walter III Brisebarre
Military offices
Preceded by Bertrand de Blanchefort	Grand Master of the Knights Templar; 1169–1171	Succeeded by Odo de St Amand
