= Malcolm Barber =

British historian (born 1943)

Malcolm Charles Barber (born 4 March 1943) is a British medievalist. He has been described as the world's leading living expert on the Knights Templar. He is considered to have written the two most comprehensive books on the subject, The Trial of the Templars (1978) and The New Knighthood: A History of the Order of the Temple (1994). He has been an editor for The Journal of Medieval History and written many articles on the Templars, the Cathars, various elements of the Crusades, and the reign of Philip IV of France.

== Biography ==
Born in 1943, Barber attended Walpole Grammar School in Ealing from 1954–1961, followed by the University of Nottingham from 1961–1966, where he received his first-class degree in 1964. His post-grad studies were under Bernard Hamilton in the area of grandmasters of the Templars. Barber attended the British School at Rome from 1965–1966, then was appointed assistant lecturer at the University of Reading in 1966. He received his PhD in 1968 from the University of Nottingham.

Barber was a Professor of Medieval European History in the Faculty of Arts and Humanities at the University of Reading in the UK, until his retirement in September 2004.

== Positions ==
- Director of the Graduate Centre for Medieval Studies at Reading, 1986–1989
- British Academy Research Readership, 1989–1991
- Leverhulme Research Fellowship, 1997–1998
- Senior Fellowship, National Humanities Center, North Carolina, 1998–1999

=== Journal editor ===
- (with P. Noble and J. Norton-Smith), Reading Medieval Studies, 1977–1985
- Annual Bulletin of the Society for the Study of the Crusade and the Latin East, 1986–1990
- The Journal of Medieval History, 1996–2002

== Works ==
- The Trial of the Templars, Cambridge University Press. 1st edition, 1978. 2nd edition, 2006
- The Two Cities. Medieval Europe 1050-1320. Routledge. 1st edition, 1992. 2nd edition, 2004
- The New Knighthood. A History of the Order of the Temple. Cambridge University Press, 1994
- Crusaders and Heretics, Twelfth to Fourteenth Centuries. Collected Studies. Aldershot, 1995
- The Cathars. Dualist Heretics in Languedoc in the High Middle Ages. Longman, 2000
- The Crusader States. Yale University Press, 2012

=== Edited ===
- The Military Orders. Fighting for the Faith and Caring for the Sick. Variorum, 1994
- (with K. Bate), The Templars, Manchester University Press, 2002
- (with M. Ailes), The History of the Holy War. Ambroise's Estoire de la Guerre Sainte, 2 volumes. The Boydell Press, 2003.
