= Jordanian intervention in the Syrian civil war =

Conflict between Jordan and the Islamic State

- Part of the War against the Islamic State (foreign involvement in the Syrian civil war)
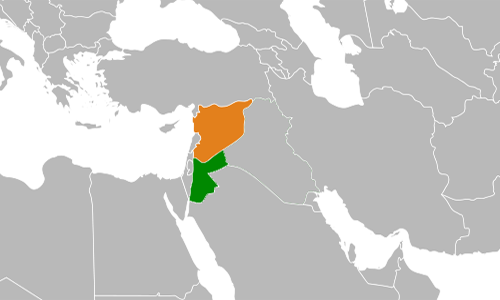
- Jordan in green and Syria in orange
| Date | 22 September 2014 – 31 July 2018 (3 years, 10 months, 1 week and 2 days) |
| Location | Iraq, Syria |
| Result | Jordanian victory; 2018 Jordanian airstrikes in Syria; Start of Operation Martyr Muath; Death of former ISIS leaders |

Belligerents
| Jordan | Islamic State |

Commanders and leaders
| (Jordan) Abdullah II (Jordan) Abdullah Ensour (Jordan) Hani Mulki (Jordan) Omar Razzaz (Jordan) Bisher Al-Khasawneh (Jordan) Mashal Al-Zaben (Jordan) Mahmoud Freihat (Jordan) Yousef Huneiti (Jordan) Muath al-Kasasbeh (executed) (Jordan) Bashar Hassan † (Jordan) Maher Ali † (Jordan) Rami Youssef † (Jordan) Marwan Nour † | (Islamic State) Abu Bakr al-Baghdadi (Leader of IS) (Islamic State) Abu al-Hussein al-Husseini al-Qurashi (Islamic State) Abu al-Hasan al-Hashimi al-Qurashi (Islamic State) Abu Ibrahim al-Hashimi al-Qurashi (Islamic State) Abu Ali al-Anbari † (Islamic State) Abu Omar al-Shishani † (Islamic State) Abu Waheeb † |

Strength
| Jordanian Forces: 20+ F-16s | Up to 200,000 fighters in Iraq and Syria |

Casualties and losses
| 1 serviceman executed; 1 F-16 fighter plane crashed; 4 Jordanian border guards and 2 Civil Defence and Public Security Directorate officers killed (ISIS claimed suicide attack) | Unknown |

Jordanian military intervention in the Syrian civil war began on 22 September 2014, with airstrikes on Islamic State of Iraq and the Levant (ISIL) targets, and escalated after the murder of Muath al-Kasasbeh, a Jordanian pilot who was captured by ISIL when his F-16 Fighter Jet crashed over Syria in early 2015. Though Jordan's strikes in Syria largely tapered off after December 2015, airstrikes have continued through February 2017, and Jordan has continued to support rebel groups in Syria and host military activities of other countries.

== History ==
ISIL considers Jordanian King Abdullah II an enemy of Islam and an infidel. In June 2014 the organization released a video on YouTube in which they threatened to slaughter Abdullah, whom they denounced as a "tyrant." Jordanian ISIL members in the video vowed to launch suicide attacks inside Jordan.

== Jordanian motivation for attacking ISIL ==
In 2014, Islamic State of Iraq and the Levant leader Abu Bakr al-Baghdadi planned to extend the group's control beyond Syria and Iraq, notably to Jordan, with its homegrown Islamic fundamentalism and shared borders easily crossed by terrorists.

Also in 2014, Jordanian political analyst Oraib al-Rantawi explained the imminent ISIS threat to the kingdom:

"We in Jordan cannot afford the luxury of just waiting and monitoring. The danger is getting closer to our bedrooms. It has become a strategic danger; it is no longer a security threat from groups or cells. We must start thinking outside the box. The time has come to increase coordination and cooperation with the regimes in Baghdad and Damascus to contain the crawling of extremism and terrorism."

On 23 September 2014, Jordan's Minister of State for Media Affairs and Communications, Mohammad Momani, declared: "We took part in the strikes which are part of our efforts to defeat terrorism in its strongholds."

Jordan's statement coincided with a U.S. announcement that they had begun strikes in Syria with partner nations, leading the Jordan Times to conclude that Jordan had joined the U.S.-led coalition against ISIL.

== First Jordanian airstrikes ==
The Jordanian Air Force joined in the US-led bombing of ISIL in Syria on 22 September 2014. Jihadist troops have retaliated by firing into Jordan and there has been increased sniping at the border.

== Escalation ==
=== Capture and murder of Lieutenant Al-Kasasbeh ===
On 24 December 2014, a Jordanian F-16 fighter jet operating over Syria crashed after suffering a mechanical problem and the pilot, Royal Jordanian Air Force Lieutenant Muath Al-Kasasbeh, was captured by ISIL. Before he was burned to death, al-Kasasbeh was made to reveal the names and workplaces of a number of his fellow Royal Jordanian Air Force pilots. Their names and photographs were displayed at the end of the video, with an ISIS bounty offer of 100 gold dinars (approximately $20,000) for each Jordanian Air Force pilot killed.

Most Western media outlets refused to show the full video, sometimes describing it or showing images immediately preceding al-Kasasbeh's immolation. Fox News posted the complete video on its website.

The Jordanian government assessed that al-Kasasbeh was killed by burning on 3 January, rather than 3 February, when the video was released on Twitter. If correct, it would confirm that the ISIS never intended to exchange him for al-Rishawi. Other news reports suggest that he may have been killed a few days later, on 8 January, according to a tweet posted by a Syrian activist from Raqqa that day claiming he saw individuals from ISIS celebrating the death of al-Kasasbeh on 8 January. It was reported that al-Kasasbeh was deprived of food beginning five days before he was killed.

=== Jordanian response ===
==== Executions ====
The terrorists whose release ISIL had demanded in exchange for al-Kasasbeh, Sajida al-Rishawi and Ziad al-Karbouly, were executed on 4 February.

==== Airstrikes ====
That same day, 4 February, Jordan began airstrikes on ISIL positions in Iraq and commenced strikes against ISIL in Syria the day after. King Abdullah paid a condolence call to the pilot's family as the first bombing run in Syria hit its targets. The lower house of Parliament voted to support the war effort.

The three-day air campaign, dubbed "Operation Martyr Muath", hit over 56 targets in and around Raqqa, Syria, which ISIL claimed as its capital. Jordan claimed to have destroyed 20% of ISIL's "military capabilities" with the strikes, and independent media sources reported that the operation killed 56 ISIL members, including a senior commander.

Though this three-day air campaign accounted for the bulk of Jordan's strikes in Syria, Jordan has continued flying missions against ISIL. By the end of 2015, Jordanian Air Force fighters had flown 1,100 hours of daily missions against ISIL, with most strikes concentrated in and around Raqqa and Deir ez-Zour. Jordanian airstrikes have continued through 2017, with February 2017 strikes hitting ISIL positions in southern Syria.

== Hosting activities of foreign militaries ==
Much of Jordan's involvement in the Syrian war consists of enabling the interventions of other countries by hosting foreign military personnel. Several countries fly combat missions against ISIL from bases in Jordan. Six Belgian F-16s conduct strikes in Syria from Jordan. Dutch, American, and Bahraini F-16s are based at the Muwaffaq Salti Air Base in Zarqa Governorate. The base is also reported to host several American MQ-9 Reaper drones, based on commercial satellite imagery from 2016. Other bases host French Dassault Mirage 2000 fighters. Jordan is also home to a command center for coordinating Western and Arab support for Syrian rebel groups. This command center, known as the Military Operations Center (MOC), provides training, tactical advice, and directions to rebels, in additional to directing material support—weapons, vehicles, and cash—to select rebel groups. Finally, Jordan hosts training grounds for Iraqi and Syrian forces.

== Support for Syrian rebels ==
Jordanian intelligence provided support to anti-Assad rebel groups operating in Deraa Governorate, southern Syria. Through a command center in a building of its intelligence headquarters in Amman, Jordan oversaw Western and Arab efforts to funnel weapons, money, and vehicles to the Southern Front of the Free Syrian Army. This command center, known as the Military Operations Center (MOC), also provides training and tactical advice to the Southern Front. Jordan directed most major offensives by Southern Front affiliated groups from the opening of the Amman command center in late 2013 through autumn 2015, and its influence was felt in particular in the April 2015 Battle of Nasib Border Crossing.

However, following the Russian intervention in Syria in September 2015, Jordan began to withdraw its support for the Southern Front. When Russia entered the conflict, Russia and Jordan "agreed to coordinate military operations in Syria", according to a statement from Russian Foreign Minister Sergey Lavrov. This entailed Jordan and Russia securing an informal truce in Daraa. Following a series of terrorist attacks in Jordan in 2016—in Karak, al-Jafr, and al-Rukban camp—Jordan sealed its border with Syria, depriving the Southern Front of arms and other support. The withdrawal of support precipitated infighting between the Southern Front's 58 constituent groups, with Jaysh al-Islam and MOC-backed al-Rahman Legion clashing in Eastern Ghouta.

As of January 2017, Jordan continued to provide assistance to select groups within the Southern Front. This assistance was no longer aimed at activities fighting the Syrian government and instead has the much more limited mandate of providing stability and defeating jihadi groups.

== Rumors of a ground invasion ==
Since February 2015, rumors have periodically circulated that Jordan would invade Syria or Iraq, to attack either ISIL-controlled territory or the Assad regime. As of June 2018, none of these rumors have been substantiated. In February 2015, media reports announced that "thousands of troops" had been sent to the Jordan-Iraq border. Simultaneously, Khaled al-Obaidi, the Iraqi Defense Minister, announced that "The king of Jordan has requested that all means of the Jordanian armed forces be made available to the Iraqi army." Though Jordan continued airstrikes against ISIL, it did not deploy ground troops. In June 2015, rumors again circulated that Jordan and Turkey would launch a coordinated attack on Syria and create buffer zones near their respective borders. Though Turkey did eventually invade and occupy part of northern Syria, in Operation Euphrates Shield in August 2016, Jordan did not deploy troops to southern Syria. In April 2017, Syrian President Bashar al-Assad accused Jordan of planning to invade, saying that Jordan “had been always part of the American plan” against Syria. Once again, no invasion materialized.

== Domestic response ==
Prior to the immolation of Al-Kasasbeh, public opinion regarding Jordan's participation in the U.S.-led intervention in Syria was mixed. In September 2014, for example, only 62% of Jordanians considered ISIL a terrorist organization, and prominent Islamist and liberal Jordanian organizations made public statements against Jordanian participation in the coalition. Al-Kasasbeh's murder prompted widespread calls for revenge against ISIL, which was reflected in polling data: a February 2015 poll found that 86% percent of Jordanians supported Jordan's strikes against ISIL and 95% considered the organization a terrorist group. Public support for the campaign against ISIL has proved persistent: an April 2016 poll conducted by the International Republican Institute found that 71% of Jordanians supported their country's intervention against ISIL.

The mayor of Ma'an, a southern Jordanian city known for its often critical stance toward Jordan's national policies, interviewed by Die Zeit, said: "with all due respect for His Majesty (King Abdullah II), but we are never asked anything when such wars are under consideration."

== International reaction ==
While the Assad government indicated that it would allow Jordan to bomb ISIL, it warned that ground troops were out of the question. "We will not allow anyone to violate our national sovereignty and we do not need any ground troops to fight Daesh," Syrian foreign Minister Walid al-Moallem said.

The NGOs Human Rights Watch and Amnesty International denounced Jordan's executions of the terrorists and called for an end to hostilities.

== Airstrikes against drugs smuggling ==
On 8 May 2023, Jordan conducted two airstrikes on southern Syria, in which they managed to kill Marie al-Ramthan, who was sentenced to death on several occasions in absentia for Captagon trafficking, and his family including his wife and six children by targeting his house in Shaab, As-Suwayda. The other airstrike destroyed a drugs factory linked to the Iran-backed Lebanese militia Hezbollah at Kharab al Shahem, Daraa Governorate.

Later that year, on 18 December, the Royal Jordanian Air Force conducted airstrikes in the Salkhad District, resulting in the elimination of a notorious drug dealer. Concurrently, clashes erupted at al-Hadlat crossing area involving confrontations with numerous pro-Iranian militants attempting to infiltrate the border. These militants were found carrying rocket launchers, anti-personnel mines, and explosives, leading to casualties, including the loss of a Jordanian soldier and several smugglers.

On 18 January 2024, the Jordanian air force carried out airstrikes on the towns of Malah and Urman, killing ten people, including two children.

== See also ==
- Timber Sycamore
- 2015 Amman shooting attack
- King Faisal Air Base shooting
