= 2016 Karak attack =

Shootings in Al-Karak, Jordan

2016 Al-Karak attack
- Part of Jordanian-Syrian border conflict
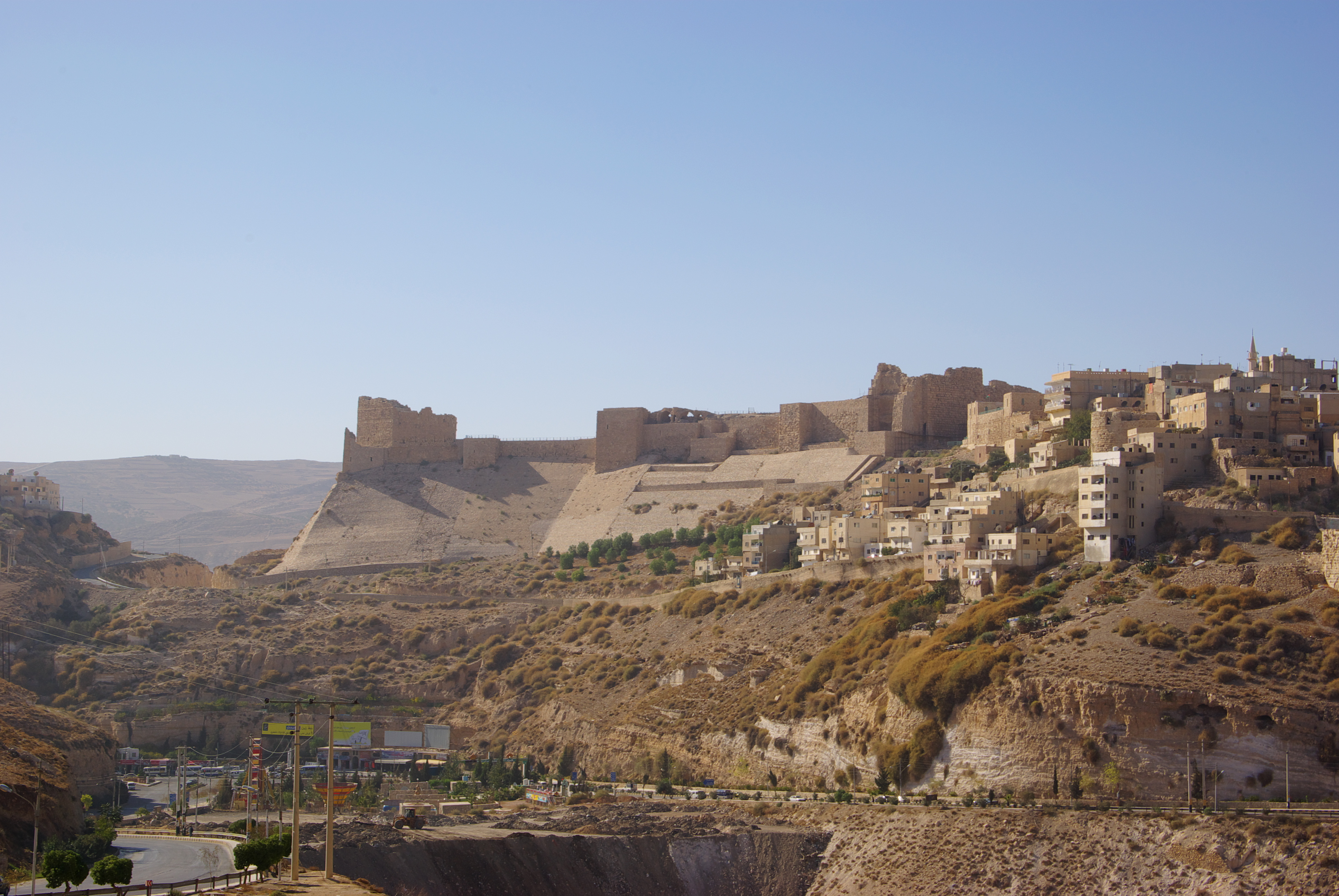
- The Kerak Castle, where the main phase of the attack took place.
- Location: Al-Karak, Jordan
- Date: 18–21 December 2016 c. 15:00 (AST)
- Target: Security forces, civilians
- Attack type: Shootings
- Deaths: 19 killed (including 5 attackers)
- Injuries: 37
- Perpetrator: ISIS

On 18 December 2016, a series of shootings took place in the city of Al-Karak in southern Jordan. The attack started in the vicinity of Al-Karak where a group of unidentified militants ambushed emergency responders and then moved into the city, attacking police patrols and the local police station and finally seeking shelter in the historic Crusader-era Kerak Castle, a popular tourist attraction.

Severe fog at noon hampered police operations. After an attempt by the Jordanian gendarmerie to besiege the castle, the five attackers were killed following the arrival of the elite Jordanian 71st Special Battalion. Although tourists were present, Jordanian authorities stated that there was no hostage situation; tourists were in a different part of the castle and were unable to leave.

Around a third of the casualties were for Jordanian security forces. The Islamic State claimed responsibility for the attack against the "apostate Jordanian security forces". Terror attacks are rare in Jordan; the country is designated as safe and holds 58th out of 130 in the 2016 Global Terrorism Index.

== Background ==
Jordan is a leading member of the US-led coalition fighting against the Islamic State of Iraq and the Levant group in neighbouring Iraq and Syria. It has carried out air strikes targeting ISIL fighters and hosts coalition troops on its territory. The terrorist group has threatened the country a number of times for its attacks against ISIL, proclaimed King Abdullah II an infidel, and declared their intentions to slaughter him. Muath Al-Kasasbeh, a Jordanian fighter pilot who was born in Al-Karak, was captured by the Islamic State group when his plane went down in Syria in December 2014, and was later burned alive in a cage. In retaliation to the murder of Al-Kasasbeh, Jordanian authorities expedited the execution of convicted terrorists Sajida Mubarak Atrous al-Rishawi and Ziad Khalaf Raja al-Karbouly by hanging in Swaqa Prison in February 2015.

== Attack ==
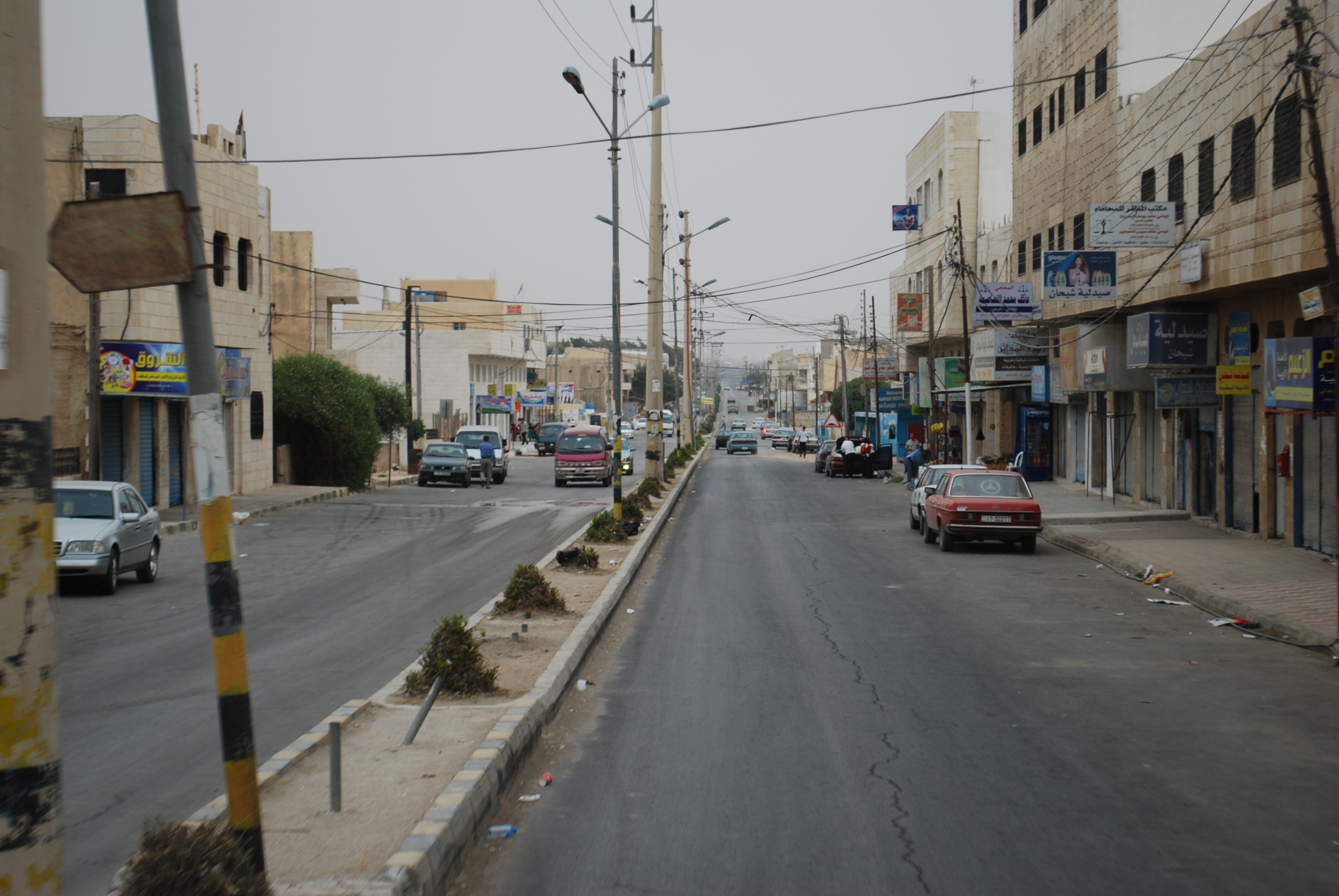
A street in Al-Karak (2010)

On 18 December 2016, a series of shootings took place in the city of Al-Karak in southern Jordan. The attack started c. 15:00 (AST) in the vicinity of Al-Karak where a group of unidentified militants ambushed emergency responders who were dispatched to a false fire call, before moving into Al-Karak. The militants then attacked the local tourism police station before seeking shelter in the medieval castle just across the street, a popular tourist attraction. The castle was later besieged by Jordanian Gendarmerie forces, who believed a number of tourists were being held hostage inside. Reinforcements from Amman included the 71st Special Battalion, who killed four terrorists and ended the attack by midnight. Jordanian authorities stated that there was no hostage situation, but that tourists were in a different part of the castle and were unable to leave. Following the standoff between the security forces and the gunmen, many other tourists who were trapped during the shootout decided to hide in the castle. Jordanian Interior Minister Salameh Hammad also told reporters that the attackers were not aware of the presence of the tourists, thus concluding that the tourists were not hostages but instead were hiding from the gunmen to cover themselves from the shootout.

During the attack, videos posted on social media showed Jordanian civilians, including young people and tribal leaders, taking arms and joining the security forces trying to locate the attackers.

=== Casualties ===
Eleven Jordanian security forces, two Jordanian civilians, and a Canadian tourist were killed during the attacks, while 34 Jordanians, two Malaysians, and one Canadian were injured. Four police were later killed in a manhunt, and five attackers were killed in total. A man was also arrested.

Casualties by nationality
Country	Deaths	Injured
Jordan	13	34
Canada	1	1
Malaysia	0	2
Total	14	37

Jordanian casualties
Status	Deaths	Injured
Public Security Directorate	6	11
General Directorate of Gendarmerie	3	4
71st Special Battalion	2	2
Civilians	2	17
Total	13	34

== Aftermath ==
A number of manhunts were initiated across the kingdom in pursuit of suspected members of the terror cell. King Abdullah paid a visit to the wounded at the King Hussein Medical Center.

A report by (majority government-owned) The Jordan Times published in the day following the attack published interviews with tourists who visited the country the day of the attack. Interviewed tourists were quoted saying they were happy to be in Jordan despite the attack.

However, experts warned of a potential slump in tourism, which Jordan's economy depends largely on. Figures from the World Travel & Tourism Council show that tourism indirectly accounted for 20.7% of the GDP, and around 288,500 jobs in 2015. Any slump would exacerbate unemployment and poverty in the country. Despite Jordan being designated as safe and holding 58th out of 130 countries in the Global Terrorism Index in 2016, which measures impact of terrorism on countries, Jordan's tourism industry witnessed a downfall trend since 2011 due to regional instability. Furthermore, the Jordanian economy is already struggling with the effects of the flow of 1.4 million Syrian refugees since 2011.

On 22 December, Karak's Tourism Director announced that tourist activities had returned to normal in the city.

47 out of 130 representatives of the Jordanian Parliament presented a motion of no confidence against Salameh Hammad, the Minister of Interior. The MPs accused Hammad of inadequately handling the attack; the motion was supposed to be discussed on 13 January. The motion was not discussed, as the Minister was replaced by Ghaleb Zu'bi in a government reshuffle on 15 January.

Although political analysts acknowledged that Jordan faces greater security risks, they downplayed any effect of this incident on the country's long-term stability.

The Financial Tribune reported on 18 January 2017 that the Jordanian tourism sector remained stable and that the Al-Karak attack did not affect tourist arrivals.

The Jordan Times reported on 13 March 2017 that tourist arrivals to Jordan almost doubled during the first two months of 2017, a change from the downward trend of the past few years.

15 European Union ambassadors visited the castle on 16 March 2017 in a show of solidarity. Andrea Fontana, the EU ambassador to Jordan, called on European nationals to visit Al-Karak saying that "this visit of solidarity with Karak residents shows that Jordan is a safe country".

== Reactions ==
=== International ===
- United States – Spokesperson of the State Department, John Kirby said, "We offer our deepest condolences to all the victims and their families, and recognise the bravery of the Jordanian security personnel who died protecting their fellow citizens. We extend our hope for a full and speedy recovery to all the wounded." "The United States remains steadfast in our commitments to Jordan, one of our closest allies and partners. Such attacks only reinforce our collective resolve to create a more secure and stable region and world", he added.
- Bahrain – The government of Bahrain expressed its support to Jordan and stressed the need for an international effort to eradicate terrorism.
- Canada – Canadian Ministry of Foreign Affairs spokesman, John Babcock, expressed his government's deepest condolences over the terrorist attack's victims and to the friends and family of the Canadian citizen, who was killed in the incident.
- Israel – Prime Minister Benjamin Netanyahu condemned the terrorist attack by saying, "On behalf of the people and government of Israel, I strongly condemn yesterday's terrorist attack in Jordan," he says. "We send our sympathies to the families of the victims and wish the wounded a speedy and full recovery," he added.
- Kuwait – Emir Sabah Al-Ahmad Al-Jaber Al-Sabah sent his condolences to King Abdullah II and expressed his country's grief and condemnation to the attack.
- Palestine – The Palestinian National Reconciliation Government expressed its solidarity with Jordan and said what happened in the southern city of Karak constitutes a heinous crime that represents the forces of evil and darkness' mentality.
- Saudi Arabia – Deputy Crown Prince Mohammad bin Salman Al Saud sent a cable of condolences to Jordan's King Abdullah II following the news of the terrorist act. According to Saudi Press Agency, he expressed sadness for the news and the resulting casualties, condemned this criminal act and wished the injured speedy recovery.
- United Arab Emirates – UAE Ministry of Foreign Affairs and International Cooperation statement underlined the UAE firm position in rejecting terrorism in all its forms and manifestations, calling for strengthening teamwork, consolidating international cooperation and collaborating all efforts directed to eliminate terrorist organizations that threaten the security and stability of the world.

=== Local ===
King Abdullah II during a meeting at the National Center for Security and Crisis Management with the government stated "we will respond firmly to all those who threaten or attempt to tamper with the security of our country".

Church leaders in governorates across Jordan called for cancelling public Christmas celebrations, to express solidarity with the victims of the attack. Church bells rang in the cities of Fuheis and Karak, mourning the victims of the attack.

On 16 March 2017, NGO Rebuild for Peace teamed up with residents of the Karak area to repair the damage done to the castle. At the event, people also made commemorative and symbolic gestures to the victims and their families.

== See also ==
- 2005 Amman bombings
- List of terrorist incidents in December 2016
