= 71st Special Battalion =

71st Special Battalion (Jordan) / Special Unit II
- الكتيبة الخاصة 71 (الأردن) / الوحدة الخاصة 2
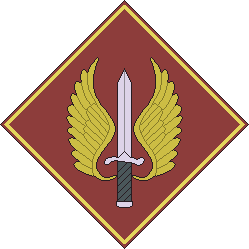
- Emblem of the 71st Special Battalion
- Active: 1973 – present
- Country: Jordan
- Branch: Jordanian Armed Forces
- Type: Special forces
- Size: Battalion

Commanders
- Current commander: unknown

71st Special Battalion or 71st Counter Terrorism Battalion or as known today Special Unit II is a Jordanian Special Forces battalion that specializes in combating terrorism.

== Operations ==
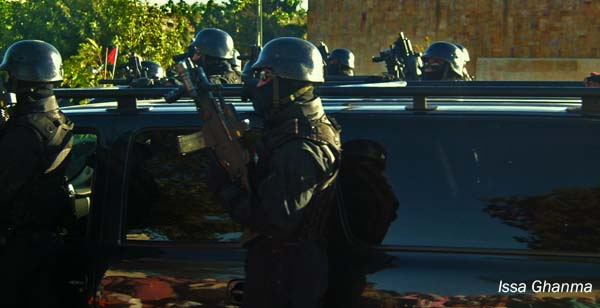
71st Special Battalion members during a demonstration at Special Operations Forces Exhibition.

The battalion is thought to have participated in several operations.

In 1977, they participated in ending a hotel siege in Amman.

In 2006, following 2005 Amman Bombings, the battalion collaborated with the Jordanian intelligence agents in several operations which included the capture of Ziad Khalaf Raja al-Karbouly in Iraq.

In 2013, Crown Prince Hussein participated in a training session with the 71st battalion members.

On 22 June 2014, responding to the threat of ISIS which captured the Iraqi city of Ar Rutba not far from the Jordanian border, the unit was dispatched to the area.

On 1 March 2016, the unit clashed with extremist militias in the city of Irbid in northern Jordan as part of the General Intelligence Directorate attempt to foil a terrorist plot against military and civilian targets in Jordan by ISIS affiliates.

The battalion was dispatched to the Kerak Castle, during the events of the 2016 Al-Karak attack.
