= Pagan (name) =

Pagan, also Paganus, Pain or Payn, is a historical masculine given name in use in Europe the Middle Ages. Other forms include French Payen, Païen or Péan, and Italian Pagano.

- Pagan I, lord of Haifa in 1107–1112
- Pagan the Chancellor (d. bef. 1129), crusader administrator
- Pain fitzJohn (d. 1137), Anglo-Norman administrator
- Pagan the Butler (d. 1149), crusader baron
- Payn, sheriff of Cambridgeshire and Huntingdonshire in 1155–1161
- Payn de Beauchamp (d. c. 1157), husband of Rohese de Vere, Countess of Essex
- Payn de Rochefort, seneschal of Anjou in 1190
- Pagan II, lord of Haifa in 1190s
- Pagano della Torre (d. 1365), Italian prelate

== See also ==
- Pagan of Bulgaria (d. 768), an unrelated name
- Pagan Kennedy (born 1963), zine author
