= Operation Martyr Muath =

Jordanian operation against the Islamic State

- Part of Jordanian intervention in the Syrian civil war
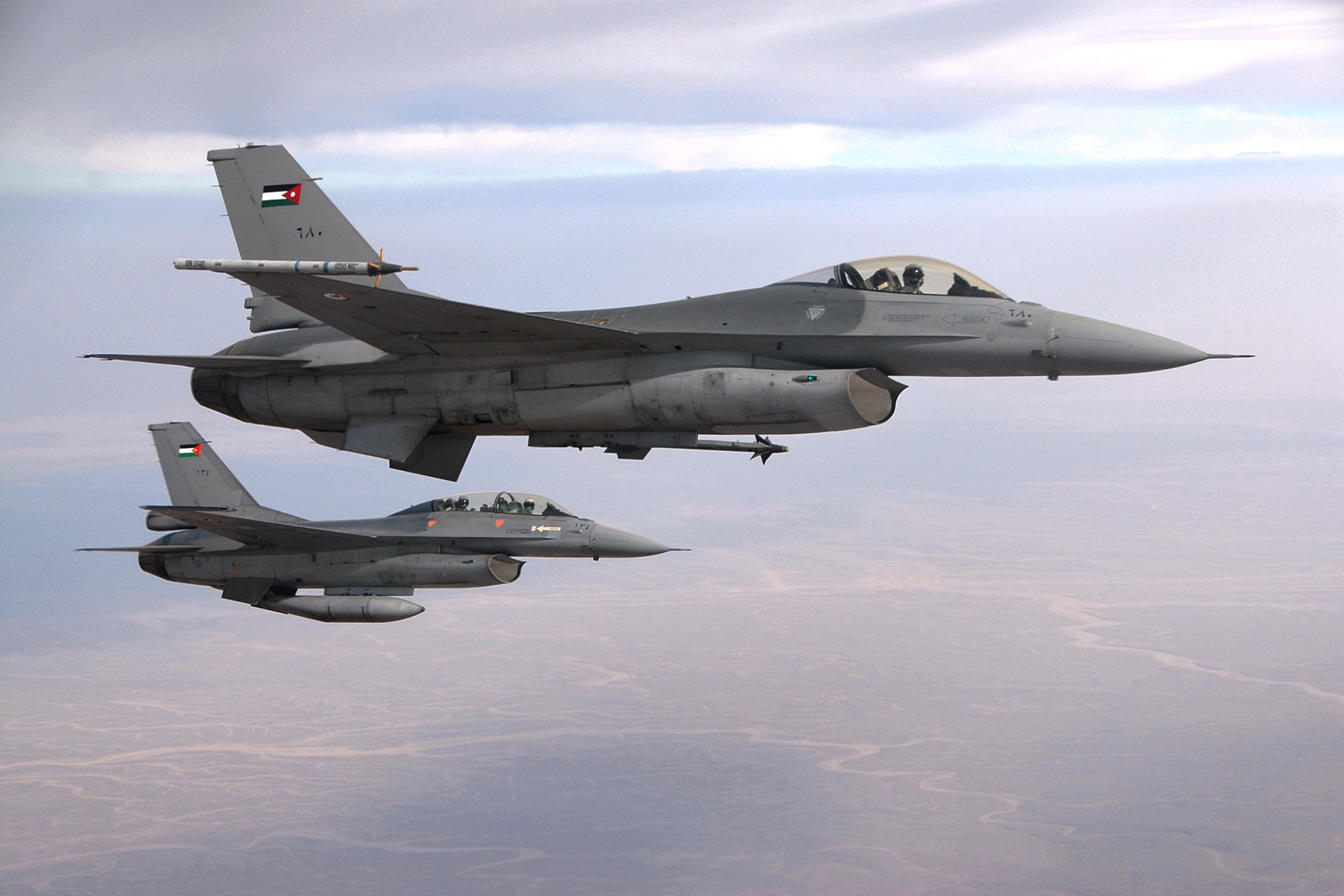
- Two F-16 of the Royal Jordanian Air Force
Date	2 – 5 February 2015 (3 days)
Location	Raqqa, Syria
Result	Jordanian victory

Belligerents
Jordan	Islamic State

Commanders and leaders
(Jordan) King Abdullah II	(Islamic State) Abu Bakr al-Baghdadi

Strength
30 F-16 fighter jets	3,000-5,000 Militants

Casualties and losses
None	56 ISIS militants killed and 56 targets destroyed

Operation Martyr Muath (Arabic: عملية الشهيد معاذ) was a 3-day series of airstrikes by the Royal Jordanian Air Force on Islamic State targets in response to the execution of the pilot Muath Al-Kasasbeh, who was burned alive.

== Capture of Muath ==
Pilot Muath al-Kasasbeh of the Royal Jordanian Air Force was captured on 24 December 2014 after his F-16 jet crashed over ISIS-held territory during a mission. The Jordanian government spent the next three months negotiating the pilot's release in exchange for some ISIS and Al-Qaeda prisoners from Jordanian prisons. On 2 February 2015, a 22-minute video was released by ISIS showed the pilot being interrogated and then burned alive in a cage. However, it is believed that the pilot was executed on 3 January and that ISIS was thus negotiating under false pretence for an entire month.

== Casualties ==
Jordan's three-day aerial bombardment of ISIS-held territory in Syria targeted ISIS training camps, ammunition depots and oil extraction facilities, which inflicted 56 casualties among ISIS fighters, including a high-ranking official known as the "Prince of Nineveh". Jordanian state TV released footage showing fighter jets leaving Muwaffaq Salti Air Base in Azraq, with the video entitled, "this is the beginning and you will get to know the Jordanians".

== Aftermath ==
Jordanian F-16s returning from the bombing campaign made a diversion in Al-Karak, over the place where King Abdullah II and large crowds gathered to offer condolences to Muath's family.

ISIS falsely claimed that Jordanian airstrikes had killed female American hostage Kayla Mueller, a claim that was debunked by Jordanian and American government officials.
