= Pagan the Butler =

French crusader noble (died c. 1149)

Pagan the Butler (Latin: Paganus Pincerna, French: Payen le Bouteiller; died around 1149) was lord of Transjordan in the Kingdom of Jerusalem from around 1126. He was first mentioned as the butler of Baldwin II of Jerusalem in 1120. He ordered the erection of Kerak Castle which became his seat in 1142.

The name Pagan derives from the Latin word paganus, which originally meant "country dweller". During the Roman Empire, Christianity became the state religion and was most popular in urban and military spaces, and so as a result it is likely that paganus came to also refer to those who adhered to traditional religions and were seen as "civilians" rather than committed to Christ. As a given or surname, Pagan was relatively rare but used in medieval Europe, especially France.

== Career ==
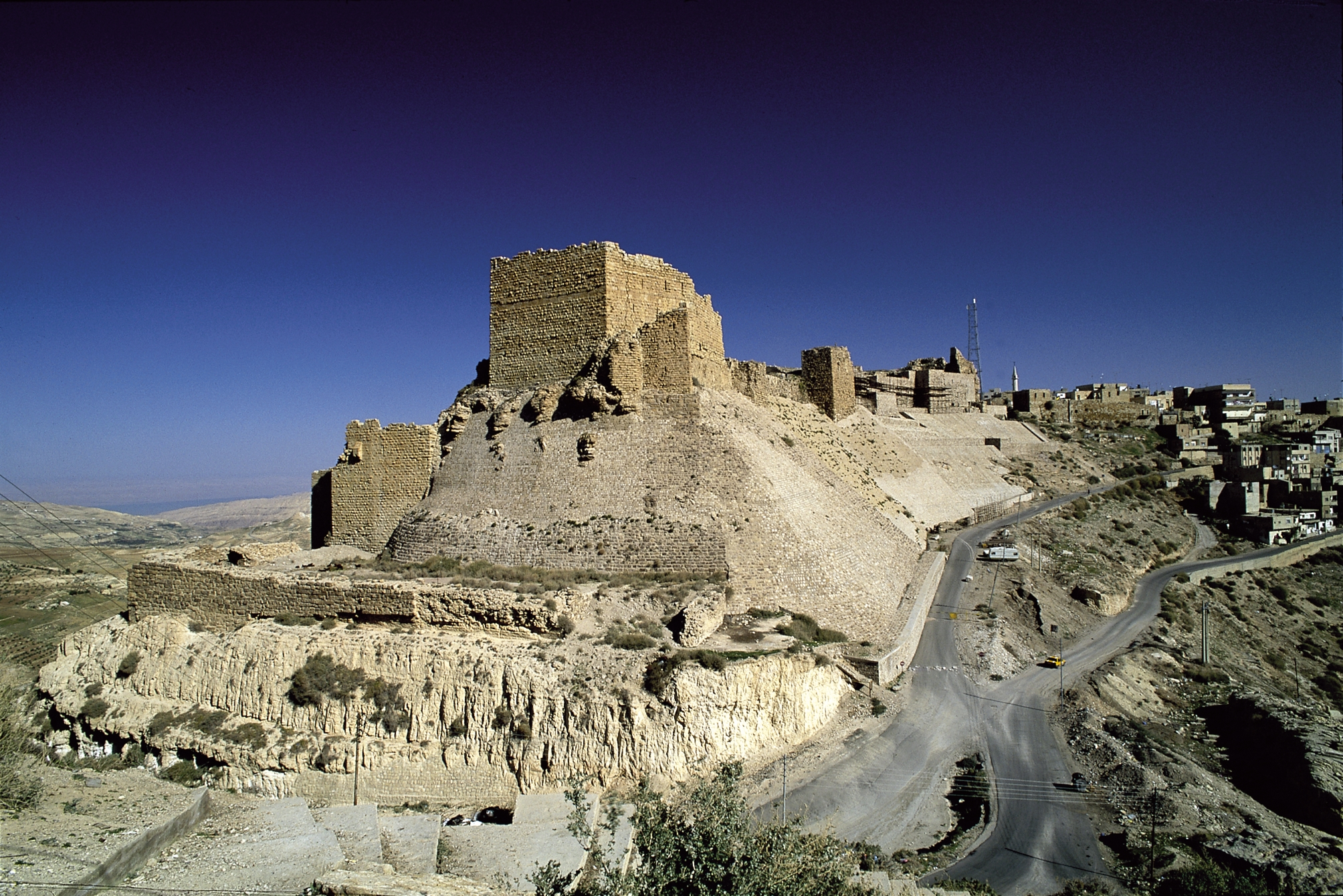
Kerak Castle in 2008 (at present-day Al-Karak in Jordan)

Pagan was an influential retainer of Baldwin II of Jerusalem. According to Lindsay L. Brook, he was likely the brother of Stephanie, wife of Guy of Milly and later Baldwin I of Ramla. This would make Pagan the uncle of both Philip of Milly, a Grand Master of the Knights Templar, as supported by the late 13th-century Lignages d'Outremer, and Barisan, first lord of Ibelin. However, Philip married a noblewoman, Isabella, and Steven Runciman writes that she was a niece of Pagan the Butler, so the lineages are not certain. The Lignages d'Outremer claims that Stephanie, and therefore Pagan, came from a noble Flemish family, though Brooks states this social rank is not possible.

When Baldwin II was crowned in 1118, he reorganised the royal court and appointed his faithful supporters to the highest offices. Pagan was first mentioned as the king's butler in 1120. Hans Eberhard Mayer argues that Pagan the Butler (who was mentioned in 1120) and Pagan of Montreal (mentioned in 1126) were not identical, but other historians have not accepted Mayer's view. Pagan replaced Roman of Le Puy as lord of Transjordan by 1126. According to a royal charter which was issued in 1161, Pagan was the first lord of Transjordan, which implies that Roman had not ruled the whole territory of the lordship.

Initially, Pagan had his seat in the castle of Montréal. After he could not prevent a band of Syrian soldiers from making a raid across the Jordan River, he decided to build a new fortress at a triangular plateau at the Wadi al-Karak which was located closer to the Dead Sea and Jerusalem. He transferred his seat to the newly built Kerak Castle in 1142. Pagan died in the late 1140s. He was succeeded by his nephew Maurice.

== Sources ==
- Barber, Malcolm (1994). The New Knighthood: A History of the Order of the Temple. Cambridge University Press. ISBN 978-1-107-60473-5.
- Barber, Malcolm (2012). The Crusader States. Yale University Press. ISBN 978-0-300-11312-9.
- Brook, Lindsay L. (July 2003). "Notes and Queries (No. 5): Stephanie of Flanders, ancestress of the Ibelins" (PDF). Foundation for Medieval GenealogyFoundation for Medieval Genealogy. 1 (2).
- Kennedy, Hugh (1994). Crusader Castles. Cambridge University Press. ISBN 978-0-521-79913-3.
- Milwright, Marcus (2008). The Fortress of the Raven: Karak in the Middle Islamic Period (1100–1650). BRILL. ISBN 978-90-04-16519-9.
- Murray, Alan V. (2000). The Crusader Kingdom of Jerusalem: A Dynastic History, 1099–1125. Prosopographica et Geneologica. ISBN 978-1-9009-3403-9.
- O'Donnell, James (1977). "Paganus". Classical Folia. 31: 163–69.
- Runciman, Steven (1989). A History of the Crusades, Volume II: The Kingdom of Jerusalem and the Frankish East, 1100-1187. Cambridge University Press. ISBN 0-521-06163-6.
- Runciman, Steven (1999). A History of the Crusades. Vol. II: The Kingdom of Jerusalem and the Frankish East, 1100-1187. Cambridge University Press.

Pagan the Butler Died: c. 1149
Preceded by Roman of Le Puy	Lord of Transjordan c. 1126–c. 1149	Succeeded by Maurice
