= Muath al-Kasasbeh =

Jordanian pilot murdered by ISIL in 2015

- معاذ صافي يوسف الكساسبة
- Born: Muath Safi Yousef al-Kasasbeh; 29 May 1988; Karak, Jordan
- Died: c. 3 January 2015 (aged 26); Raqqa, Syria
- Cause of death: Burning
- Burial place: Syria
- Spouse: Anwar al-Tarawneh (m. 2014)
- Military career
- Allegiance: Jordan
- Branch: Royal Jordanian Air Force
- Years of service: 2009–2015
- Rank: Captain (promoted posthumously)
- Unit: No. 1 Squadron
- Conflicts: Syrian civil war; Jordanian intervention (executed)

Muath Safi Yousef al-Kasasbeh (Arabic: معاذ صافي يوسف الكساسبة, romanized: Muʿadh Ṣāfī Yūsuf al-Kasāsibah, Levantine Arabic: [mʊˈʕaːð ˈsˤɑːfi ˈjuːsef el kaˈsaːzbe, mʊˈʕaːz -]; 29 May 1988 – c. 3 January 2015) was a Jordanian fighter pilot who was captured and burned to death by the Islamic State militant group after his F-16 fighter aircraft crashed over Syria.

Al-Kasasbeh's fighter jet crashed near Raqqa, Syria, on 24 December 2014 during the military intervention against the Islamic State. United States and Jordanian officials said that mechanical problems caused the crash, while ISIL claimed that a heat-seeking missile hit the plane.

ISIL held al-Kasasbeh captive before killing him in early January 2015. Afterwards ISIL conducted negotiations with the Jordanian government, claiming it would spare al-Kasabeh's life and free Japanese journalist Kenji Goto in exchange for Sajida al-Rishawi, a woman sentenced to death by Jordan for attempted terrorism and possessing explosives. After the Jordanian government insisted on freeing al-Kasasbeh as part of the deal and seeking proof that he was alive before it would exchange al-Rishawi, ISIL released a video on 3 February 2015 showing al-Kasasbeh being burned to death while trapped inside a cage.

Al-Kasasbeh's killing provoked widespread outrage in Jordan and condemnation by leading figures of the Islamic world. In direct retaliation, King Abdullah ordered the executions of condemned terrorists Sajida al-Rishawi and Ziad Al-Karbouly, though they had been in the process of appealing their sentences, as well as Operation Martyr Muath, a series of airstrikes that killed several ISIL militants over three days.

== Personal life ==
Muath (often called "Moaz" in English language media) Safi Yousef al-Kasasbeh was one of eight children, including an elder brother, Jawdat Safi al-Kasasbeh, born to Issaf and Safi Yousef al-Kasasbeh, a former professor, in Karak, Jordan. He was a Sunni Muslim. The al-Kasasbehs are a prominent Jordanian family of the influential Sunni Muslim Bararsheh tribe from southern Jordan. His uncle, Fahed al-Kasasbeh, was a Major General in the Royal Jordanian Army.

Al-Kasasbeh married engineer Anwar al-Tarawneh in September 2014. Before his capture, al-Kasasbeh lived in the village of Ay in the Karak Mountains in Karak Governorate, 90 miles (140 km) south of Amman.

== Career ==
In 2009, al-Kasasbeh graduated from the King Hussein Air College and joined the Royal Jordanian Air Force. He completed his F-16 training in the Royal Jordanian Air Force, and by 2012, had qualified as an operational F-16 pilot and was assigned to No. 1 Squadron at Muwaffaq Salti Air Base.

At the time of his capture, al-Kasasbeh was a first lieutenant. He was posthumously promoted to the rank of captain.

== Capture ==
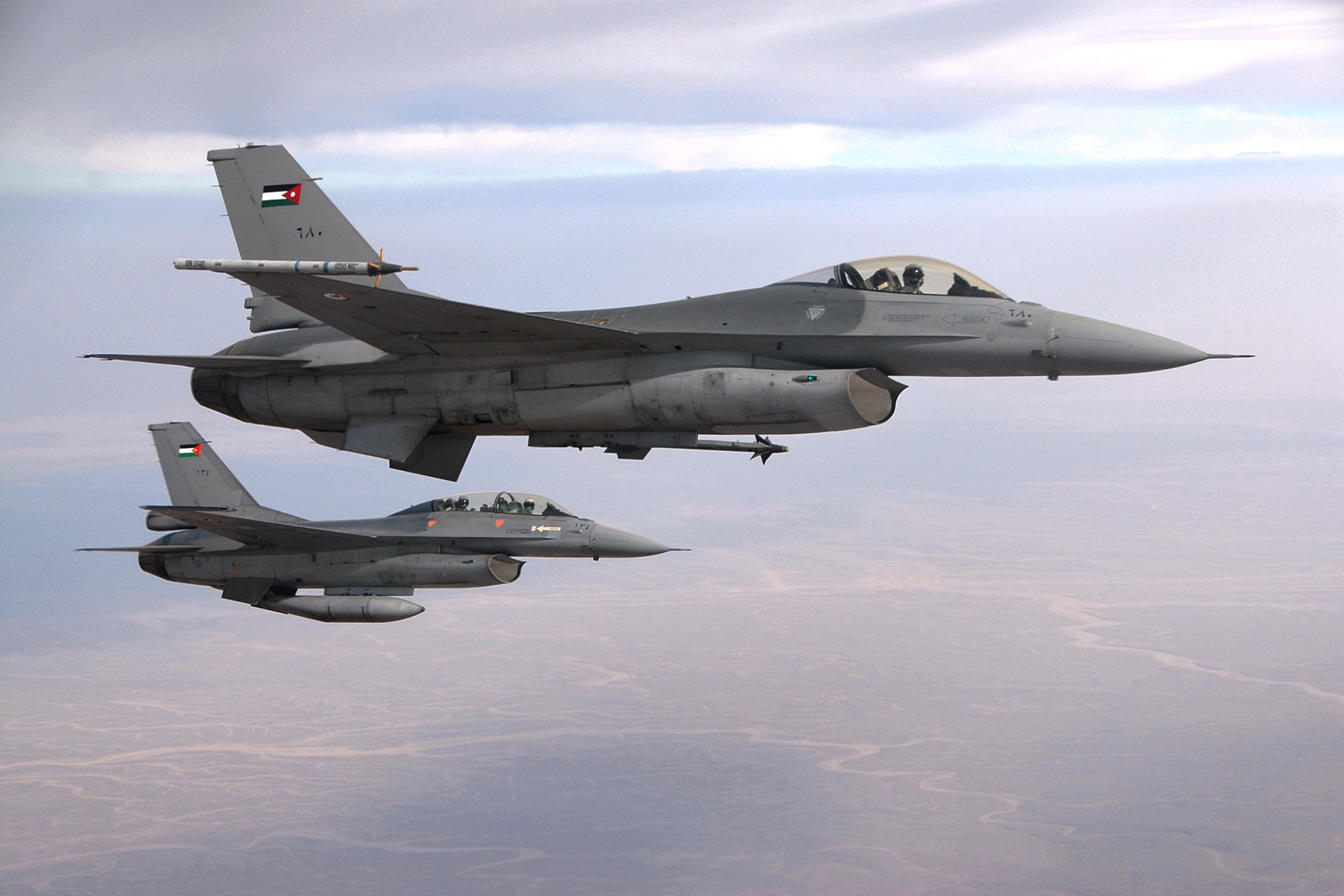
A pair of Jordanian F-16s, similar to those operated by al-Kasasbeh, in October 2009

The plane al-Kasasbeh was piloting, a Lockheed Martin F-16 formerly used by the Royal Belgian Air Force, crashed after suffering from mechanical problems on 24 December 2014 during a bombing raid on a brick factory during the military intervention against the Islamic State. The Jordanian government said a technical failure caused him to eject after flying at low altitude, but the Islamic State claimed it shot down his aircraft. He ejected and parachuted into a lake near Raqqa, Syria. He was quickly captured by Islamic State militants and pulled from the water. US officials state they initiated a search and rescue mission, but they did not locate him before he was captured. On 30 December 2014, al-Kasasbeh appeared in a detailed interview with ISIL's Dabiq magazine.

Unsuccessful negotiations took place for his release. His family applied pressure on the Jordanian government to arrange for his release. Initially, it was proposed to trade him and a kidnapped Japanese journalist, Kenji Goto, for Sajida al-Rishawi, a failed Iraqi suicide bomber incarcerated in Jordan since she took part in the 2005 Amman hotel bombings and sentenced to death. The Jordanian government insisted on proof that al-Kasasbeh was still alive before proceeding with a swap. ISIL refused and published the video of his killing.

A military operation to free al-Kasasbeh, possibly by Jordanian special forces, may have been made on 1 January 2015. Members of an anti-ISIL group in Raqqa, named Raqqa Is Being Slaughtered Silently, said they witnessed coalition jets bombing targets in Raqqa in some of the fiercest strikes of the anti-ISIL campaign. At the same time, four helicopters dropped off soldiers wearing purported Jordanian Army uniforms. The mission was aborted when ISIL fighters in the area began firing anti-aircraft missiles at the helicopters, forcing a retreat.

== Death ==
ISIL supporters used the Arabic hashtag #SuggestAWayToKillTheJordanianPilotPig on Twitter, crowdsourcing and publicizing their execution of al-Kasasbeh. A film released by the group showed al-Kasasbeh was burned to death by ISIL members in January 2015. His killing was recorded on video and shown near the end of a 22-minute "snuff film" entitled Healing the Believers' Chests, credited to the ISIL official Al Furqan Media Foundation and distributed via a Twitter account known as a source for ISIL propaganda and on video-sharing sites.

The video shows him with a black left eye, first at a table and then confined in a black steel cage outdoors and dressed in an orange jumpsuit before an ISIL militant sets alight a trail doused in gasoline leading towards the cage. The video shows him burned alive while numerous armed ISIL fighters in sand-colored balaclavas and desert camouflage watch on from a distance. A wheel loader finally extinguishes the fire by dumping rocks and sand.

Before he was burned to death, al-Kasasbeh was made to reveal the names and workplaces of a number of his fellow Royal Jordanian Air Force pilots. Their names and photographs were displayed at the end of the video, with an ISIL bounty offer of 100 gold dinars (approximately $20,000) for each Jordanian Air Force pilot killed.

Most Western media outlets refused to show the full video, sometimes describing it or showing images immediately preceding al-Kasasbeh's immolation. Fox News posted the complete video on its website, which terrorism analysts criticized. Counter-terrorism expert Malcolm Nance has said that the hosting of the video was “exactly what Isis wants to propagate”.

The Jordanian government assessed that al-Kasasbeh was killed by burning on 3 January, rather than 3 February, when the video was released on Twitter. This confirmed that ISIL never intended to exchange him for al-Rishawi. Other news reports suggest that he may have been killed a few days later, on 8 January, according to a tweet posted by a Syrian activist from Raqqa that day claiming he saw individuals from ISIL celebrating the death of al-Kasasbeh on 8 January. It was reported that al-Kasasbeh was deprived of food beginning five days before he was killed.

On 25 February 2015, al-l'tisam, a media arm of ISIL, released a video entitled Message to Jordan. It showed new excerpts from the video of al-Kasasbeh's burning.

According to a former ISIS militant (Abu Mus'ab Al-Urduni) and a female Yazidi former slave (Sipan Ajo), senior ISIL leader Abu Mohammad al-Adnani personally participated in the killing of al-Kasasbeh.

In January 2025 Swedish authorities announced that Swedish-born, second-generation immigrant Osama Krayem was to be tried at a criminal court in Sweden for the killing of al-Kasasbeh. He has previously been convicted of involvement in attacks in Paris in 2015 and in Brussels in 2016, and was transferred to Sweden from France to stand trial in Stockholm. On July 31, 2025, he was convicted of serious war crimes and terrorism. He was sentenced to life imprisonment.

== Reaction ==
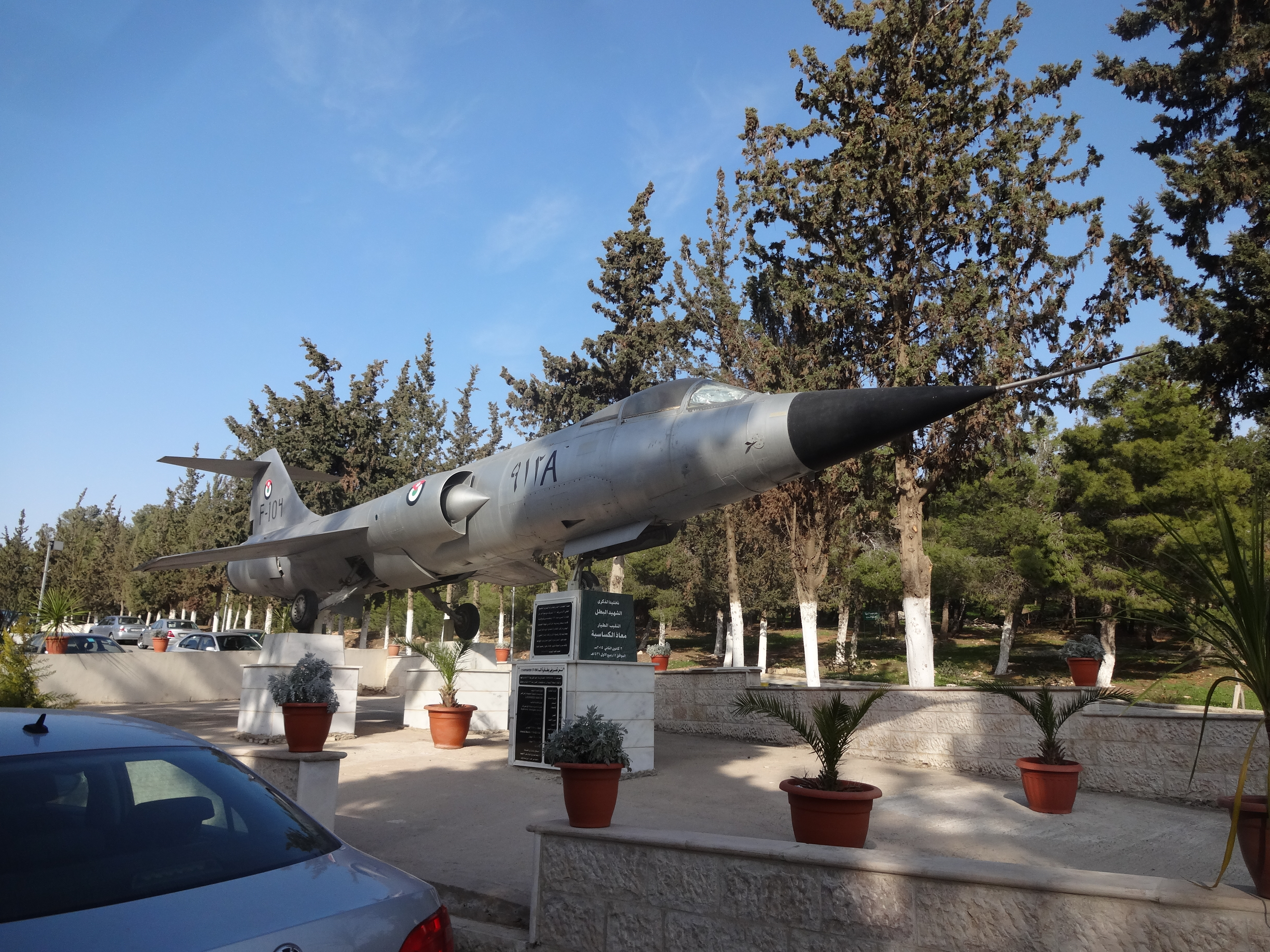
Muath al-Kasasbeh's memorial at the University of Jordan.

Al-Kasasbeh's killing provoked outrage in Jordan; even some of those who had been opposed to the country's participation in airstrikes against ISIL started demanding revenge.

King Abdullah II cut short a visit to the United States, and the Jordanian government announced that all prisoners in its custody who had been convicted of association with ISIL would be executed "within hours" in retaliation for al-Kasasbeh's killing. In further response, Mamdouh al-Ameri, a Jordanian military spokesman, said: "While the military forces mourn the martyr, they emphasize his blood will not be shed in vain. The revenge will be as big as the calamity that has hit Jordan."

On 4 February 2015, al-Rishawi and another Iraqi jihadist who was also on death row, Ziad Khalaf al-Karbouly, were executed by hanging in Swaqa Prison, expedited in response to al-Kasasbeh's death.

The coalition HQ let the Jordanian Air Forces perform most of the air strike sorties planned for that day. Later, on 4 February, Jordan launched its first military response to al-Kasasbeh's killing. Jordanian warplanes bombed ISIL positions in Mosul, killing 55 ISIL fighters, including a senior commander. The following day, Jordan launched airstrikes against ISIL weapons and ammunition warehouses and training camps. According to U.S. officials, the attacks took place near Raqqa and involved 20 Jordanian F-16s, with American refueling and radio jamming aircraft assisting. After the jets completed their mission, they overflew al-Kasasbeh's hometown of Karak while returning to base. The Jordan Radio and Television Corporation aired footage shot prior to those attacks of pilots scribbling messages onto bombs slated to be used in the strikes. "For you, the enemies of Islam," read one message. Others bore verses from the Quran. In 3 days of bombardment, Jordanian fighter jets destroyed 56 ISIL targets and killed dozens of ISIL fighters.

Several clerics, leading figures of the Islamic world, and news outlets roundly condemned the killing as murder. However, ISIL said it could be justified through Islamic law, despite cremation being illegal per Islamic law.

The Jordanian branch of the Muslim Brotherhood, the Islamic Action Front, condemned the killing of al-Kasasbeh. Their statement described it as a "crime", without mentioning ISIL. The IAF's leader, Sheikh Hammam Saïd, in a 5 February interview with Radio Sawa, asked Jordan to withdraw from the anti-ISIL coalition, saying, "Jordan should not be part of a coalition run by the United States."

Sheikh Salam Salameh, a Hamas member of the Palestinian Legislative Council (PLC), said "IS members are, in one way or another, considered Muslims and we must not stand with the enemies of Allah against the people of Allah (the IS)." He added, "Jordan is the reason for al-Kasasbeh having been burned. The Jordanian government decided to send its army into Syria to assist the [Syrian] government against the rebels in their war, in which it [Jordan] has no interest. It should have adopted a similar position to Turkey."
