= Kerak Castle =

Fortified residence in al-Karak, Jordan

- al-Karak, Jordan
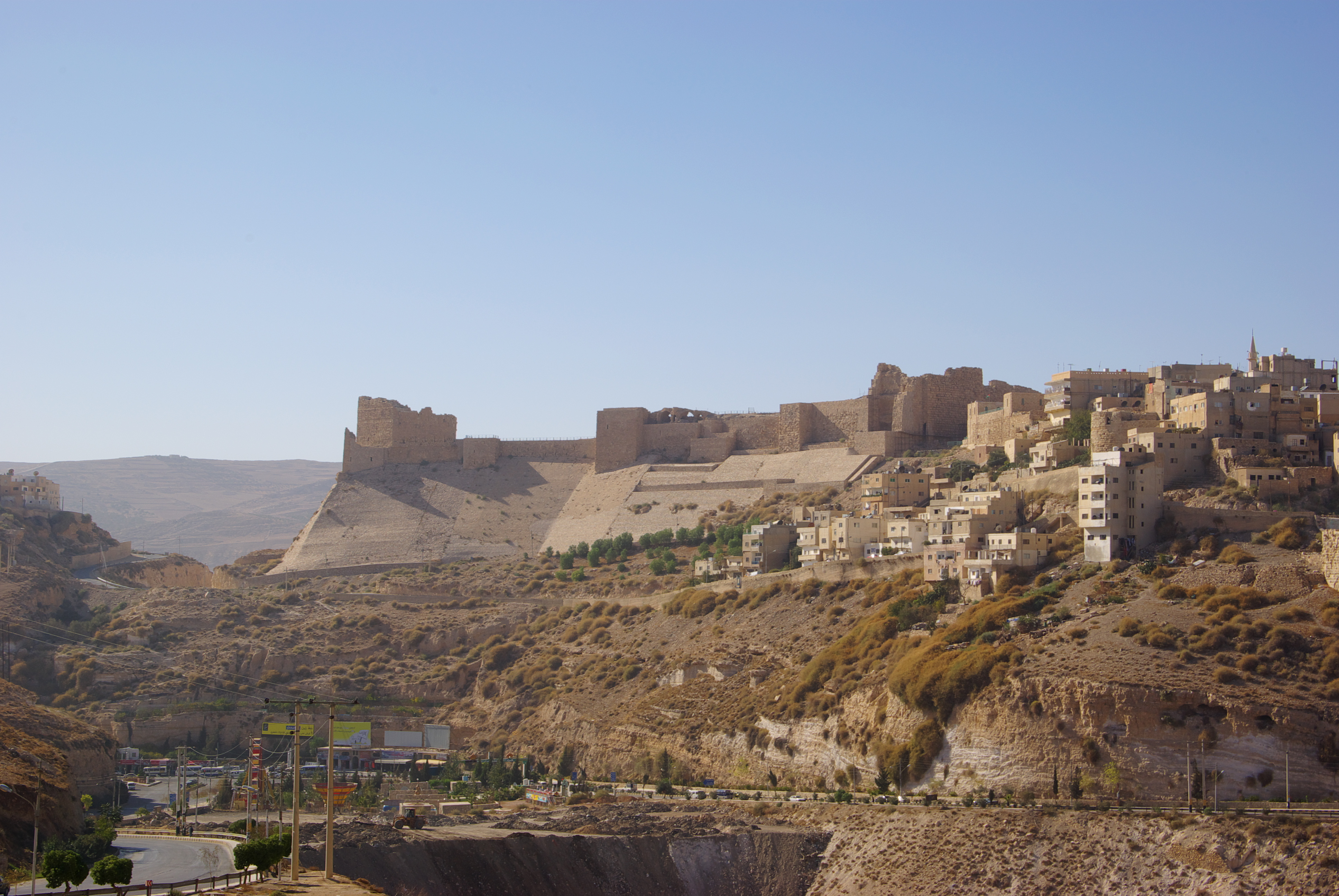
- Kerak Castle

Site information
- Type: Castle
- Controlled by: Oultrejordain; Ayyubids; Mamluk Sultanate; Ottoman Empire

Location
- Location within Jordan
- Coordinates: 31.18056°N 35.70139°E

Site history
- Built: 1142
- In use: 1142–1917
- Materials: Stone
- Battles/wars: Siege of Al-Karak (1183)

Garrison information
- Past commanders: Pagan the Butler; Raynald of Châtillon

Kerak Castle (Arabic: قلعة الكرك, romanized: Qal'at al-Karak) is a large medieval castle located in al-Karak, Jordan. It is one of the largest castles in the Levant. Construction began in the 1140s, under Pagan and Fulk, King of Jerusalem. The Crusaders called it Crac des Moabites or "Karak in Moab", as it is referred to in history books. It was also colloquially referred to as Krak of the Desert.

== History ==
=== Crusader period ===
Pagan the Butler was also Lord of Oultrejordain and Kerak Castle became the centre of his power, replacing the weaker castle of Montreal to the south. Because of its position east of the Dead Sea, Kerak Castle was able to control bedouin herders as well as the trade routes from Damascus to Egypt and Mecca. His successors, his nephew Maurice and Philip of Milly, added towers and protected the north and south sides with two deep rock-cut ditches (the southern ditch also serving as a cistern). The most notable Crusader architectural feature surviving is the north wall, into which are built immense arched halls on two levels. These were used for living quarters and stables, but also served as a fighting gallery overlooking the castle approach and for shelter against missiles from siege engines.

In 1176 Raynald of Châtillon gained possession of Kerak Castle after marrying Stephanie of Milly, the widow of Humphrey III of Toron (and daughter-in-law of Humphrey II of Toron). From Kerak Castle, Raynald harassed the trade camel trains and even attempted an attack on Mecca itself. In 1183 Saladin besieged the castle in response to Raynald's attacks. The siege took place during the marriage of Humphrey IV of Toron and Isabella I of Jerusalem, and Saladin, after some negotiations and with a chivalrous intent, agreed not to target their chamber while his siege machines attacked the rest of the castle. The siege was eventually relieved by Baldwin IV of Jerusalem.

Saladin besieged Kerak again in 1184. Saladin attempted to fill the ditches that prevented siege engines from getting in range of the castle wall. However, just like the first siege of Kerak, Saladin and his men left before a reinforcing crusader army could come to the castle's aid. This siege only lasted four weeks.

The last siege of the 12th century was led by Sa’d Al-Din, Saladin's nephew, in 1188. Unlike the sieges before it, the Muslim army was not under the threat of crusader reinforcements. The year before, Saladin had defeated an outnumbered crusader army at the Battle of Hattin and therefore the crusaders could not gather enough troops to reinforce Kerak. The Muslim army cut off supplies to the castle and Kerak surrendered after several months, due, it is believed, to a lack of arms, not a lack of food. With the fall of Kerak, the Castle of Montreal, which had been replaced as the centre of the lordship by Kerak, surrendered soon afterward.

=== Ayyubid period ===
Under the Ayyubid Dynasty, Kerak served as the administration centre for all of the regions of Jordan. When Saladin's brother, al-'Adil was awarded control of the castle, he made it the site of one of his treasuries. Kerak would continue to serve as the home of a royal treasury for the remainder of the Ayyubid Dynasty. During some internal conflict by members of the Ayyubid Dynasty in the 1230s and 40s, Kerak was one of the three princedoms that was able to remain independent. The castle was retaken by the Egyptian Sultan al- Salih Ayyub in 1249. Kerak was so important to the Ayyubids that it is recorded that only the governors of Kerak and Damascus were allowed to carry their official correspondences on red paper.

Under An-Nasir Dawud, much of the defenses of Kerak were expanded and improved in 1244-45. In 1227, the Sultan of Damascus al-Mu'azzam 'Isa, commissioned the construction of a tunnel that ran from the castle into the town.

=== Mamluk period ===
In 1263, the Mamluk Sultan Baibars enlarged and built a tower on the northwest corner. Under the Mamluks, Kerak continued to remain an important administrative centre. Ibn 'Abd al-Zahir stated that the castle held four ministries: the ministry of the army, the ministry of finance, the ministry of Kerak and the chancery. Due to the castle's importance, it also maintained a significant military force, which under the rule of al-Mughith, contained at least 700 horsemen.

=== Ottoman period ===
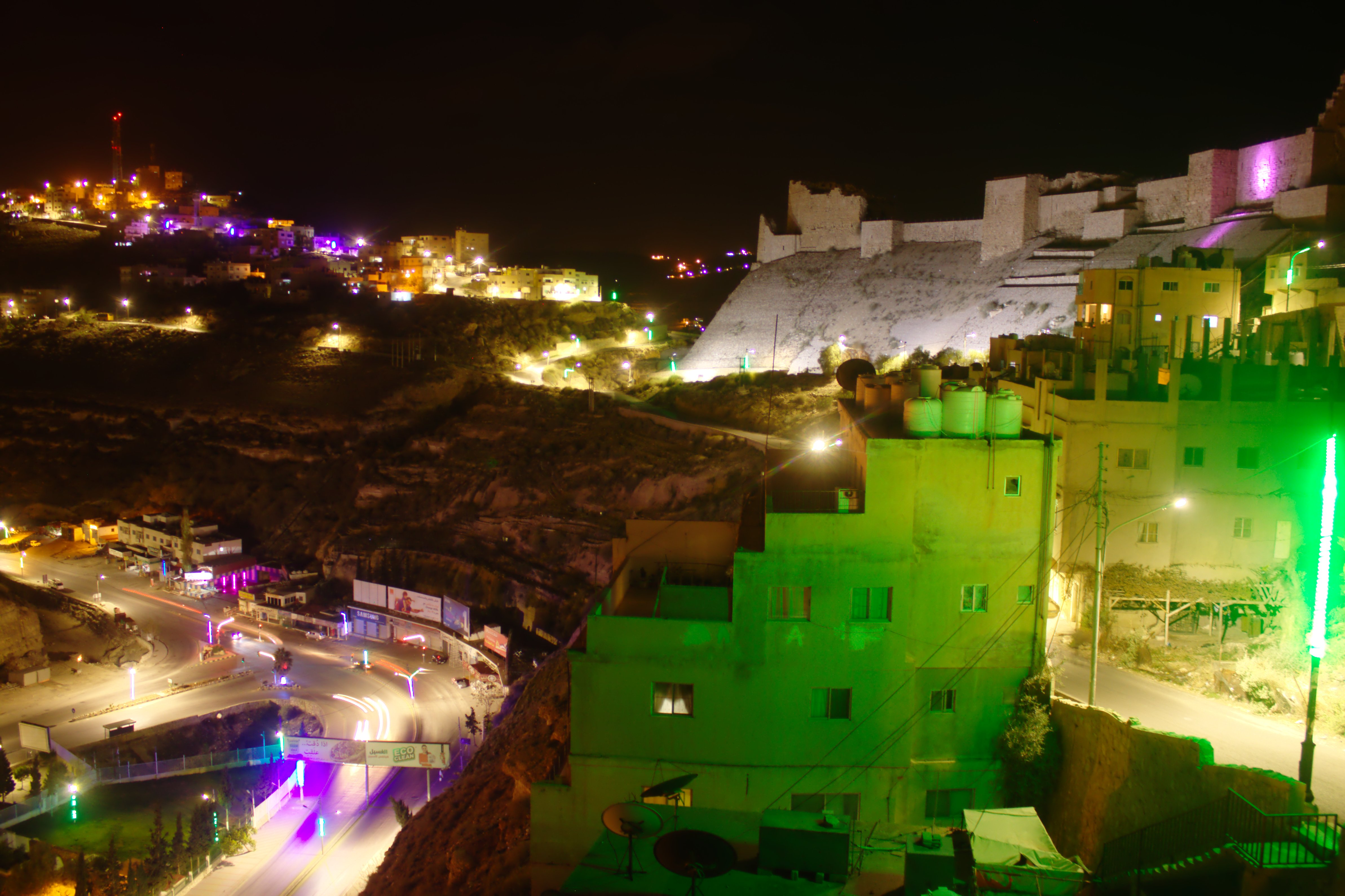
A night view of the castle

During the Ottoman Empire, it played an important role due to its strategic location on the crossroads between the Arabian Peninsula, Egypt and the region of Syria.

In 1834, the leaders of the peasants' revolt in Palestine took refuge in Kerak. Ibrahim Pasha of Egypt besieged the castle, and destroyed much of its fortifications in the process.

In 1893, the Ottoman authorities reestablished control over the area by appointing a mutasarrıf (governor) resident in Kerak Castle with a garrison of 1400, including 200 cavalry. Parts of the castle were reused. Some of the destruction that had occurred to the structure was due to locals removing stones containing potassium nitrate ("saltpetre"), which is used to make gunpowder. Medieval historian Paul Deschamps studied Crusader castles in the 1920s. Amongst the important research done by Deschamps, in 1929 he and architect François Anus created the first accurate plans of Kerak Castle.

=== Jordan ===
On 18 December 2016, the castle was the site of a terrorist attack. Fourteen people were killed and 34 were injured, the majority being Jordanian security forces and local civilians. A Canadian tourist was also killed.

== Architecture ==
=== Type and fortification ===
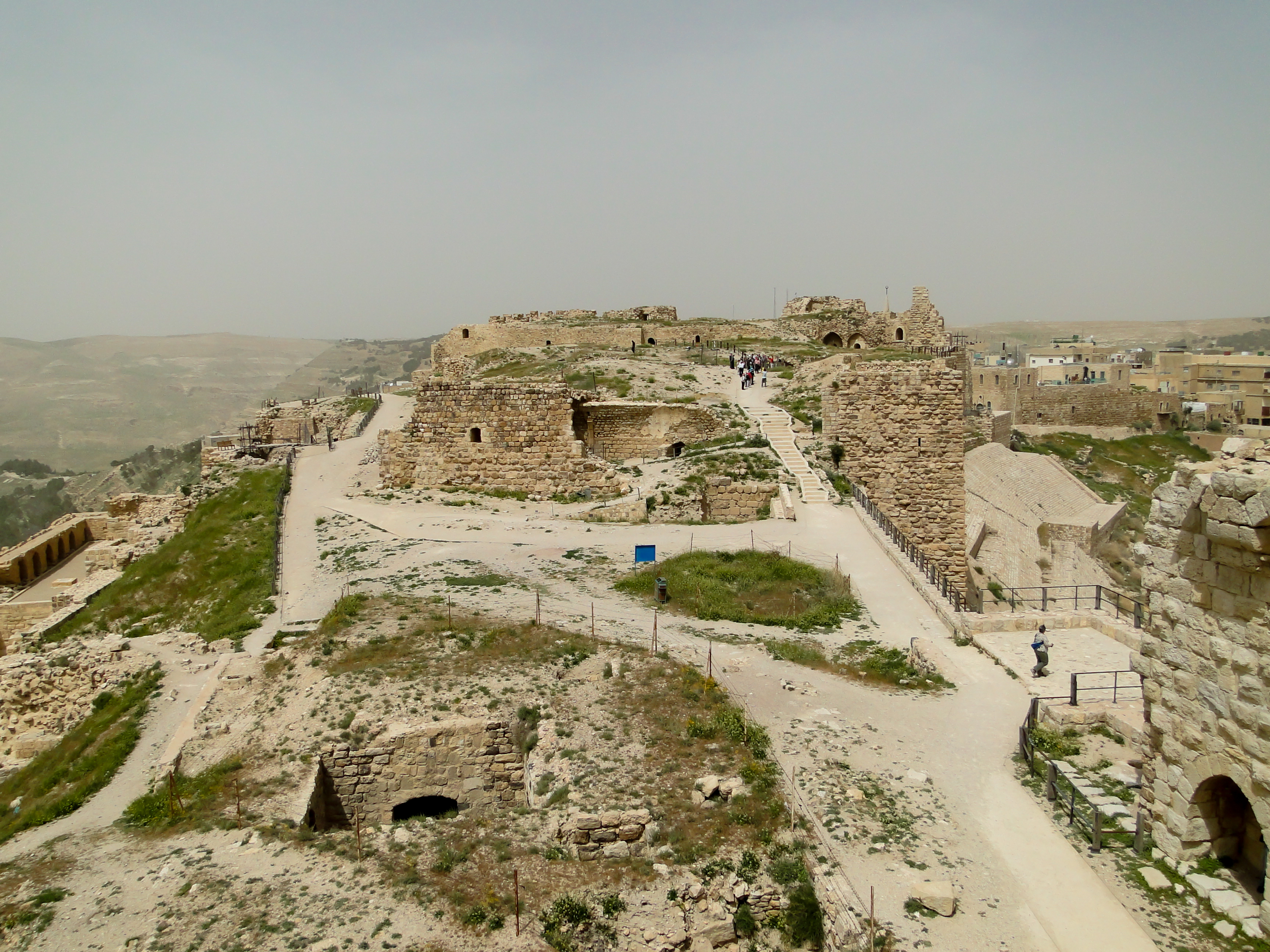
The upper court

Kerak Castle is an example of one of the first castles built by the Franks that used a fortified tower structure and is a notable example of Crusader architecture, a mixture of west European, Byzantine, and Arab designs. Many early Frankish castles that predate Kerak were merely towers built along the crusader states during the early years of crusading. In the second half of the twelfth century, the growing Muslim threat made crusaders update their castle design and prioritize defensive elements.

While Kerak Castle is a large and strong castle, its design is less sophisticated than that of concentric crusader castles like Krak des Chevaliers, and its masonry is comparatively crude. Many of its defenses were destroyed and rebuilt during its conquest by the Ayyubids and Mamluks.

Kerak Castle is a prime example of a spur castle, a castle built on top of a mountain to take advantage of the natural topography, as it is built on the southern end of a plateau surrounded on three sides by steep hills. This had the advantage during a siege of concentrating an attack on only one side of the castle, so the defenders could locate most of their manpower there.

The castle also used man-made fortifications, including ditches and thick stone walls. Because Muslim armies started to move with siege weapons such as siege engines, Frankish castles started adapting by building thicker and more solid walls. A "Byzantine ditch", a ditch or moat to keep siege engines at a safer distance, was constructed near the castle. There is another ditch near the town which is much deeper but less wide, to the west of the castle (now almost completely filled-in). It also has a glacis, an artificial slope made of steep, slippery masonry at the base of the walls that hindered attackers in their attempt to climb the walls and kept them exposed for longer to the defenders.

=== Stonework ===
The crusaders used rough-shaped volcanic stone to build large walls around the perimeter of the castle. After Sa'd al-Din captured Kerak, the Muslims used limestone from nearby quarries to repair and expand the castle. Both the Muslim and Christian stonework show signs of draft masonry, stone blocks which are smooth on the edges, but the centre portion is left rough and raised.

=== Towers ===
The castle walls are strengthened with rectangular projecting towers, pointing to the fact that it was one of the earlier castles constructed by crusaders, it was only later on in the crusades that the transition to round towers in the curtain wall was made to help with visibility. At Kerak, the towers are much closer together than at other castles, theoretically to help with visibility problems. The towers were also placed at regular points along the wall; this is called the Byzantine tower structure—the square towers at Kerak are identical to the ones used by the Byzantine empire.

=== Chapel ===
A chapel was built on the east side of the castle, about half-way along the length of the curtain wall.

== Present day ==
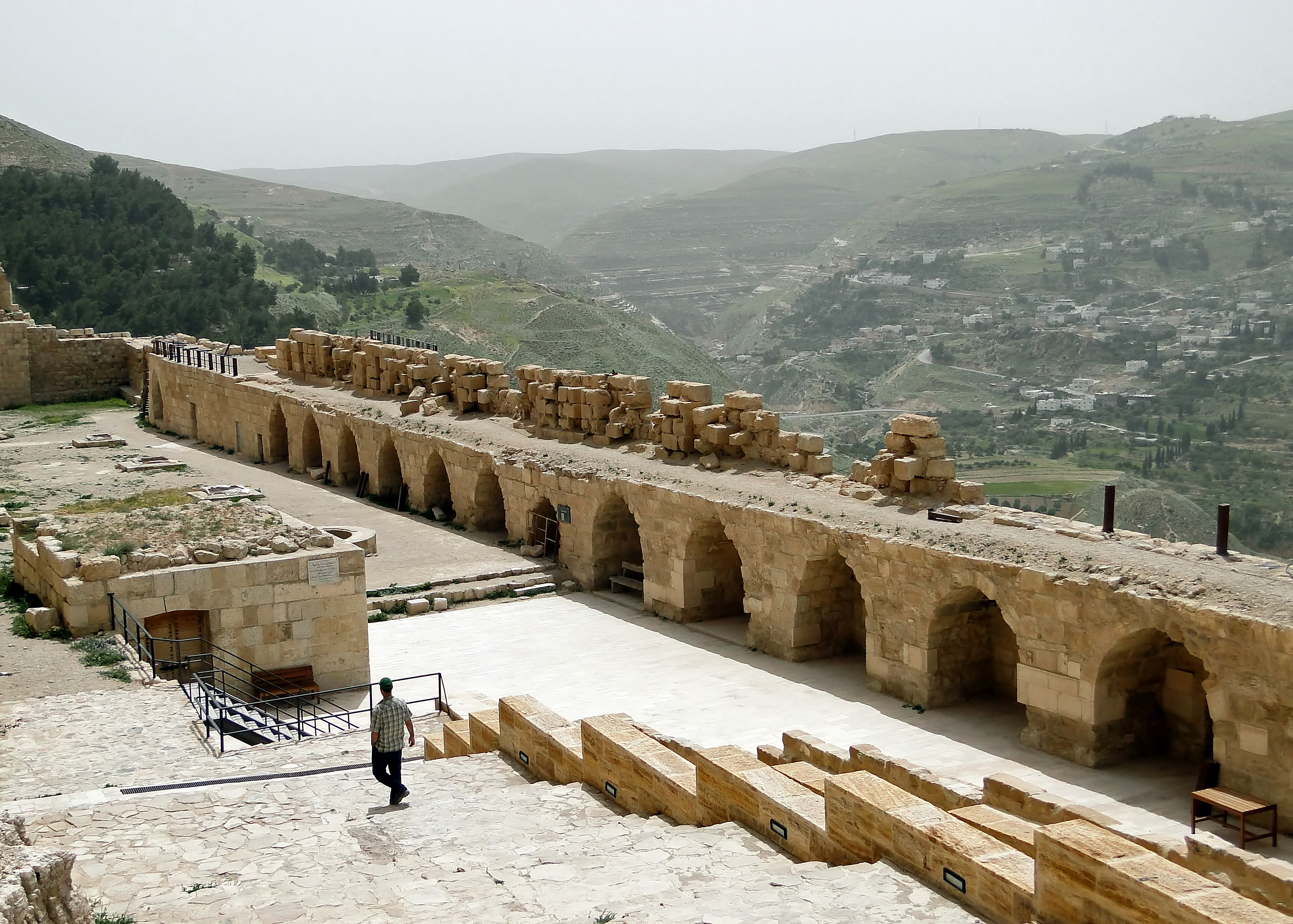
The lower court

While Kerak Castle had historically been used to protect the assets of crusader states in the Latin Kingdom of Jerusalem, today its job is much more mundane. The city bordering on Kerak Castle is home to roughly 170,000 people and is a "lively tourist destination." Many people travel along the ancient King's Highway to stop at Kerak on their way to other tourist sites. In 1985 the World Heritage Committee decided that Kerak should not be an UNESCO site as there were "more representative examples of crusader castles". This is in part because the castle is not in the best condition and there are multiple examples of crusader castles in the Transjordan that are in better repair.

In December 2016, Kerak was the target of a terrorist attack which left 14 dead, including two civilians and a Canadian citizen. It is said that after clashing with police, the terrorists withdrew into the castle and held civilian hostages. There are not many references to Kerak Castle in popular culture today, however it did play a large role in the 2005 film Kingdom of Heaven.

The nearby Al Karak Archaeology Museum introduces the local history and archaeology of the region around Kerak Castle – the land of Moab – from prehistory until the Islamic era. The history of Crusaders and Muslims at Kerak Castle and town is introduced in detail. Originally located in the castle's Lower Court, the museum moved in 2019 to an historic Ottoman building just outside the castle and facing the main castle wall.

== Gallery ==
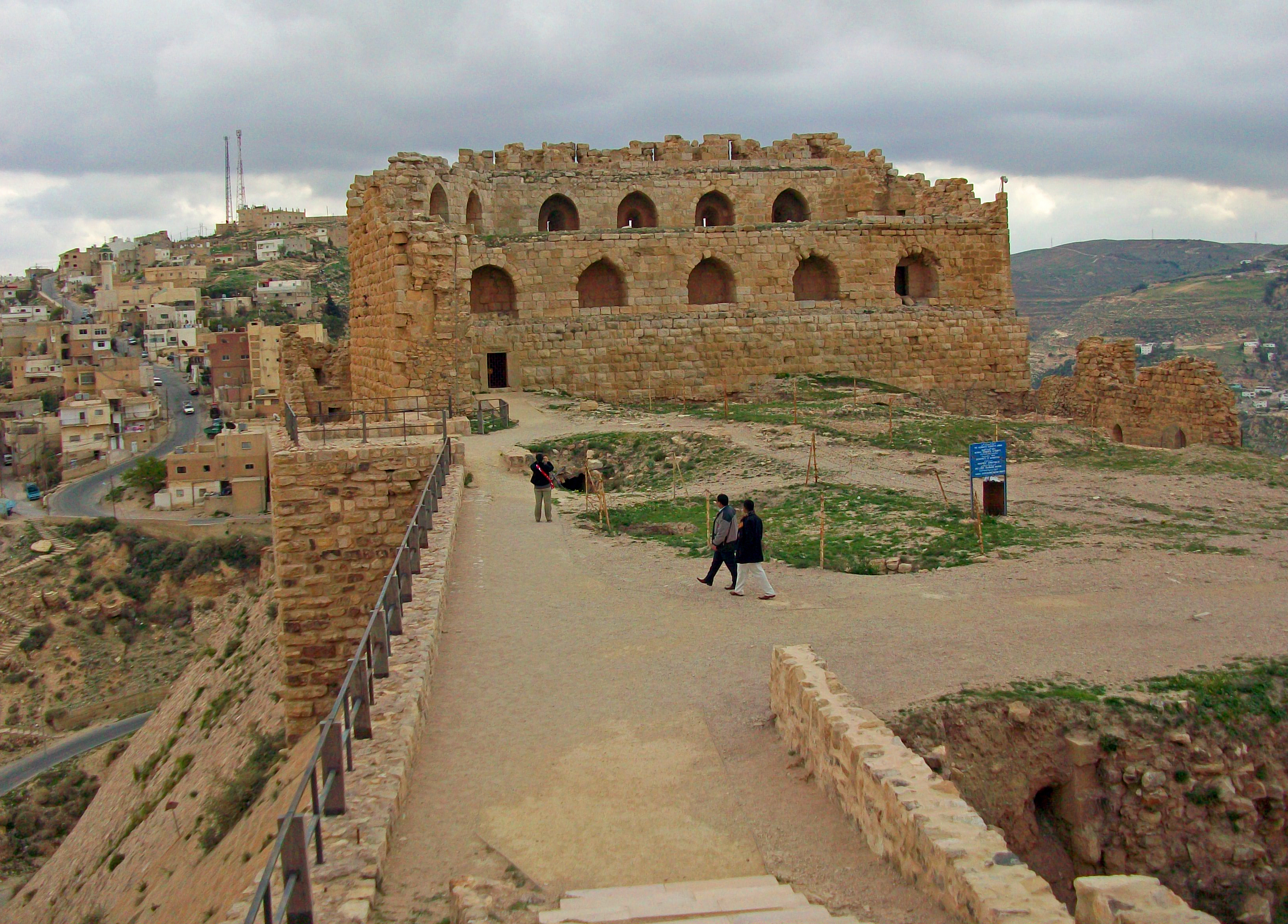
Kerak Castle and al-Karak, Jordan

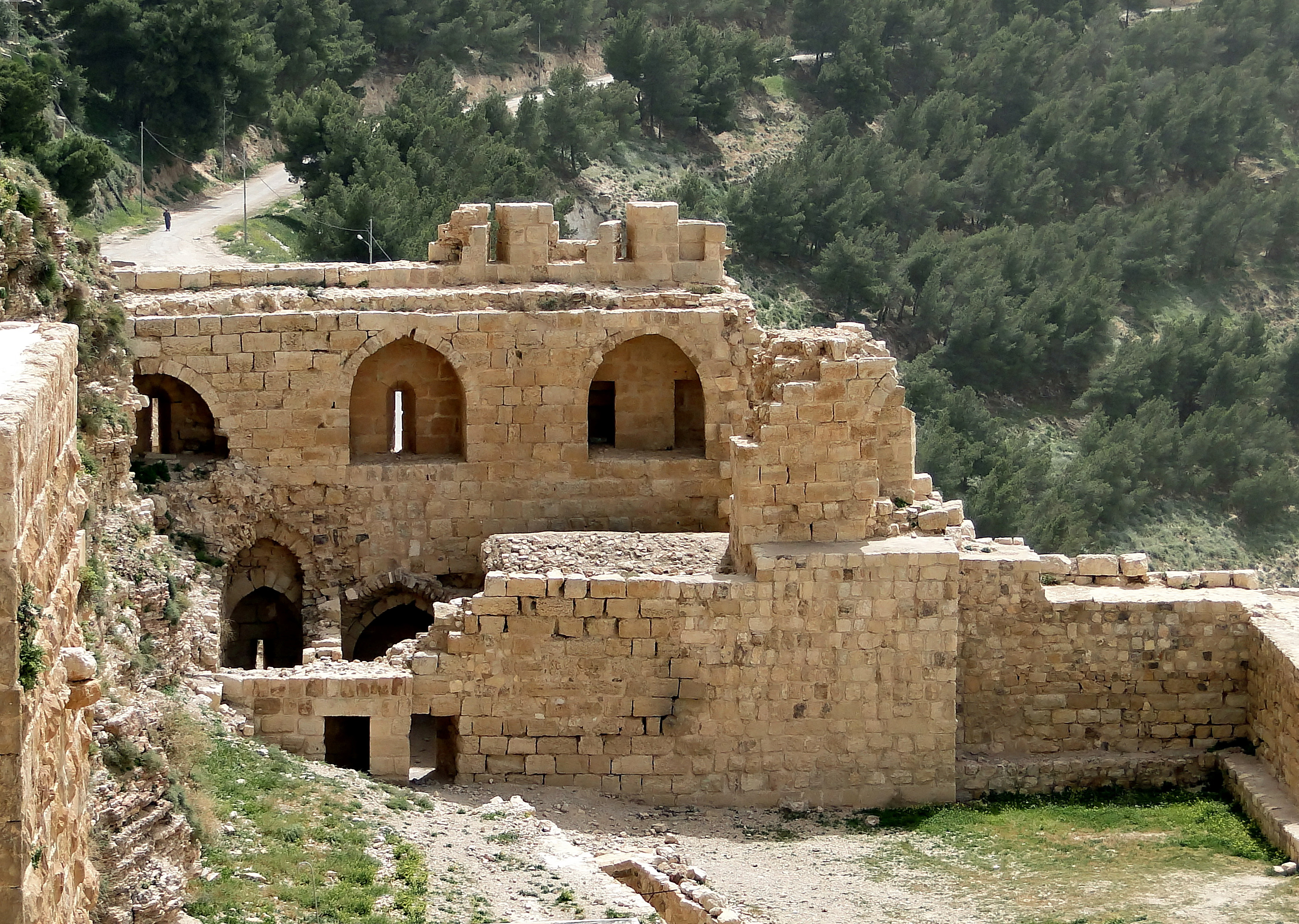
Kerak Castle

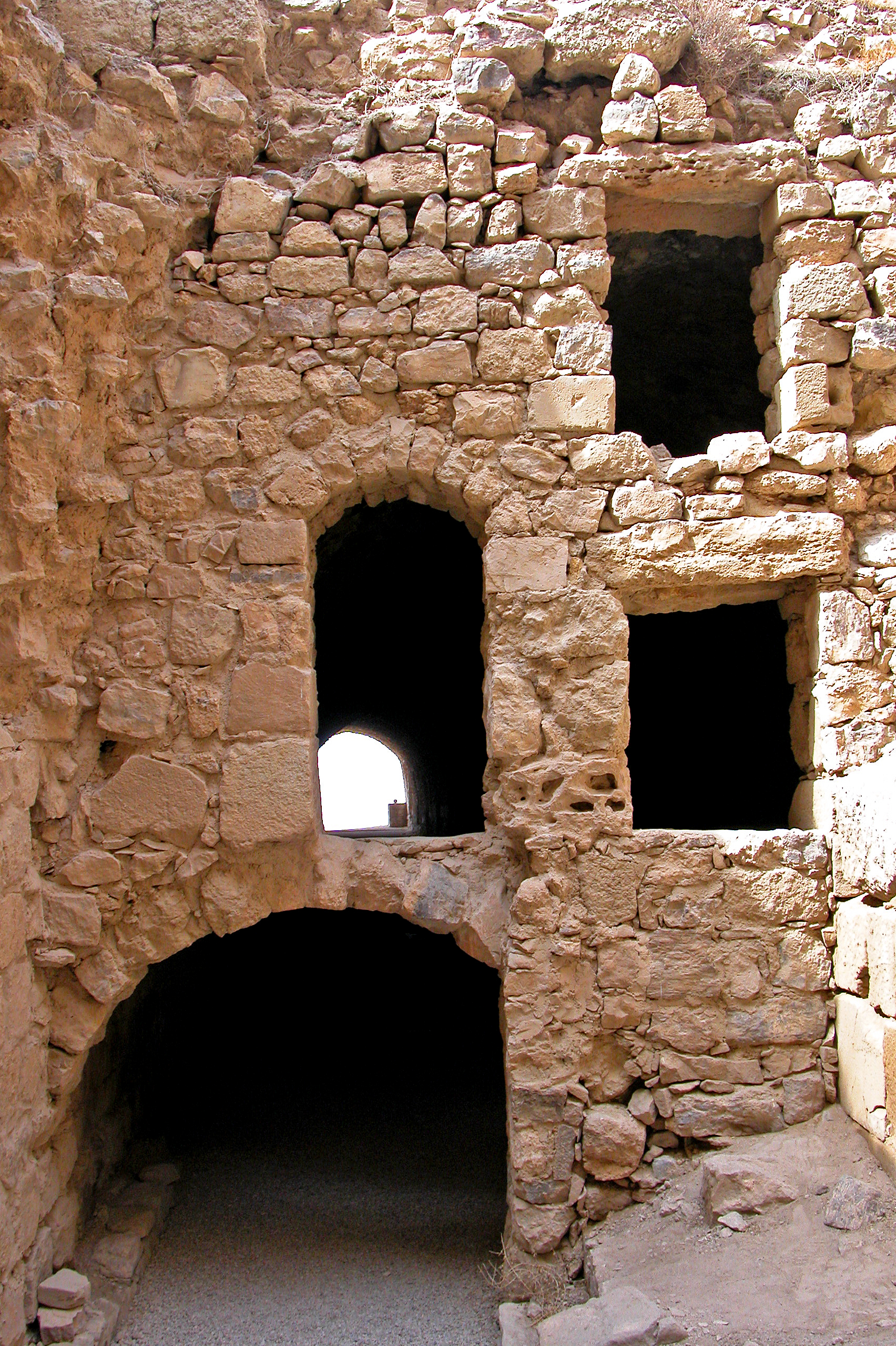
Kerak Castle, interior

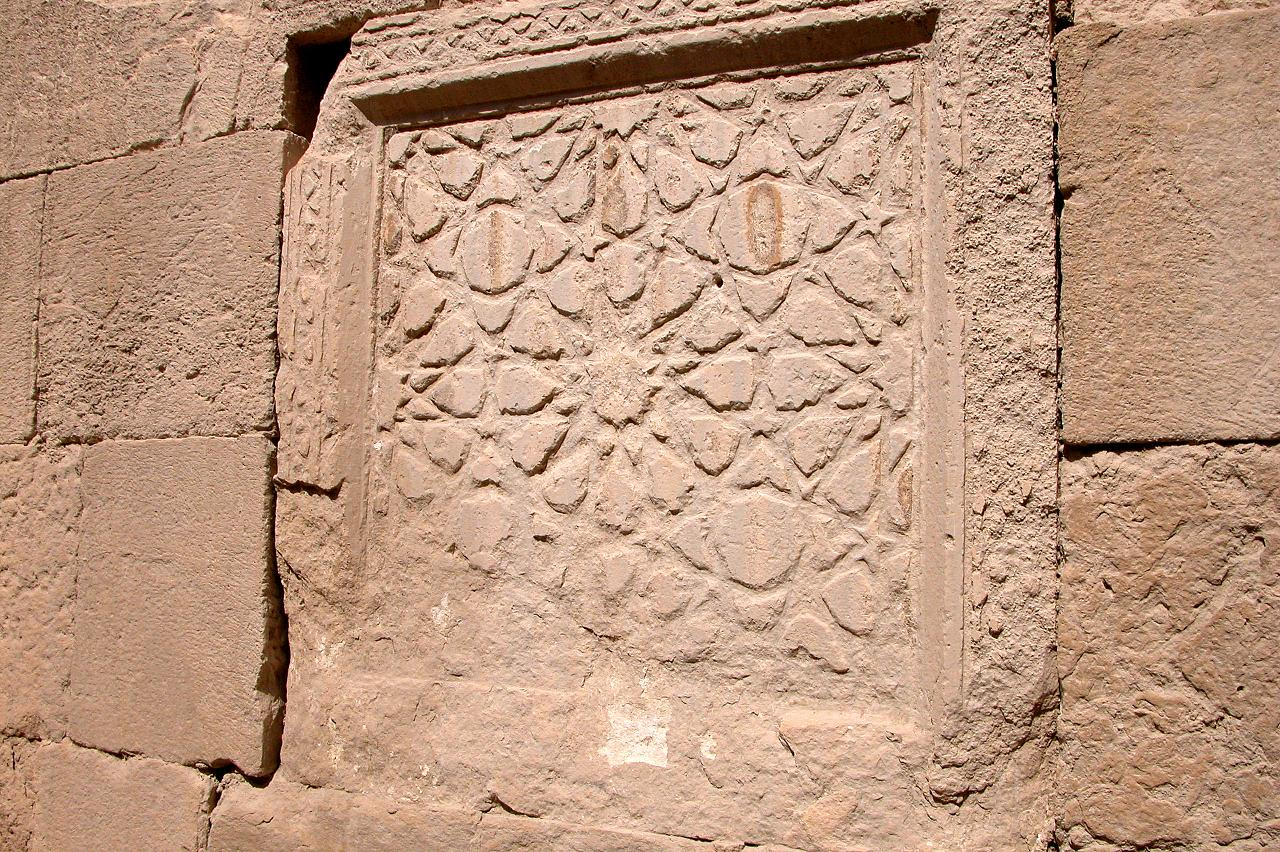
Kerak Castle, wall ornamentation

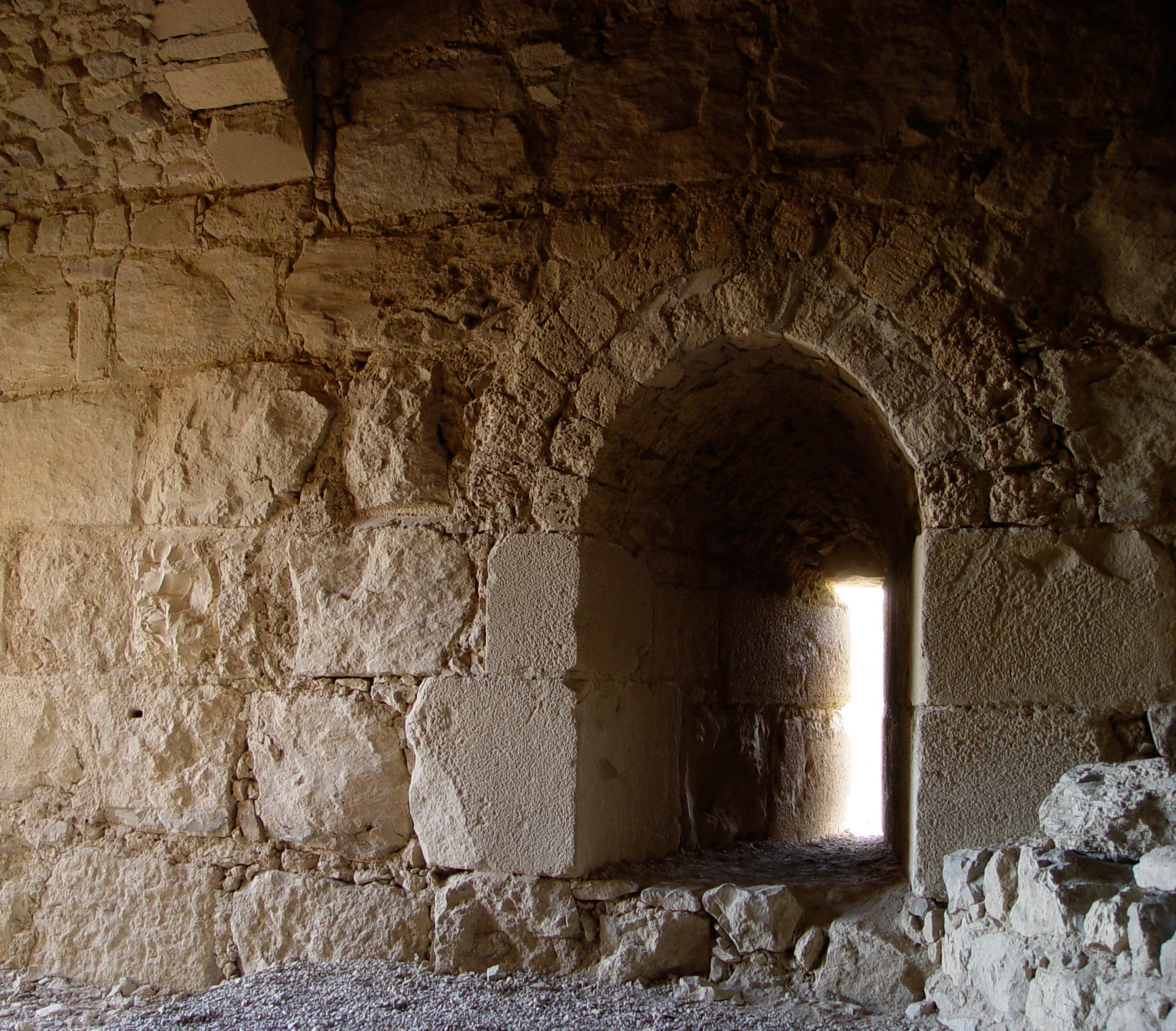
Inside Kerak Castle

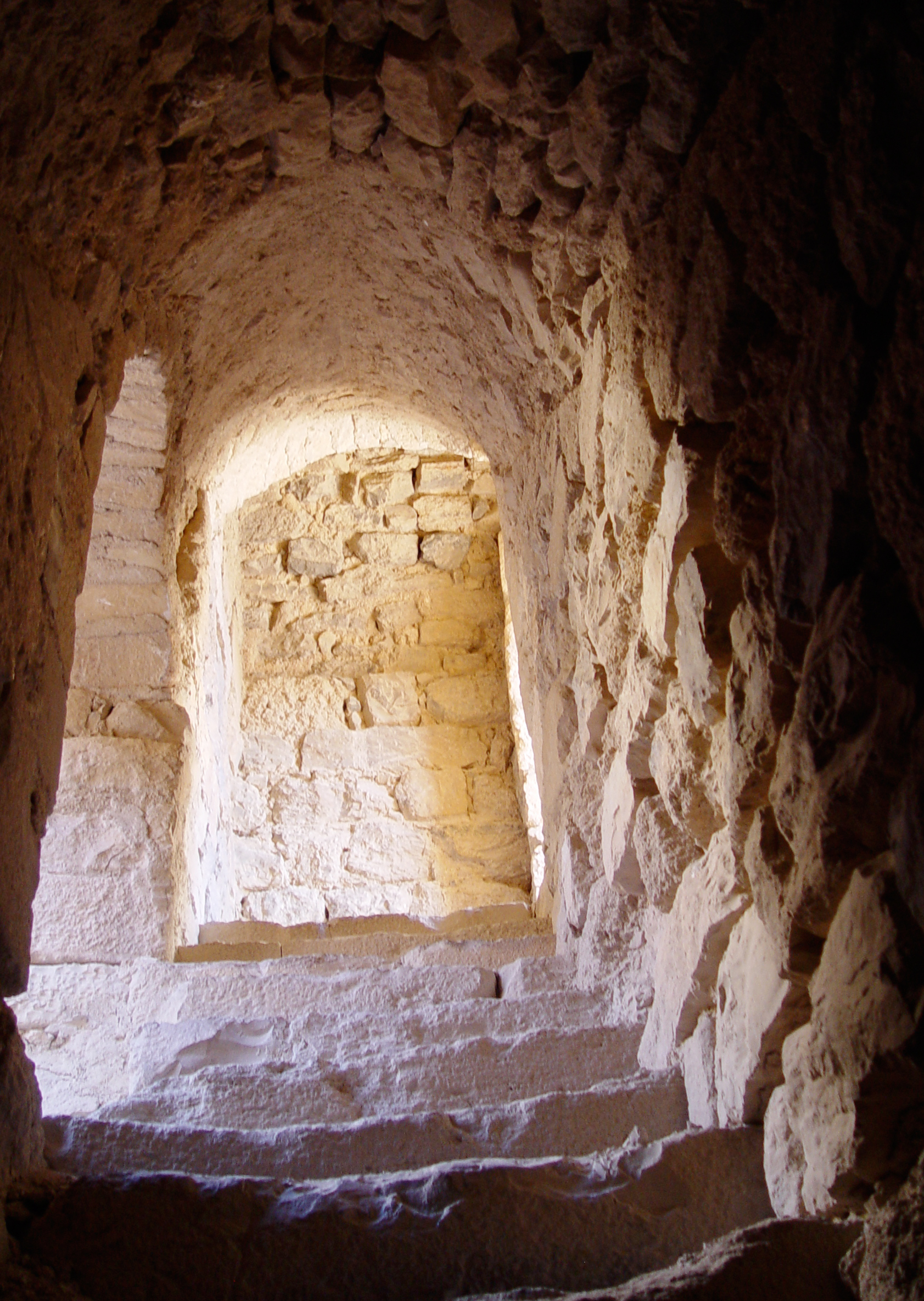
Inside Kerak Castle

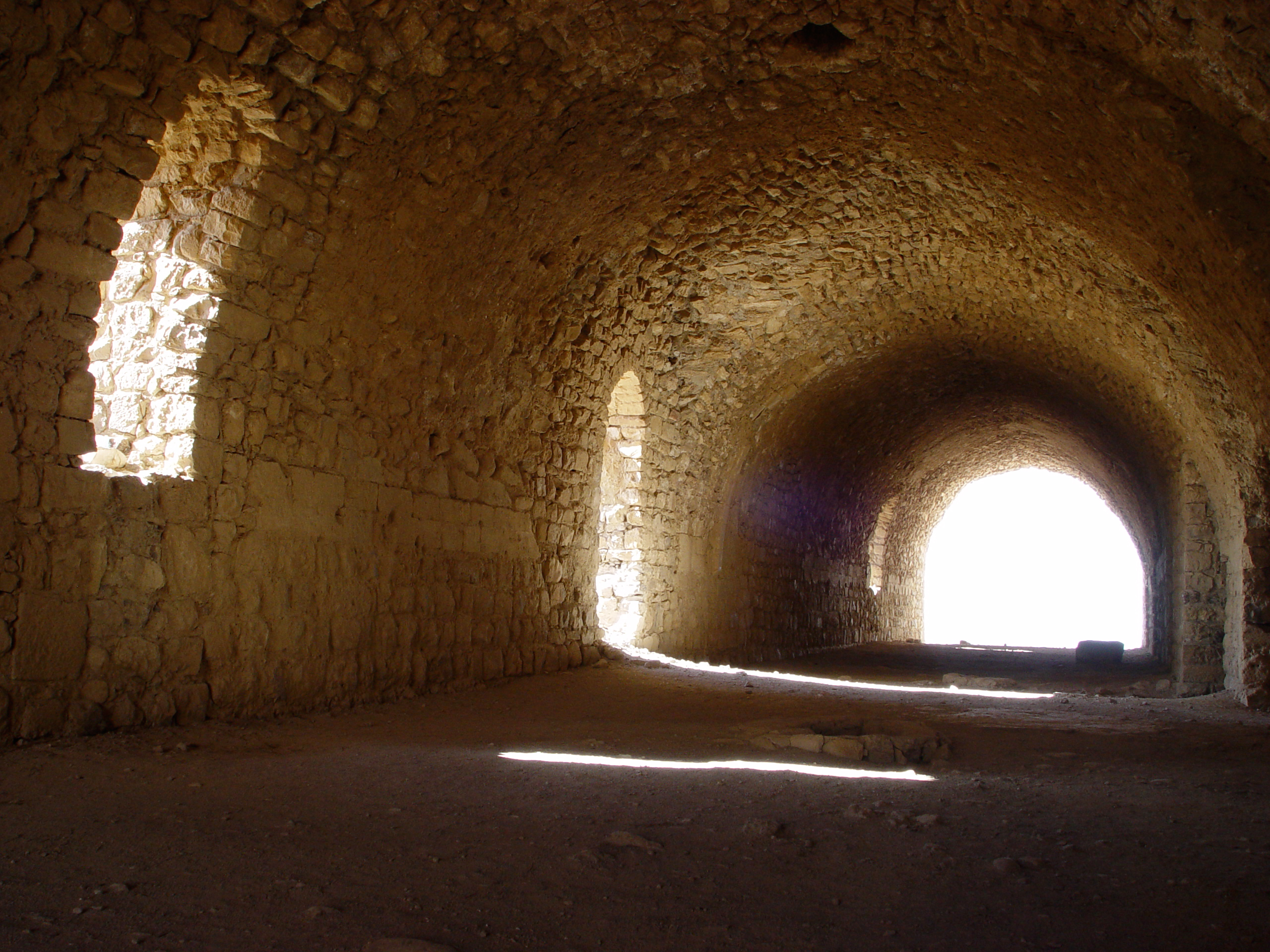
Inside Kerak Castle

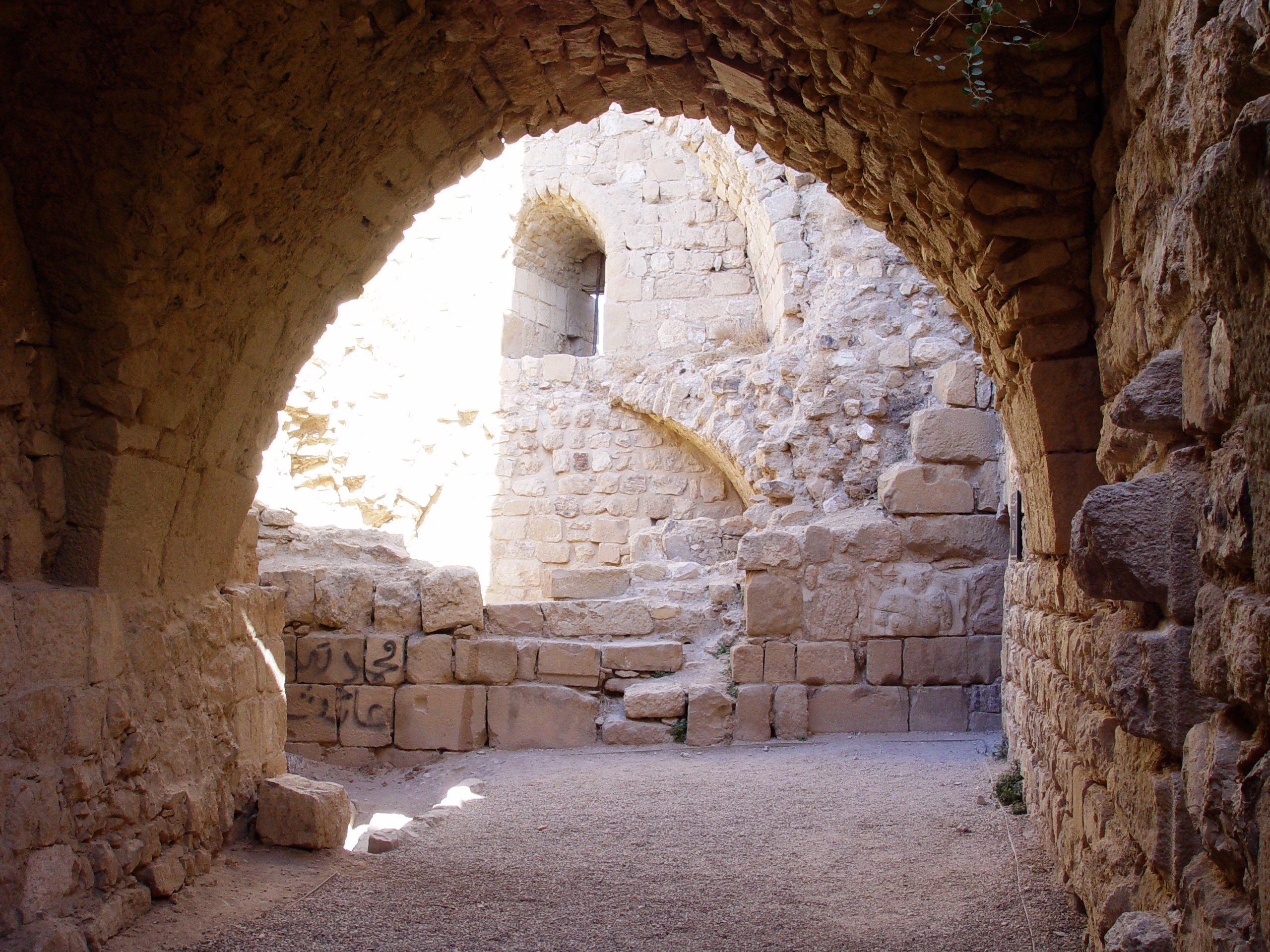
Inside Kerak Castle

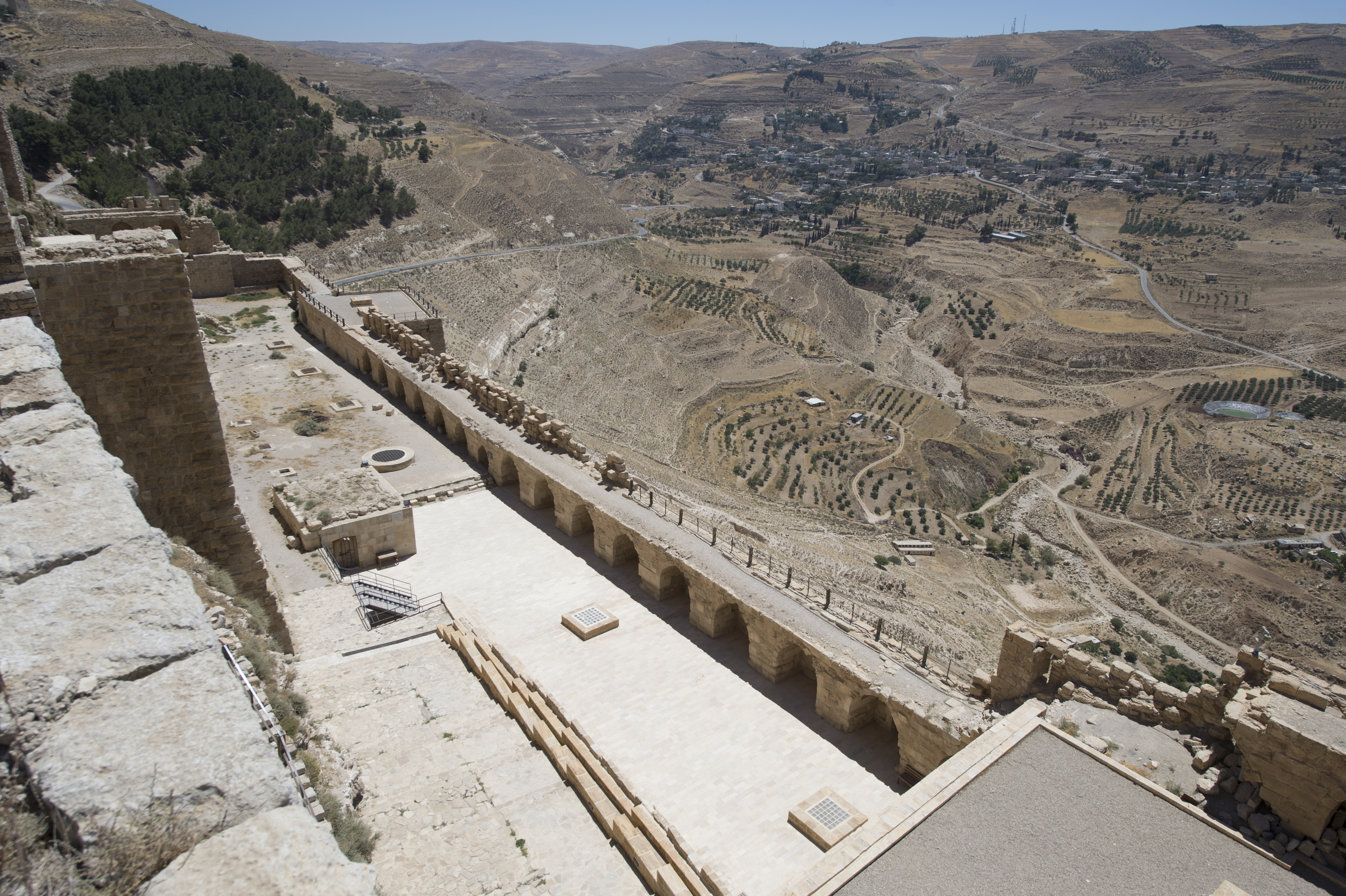
Jordan Kerak west flank

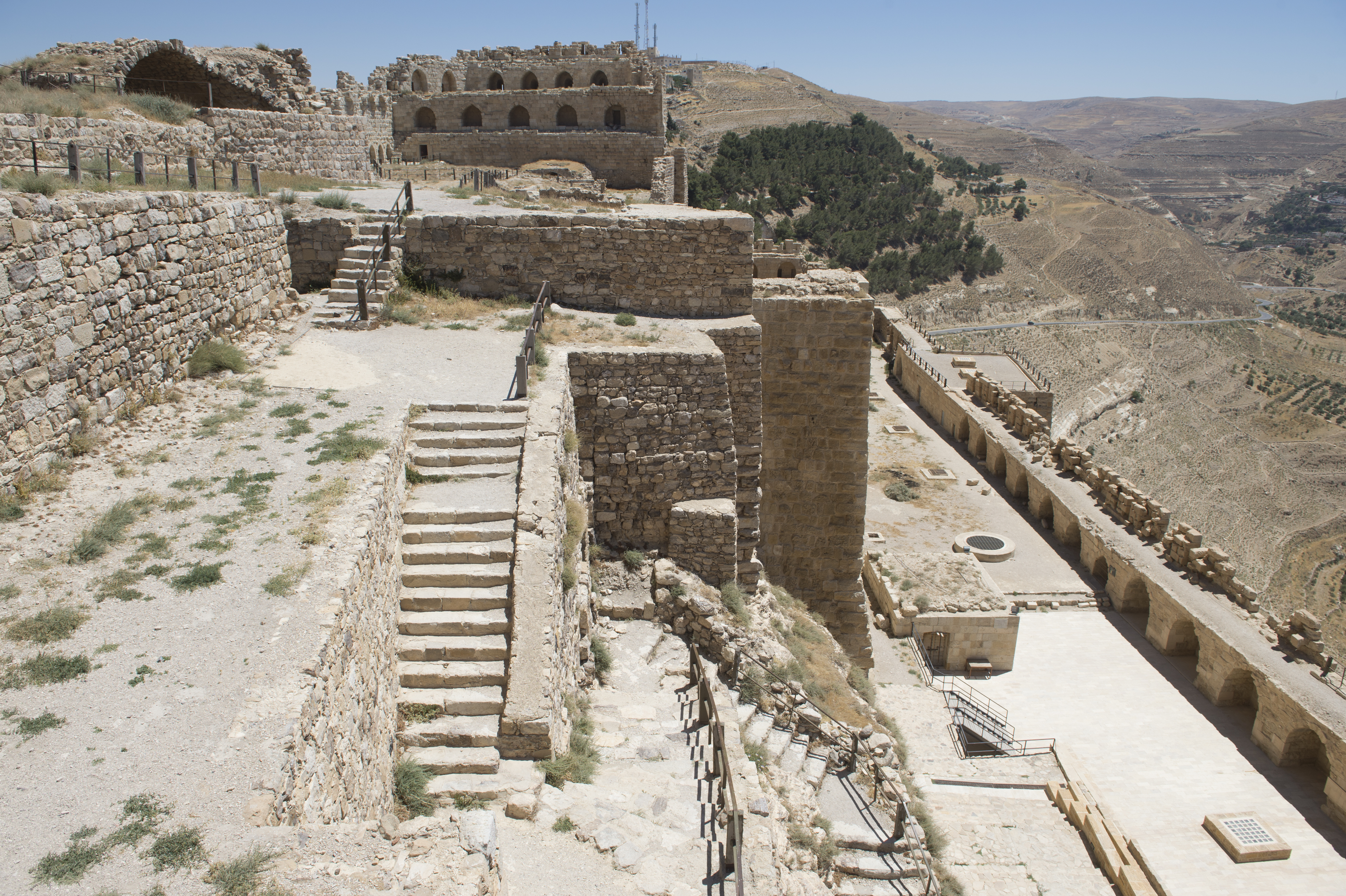
Jordan Kerak west flank

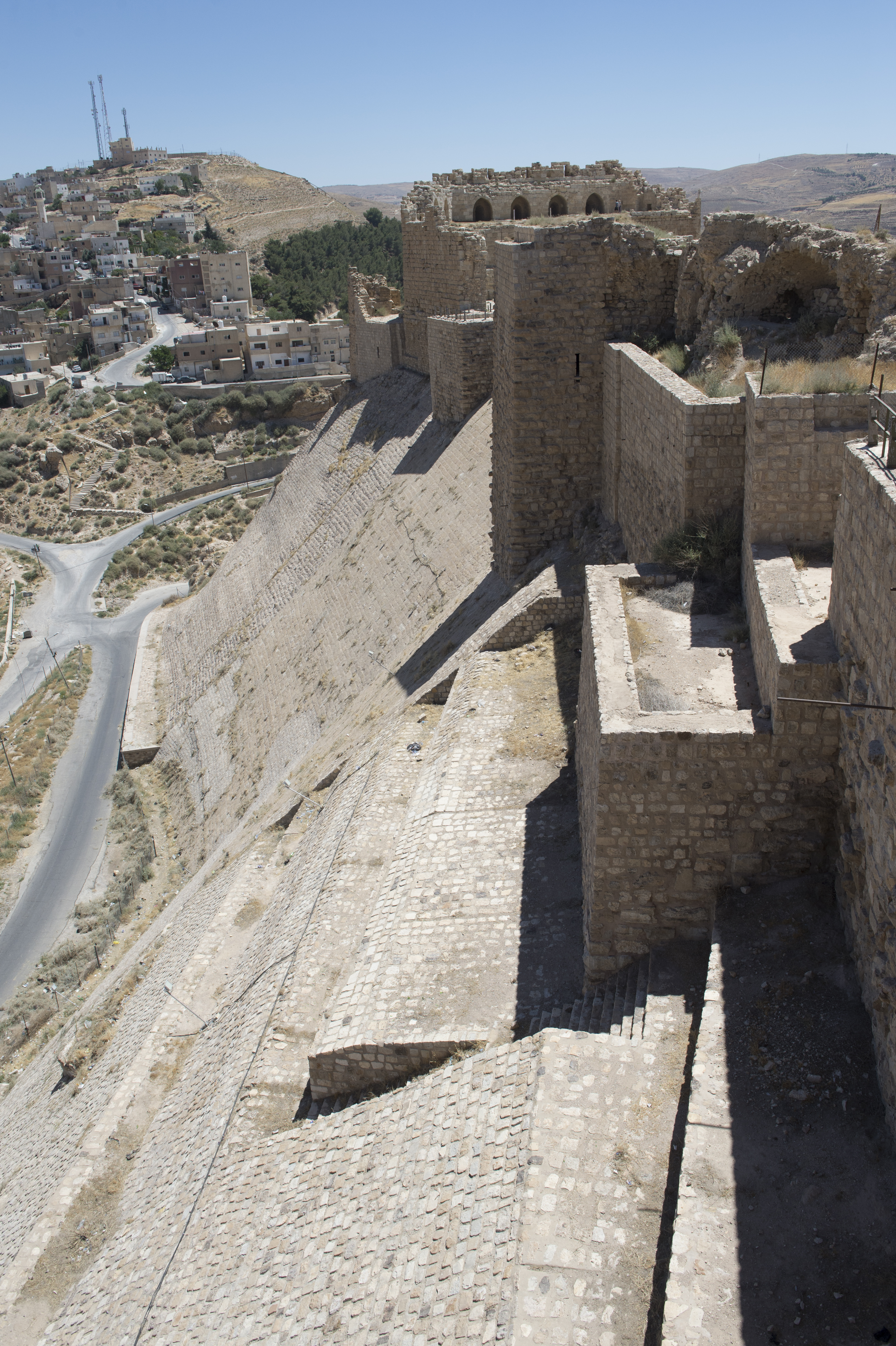
Jordan Kerak east flank

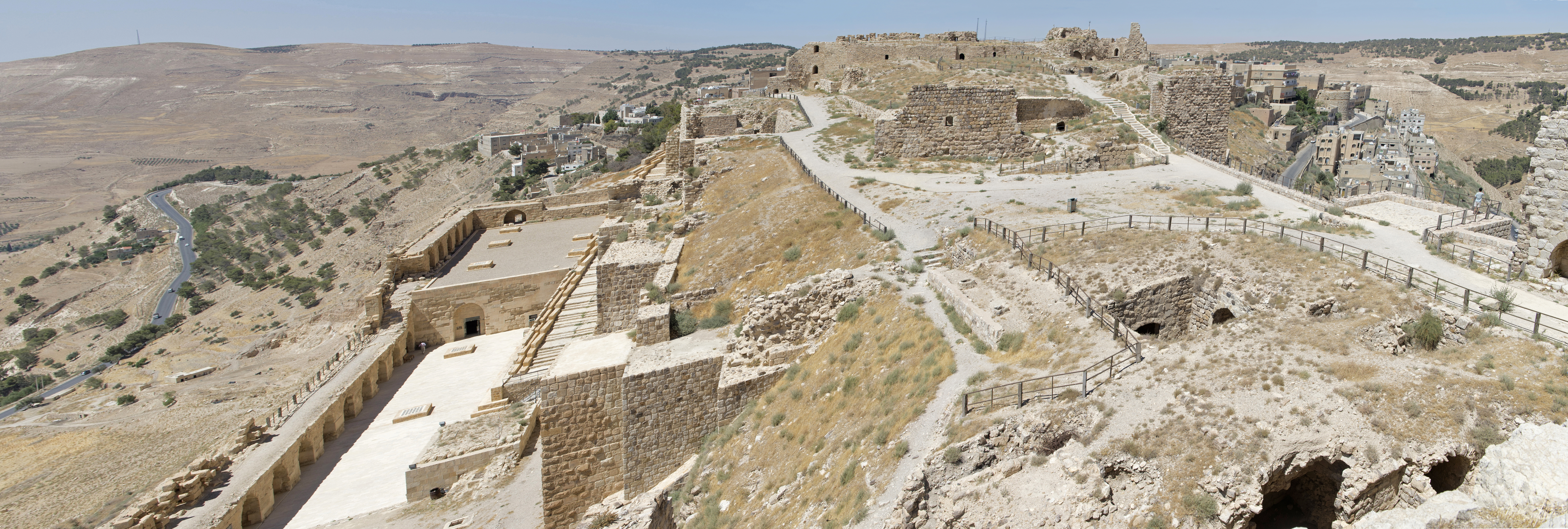
Jordan Kerak panorama

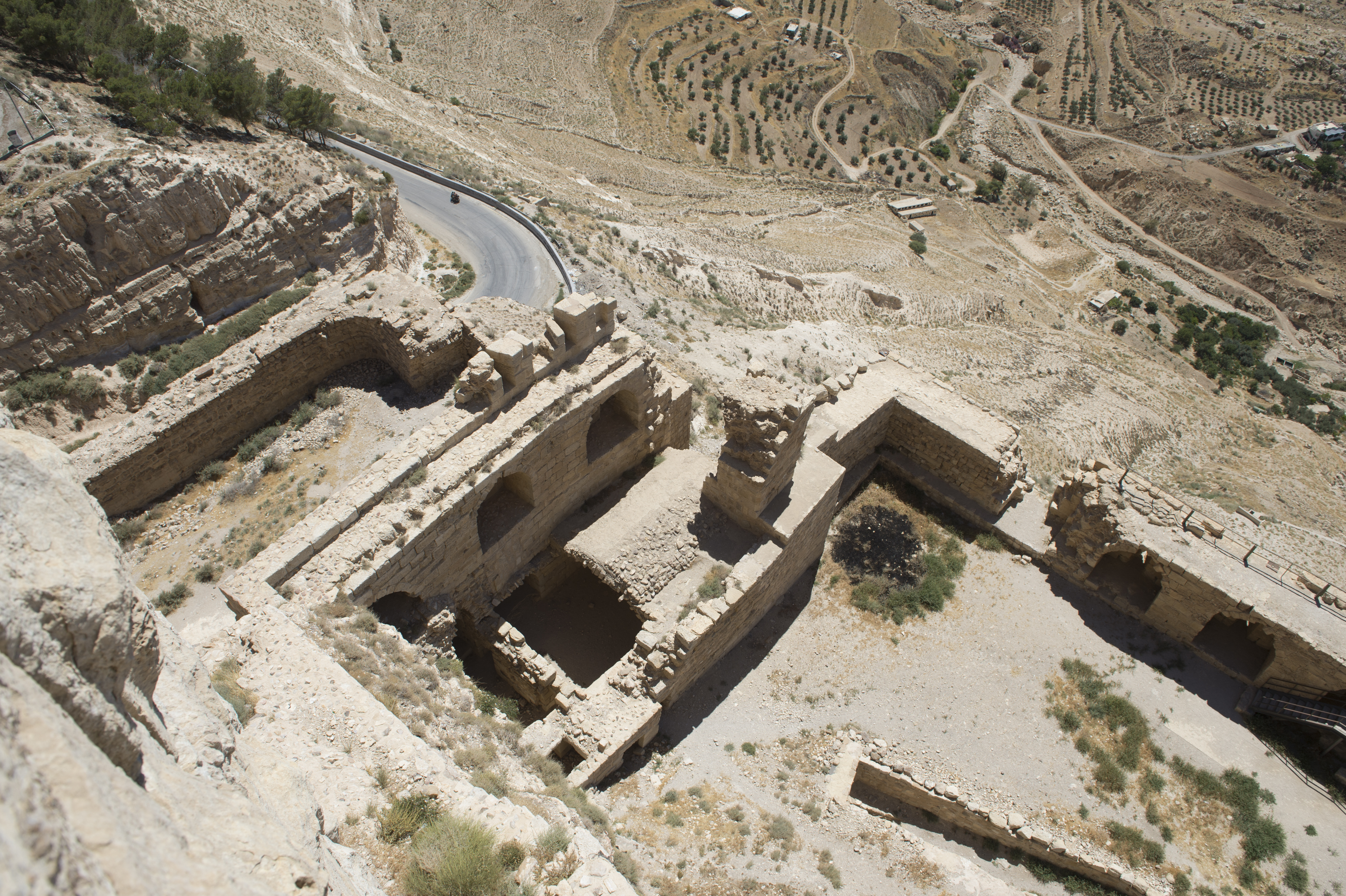
Jordan Kerak Some of the east flank

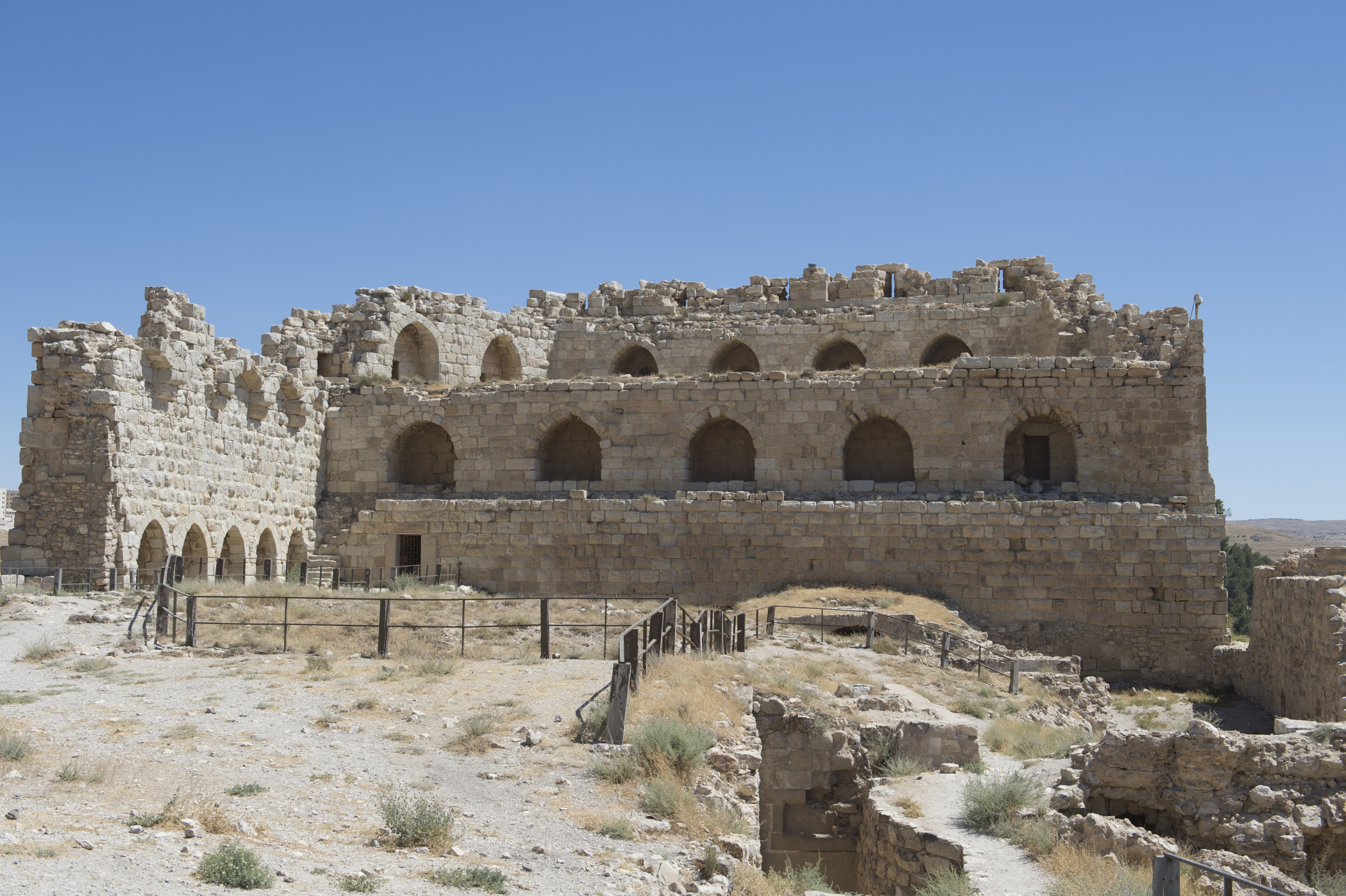
Jordan Kerak palace area

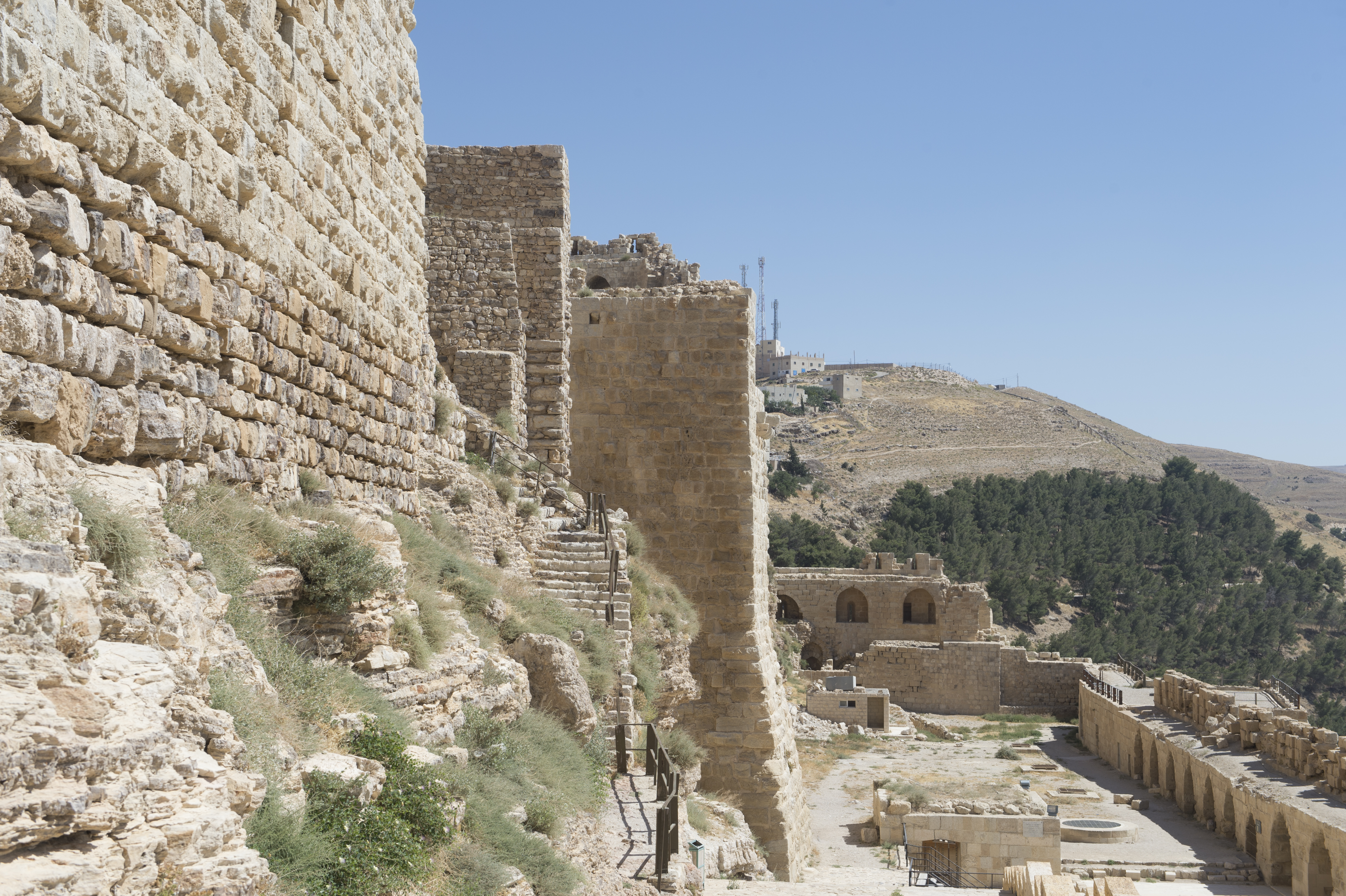
Jordan Kerak west flank

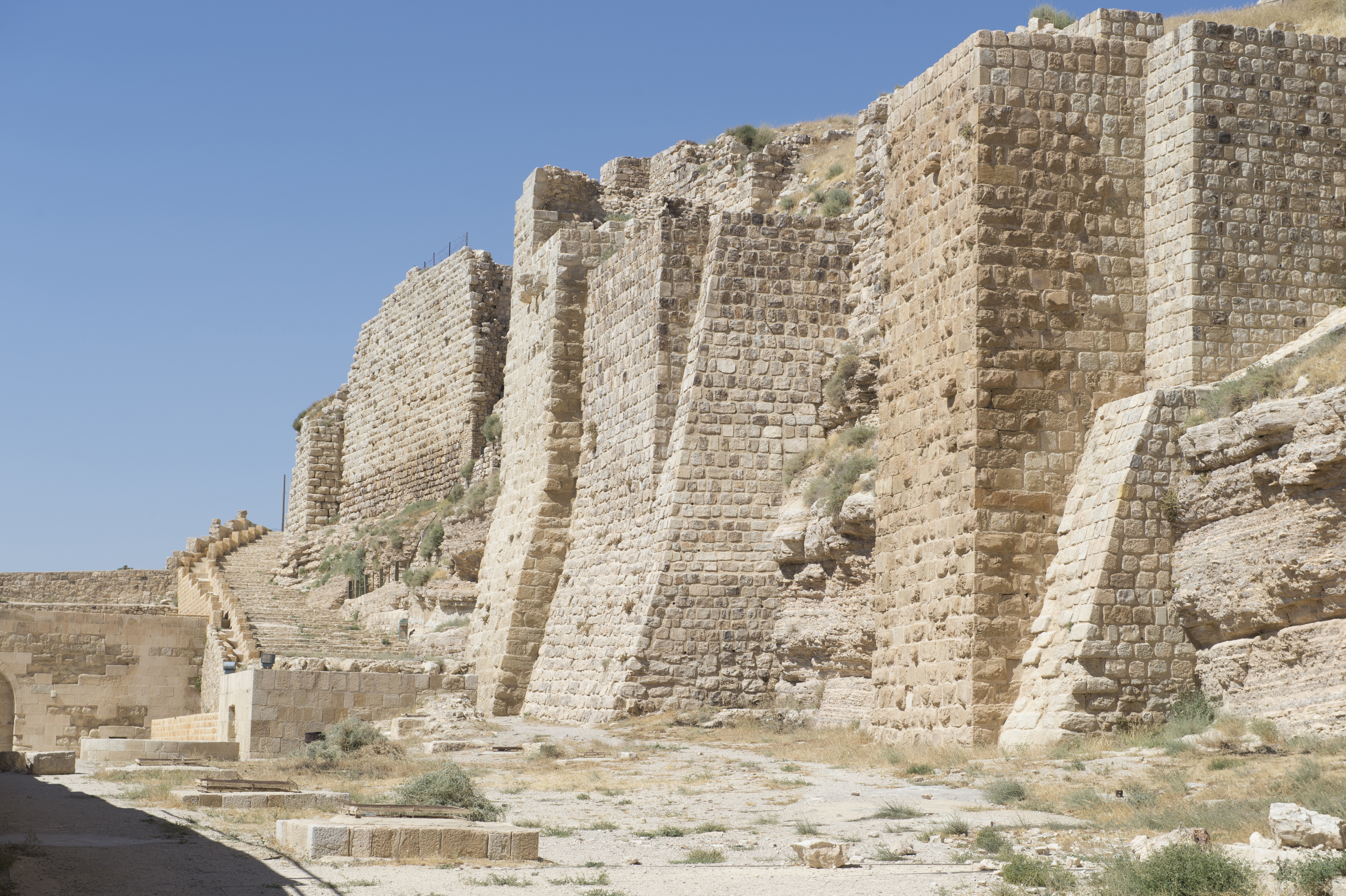
Jordan Kerak castle

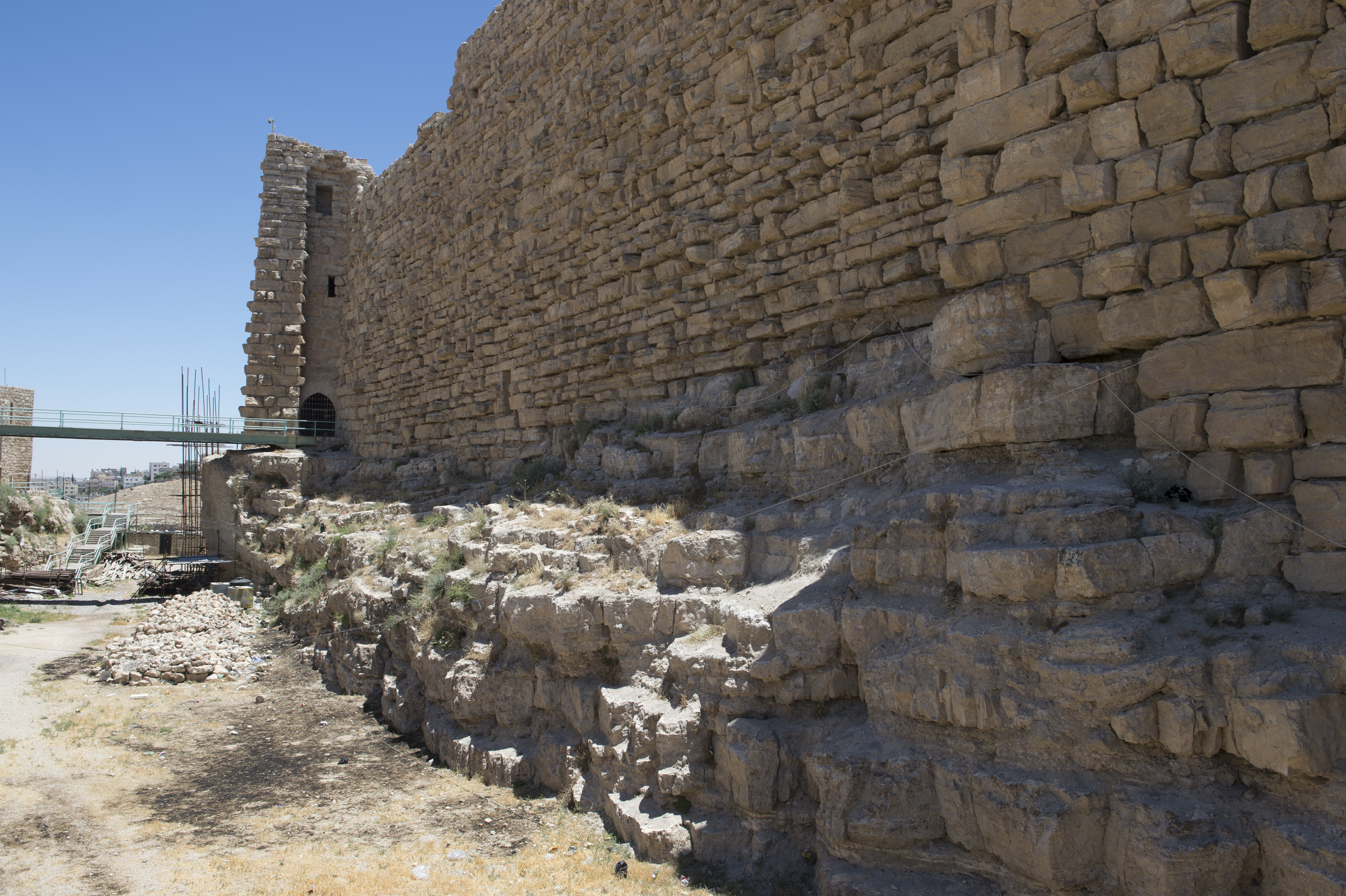
Jordan Kerak moat

== See also ==
- List of castles in Jordan
- Wu'ayra Castle (li Vaux Moysi), an outpost of Montreal near Petra
