= Ziad Al-Karbouly =

Aide to Abu Musab al-Zarqawi (1970–2015)

- زياد خلف الكربولي
- Born: Ziyad Khalaf al-Karbouly; 1970; Al-Qa'im, Iraq
- Died: 4 February 2015 (aged 44–45); Swaqa Prison, Jordan
- Cause of death: Execution by hanging
- Criminal penalty: Death

Ziyad Khalaf al-Karbouly (Arabic: زياد خلف الكربولي; 1970 – died 4 February 2015), a native of Al-Qa'im, was an Islamist former Iraqi officer and the son of an Iraqi tribal sheikh of the Al-Karabla clan of the Dulaim.

== Arrest and trial ==
Al-Karbouly was captured by Jordanian 71st Counter Terrorism Battalion with the aid of Jordanian intelligence officers in May 2006, and accused of being Abu Musab al-Zarqawi's assistant which Karbouly denied. Karbouly told the tribunal that he was innocent. He also disputed the prosecution's version that he was captured inside Iraq in a joint operation of the Jordanian army and intelligence on 10 May. He told the tribunal that he had been kidnapped "from Lebanon on May 6." On 23 May 2006, he admitted that he had abducted and killed citizens from Jordan and Iraq, and had abducted two Moroccans in October 2005.

== Execution ==
Al-Karbouly was sentenced to death, and along with failed suicide bomber Sajida Mubarak Atrous al-Rishawi, was hanged on 4 February 2015, their executions expedited in retaliation for the burning of Royal Jordanian Air Force lieutenant Muath al-Kasasbeh by the Islamic State.
