= Eid Dahiyat =

Jordanian politician, critic and academic

Eid Abdallah Dahiyat

Minister of Education
- In office 24 October 2011 – 26 April 2012

Minister of Education
- In office 20 June 1991 – 20 November 1991

Minister of Sports and Youth
- In office 27 April 1986 – 10 January 1988

Personal details
- Born: 1945 (age 80–81) Shoubak, Jordan
- Education: University of North Carolina at Chapel Hill, the United States

Eid Dahiyat (Arabic: عيد الدحيات) (born 1945) is a Jordanian politician, critic and academic.

== Life and education ==
Dahiyat was born in Shoubak, Ma'an Governorate, in 1945, where he first received his elementary education. This was followed with a secondary education in the Ma'an Secondary School. Dahiyat then attended the University of Jordan, where he earned a BA in English literature, graduating in the class of 1967.

Dahiyat worked as a teaching assistant in the Department of English Literature at the University of Jordan from 1968 to 1970.

This was followed by a Fulbright scholarship to the University of North Carolina at Chapel Hill, earning his MA and PhD by 1973.

== Academic career ==
Dahiya served as a professor of English at the University of Jordan. He was promoted to dean and later vice president of the University of Jordan's academic affairs. He was founding president of Al-Ahliyya Amman University and president of Mutah University from 1997 to 2005. Dahiyat also served as the chairman of the board of trustees at Amman Arab University, Applied Science Private University and Mutah University.

Dahiyat specializes in Renaissance Literature and has written papers on the topic for American and British Research journals He is the author of 4 books in b Arabic and English.

Dahiyat is also a member of Jordanian and Arabic literary circles and associations, and is the recipient of Jordanian literary awards.

== Political career ==
Eid Dahiyat was appointed Jordan's minister of youth in Prime Minister Zaid al-Rifai's Cabinet in 1986, and Jordan's minister of education in Prime Minister Taher al-Masri's Cabinet in 1991.

More recently, he was appointed as minister of education in Prime Minister Awn Shawkat Al-Khasawneh's Cabinet formed in 2011.

He served as the deputy prime minister.

== Medals ==
Education first order, Jordan 1993.
