= List of castles in Jordan =

This is a list of fortified buildings and complexes in Jordan dating from the Roman period through much of the Ottoman period, 2nd century BCE and mainly to the 16th century CE: forts, fortresses, castles, fortified palace complexes, caravanserais, pilgrims' inns, etc.

The earliest ones listed here date to Roman times, with some being built by the Crusaders in the 12th century. Others were built by the Arab Cristian Ghassanids snd later by the various Muslim dynasties and groups, such as the Umayyads, Abbasids, Ayyubids, Mamluks, Ottomans, and local tribal leaders.

Earlier fortifications (from prehistory, the Bronze and Iron Ages and up to the Hellenistic and the Nabataean periods), as well as modern ones have bern left out

A distinct group of fortified sites are the so-called desert castles, known from the entire region but particularly well represented in Jordan. What is known in English as a "desert castle" is known in Arabic as qaṣr (singular), quṣur being the plural form (see here) and usually date to the Umayyad period. To make things complicated, not all Umayyad qasrs were built in the desert, 'qasr' may be used in Arabic for any type of fort or castle (but not in English-language academic literature), and certainly not all fortified places in the desert can be called desert castles in this sense.

== List of castles in Jordan ==
Name	Location	Picture	Notes
Ajloun Castle	Jabal Ajlun, NW Jordan		Ajloun Castle (Arabic: قلعة عجلون), transliterated: Qalʻat 'Ajloun; also Qalʻat ar-Rabad), is a 12th-century Muslim castle situated in northwestern Jordan. The castle was renovated in 1184 and it regulated traffic between Damascus and Egypt. It is placed on a hilltop surrounded by a 15-meter deep moat and had seven towers. The castle was destroyed by the Mongols in 1260, and subsequently rebuilt in the 17th century.
Aqaba Fortress	S Jordan, Gulf of Aqaba		The Aqaba Castle, Mamluk Castle or Aqaba Fort (Arabic: قلعة العقبة, romanized: Qalʿat al-ʿAqaba), located in Aqaba, is a fortress originally built in the early 16th century under the Mamluk Sultan Al-Ashraf Qansuh Al-Ghuri. Although no traces of any earlier phase remain there, it is possible that it stands at the site of a castle built by the Crusaders in the 12th century and named Helim, maybe destroyed when Ayla (medieval Aqaba) was recaptured by Saladin in 1187. The castle was captured from the Ottomans by the Arab insurgents and Lawrence of Arabia in 1917.
Kerak Castle	W Jordan, along King's Highway		Kerak Castle (Arabic: قلعة الكرك, romanized: Qal'at al-Karak) is a large Crusader castle located in al-Karak. It was built by the Crusaders in the 12th century and it is situated high on a hilltop. Construction of the castle began in the 1140s, under Pagan and Fulk, King of Jerusalem. The Crusaders called it Crac des Moabites.
Montreal (castle)	Arabah Valley		Montreal (Arabic: مونتريال; Latin: Mons Regalis, Mont Real), or Qal'at ash-Shawbak (قلعة الشوبك) in Arabic, is a castle built by the Crusaders and expanded by the Mamluks, on the eastern side of the Arabah Valley.
Qasr Al-Kharanah	Eastern Desert, SE of Amman		Qasr Kharana (Arabic: قصر خرّانة), sometimes Qasr al-Harrana, Qasr al-Kharanah, Kharaneh or Hraneh, is one of the best-known desert castles located in eastern Jordan, about 60 kilometres (37 mi) east of Amman. It is believed to have been built sometime before the early 8th century AD and consists of stone walls and large round corner towers.
Qusayr 'Amra	E Jordan		Qusayr 'Amra or Quseir Amra, lit. "small qasr of 'Amra", sometimes also named Qasr Amra (قصر عمرة / ALA-LC: Qaṣr ‘Amrah), is the best-known of the desert castles located in eastern Jordan. It was built some time between 723 and 743, by Walid Ibn Yazid, the future Umayyad caliph Walid II.
Qasr Al-Mshatta	E Jordan		Qasr Mushatta (Arabic: قصر المشتى, "Winter Palace") is the ruin of an Umayyad winter palace, probably commissioned by Caliph Al-Walid II during his reign (743-744). The castle is 144 square meters and it was used for ceremonies.
Qasr Azraq	E Jordan, Azraq Oasis, at mouth of Wadi Sirhan		Qasr al-Azraq (Arabic: قصر الأزرق, "Blue Fortress") is a large fortress located in present-day eastern Jordan. It is one of the desert castles, located on the outskirts of present-day Azraq, roughly 100 km (62 mi) east of Amman.
Qasr al-Muwaqqar and Qasr al-Mushash	Amman Governorate		Qasr al-Muwaqqar (Arabic: قصر الموقر), and Qasr al-Mushash (Arabic: قصر المشاش), were built in 723 AD, is the ruins of an Umayyad complex, the Qasr al-Muwaqqar, a qasr-type fortified palace also known as a desert castle. The original castles are mostly destroyed.
Qasr Bayir	central Eastern Desert		Qasr Bayir (Arabic: قصر بيير), was constructed in 743 AD by Al-Walid II. Located in the desert of Jordan, it was destroyed in 1931.
Qasr Bshir	S of Amman, W of Desert Highway		Qasr Bshir (Arabic: قصر بشير; Latin: Castra Praetorii Mobeni) is an ancient Roman fort isolated in an area of the desert rippled with shallow valleys that drain into the Wadi Mujib river.
Qasr Burqu'	NE Jordan		Qasr Burqu' (Arabic: قصر برق) is a set of ruins, an archaeological site in the badia of eastern Jordan, and is the site of one of the earliest Umayyad desert castles.
Qasr al-Qatraneh	central Jordan, along Syrian Hajj route		Qasr Al-Qatraneh (Arabic: قلعة القطرانة); alternatively: "Qatraneh" or "Qatrana Castle," "Fortress Qatrana," or "Khan Qatraneh") is an Ottoman structure which largely served to provide water and protection on the Syrian pilgrimage route between the Levant and the Gulf. It is located in Jordan.
Qasr Tuba	E Jordan, Amman Governorate		Qasr at-Tuba (Arabic: قصر طوبا) is the southernmost of the Umayyad desert castles in Jordan. Built in 743 CE by Caliph al-Walid II for his sons, al-Hakam and ‘Uthman,
Vaux Moise (Wu'ayra Castle)	Wadi Musa, SW Jordan		Vaux Moise, (Arabic: فو مويس), also Li Vaux Moise or Alwaeira Castle (The Valley of Moses) is a small crusader castle close to Wadi Musa in Jordan. It was founded by Baldwin I of Jerusalem as an outpost of the larger crusader castle at Montreal.
Dab‘ah Castle	S of Amman Int'l Airport, along Syrian Hajj route		Dab‘ah Castle (Arabic: قلعة ضبعة)
Tafilah Castle	SW Jordan		Tafilah Castle (Arabic: قلعة الطفيلة)
Unayzah, Jordan	SW Jordan, along Syrian Hajj route		Unayzah, Jordan(Arabic: عنيزة، الأردن)
As-Salt Castle	NW Jordan, Balqa highland		As-Salt Castle(Arabic: قلعة السلط)

== See also ==
- Jordan's desert castles
- List of Crusader castles

Map for castle locations
Castles of Jordan
