= Wu'ayra Castle =

Ruined Crusader castle near Petra, Jordan

li Vaux Moysi فو مويس
- Wadi Musa, Jordan
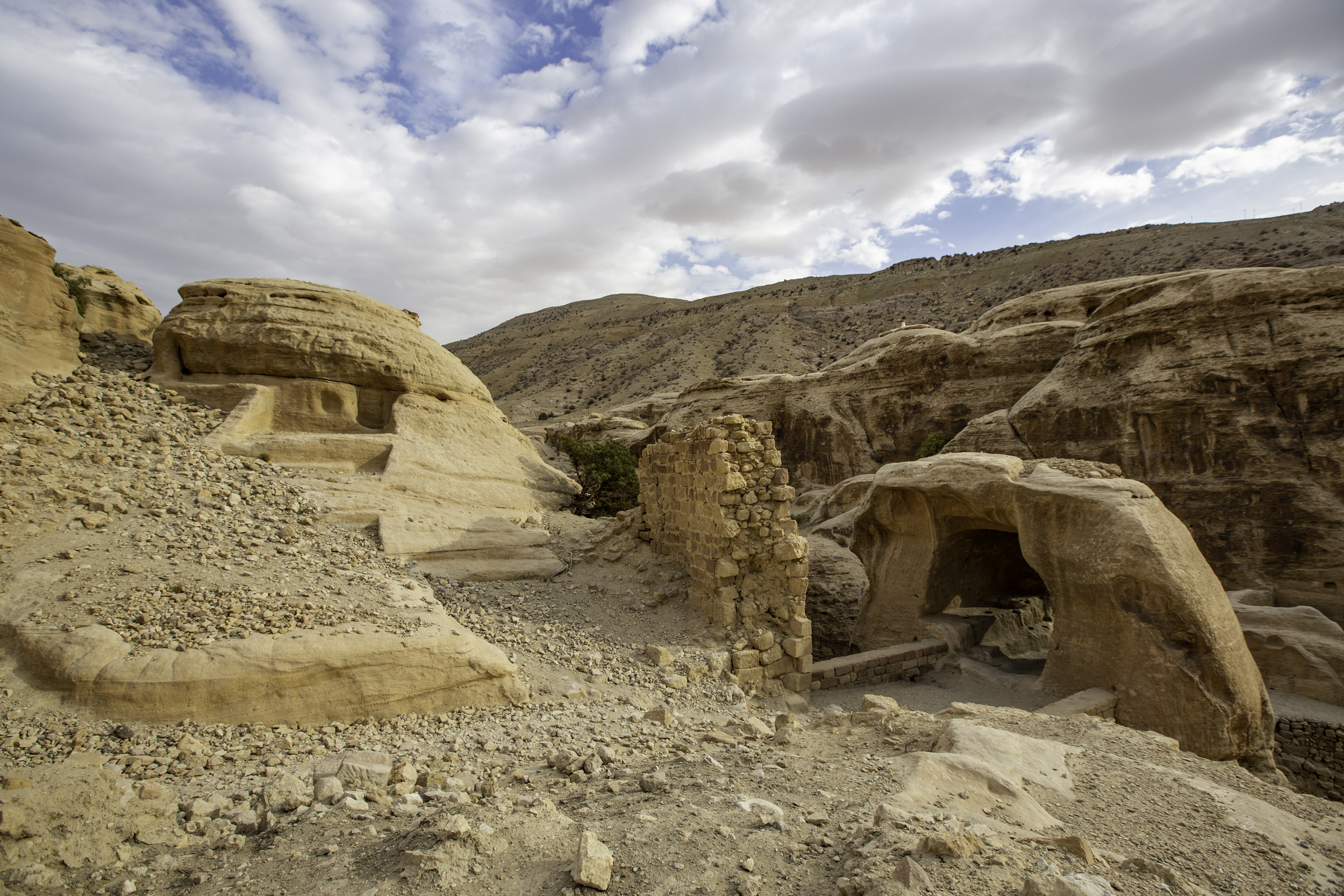
- Wu'ayra Castle, the gatehouse (right)

Site information
- Type: Castle

Location
- Location within Jordan
- Coordinates: 30.333056°N 35.465833°E

Site history
- Built by: Baldwin I of Jerusalem

Wu'ayra Castle is a ruined Crusader castle located in Wadi Musa, Jordan, 1 kilometre (0.62 mi) north of the main entrance to Petra. It was founded by Baldwin I of Jerusalem as an outpost of the larger Montreal Castle, which stands about 34 kilometres (21 mi) north of it at Shoubak. The area is extremely rugged and difficult to access. The site rises about 1,050 metres (3,440 ft) above sea level and is surrounded by a natural valley.

It was conquered by the Ayyubids in 1188.

== Name ==
The name given to the castle by its Crusader builders was Castellum Vallis Moysis or li Vaux Moysi, both meaning "[Castle of] Moses Valley" in Medieval Latin and Old French, respectively, mirroring the name of the valley, Wadi Musa in Arabic.

The Arabic name is spelled al-Wu'aira or al-Wu'ayra.

== History ==
During their rule, the Crusaders built several castles and forts from Antioch in the north, to Karak, Montreal (Shawbak), and the Petra region to the south. At Petra, Baldwin I, king of the Latin Kingdom of Jerusalem, built the fortress of Al-Wua'yra to be able to control the area extending southeast of the Dead Sea. This allowed him to control the commercial, military and Muslim pilgrimage roads between the Levant, Egypt, and the Hijaz. The forces of Sultan Saladin (Salah ad-Din) conquered the castle in AD 1188, shortly after also taking Montreal Castle. Yaqut al-Hamawi mentioned the castle in his 1220s "Geography" (Mu’jam Al-Buldan, lit. 'Dictionary of Countries'). The castle was then deserted and was only known to the inhabitants of the area.

== Description ==
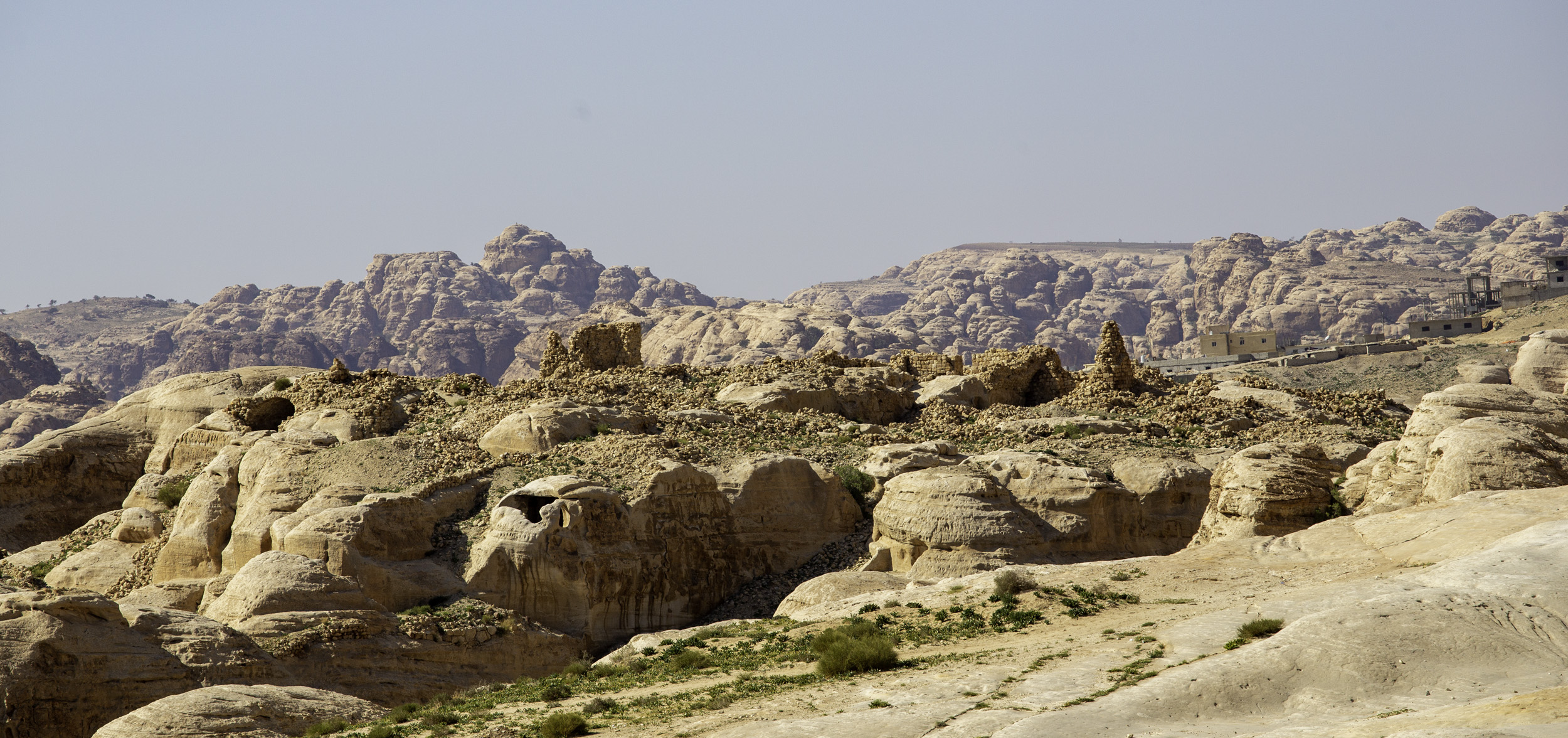
Castle ruins and village of Umm Sayhoun

Wu'ayra is a small spur castle on a narrow ridge with smooth sides. Its military effectiveness is due more to its remote and inaccessible location than impressive fortifications. Its most remarkable architectural feature is a gatehouse excavated from solid rock guarding the bridge to the entrance.

Although the building is largely ruined, it can be described from existing remains and foundations. Where the rectangular castle is surrounded by a wall with a tower on the northeastern side and its entrance on the south side. The area of the tower from the inside is 4 x 5 m. It is surmounted by a barrel barrel and in the eastern wall, it has a fluency, that is, a gap for arrows, 120 cm long and 15 cm wide. In the northwestern corner of the castle there are the remains of a church built on a single hall system measuring 13 m by 6 m. A room is connected to it from the eastern side. There is another tower in the western wall. Fences, towers and the church were built of small stones whose dimensions are 40 cm x 30 cm. They are not precisely carved and do not have a lot of homogeneity in terms of how they were carved.

Wu'ayra Castle is a significant cultural landmark that welcomes people from all over the world. It provides a window into the past and aids tourists in comprehending the background of the area.

Wu'ayra Castle may be seen as architectually significant, as it is an example of early Islamic architecture and provides information about that era's construction methods. Wu'ayra Castle is a tourist destination in Jordan.

== See also ==
- Islamic architecture
- List of castles in Jordan
- Umayyad architecture

== Bibliography ==
- Al-Nasarat, Mohammed; Al-Maani, Abd alrzaq (2014). "Petra During the Crusader Period from the Evidence of Al-Wuayra Castle: A Review" (PDF). Mediterranean Archaeology and Archaeometry. 14 (1). The University of the Aegean, Greece: 221–234 [226].
- Kennedy, Hugh (1994). Crusader Castles. Cambridge University Press. pp. 25 ff. ISBN 0521799139.
- Pringle, Denys (1997). al-Wu'aira (No. 230). Cambridge University Press. pp. 105–106. ISBN 9780521460101.
- Pringle, Denys (1998). Wadi Musa. Vol. II, L-Z (exluding Tyre). Cambridge University Press. pp. 373–376. ISBN 0-521-39037-0.
