= Unayzah, Jordan =

Unayzah
- Qasr Uneizah
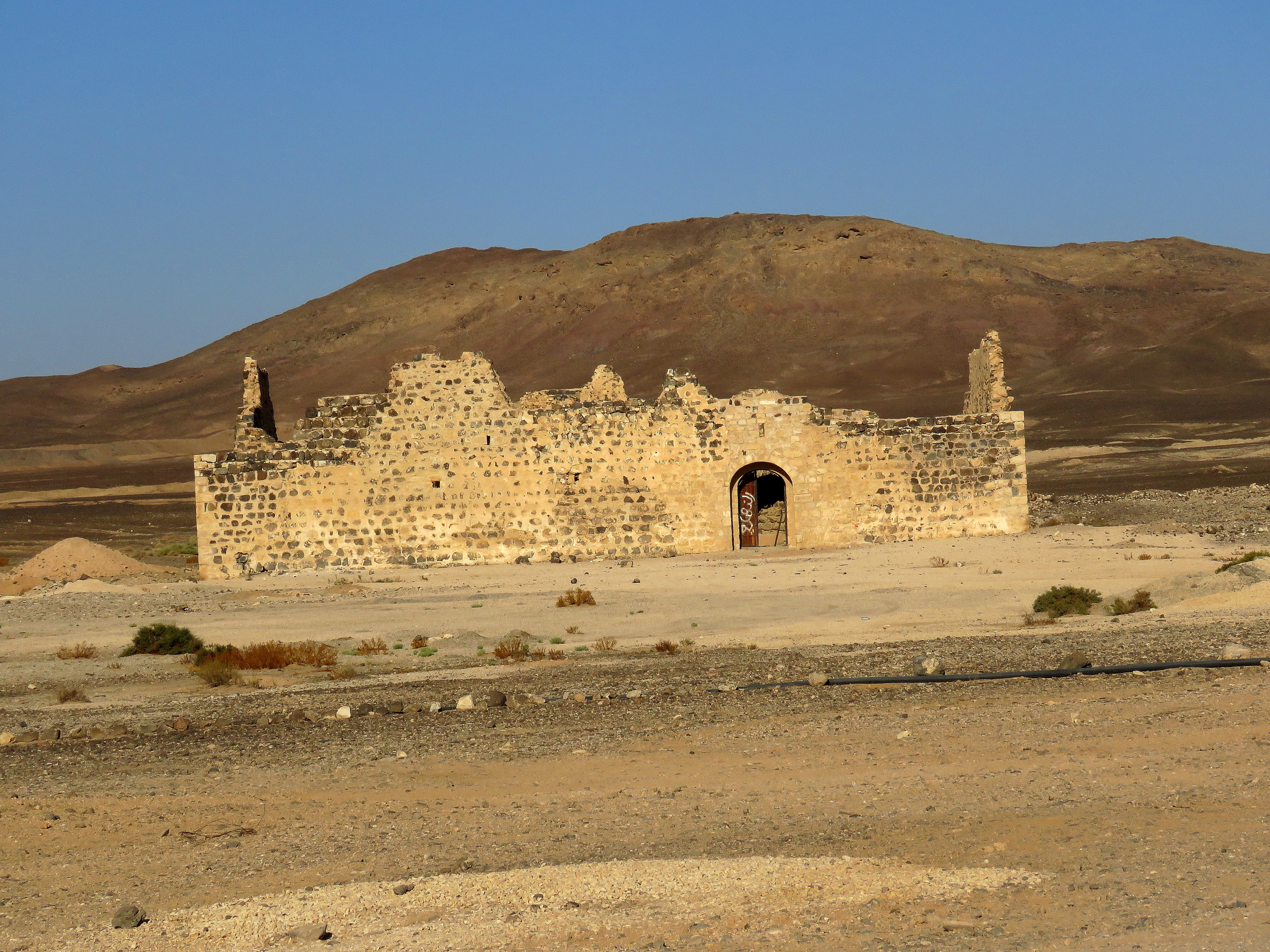
- Qasr Uneizah

General information
- Type: Castle
- Architectural style: Islamic
- Location: Ma'an Governorate, Jordan
- Coordinates: 30.4882°N 35.7954°E
- Completed: 16th century
- Owner: Jordanian Ministry of Antiquities

Uneizah, or Qasr Uneizah, (Arabic: قصر عنيزة) is a historical site located in Al-Husseiniya District in the Ma'an Governorate of Jordan, about 36 kilometers north of the city of Ma'an along the Amman–Aqaba desert highway.

== Geography ==
Uneizah rises to an elevation of about 1,000 meters above sea level.

== Name ==
It was named after the nearby mountain Jabal Uneizah, which is known for its black volcanic stone.

== Landmarks ==
- Uneizah Castle, a 16th-century Ottoman fortress built during the reign of Sultan Suleiman the Magnificent to protect pilgrims traveling along the Syrian Hajj route
- A Hejaz Railway station, historical building
- A water reservoir (water cistern)
- Jabal Uneizah, the nearby mountain

== See also ==
- List of castles in Jordan
- Desert castles
- Jordanian art
- Jordan's desert castles
