= Al-Betrā' =

Governorate of Jordan

Coordinates: 30.27565°N 35.46726°E

- District
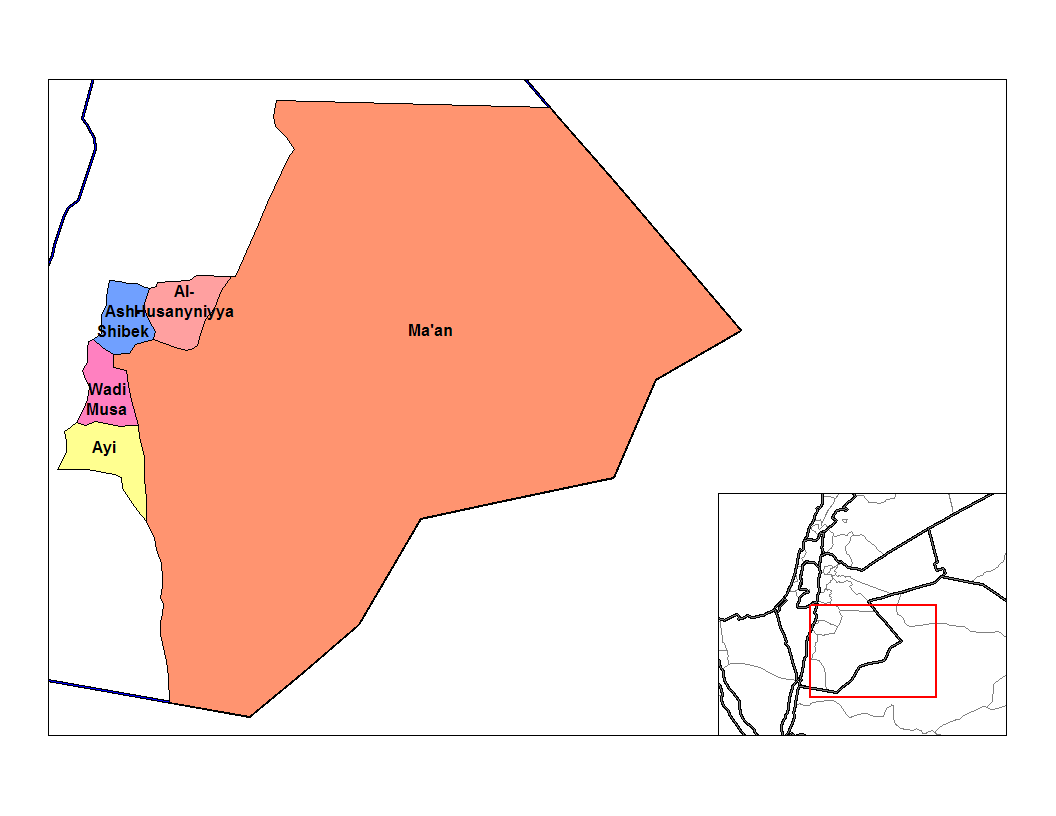
- Interactive map of Al-Betrā'
- Country: Jordan
- Governorate: Ma'an

Area
  - Total: 239.9 km^{2} (92.6 sq mi)

Population (2015 census)
  - Total: 19,828
  - Density: 82.65/km^{2} (214.1/sq mi)
- Time zone: GMT +2
  - Summer (DST): +3

Al-Betrā' (Arabic: البتراء) is one of the districts of Ma'an governorate, Jordan. It is about 35 kilometres (22 mi) west of the city of Ma'an.
