= Qasr Bayir =

Fortified building in Jordan

Qasr Bayir قصر بيير
- Jordan

Site information
- Type: Desert castle
- Condition: Ruins

Location
- Coordinates: 30.761944°N 36.679167°E

Site history
- Built: 743 CE
- Built by: Al-Walid II
- Materials: Stone

Qasr Bayir (Arabic: قصر بيير) is a desert castle built in 743 CE by Prince Walid bin Yazid. Located in the desert of Jordan, it was destroyed in 1931.

== History ==
In 743, during the Umayyad period, the future caliph Al-Walid II had the castle built in what is today the Jordanian badiya (desert). The structure was 70 meters long and was built of large sandstone blocks. It was destroyed in 1931 by Beake Pasha and the stone blocks were used to construct an Arab Legion outpost.

== See also ==
- List of castles in Jordan
