= Dab'ah Castle =

- قلعة ضبعة
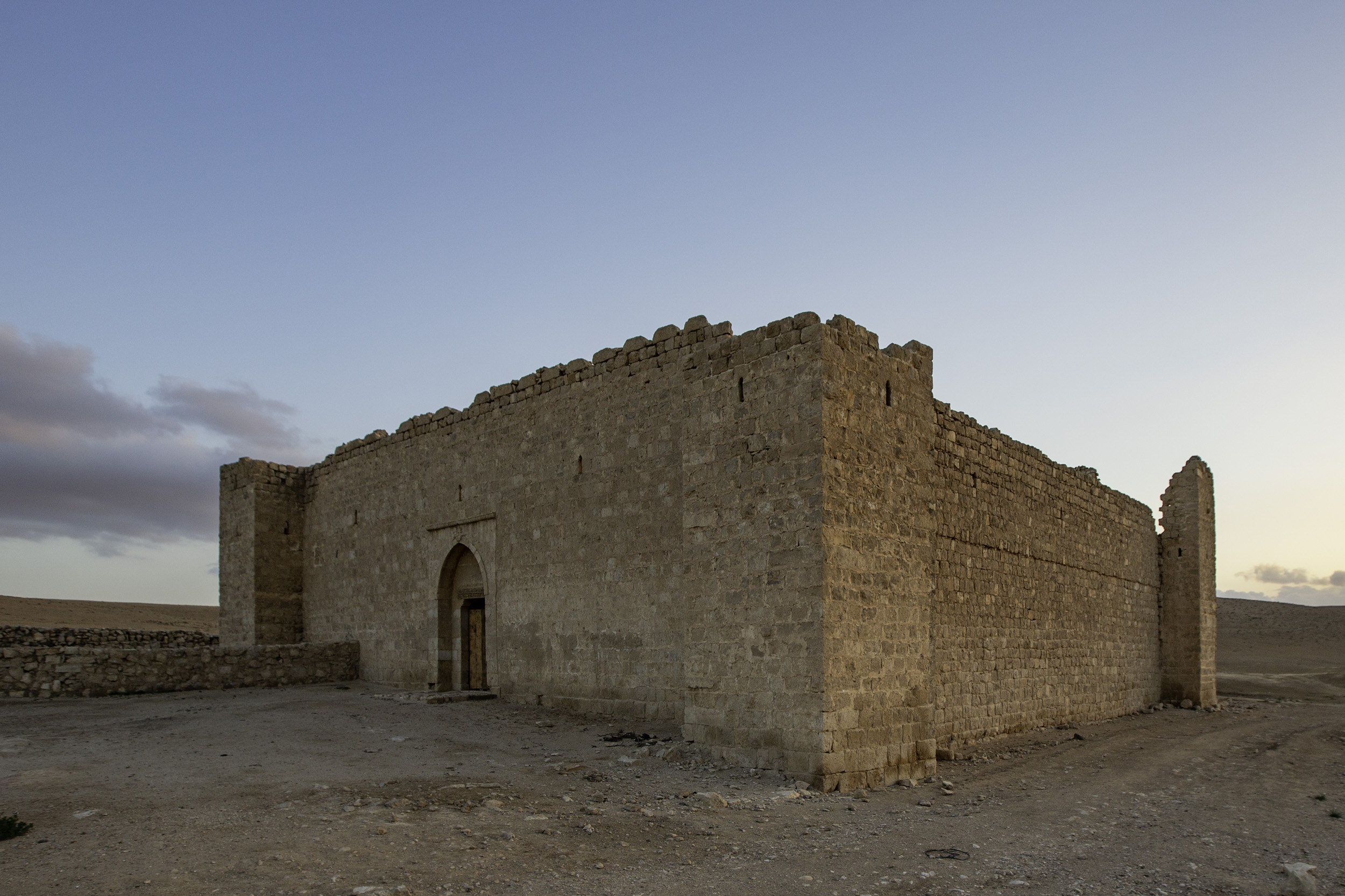
- Dab'ah Palace

General information
- Type: Ottoman pilgrim fort
- Architectural style: Islamic
- Location: Amman Governorate, Jordan, Al-Jizah
- Completed: 16th century
- Owner: Jordanian Ministry of Antiquities

Technical details
- Floor count: 2 (ground floor and upper floor)

Qasr Dab'ah (Arabic: قلعة ضبعة, lit. Dab'ah Castle or Dab'ah Palace) is one of the Ottoman pilgrim forts built along the Syrian Hajj route in what is today Jordan. It is located southeast of Amman and few kilometres south of Amman International Airport on the Desert Highway.

== History ==
Its construction dates back to the Ottoman period in the 16th century, during the reign of Sultan Suleiman the Magnificent (r. 1520–1566).

== Significance ==
Its construction helped protect and secure the Syrian Hajj route, which passed through the area, and served as a point for providing pilgrims with food and water.

== Architecture ==
- The castle was built of limestone and basalt.
- It consists of two floors and has four towers at its corners.
- It includes a water collection system, with two large pools for storing rainwater and a well in the inner courtyard.

== See also ==
- Desert castles
- Jordanian art
- List of castles in Jordan
