= Husseiniya, Jordan =

Governorate of Jordan

Husseiniya Husseiniyeh Al-Huseiniyah Al-Husainya
- District
- الحسينية
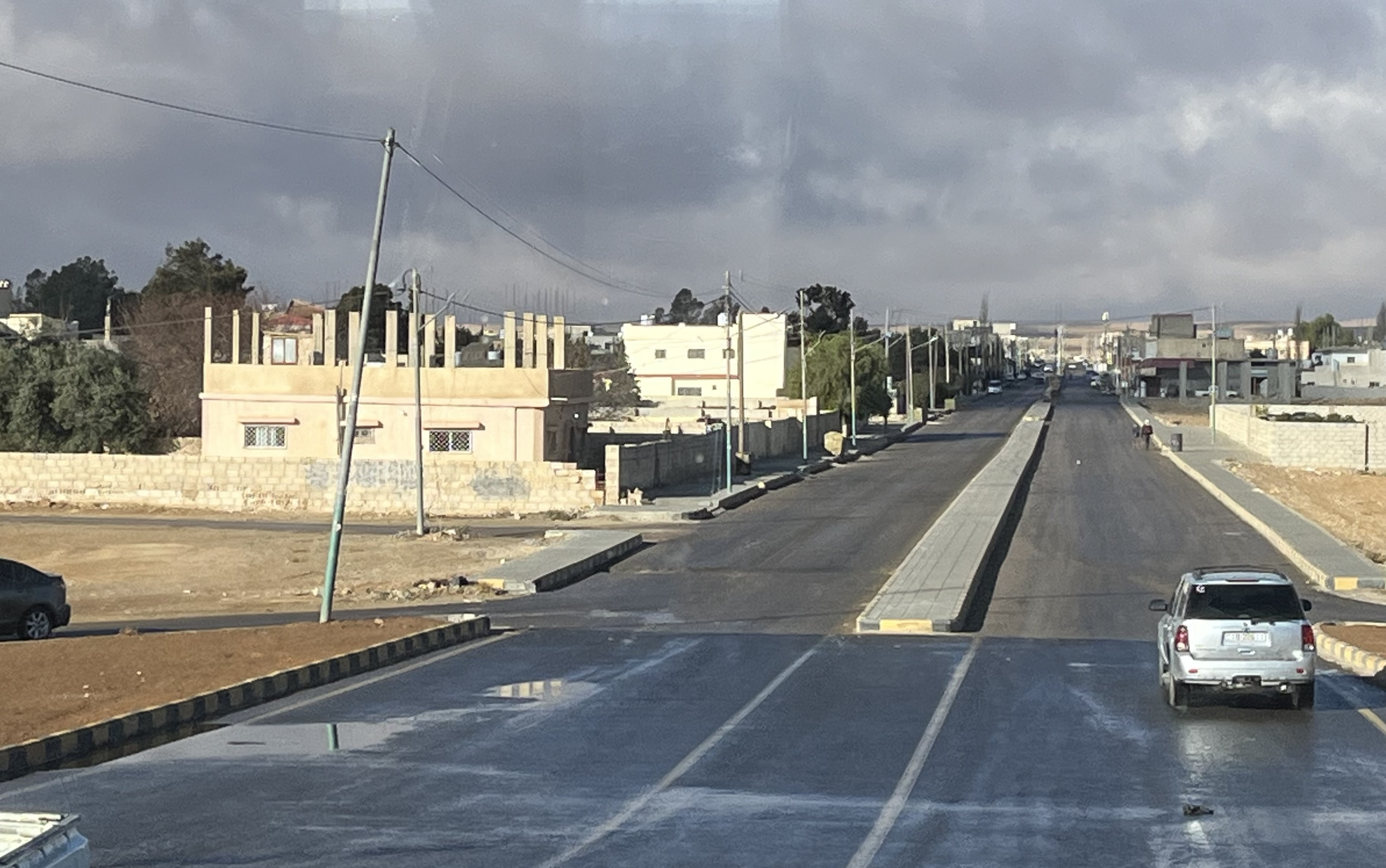

- Location within Jordan
- Country: Jordan
- Governorate: Ma'an

Area
  - Total: 527.6 km^{2} (203.7 sq mi)

Population (2015 census)
  - Total: 17,323
  - Density: 32.83/km^{2} (85.04/sq mi)
- Time zone: GMT +2
  - Summer (DST): +3

Husseiniya, Husseiniyeh, Al-Huseiniyah or Al-Husainya (Arabic: الحسينية, romanized: Al-Ḥusaynīyah) is one of the districts of Ma'an governorate, Jordan. It is named after the Islamic figure of Husayn.

== See also ==
- Hejaz Railway, which had a station at Uneiza in this district
- History of the Hajj: Syrian route, which had a stop at the Qal'at 'Unaiza fort in this district
