= Tafilah Castle =

- قلعة الطفيلة
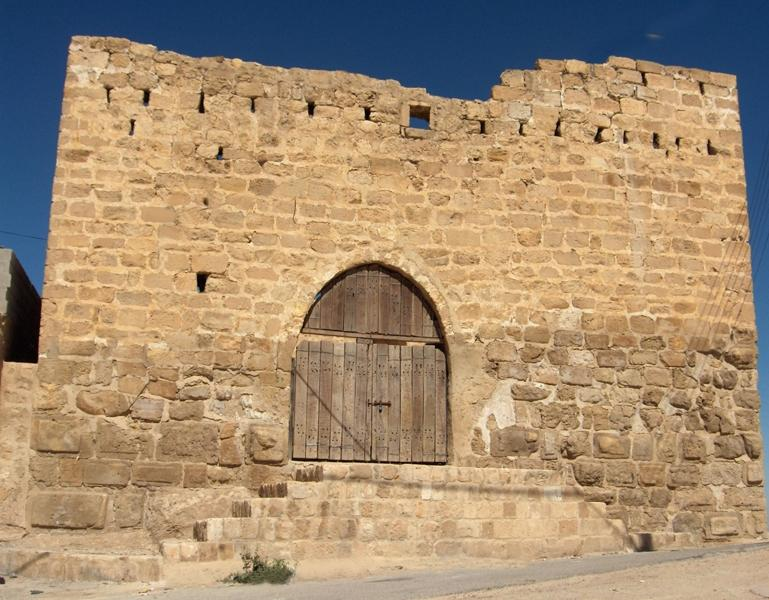
- Tafilah Castle
- Interactive map of the Tafilah Castle area

General information
- Type: Castle
- Architectural style: Islamic
- Location: Jordan, Tafilah
- Owner: Jordanian Ministry of Antiquities

Tafilah Castle (Arabic: قلعة الطفيلة) is a historical fortress located in the city of Tafilah in southern Jordan.

== History ==
It is situated on a hill overlooking ancient trade routes. Its origins date back to the Edomite period, and it was renovated and fortified during the Nabatean and Roman eras.

== Architecture ==
- Its current form dates to the Islamic period, particularly the Ayyubid and Mamluk eras.
- The castle is characterized by its military nature, featuring watchtowers and the remains of defensive rooms.

== See also ==
- List of castles in Jordan
- Desert castles
- Jordanian art
- Jordan's desert castles
