= As-Salt Castle =

- قلعة السلط
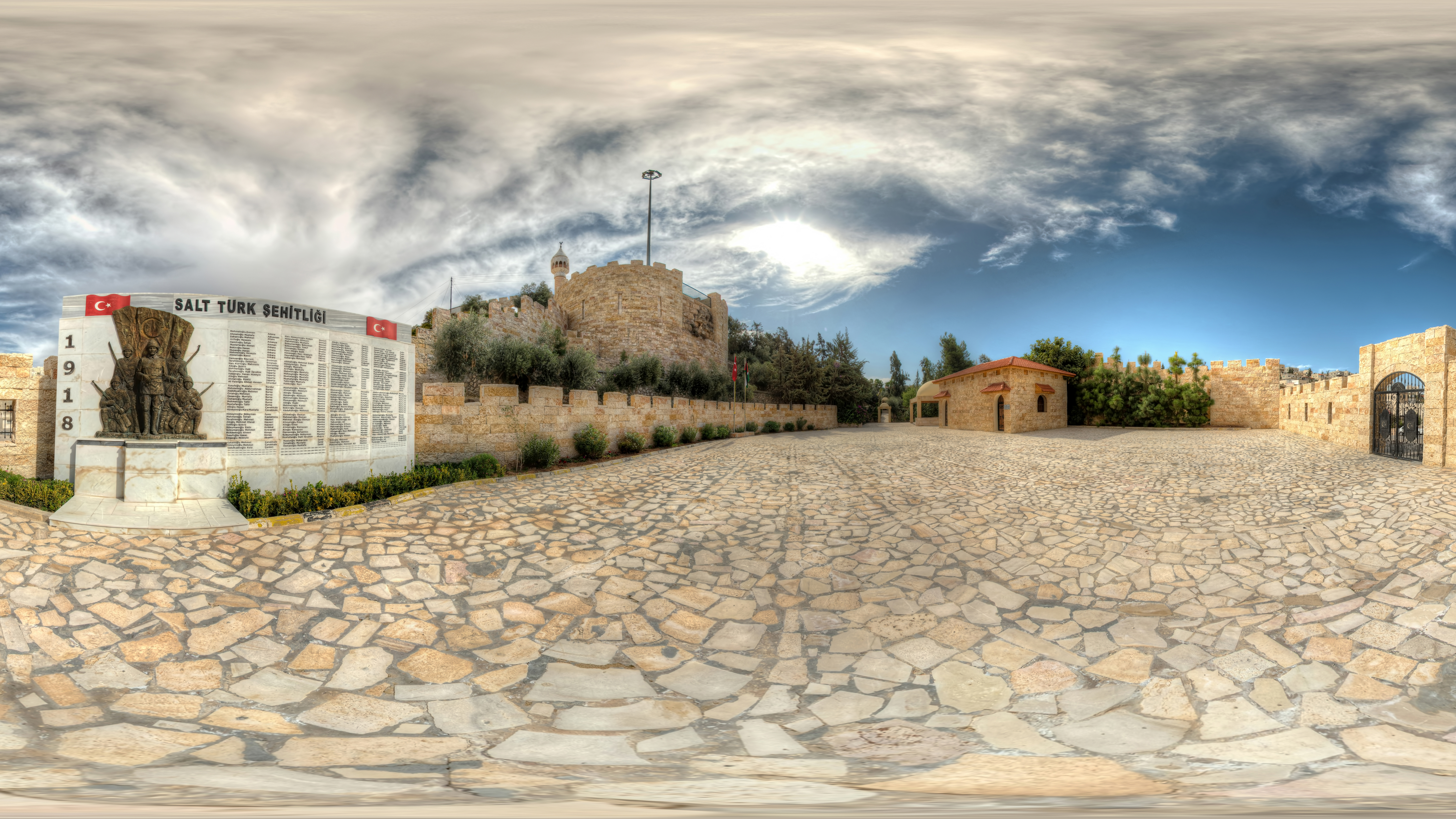
- As-Salt Castle

General information
- Type: Castle
- Architectural style: Islamic
- Location: Jordan, Balqa Governorate, As-Salt
- Owner: Jordanian Ministry of Antiquities

As-Salt Castle (Arabic: قلعة السلط) is an archaeological site located in the city of As-Salt in the Balqa Governorate of Jordan. The castle is considered one of the most significant historical landmarks in the city.

== History ==
The castle was built in AD 1220 (AH 616) during the Ayyubid period by Emir Isa ibn al-Adil, a member of the Ayyubid dynasty and the nephew of Sultan Saladin. It was constructed as a defensive fortress to protect the region and control the main passage routes in the Balqa area.

== Architecture ==
The castle has a rectangular layout, and remnants of its stone walls remain, some of which rise to approximately six meters. The structure once included defensive towers and internal facilities, among them a small mosque.

== Significance ==
As-Salt Castle represents one of the most prominent examples of Ayyubid defensive architecture in Jordan. It stands as a heritage landmark reflecting the urban and military development of the region over the centuries. The site is also an important destination for researchers and those interested in Jordanian history and cultural heritage.

== See also ==
- List of castles in Jordan
- Desert castles
- Jordanian art
