= Qaṣabah Ma'ān =

Governorate of Jordan

- District
- Location within Jordan
- Coordinates: 30.33105°N 36.63777°E
- Country: Jordan
- Governorate: Ma'an

Area
  - Total: 31,680 km^{2} (12,230 sq mi)

Population (2015 census)
  - Total: 87,652
  - Density: 2.767/km^{2} (7.166/sq mi)
- Time zone: GMT +2
  - Summer (DST): +3

Qaṣabah Ma'ān is one of the districts of Ma'an governorate, Jordan.
