= Shoubak =

Shoubak الشوبك
- Town
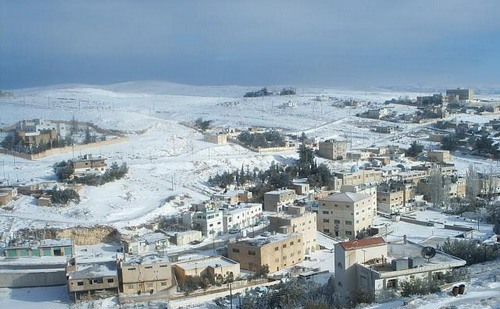

- Location within Jordan
- Coordinates: 30°31′08″N 35°33′28″E
- PAL: 205/993
- Country: Jordan
- Province: Ma'an Governorate
- Municipality established: 2001

Government
  - Type: Municipality
  - Mayor: Adel Al-Rafayah

Area
  - Metro: 15 km^{2} (5.8 sq mi)
- Elevation: 1,330 m (4,360 ft)

Population (2015)
  - Town: 4,275
  - Metro: 19,279
- Time zone: GMT +2
  - Summer (DST): +3
- Area code: +(962)3

Shoubak (Arabic: الشوبك) is a municipality that lies at the northwestern edge of the Ma'an Governorate in Jordan. It had a population of 19,297. At one of the highest elevations above sea level in Jordan, this municipality is famous for apple and fruit farms. The Crusader castle Montreal is located in Shoubak.

== History ==
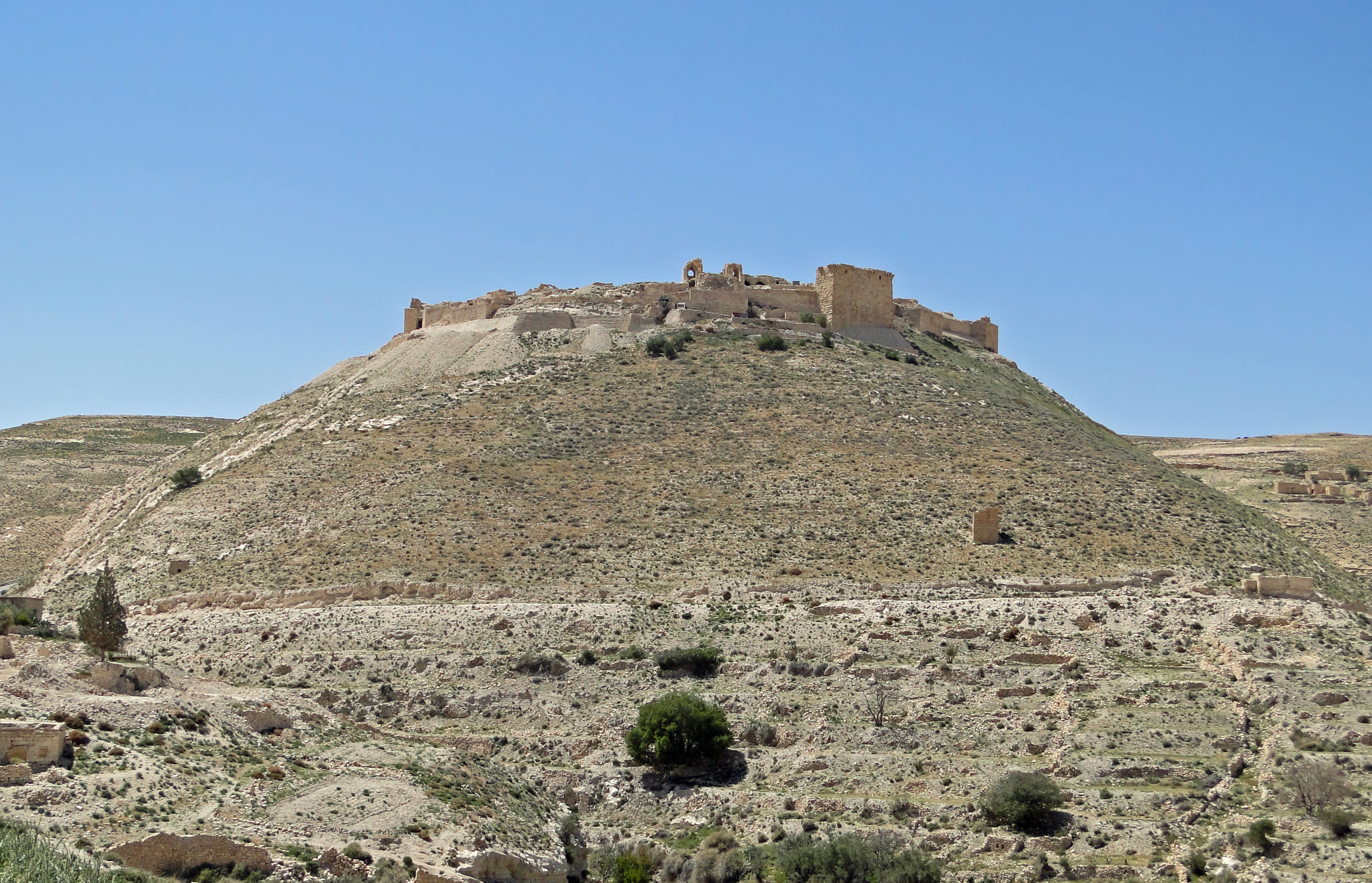
The Crusader castle Montréal in Shoubak.

=== Antiquity and Middle Ages ===
Shoubak was first settled by the Edomites who had their capital in Busaira in neighboring Tafilah Governorate, in the second millennium BC. It was then settled by the Nabataeans in the first millennium BC.

Shoubak is known for its Crusader castle Montreal. Along with Petra and Aqaba, Shoubak forms the third head of this triangle that lies on the cross road between Syria, Saudi Arabia and Egypt. Its unique high elevation (1330 m above sea level) gave it a strategic importance.

The importance of Shoubak reached its peak after Baldwin I of Jerusalem took control. The Montreal castle was built on top of a hill in 1115. Shoubak was annexed to the Ayyubid dynasty by Saladin in 1187. In the early 16th century, the Arab Christian community migrated to Gaza which became the largest Christian center in Palestine.

In 1596 it appeared in the Ottoman tax registers under the name of Sawbak, situated in the nahiya (subdistrict) of Sawbak, part of the Sanjak of Ajlun. It had 65 households who were Muslim, in addition to 5 Christian households. They paid taxes on various agricultural products, including wheat (5500 a.), barley (2000 a.), vineyards/fruit trees (1000 a.), goats and bee-hives (1800 a.); in addition to occasional revenues (1000 a.) and a water mill (120 a.). Their total tax was 14,000 akçe.

Shoubak became a nahia in 1894, and administratively belonged to the Ottoman Kerak department.

=== Modern history ===
The city of Shoubak revolted against the Ottomans in 1900 and in 1905. During the Arab Revolt, T. E. Lawrence entered Shoubak in Feb. 1918, commenting, "We went over the ridge and down to the base of the shapely cone, whose mural crown was the ring-wall of the old castle of Monreale, very noble against the night sky." Upon departure, he wrote, "...we skated timorously down the rapid path to the open plain across which still stretched the Roman road with its groups of fallen milestones, inscribed by famous emperors."

In 1961, there were 4,634 inhabitants in Shaubak.

In 1973, it was ranked up to a qadaa. In the 31st Administrative Divisions System of 1995, Shoubak became a full department within Ma'an Governorate benefiting from the decentralization program.

== Geography ==
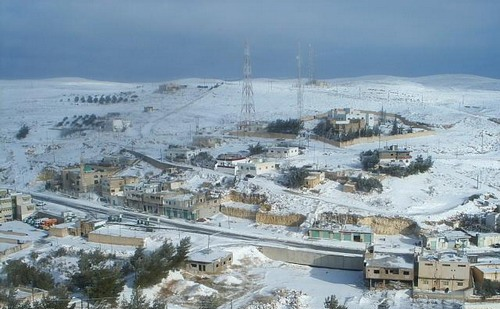
Shoubak is known for its cold winters.

Shoubak is located at an area bordering Tafilah Governorate to the north and Aqaba Governorate to the west. It is administratively in Ma'an Governorate. Due to its high elevation, Shoubak experiences freezing winters, but the summer season is dry due its proximity to the Arabian Desert.

The Köppen-Geiger climate classification is Csb, but very close to Dsa and BSk. The average annual temperature in Shoubak is 12.7 °C (54.9 °F). About 317 mm (12.48 in) of precipitation falls annually.

== Climate ==
Climate data for Shoubak, elevation 1,300 m (4,300 ft)
| Month | Jan | Feb | Mar | Apr | May | Jun | Jul | Aug | Sep | Oct | Nov | Dec | Year |
|---|---|---|---|---|---|---|---|---|---|---|---|---|---|
| Mean daily maximum °C (°F) | 9.1 (48.4) | 10.3 (50.5) | 14.3 (57.7) | 19.0 (66.2) | 22.5 (72.5) | 26.5 (79.7) | 27.5 (81.5) | 28.3 (82.9) | 25.9 (78.6) | 22.7 (72.9) | 17.1 (62.8) | 12.2 (54.0) | 19.6 (67.3) |
| Daily mean °C (°F) | 6.2 (43.2) | 8.7 (47.7) | 12.5 (54.5) | 14.1 (57.4) | 20.8 (69.4) | 22.6 (72.7) | 24.1 (75.4) | 23.9 (75.0) | 21.8 (71.2) | 19.5 (67.1) | 13.3 (55.9) | 9.4 (48.9) | 16.4 (61.5) |
| Mean daily minimum °C (°F) | 0.3 (32.5) | 0.3 (32.5) | 2.7 (36.9) | 5.4 (41.7) | 7.3 (45.1) | 10.1 (50.2) | 12.6 (54.7) | 13.5 (56.3) | 10.0 (50.0) | 8.4 (47.1) | 5.2 (41.4) | 1.5 (34.7) | 6.4 (43.6) |
| Average rainfall mm (inches) | 72 (2.8) | 62 (2.4) | 41 (1.6) | 29 (1.1) | 5 (0.2) | 1 (0.0) | 0 (0) | 0 (0) | 0 (0) | 4 (0.2) | 41 (1.6) | 57 (2.2) | 312 (12.3) |
| Average relative humidity (%) | 70 | 67 | 61 | 50 | 41 | 38 | 42 | 52 | 64 | 62 | 55 | 68 | 56 |
Source: Arab Meteorology Book

== Demographics ==
The national census of 2004 showed that the total population of Shoubak was 12,590 persons, of whom 5,666 are males (45%) and 6924 are females, constituting 55% of the total population. There were 1,663 households with an average of 5 persons/household. Almost the entire population is Muslim.

== Economy ==
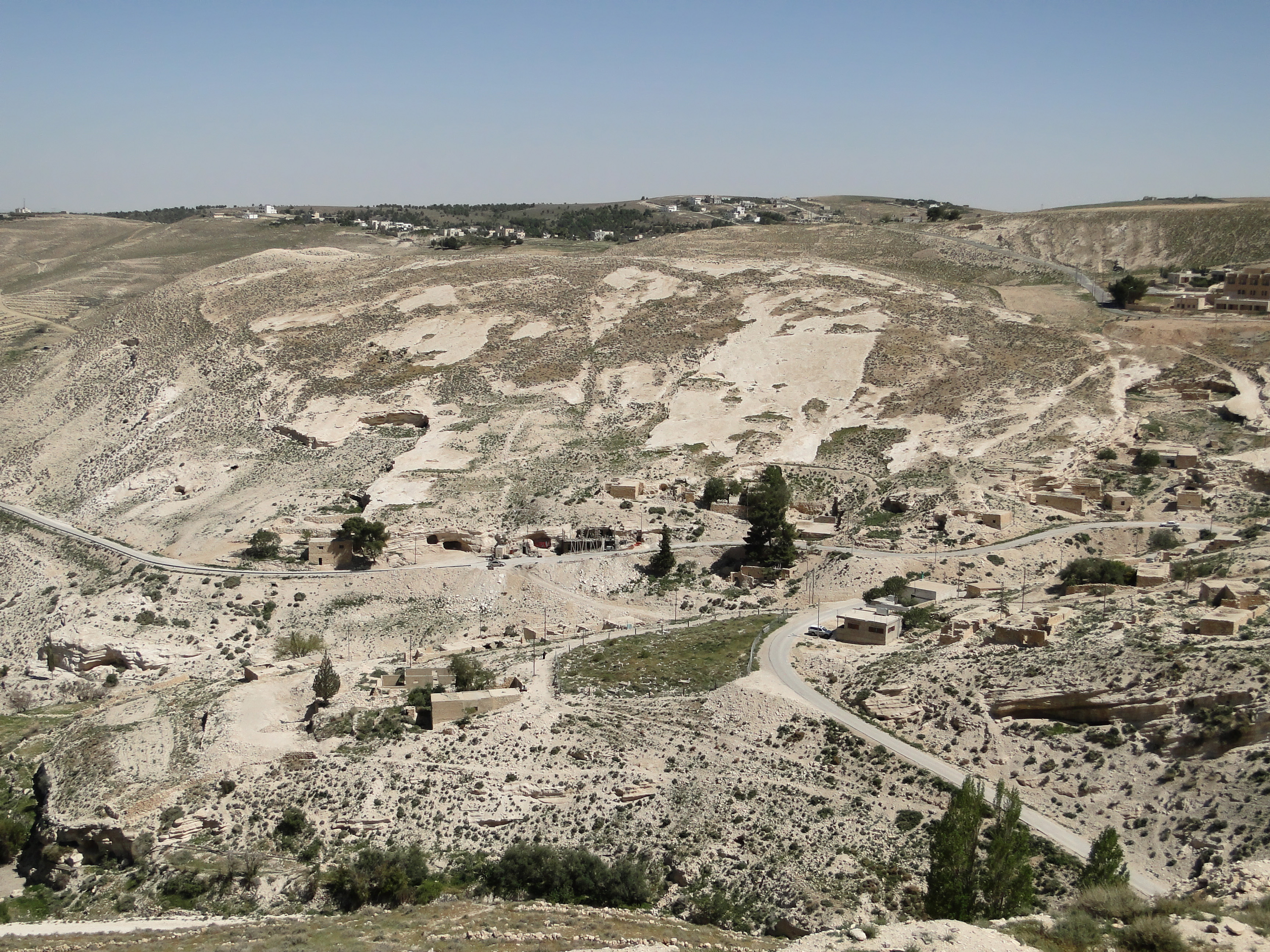
View from the Montreal castle.

Agriculture forms the major source of income for Shoubak, followed by tourism. Benefiting from its high altitude of more than 1,300 m above sea level, the countryside of Shoubak extends to about 189 km^{2} of olive, vegetable and fruit farms, mainly apple farms surrounding and within the town of Shoubak, resulting in the city spanning a relatively large area. There are 129 honey bee farms in the town's countryside, making it a major producer of honey.

== Education ==
The college of agriculture of Al-Balqa` Applied University is located in Shoubak. The Regional Center of Agricultural Research and Technology Transport is also located in Shoubak.

== Notable people ==
- Eid Dahiyat, Minister of Education
- Taha Ali Al-Habahbeh, Minister of State.

== Bibliography ==
- Government of Jordan, Department of Statistics (1964). First Census of Population and Housing. Volume I: Final Tables; General Characteristics of the Population (PDF).
- Hütteroth, W.-D.; Abdulfattah, K. (1977). Historical Geography of Palestine, Transjordan and Southern Syria in the Late 16th Century. Erlanger Geographische Arbeiten, Sonderband 5. Erlangen, Germany: Vorstand der Fränkischen Geographischen Gesellschaft. ISBN 3-920405-41-2.
