= Montreal (castle) =

12th-century Crusader castle in Shoubak, Jordan

Montreal Castle
- قلعة مونتريال
- Shoubak, Jordan
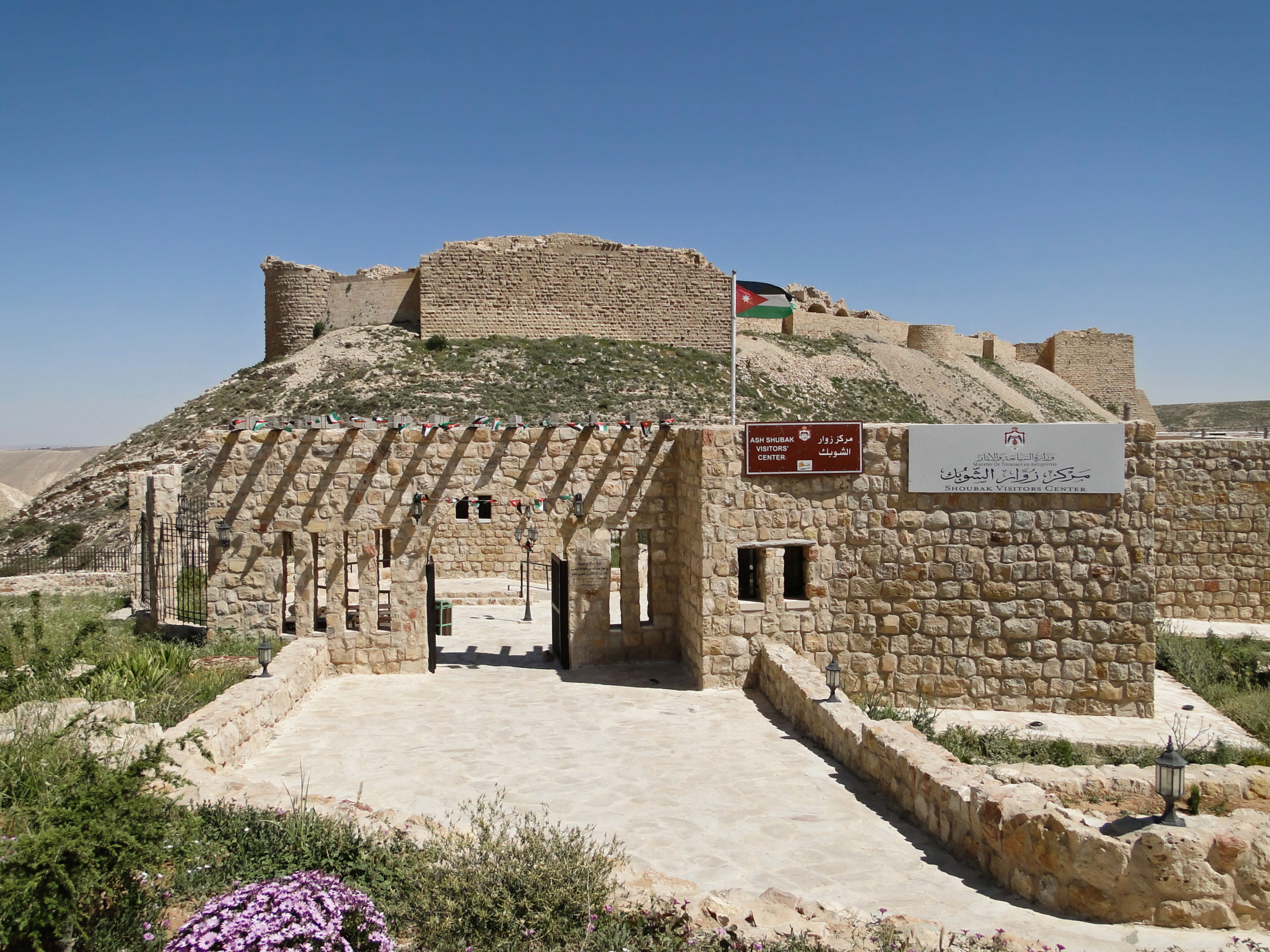
- Montreal Castle and the Shoubak visitor Center

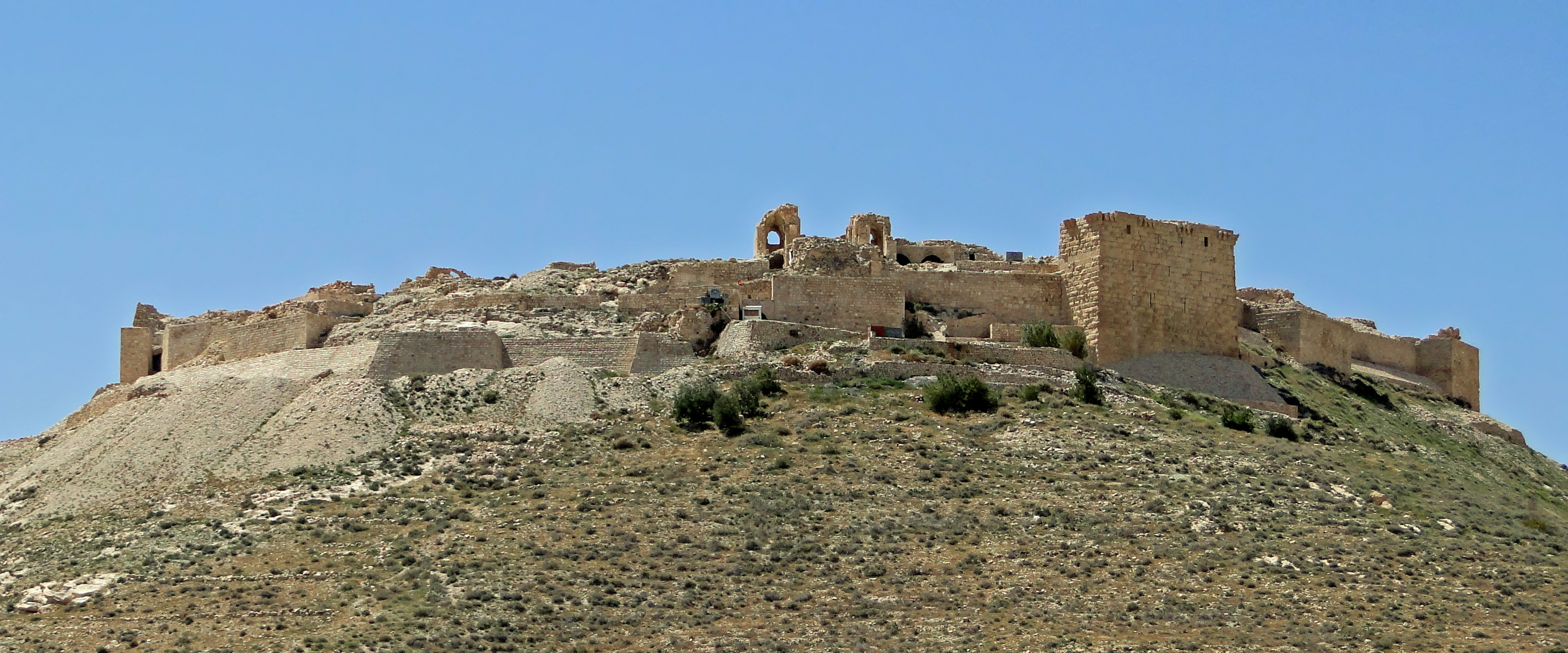
- Montreal Crusader Castle

Site information
- Open to the public: Yes

Location
- Location within Jordan
- Coordinates: 30.5313°N 35.5600°E

Site history
- Built: 1115
- Built by: Baldwin I of Jerusalem

Montreal (Arabic: مونتريال; Latin: Mons Regalis, Mont Real), or Qal'at ash-Shawbak (قلعة الشوبك) in Arabic, is a castle built by the Crusaders and expanded by the Mamluks, nestled amid the mountains of Edom just east of the Arabah Valley, perched on the side of a rocky, conical mountain, looking out over fruit orchards below. The ruins are located next to the modern town of Shoubak in Jordan.

== Name ==
The Crusaders, who wrote their chronicles in Medieval Latin, Old French and Occitan, mentioned the castle as Castrum Saboach or Scobach, or as Mons Regalis, Mont Real, and Monreal. The second set of variants translate to 'Royal Castle' or 'King's Castle'.

The Arabic name is spelled variously as Shobak, Shawbak, Shaubak, Shubek, etc. The word castle or fortress translates in Arabic to qal'a.

== Excavation history ==
As late as the end of the 20th century, the castle had never yet been fully excavated, but as of 2006 it was being investigated by an Italian archaeological team from the University of Florence.

== History ==
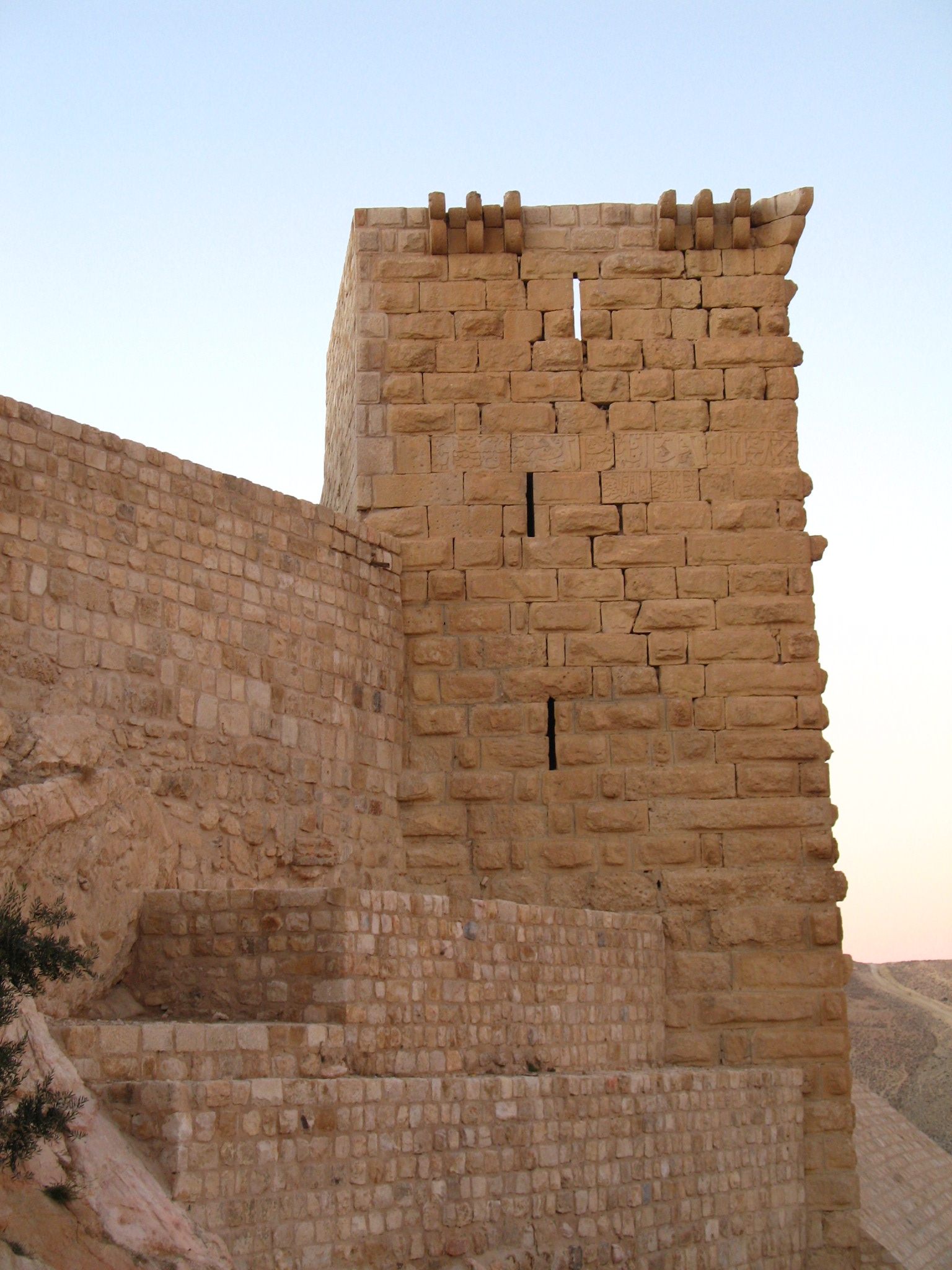
A tower of Montreal Castle

The castle was built in 1115 by Baldwin I of Jerusalem during his expedition to the area when he captured Aqaba on the Red Sea in 1116. Originally called 'Krak de Montreal' or 'Mons Regalis', it was named in honor of the king's own contribution to its construction (Mont Royal). The castle is located on a round hilltop site that is separated from the rest of the plateau of Edom, which along with the Moab formed the core of Oultrejourdain. Despite appearance, the Edom plain was a relatively fertile location, which made the site, along with its strategic importance, highly desirable. The castle was strategically important due to the fact that it also dominated the main passage from Egypt to Syria. This allowed whoever held the castle to tax not only traders, but also those who were on pilgrimages to Mecca and Medina. One of the major disadvantages of the site was the lack of a reliable source of water, an issue that the Crusaders encountered all over the Middle East. This problem was solved by the construction of a tunnel down the hill to two spring-fed cisterns. The tunnel allowed defenders to go and retrieve water without exposing themselves to any attackers.

It remained property of the royal family of the Kingdom of Jerusalem until 1142, when it became part of the Lordship of Oultrejordain. At the same time the center of the Lordship was moved to Kerak, a stronger fortress to the north of Montreal. Along with Kerak, the castle owed sixty knights to the kingdom. The first Lord of Oultrejordain was Philip of Nablus. It was held by Philip de Milly, and then passed to Raynald of Châtillon when he married Stephanie de Milly. Raynald used the castle to attack the rich caravans that had previously been allowed to pass unharmed. He also built ships there, then transported them overland to the Red Sea, planning to attack Mecca itself. This was intolerable to the Ayyubid sultan Saladin (Salah al-Din), who invaded the kingdom in 1187. After capturing Jerusalem, later in the year he besieged Montreal. During the siege the defenders are said to have sold their wives and children for food, and to have gone blind from "lack of salt." Because of the hill Saladin was unable to use siege engines, but after almost two years the castle finally fell to his troops in May 1189, after which the defenders' families were returned to them. After its capture, Saladin awarded it to his brother, al-'Adil, who held it until after his brother's death in 1193. During negotiations between the Crusaders and the Ayyubids in 1218–19, the Ayyubids unwillingness to hand back over the ownership of Montreal and Kerak was a major reason the negotiations broke down. In 1261, the Mamluk Sultan Baybars, stormed the castle bringing it under the control of Egypt.

== Structure ==
Little remains of the original Crusader fortifications. Although it has never been fully excavated, it is known that there was a set of three walls, which partially remain. The most significant remains of the Crusader portions of the castle is the remains of a curtain wall that ran inside the later Muslim additions and two chapels. The towers and walls are decorated with carved inscriptions dating from 14th century Mameluke renovations, but the inside is in ruins. The pilgrim Thietmar, who saw the castle in 1217 after the Muslim conquest, referred to it as "a most excellent fortress, surrounded by triple walls and as strong as any I have ever seen". The external walls and towers are attributed to the patronage of the Mamluk sultan Lajin.

== See also ==
- List of castles in Jordan
- Wu'ayra Castle (li Vaux Moysi), an outpost of Montreal near Petra

== Bibliography ==
- Pringle, D. (1997). Secular buildings in the Crusader Kingdom of Jerusalem: an archaeological Gazetter. Cambridge University Press. ISBN 0521 46010 7. (pp. 75-77)
- Pringle, D. (1998). The Churches of the Crusader Kingdom of Jerusalem: L-Z (exluding Tyre). Vol. II. Cambridge University Press. ISBN 0 521 39037 0. (pp. 304-314)
