= Ma'an Governorate =

Governorate of Jordan

Ma'an Governorate محافظة معان
- Governorate
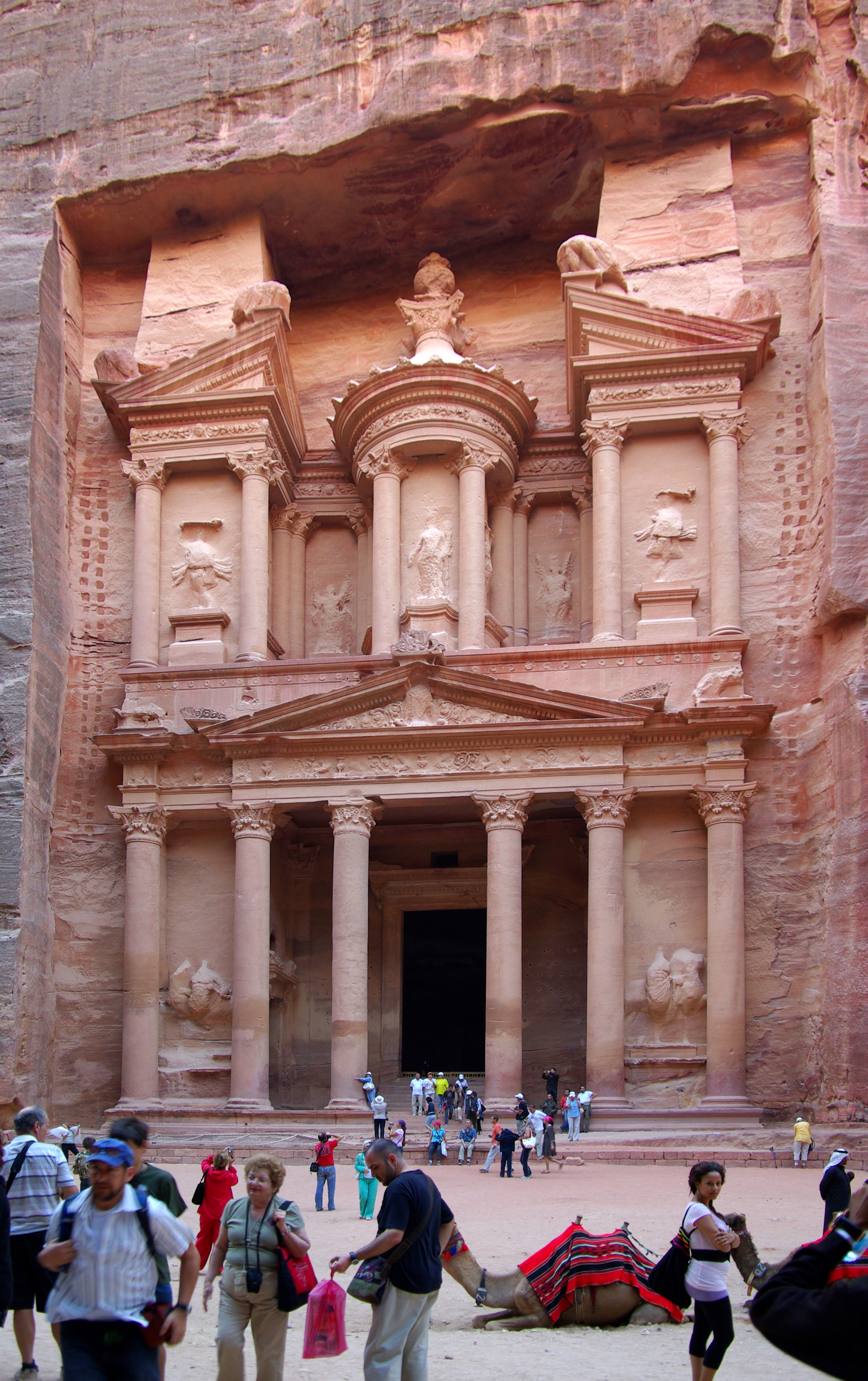
- Petra is a UNESCO world heritage site, and one of the New seven wonders of the world

- Ma'an Governorate
- Coordinates: 30°23′N 36°32′E
- Country: Jordan
- Capital: Ma'an

Area
  - Total: 32,832 km^{2} (12,677 sq mi)

Population (2012)
  - Total: 121,400
  - Density: 3.698/km^{2} (9.577/sq mi)
- Time zone: GMT +2
  - Summer (DST): +3
- Area code: +(962)3
- ISO 3166 code: JO-MN
- Urban: 54.9%
- Rural: 45.1%
- HDI (2021): 0.693 medium · 11th of 12

Ma'an (Arabic: معان) is one of the governorates of Jordan. It is located south of Amman, Jordan's capital. Its capital is the city of Ma'an. This governorate is the largest in the kingdom of Jordan by area.

== History ==
The land of the Governorate of Ma'an hosts many historic sites. The land of Ma'an Governorate was under the Edomite rule, which had its capital in Busaira in neighboring Tafilah Governorate. The Edomites were then replaced by the Nabateans who built one of the most significant archaeological and historical sites in the Middle East, the ancient city of Petra. After succeeding in repulsing Macedonian and Roman invasions, Petra finally fell to the Roman Empire in 103 A.D. Near Petra is Jebel Harun or Jebel Nebi Harun (lit. 'Mountain of Prophet Aaron'), a strong candidate for biblical Mount Hor where Aaron, the brother of Moses, died and was buried. There is a mosque at the top of the mountain, built at the traditional site of Aaron's tomb.

Evidence for human settlement in Ma'an Governorate dates back to at least 7000 BC, when the Neolithic village of Basta was founded. Basta was one of the first settlements in the world to have agriculture and domesticated livestock.

In the 7th century A.D. the lands of Ma'an were annexed to the Islamic Khaliphate following the 629 Battle of Mu'tah. With the coming of the Crusaders in the 11th century, The Crusaders took control of the highlands of Shoubak, at an elevation of more than 1300 meters above sea level, the Crusaders built the castle of Montreal in the city of Shoubak.

Ma'an was the capital of the Arab state declared by Emir Abdullah for a short period of time in 1920 before moving the capital to Amman. The first newspaper in the modern day Jordan was issued in Ma'an and was named Alhaqqu Ya'lu (الحق يعلو ).

In Autumn 1996 and Spring 1997 the Al-Jafr-desert, located near Al-Jafr in the eastern part of the governorate, was the location of extensive tests of the ThrustSSC, the British-built currently fastest land vehicle in the world, which was the first land vehicle to break the sound barrier in October 1997 in the Black Rock Desert, Nevada, United States. The ThrustSSC was thus therefore the fastest land vehicle ever driven in an Arab country.

== Geography ==
Although Ma'an Governorate has the largest area of the 12 governorates that constitute the Kingdom of Jordan, it has the lowest population density: less than 4 persons per square km. It has international borders with Saudi Arabia from the east and south, and borders Aqaba, Tafilah, and Karak governorates from the west, and Amman Governorate from the north.

The climate in Ma'an is mostly desert climate, but the western highlands have a Mediterranean climate. The average annual rainfall ranges from 50 mm in the desert regions to 250 mm in the western highlands, and exceeds 500 mm in the Sharah mountains.

== Demographics ==
The population of districts according to census results:

District	Area km^{2}	Population (Census 1994)	Population (Census 2004)	Population (Census 2015)
Al-Betrā' (Petra)	240	22,459	23,840	19,828
Husseiniya	528	6,472	8,310	17,323
Ash-Shūbak	383	9,881	11,087	19,279
Qaṣabah Ma'ān	31,680	40,858	51,016	87,652
Ma'an Governorate	32,832	79,670	94,253	144,082

== Administrative divisions ==
The ministry of Interior divides Ma'an Governorate into four departments under Article 7 of the Administrative Divisions System of the year 2000. The capital department is further subdivided into five subdivisions:

Departments of Ma'an Governorate by population (2004 Census)
	Department	Arabic Name	Areas	Population (2004)	Administrative Center
1	Ma'an Department (Al-Qasabah)	لواء قصبة معان	includes the city of Ma'an and 56 other towns and villages	51,016	Ma'an
2	Petra Department	لواء البتراء	includes 19 towns and villages	23,840	Wadi Musa
3	Shoubak Department	لواء الشوبك	includes 27 towns and villages	12,087	Shoubak
4	Husseiniya Department	لواء الحسينية	includes eight towns and villages	8,310	Husseiniya
Source: وزارة الداخلية - الأردن Jordanian ministry of interior

== Gallery ==
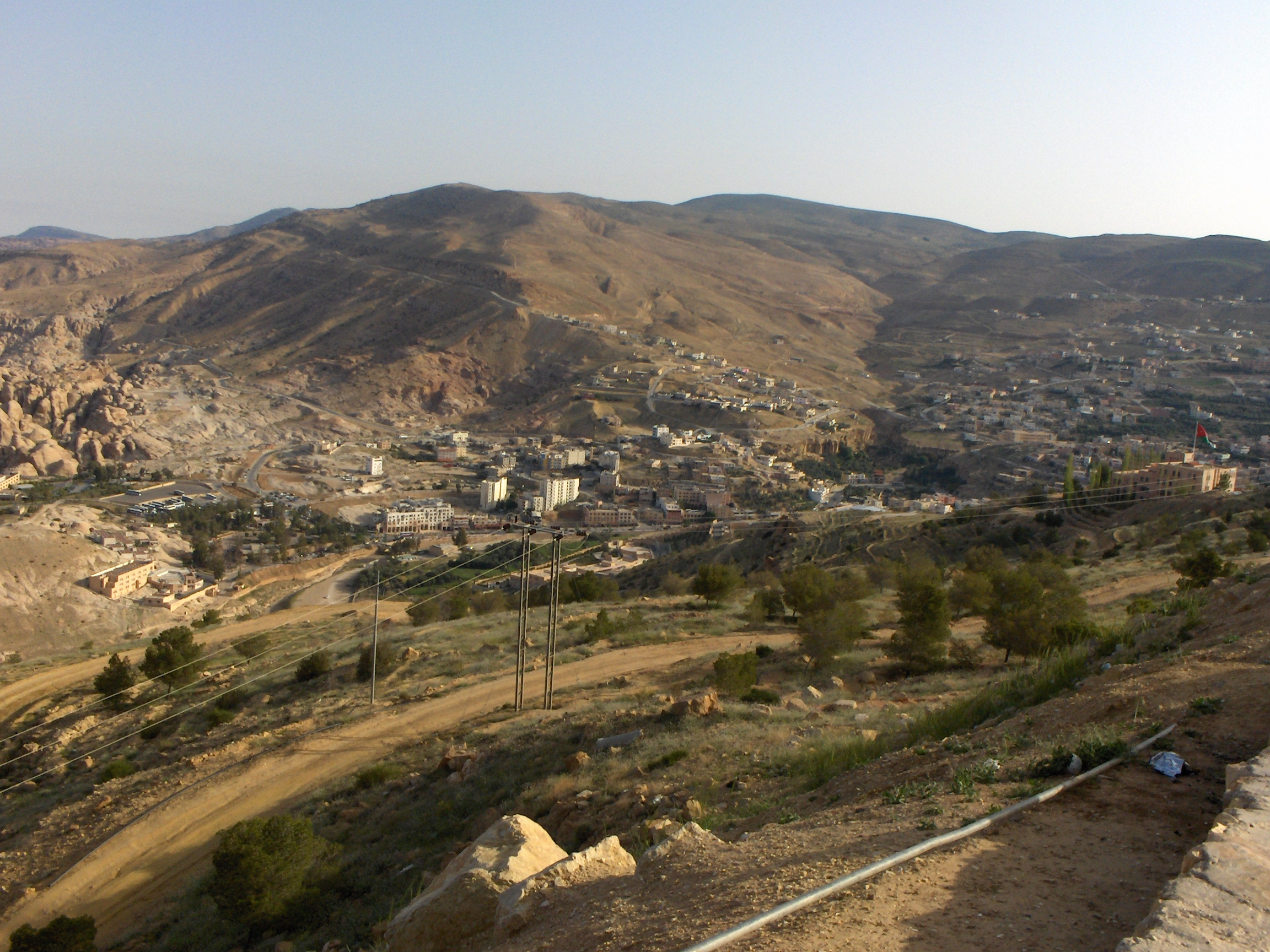
Wadi Musa

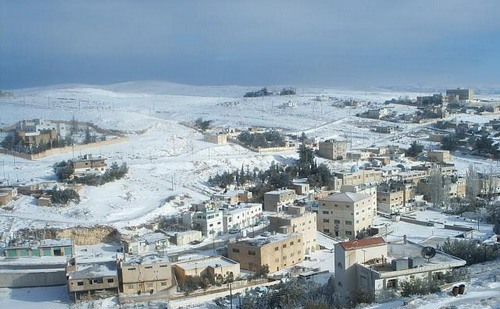
The town of Shoubak in Ma'an Governorate

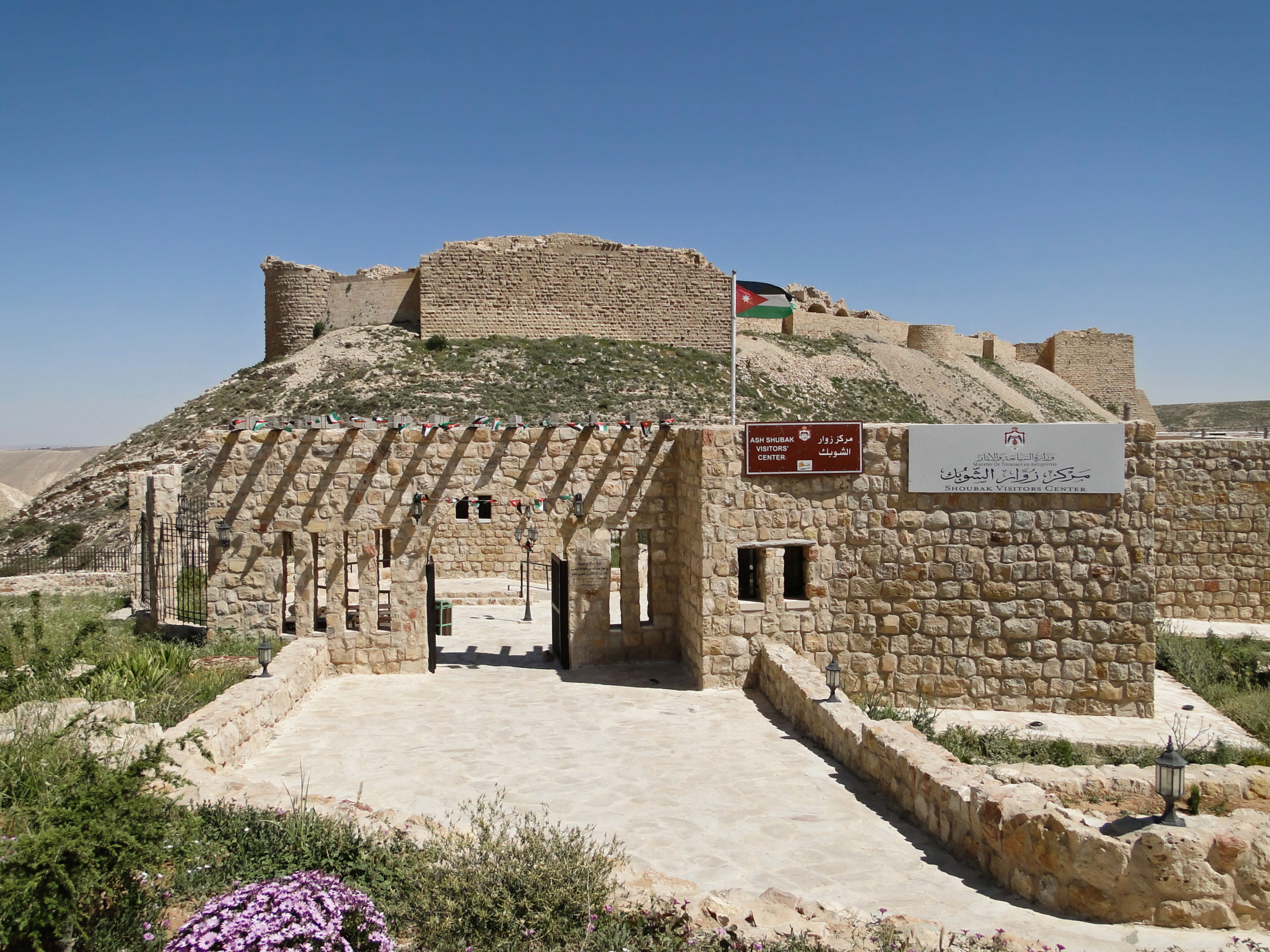
The Crusader castle of Montreal in Shoubak

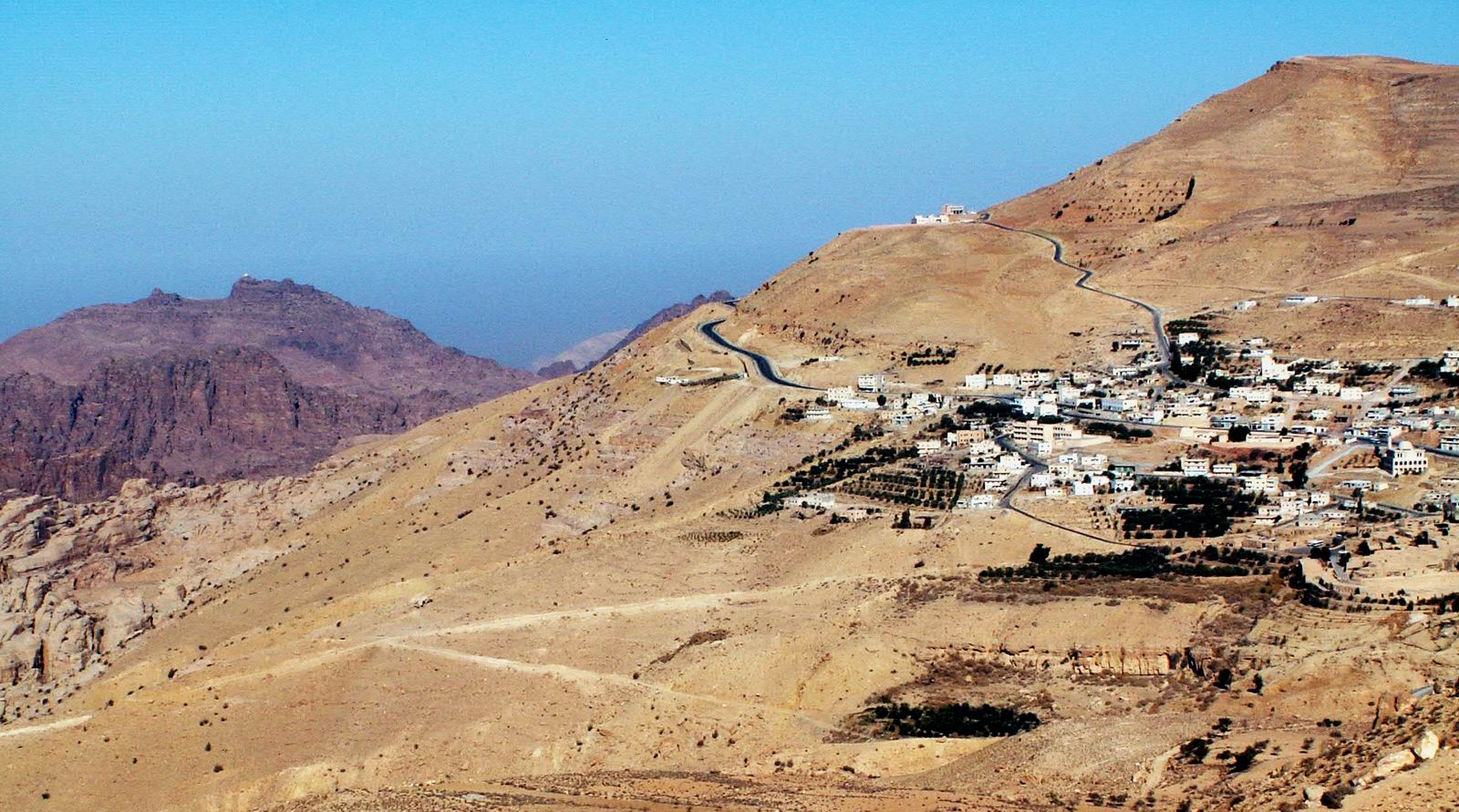
Jebel Harun (Mount Aaron), where it is believed that Aaron, the brother of Moses died, and the town of Taibeh
