= Wadi Musa =

Wadi Musa وادي موسى
- Town
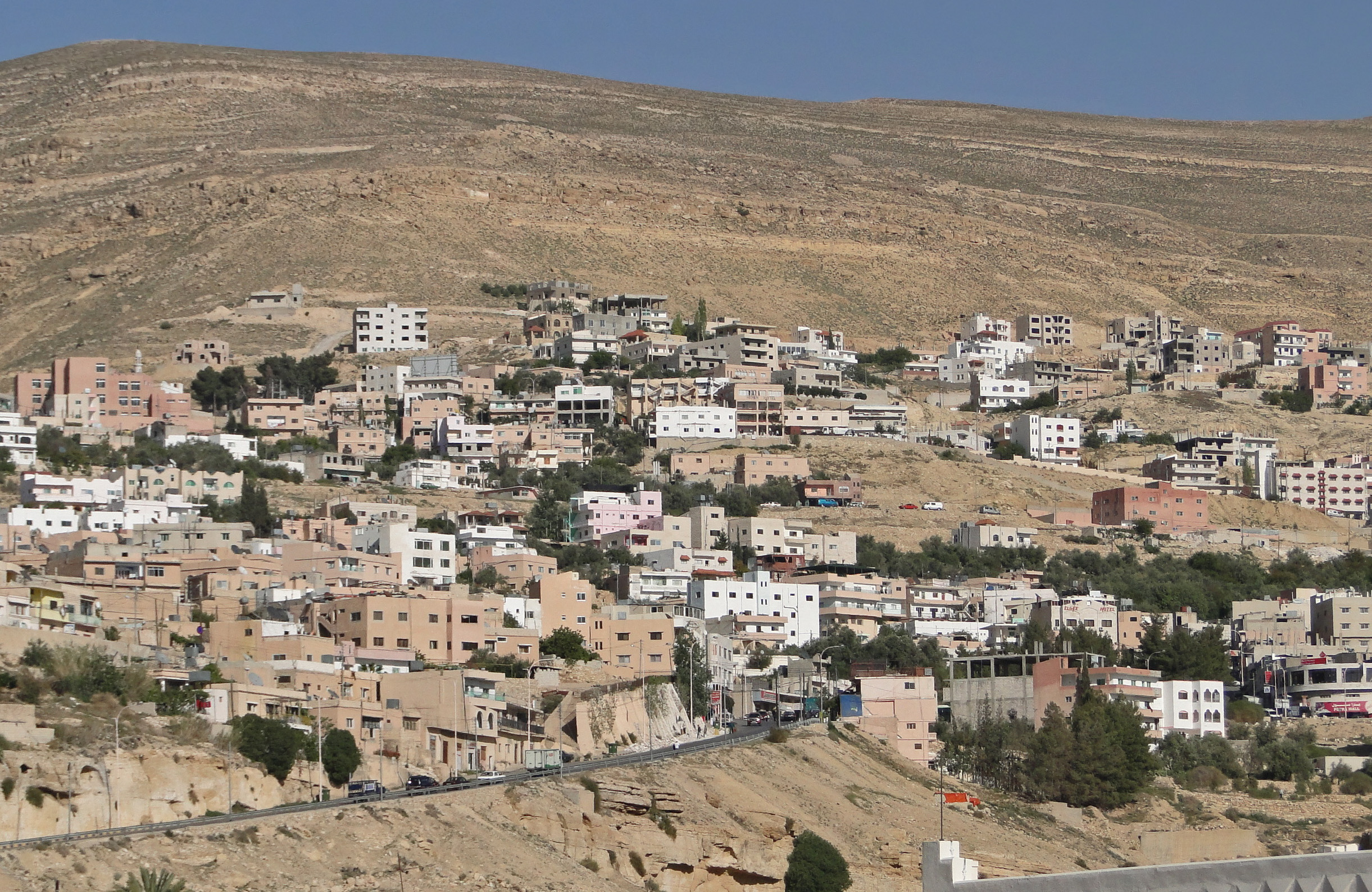

- Location within Jordan
- Coordinates: 30°19′12″N 35°28′42″E
- Country: Jordan
- Governorate: Ma'an Governorate

Area
  - Total: 7.36 km^{2} (2.84 sq mi)
- (excludes Al Hayy, an undeveloped residential zone)
- Elevation: 1,050–1,450 m (3,440–4,760 ft)

Population (2015)
  - Total: Approximately 14,000
  - Density: 1,902/km^{2} (4,930/sq mi)
- Time zone: GMT +2
  - Summer (DST): +3
- Area code: +(962)3

Wadi Musa (Arabic: وادي موسى, lit. 'Valley of Moses') is a town located in the Ma'an Governorate in southern Jordan. It is the administrative center of the Petra Department and the nearest town to the archaeological site of Petra, being only 3.5 km (2.2 miles) away. Most of the locals belong to the Liyathnah tribe. It hosts many hotels and restaurants for tourists, and the important B'doul settlement of Umm Seyhoun, created after the community's forced displacement in 1985, is approximately 2 kilometres (1 mi) from the town.

== Etymology ==
Wadi Musa means "Valley of Moses" in Arabic. It is said that Moses passed through the valley and struck water from the rock for his followers at the site of Ain Musa ("Moses Spring" or "Moses' Well"). The Nabateans built channels that carried water from this spring to the city of Petra. Wadi Musa was also nicknamed the "Guardian of Petra". The Tomb of Aaron, the traditional burial site of biblical Aaron, the brother of Moses, is on nearby Jebel Harun, a strong candidate for biblical Mount Hor.

== History ==
During the Nabatean period, the valley now occupied by modern Wadi Musa contained a substantial settlement known as Gaia.

During the Crusader period, the area was part of the Lordship of Transjordan and was defended by the castle, li Vaux Moysi.

During the Arab Revolt, Turkish forces under the command of Mehmed Djemal Pasha attacked Wadi Musa on 21 Oct. 1917. The Ottoman forces were defeated by forces under the command of Mawlud Mukhlis, Faisal's aide-de-camp.

The Jordanian census of 1961 found 654 inhabitants in Wadi Musa.

== Climate ==
In Wadi Musa, there is a semi-arid climate. Most rain falls in the winter. The Köppen-Geiger climate classification is BSk. The average annual temperature in Wadi Musa is 15.5 °C (59.9 °F). About 193 mm (7.60 in) of precipitation falls annually.

Climate data for Wadi Musa
Month	Jan	Feb	Mar	Apr	May	Jun	Jul	Aug	Sep	Oct	Nov	Dec	Year
Mean daily maximum °C (°F)	11.0 (51.8)	13.1 (55.6)	16.6 (61.9)	20.9 (69.6)	25.1 (77.2)	28.6 (83.5)	29.8 (85.6)	30.0 (86.0)	28.1 (82.6)	24.6 (76.3)	18.2 (64.8)	13.4 (56.1)	21.6 (70.9)
Mean daily minimum °C (°F)	2.2 (36.0)	2.8 (37.0)	5.6 (42.1)	8.7 (47.7)	11.7 (53.1)	14.1 (57.4)	16.1 (61.0)	16.5 (61.7)	14.2 (57.6)	11.2 (52.2)	7.1 (44.8)	3.4 (38.1)	9.5 (49.1)
Average precipitation mm (inches)	45 (1.8)	38 (1.5)	36 (1.4)	12 (0.5)	4 (0.2)	0 (0)	0 (0)	0 (0)	0 (0)	2 (0.1)	15 (0.6)	41 (1.6)	193 (7.6)
Source: Climate-Data.org, Climate data

== Demographics ==
As of 2009, Wadi Musa's population was 17,085, with a male-to-female sex ratio of 52.1 to 47.9 (8,901 males and 8,184 females), making it the most populous settlement of the Petra Department. As of the 2004 census, Petra Department, which includes Wadi Musa and 18 other villages, had a population of 23,840 inhabitants. The population density of the town was 2.3 people per dunam, or 23 inhabitants per hectare (9.3/acre), and the population growth rate was 3.2%.

Most of the town's population belongs to the Liyathnah tribe, whose members play leading roles in the region's economy and politics and dominate the local tourism industry since the 20th century. Almost the entire population is Muslim.

== Economy ==
The town is about 250 kilometres (160 mi) from Amman, Jordan's capital, and 100 kilometres (60 mi) north of the port city of Aqaba. With more than 50 hotels and many tourist restaurants, its economy is almost entirely tied to tourism.

The campus of the College of Archaeology, Tourism & Hotel Management of Al-Hussein Bin Talal University is located in Wadi Musa.

== Archaeology ==
Beneath the modern town of Wadi Musa lie the remains of an ancient settlement. Archaeological evidence points to a prosperous Nabataean centre with residences, villas, temples, agricultural installations, and water systems. Inscriptions associate the settlement, then known as Gaia, with the deities Dushara and al-Kutba.

Several Nabataean inscriptions have been discovered in the Wadi Musa area. One, probably dating to the 1st century CE, was carved on a hill at Jilwah in the northwestern part of Wadi Musa and preserves a personal name followed by the phrase "in Gaia", confirming that the name Gaia referred to Wadi Musa.

Another inscription, found reused in a room of the traditional Bani Ata village (also known as Khirbet Raydan) in the southern part of Wadi Musa and dated to the reign of Aretas IV (9 BC – 40 AD) through its use of the royal epithet "Aretas, lover of his people", mentions a rb mrzhʾ ("head of the marzeah", comparable to the Greek "head of the symposium") in Gaia. It provides evidence for the existence of an organized marzeah, a banqueting ceremony/association widely attested throughout the ancient Levant.

=== Khirbat an-Nawāfla ===
In the northwestern sector of modern Wadi Musa lies the archaeological site of Khirbat an-Nawāfla. Evidence indicates activity as early as the Iron Age II (Edomite) period, although the site's main period of development began in the Nabataean era (1st century BC), when it grew into an agricultural village with cisterns, water channels, houses, courtyards, and olive presses. One olive press from this phase was considered by the excavators to be the earliest known Nabataean example. The settlement continued through the Late Roman and Byzantine periods, which produced evidence of Christian activity, including carved crosses and a possible church building, and into the Early Islamic period, represented by the remains of housing and a Kufic inscription dated to AH 170 (AD 787), described by the excavators as the only known inscription of that date from southern Bilad al-Sham. Occupation continued during the Ayyubid and Mamluk periods, when the settlement reached its greatest extent and included extensive olive-pressing facilities, cemeteries, and numerous artifacts such as pottery, glass, and iron tools. The excavators tentatively identified the site with the village of al-'Udmal mentioned by Al-Nuwayri in connection with Sultan Baybars's 1276 journey. The site remained inhabited into the Ottoman period and was later resettled by the an-Nawafla tribe in the late 19th century.

== Gallery ==
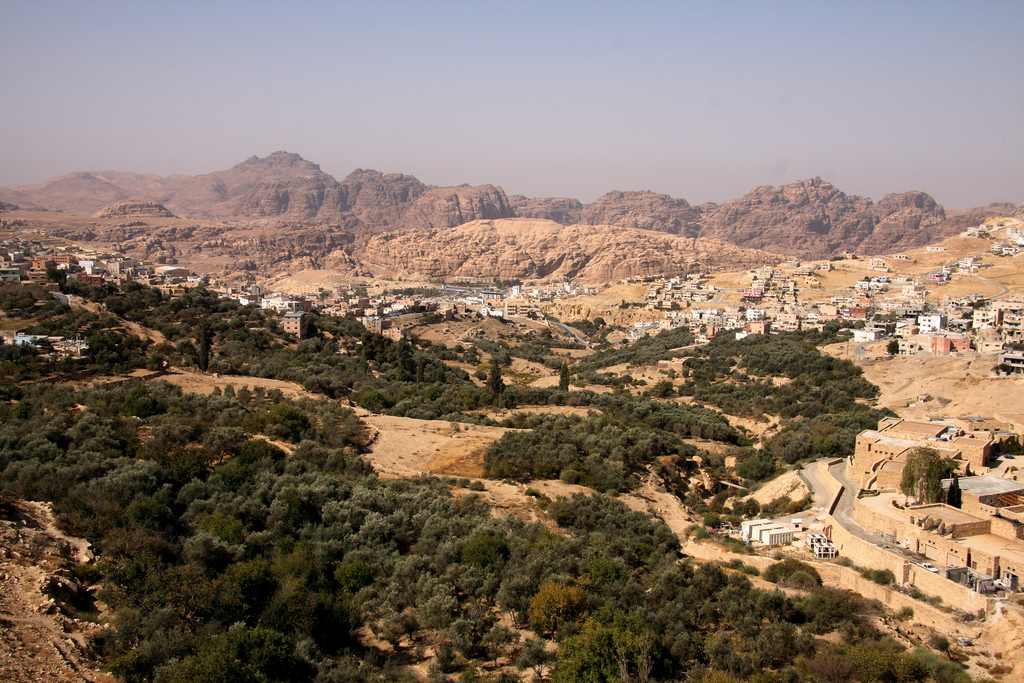
Wadi Musa Valley

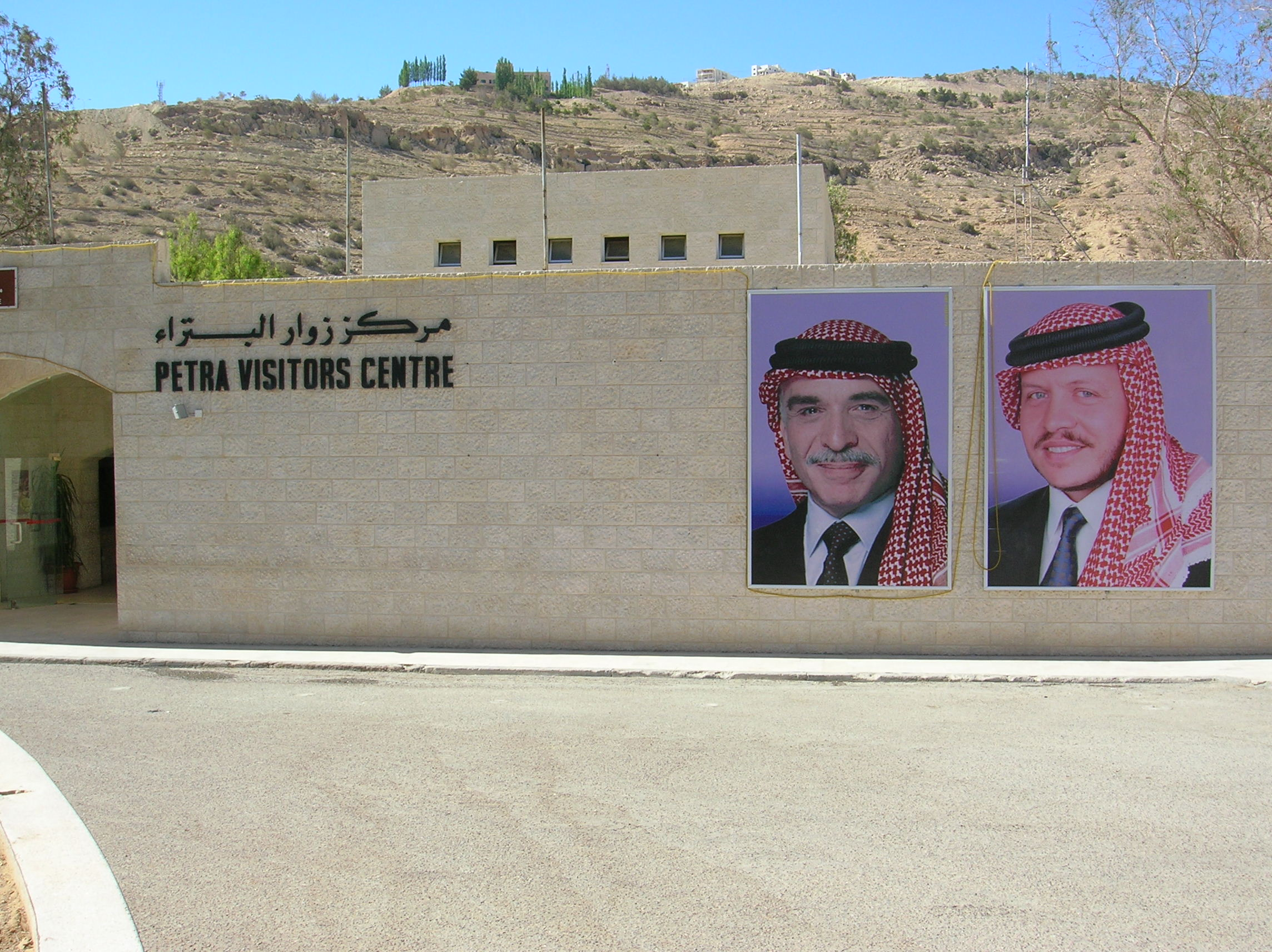
Petra Visitors Center

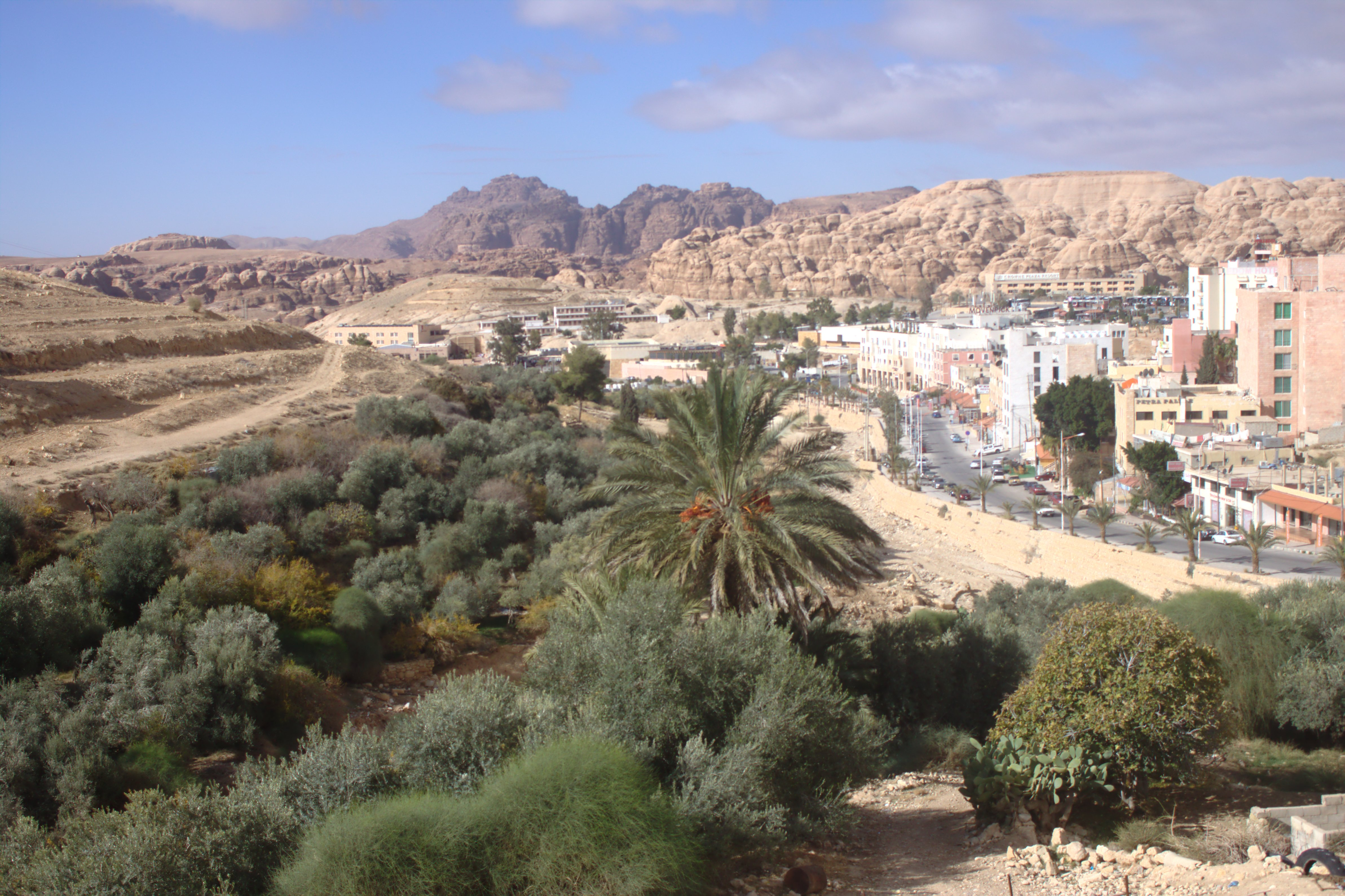
Townscape

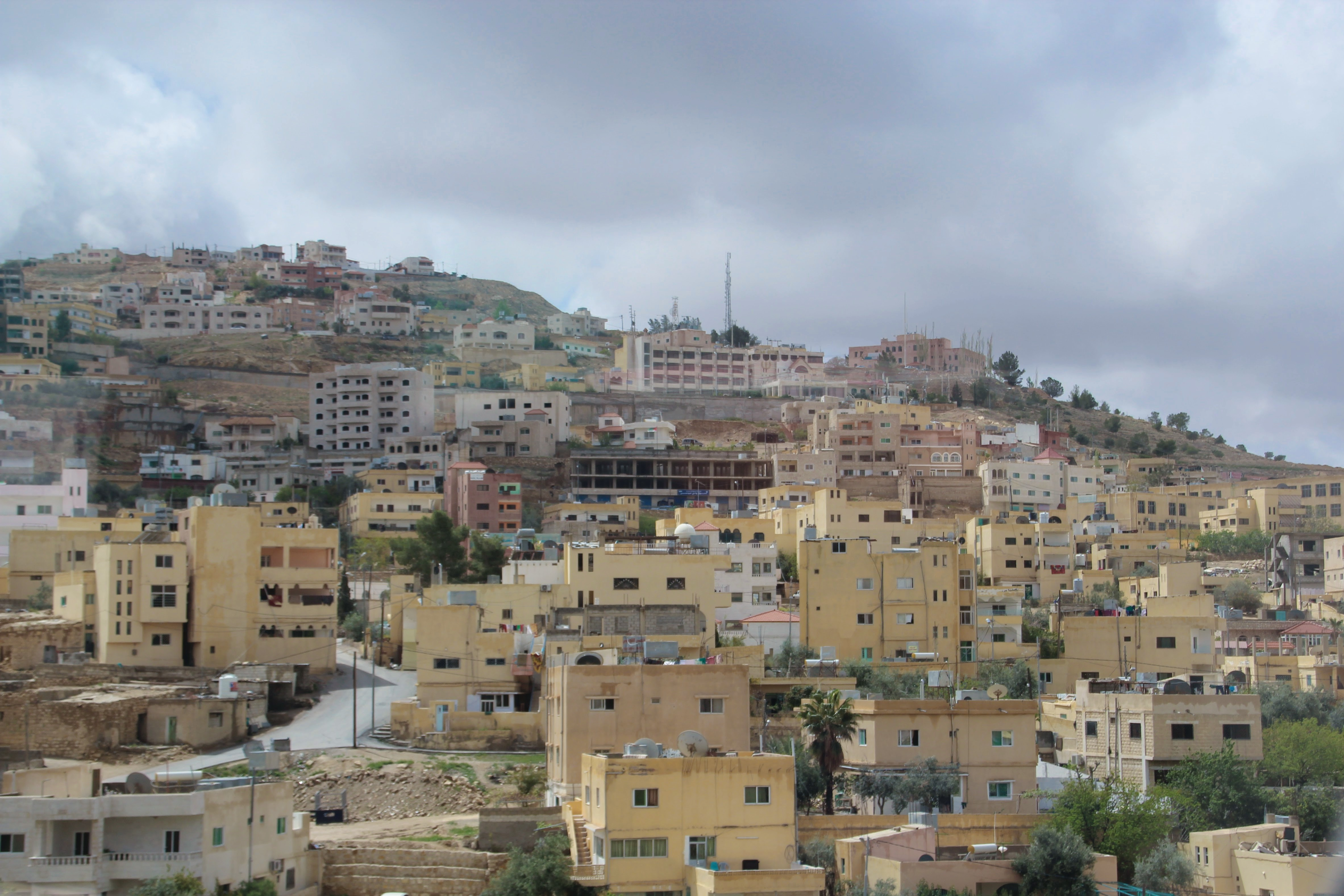
Houses in Wadi Musa

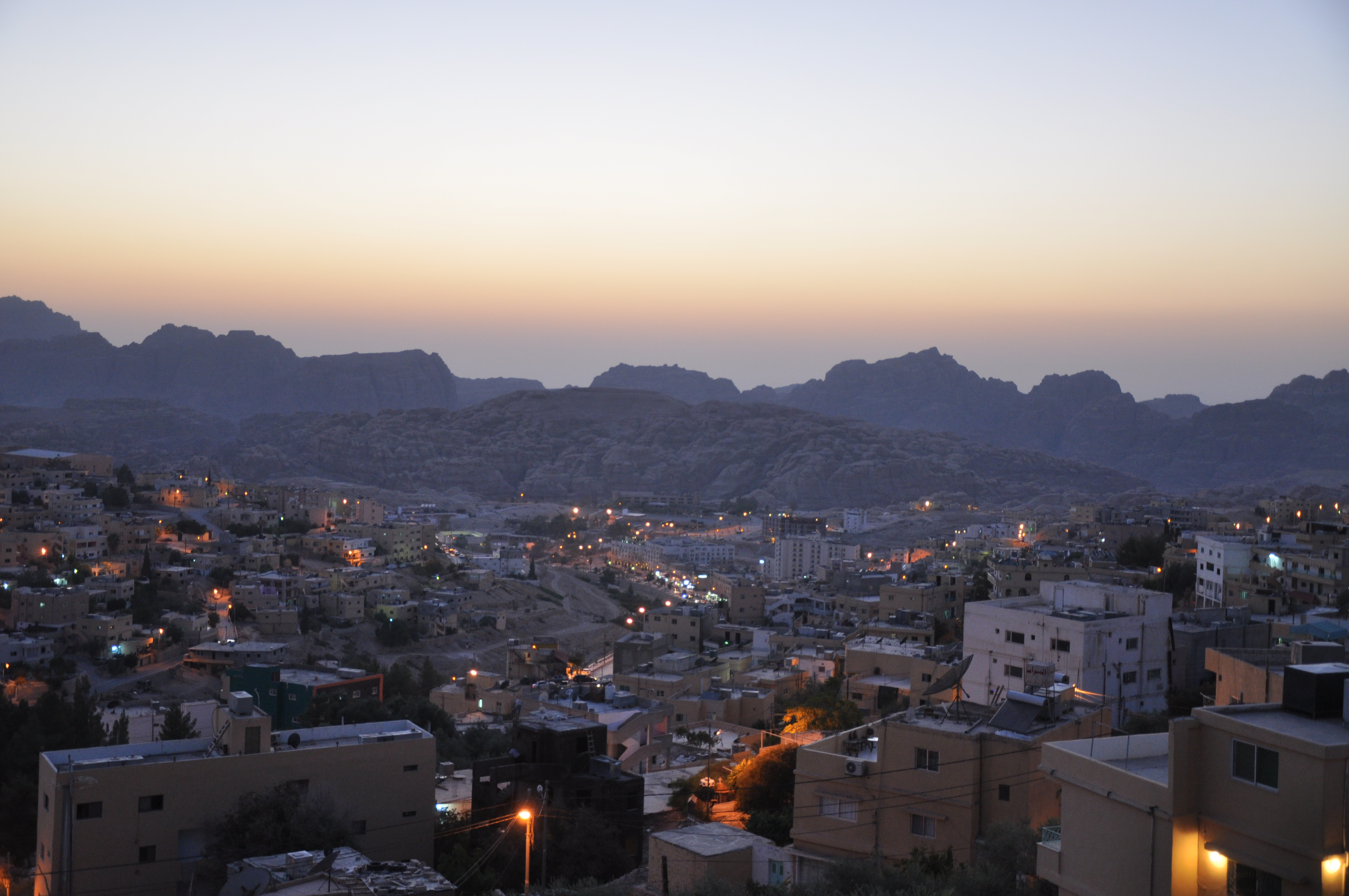
Wadi Musa at dusk

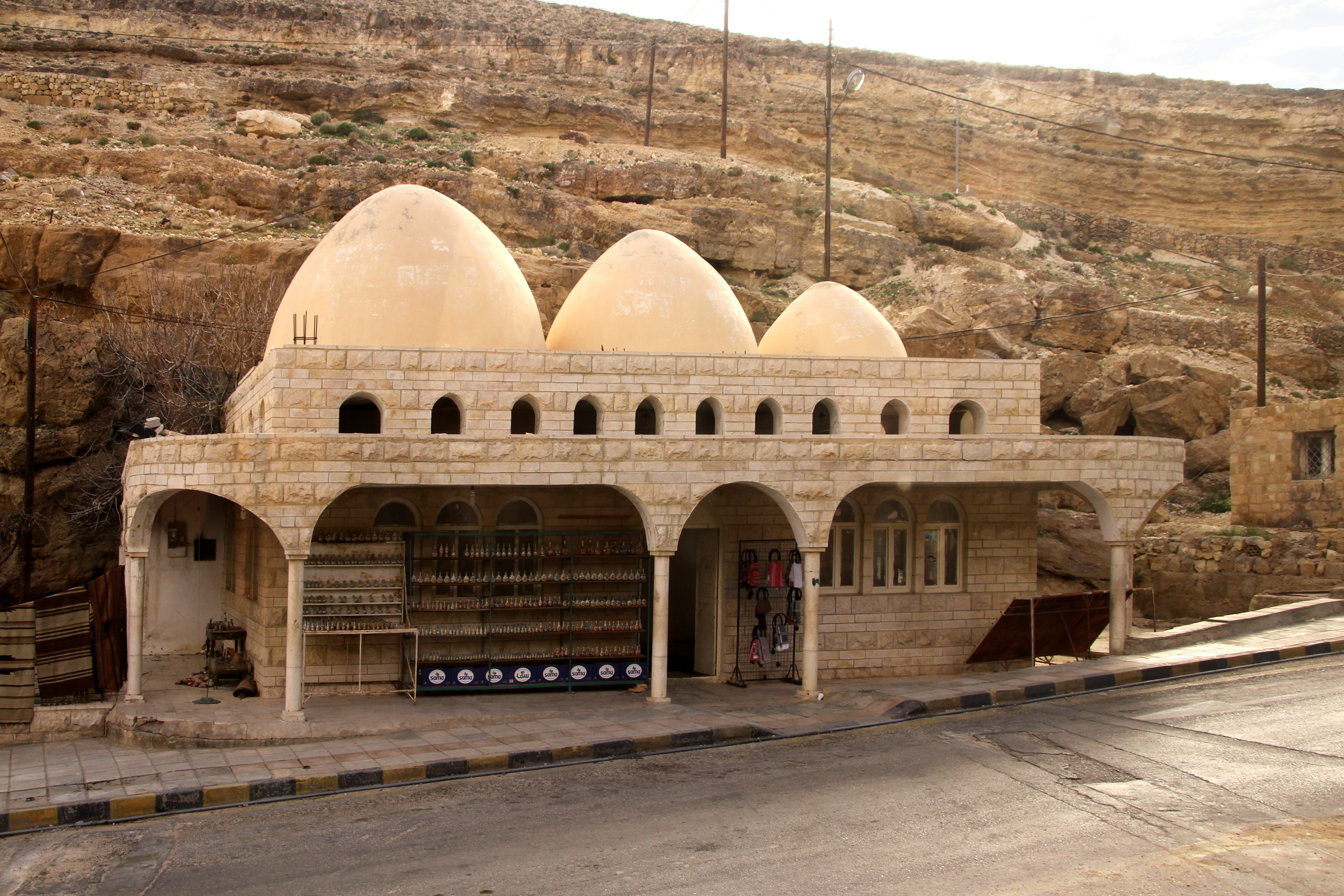
Moses source

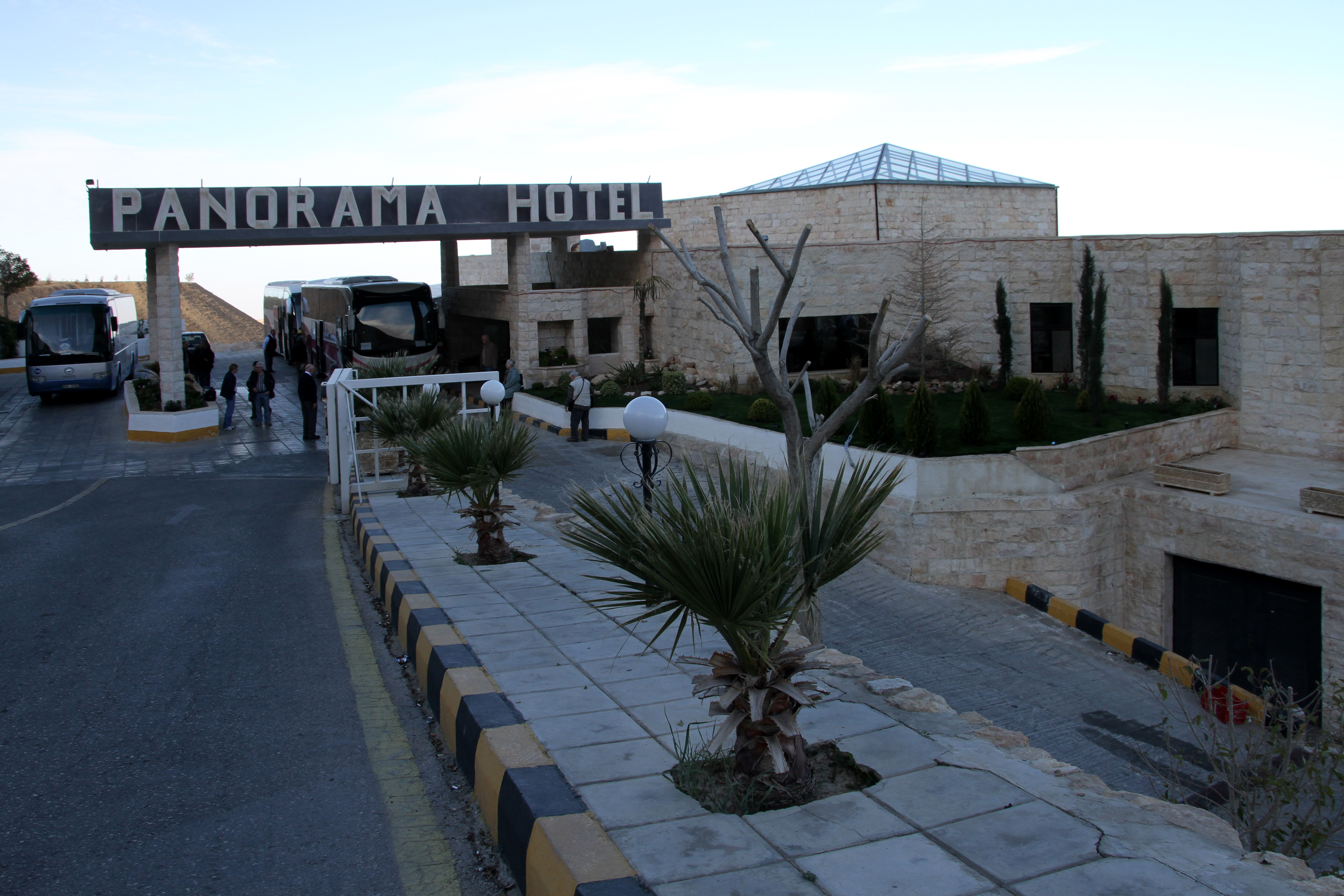
Hotel

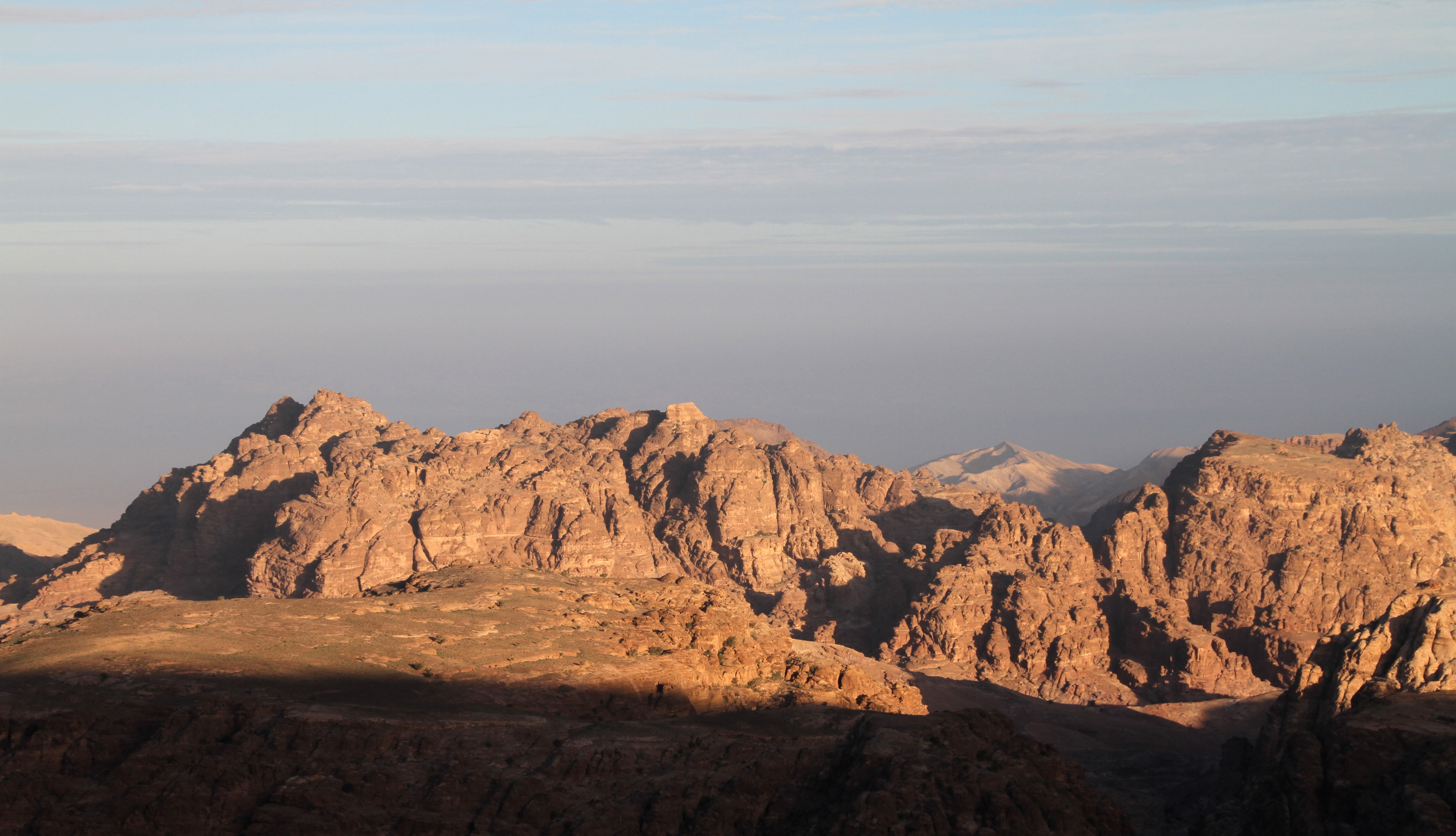
Mountains

== Bibliography ==
- Government of Jordan, Department of Statistics (1964). First Census of Population and Housing. Volume I: Final Tables; General Characteristics of the Population (PDF).
