= 2024 Allenby Bridge shooting =

2024 shooting attack at the Allenby Bridge

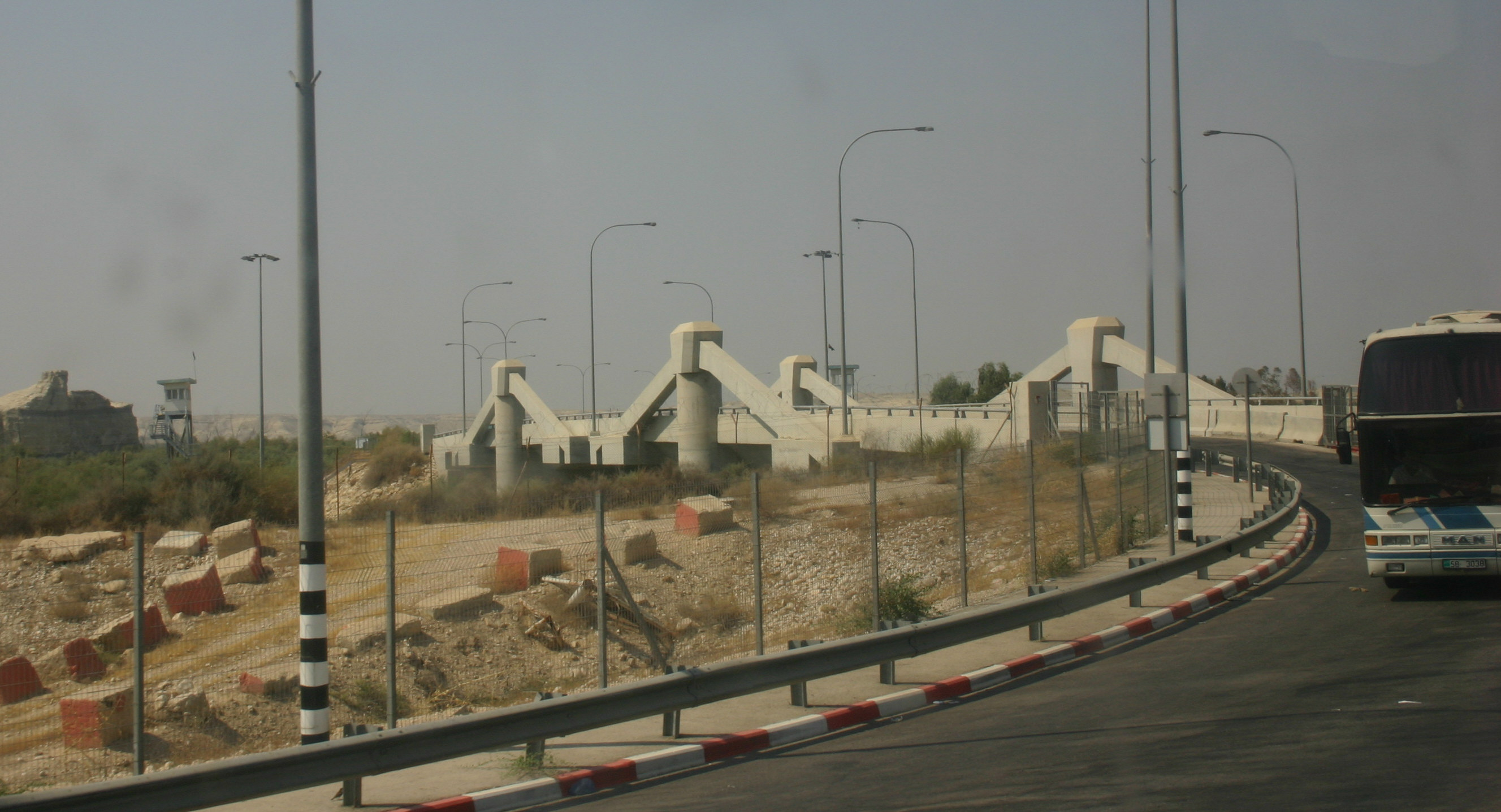
- Allenby Bridge as seen from the west looking east into Jordan

- Location of Allenby Bridge within the Israeli-occupied West Bank Allenby Bridge (State of Palestine)
- Location: Allenby Bridge Border crossing
- Date: 8 September 2024
- Target: Israeli border personnel
- Attack type: Shooting attack
- Weapon: Pistol
- Deaths: 4 (including the perpetrator)
- Perpetrator: Islamic Resistance in Jordan
- Assailant: Maher Al-Jazi

On the morning of September 8, 2024, a Jordanian truck driver carried out a shooting attack at the border terminal adjacent to the Allenby Bridge connecting Jordan to the Israeli-occupied West Bank, killing three Israeli civilian border workers.

The truck driver approached Israeli staff at the terminal and then opened fire, killing three. The perpetrator was shot and killed by Israeli security forces.

Following the attack, Israel identified the three victims as workers at the border terminal and residents of Israeli settlements in the West Bank. Jordan identified the attacker as one of its citizens, named Maher Al-Jazy, a lone perpetrator from Husseiniya, southern Jordan, while condemning attacks against civilians and calling for de-escalation.

On the streets in Jordan, some citizens gathered to celebrate the attack, amid widespread anger over the war in Gaza.

== Background ==
The Allenby Bridge, also known as the King Hussein Bridge, is located a few kilometers east of Jericho. It connects the Israeli-occupied West Bank with Jordan, and has seen a number of violent incidents. The crossing primarily serves Palestinians and foreigners, with Israelis generally prohibited from using it. Relations between Israel and Jordan had been tense since the start of the Gaza war in October 2023, with Jordan having recalled its ambassador to israel. Nonetheless, security cooperation remained close; in April 2024, Jordan helped Israel in shooting down Iranian missiles launched against Israel.

The bridge crossing was allegedly targeted by a cell of four operatives from As-Salt, who plotted to detonate a truck bomb. Jordanian authorities arrested the cell members in July 2024, and they were not believed to have been affiliated with any external organization or other countries. The arrests were not made public until the day following the shooting.

In April 2024, Kata'ib Hezbollah stated their intention to arm the "Islamic Resistance" in Jordan and were ready to provide "12,000 fighters with light and medium weapons, anti-armor launchers, tactical missiles, millions of rounds of ammunition, and tons of explosives" to "defend the Palestinians and avenge the honour of Muslims." However, according to Jordan's Interior Minister Mazen Frayeh, there were no indications that Kata'ib Hezbollah were involved this attack.

== Attack ==
On the morning of September 8, 2024, around 10 a.m., Maher Al-Jazi, a 39-year-old Jordanian truck driver, arrived at the Allenby Crossing from Jordan. Concealing a Kalashnikov rifle in his truck, he approached the Israeli workers at the cargo terminal. Upon reaching them, he pulled out the weapon and began shooting at close range.

The three victims, all employees of the Allenby Crossing terminal and residents of Israeli settlements in the West Bank, were critically injured and later pronounced dead. The victims were Yohanan Shchori, 61; Yuri Birnbaum, 65; and Adrian Marcelo Podsmeser, 57.

The Israel Defense Forces (IDF) described the incident as a terrorist attack. The IDF stated that the attacker drove a truck from Jordan, exited the vehicle, and began shooting at Israeli security forces. The IDF also released a photograph of the handgun used in the attack. The gunman was shot and killed by a security guard. Israeli authorities inspected his truck for over an hour after his death to ensure that the truck was not rigged with explosives, given that a plot to blow up the crossing with a truck bomb was thwarted a few weeks prior.

Israel detained two Jordanian citizens who were at the site of the attack and released them to Jordan on September 23.

On September 17, Israel returned to Jordan the body of the perpetrator.

== Responses ==
=== Jordan ===
Jordan released a statement saying that it closed its borders and is currently investigating this incident. Later, Jordanian authorities identified the shooter as Maher Al-Jazi from Husseiniya, Ma'an Governorate, in southern Jordan. The Jordanian Ministry of Interior reported that Al-Jazi had acted alone and was driving a vehicle transporting commercial goods from Jordan to the West Bank. The Jordanian government coordinated the repatriation of Al-Jazi’s body for burial in Jordan.

Jordan's Foreign Ministry condemned the shooting and rejected violence targeting civilians. The ministry also emphasized the need to address the root causes of the conflict and called for de-escalation. According to the Jerusalem Post, King Abdullah II of Jordan did not condemn the attack, which was different from his father Hussein's response in 1997, when Hussein personally visited the Israeli families of schoolgirls killed by a Jordanian soldier in a prior border incident.

The Howeitat clan praised the attacker, who was a relative, stating that "What our son has done was a natural response from a devoted patriot defending his Arab country against Israel's ongoing crimes against the Palestinian people in Gaza."

Following the attack, hundreds of Jordanians in Amman celebrated the shooting.

=== Israel ===
Israeli President Isaac Herzog expressed his condolences to the victims, adding that "the peace agreements between Israel and its neighbours are cornerstones in the quest for stability in the region, and we trust all parties to carry out a thorough investigation of this serious incident, the results of which require us to stand firm together in the face of terrorism."

Israeli Prime Minister Benjamin Netanyahu condemned the attack as an act of terrorism, referring to the perpetrator as a "despicable terrorist." Netanyahu also criticized what he referred to as a “murderous ideology” propagated by Iran's influence. Three days after the attack, he visited the Israel-Jordan border at the Jordan Valley and promised to construct, in cooperation with all parties, a stronger barrier in order to fight smuggling.

=== Hamas ===
Hamas praised the attack and said it was "executed by a fearless Jordanian individual."

=== Kata'ib Hezbollah ===
Kata'ib Hezbollah based in Iraq praised the "heroic operation for the Islamic Resistance in Jordan".

== See also ==
- 2024 Neot HaKikar shooting
- 2023 Egypt–Israel border shooting incident
- Raed Zeiter incident
- 2025 Allenby Bridge shooting
