= Law enforcement in Jordan =

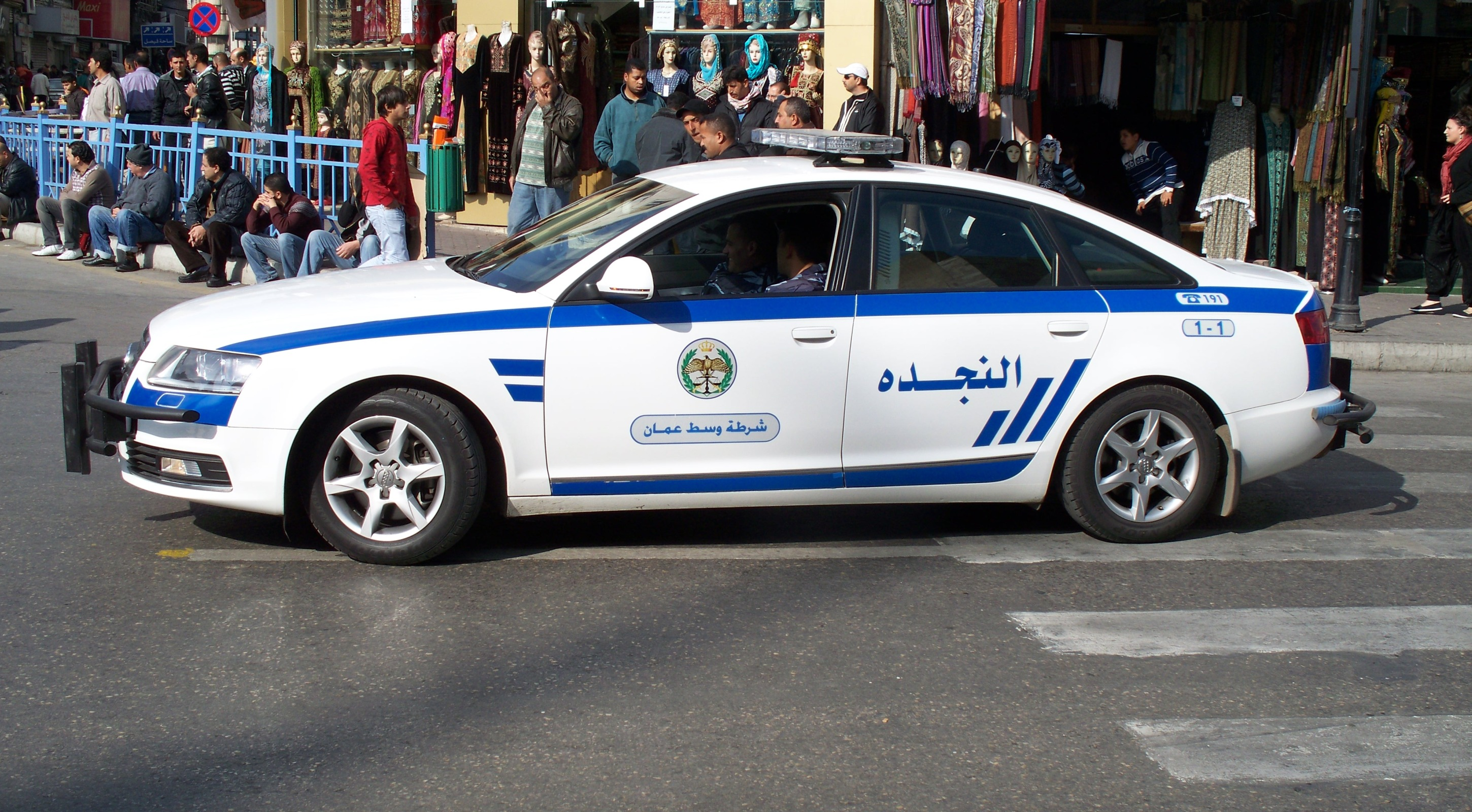
An Amman City Centre Police vehicle

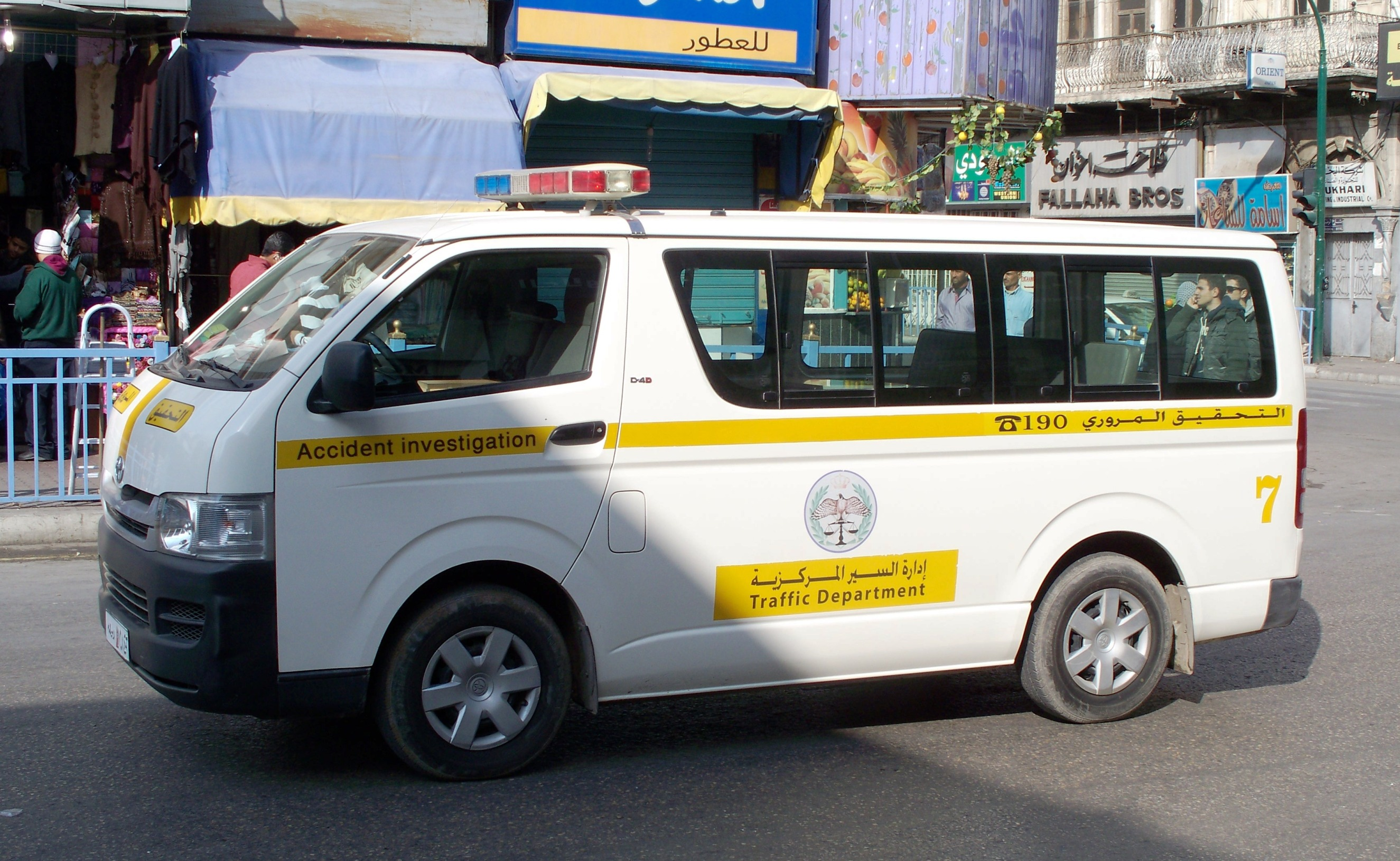
Accident investigation vehicle

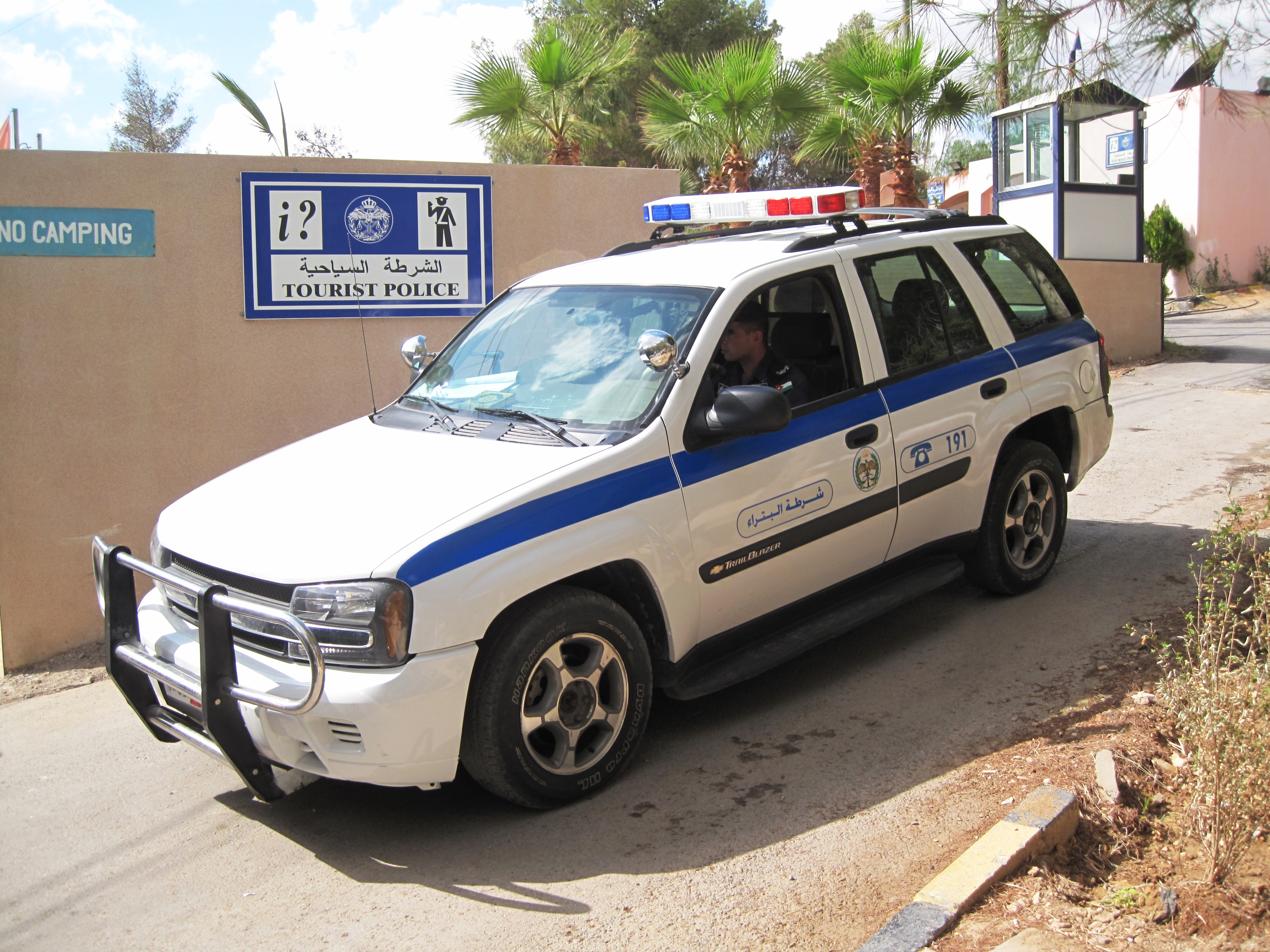
External roads patrol vehicle

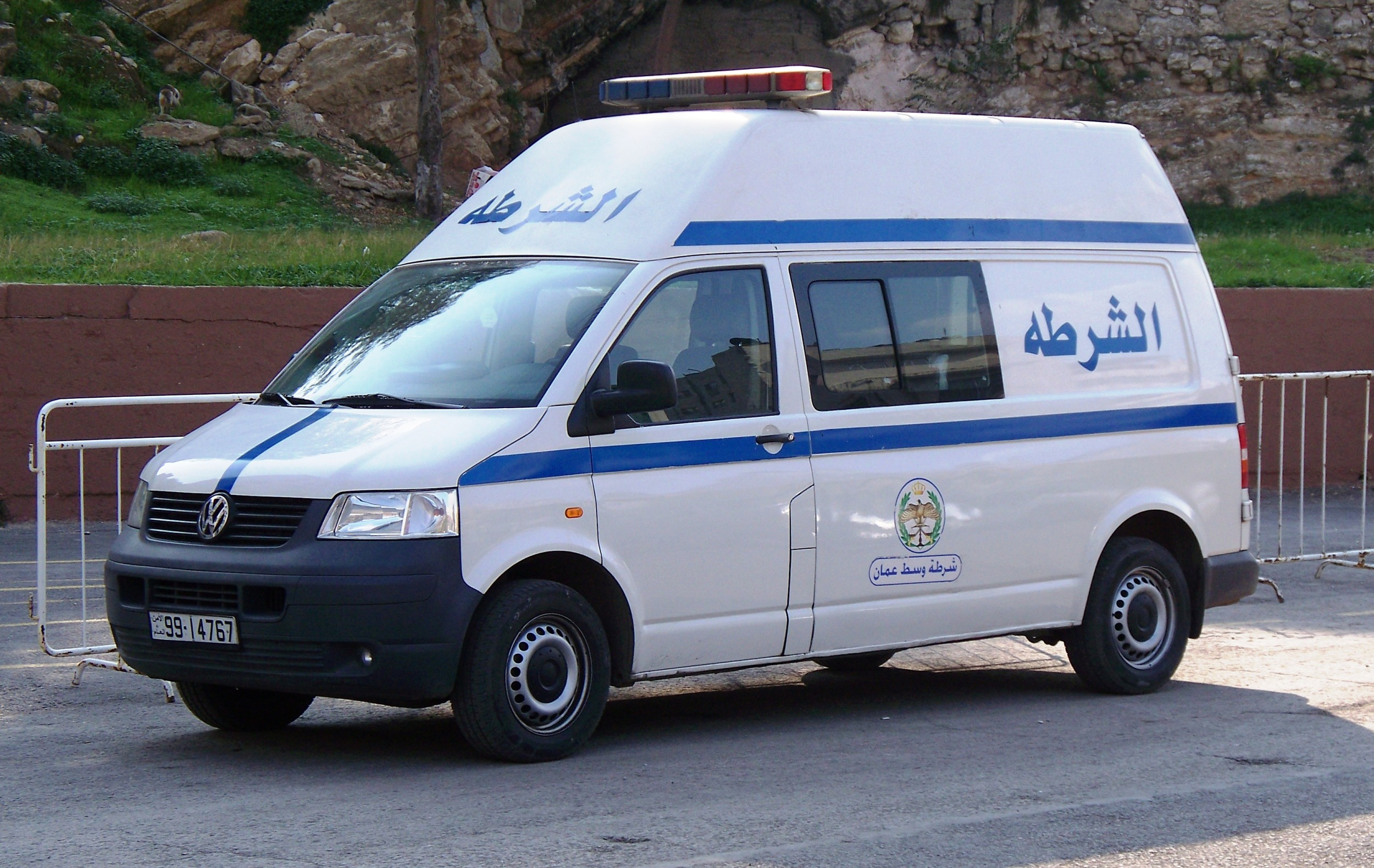
A police vehicle of the Amman Governorate, equivalent to state police in the US

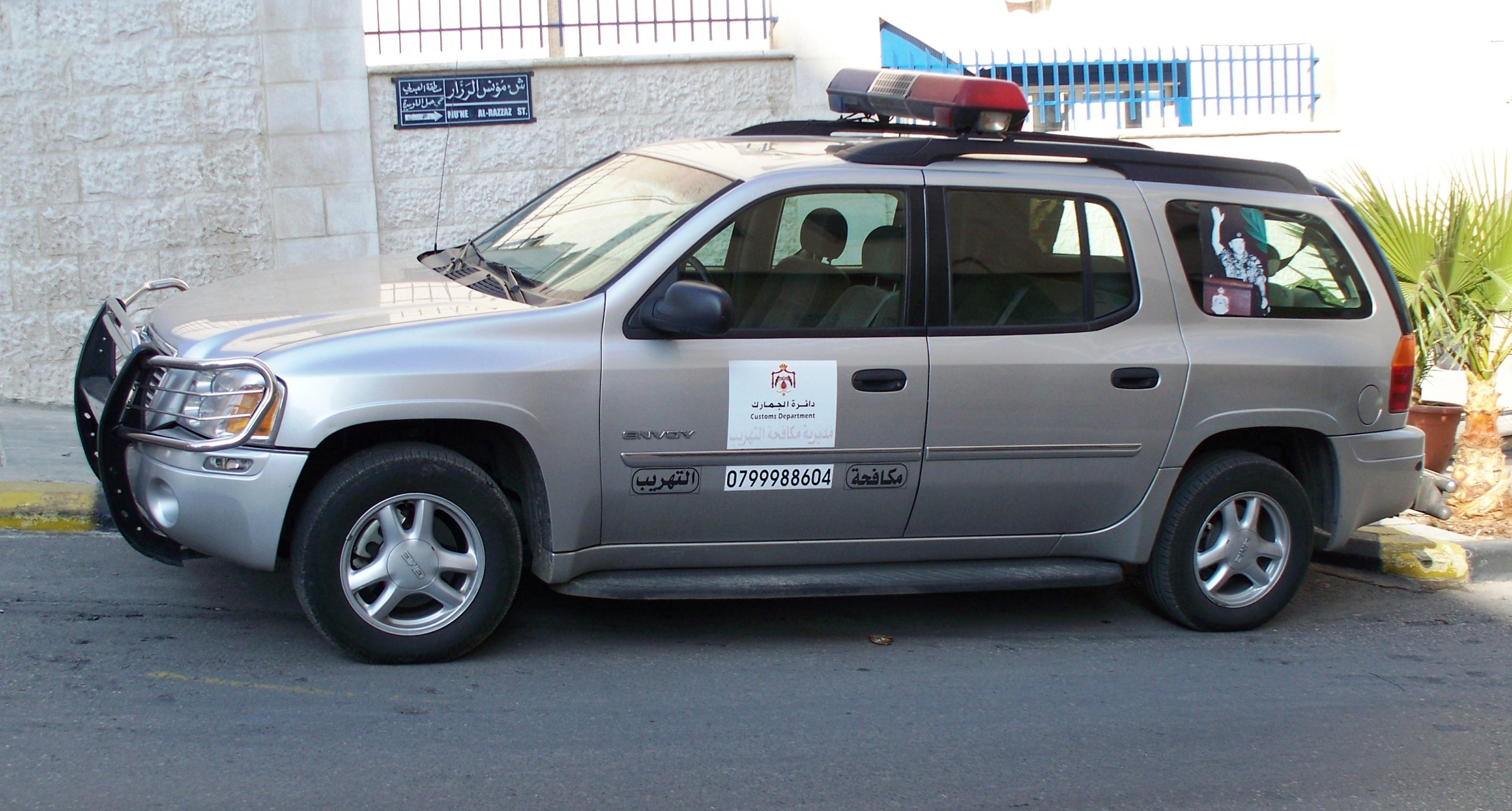
A border patrol vehicle

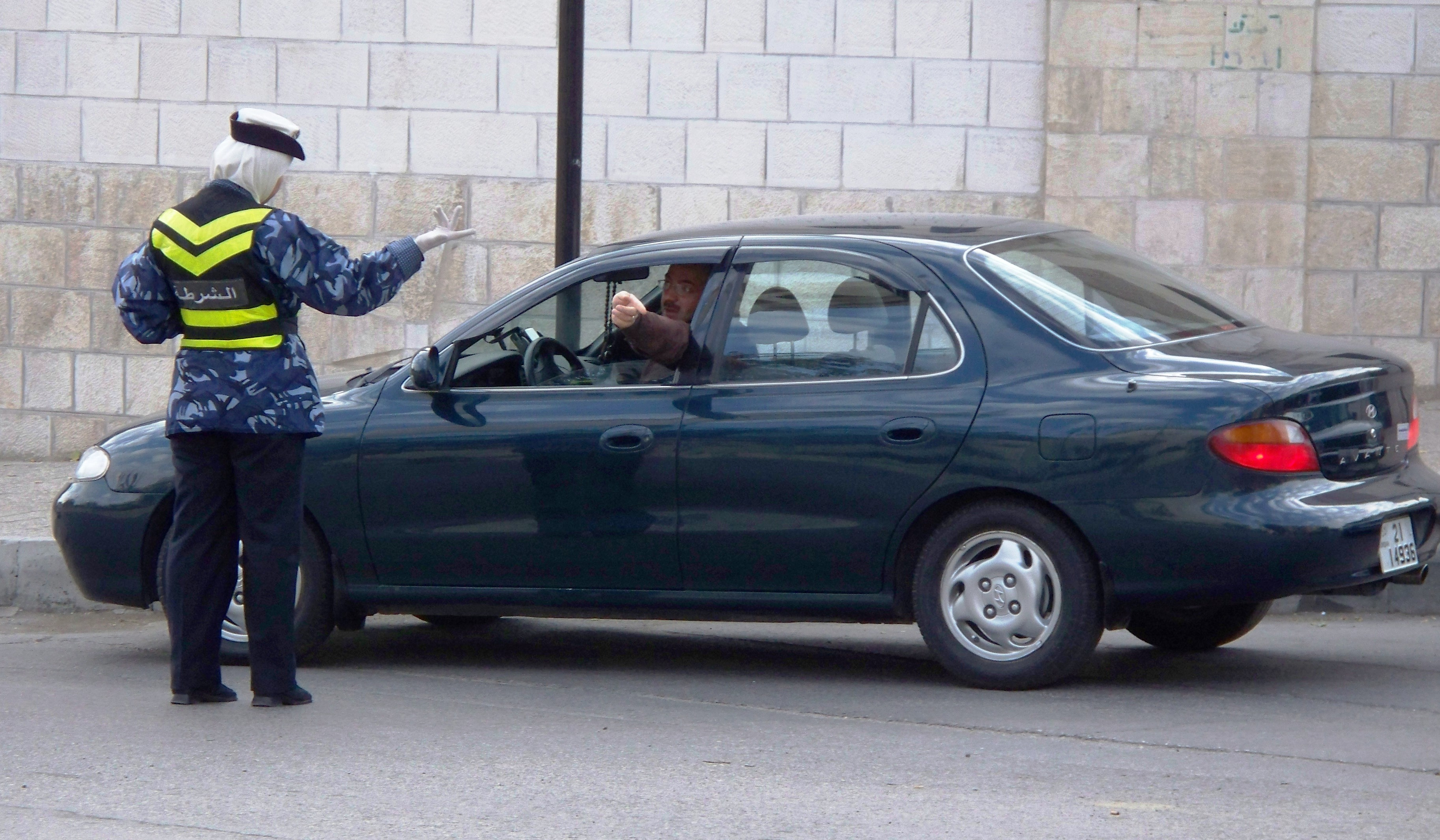
A female police officer in Amman

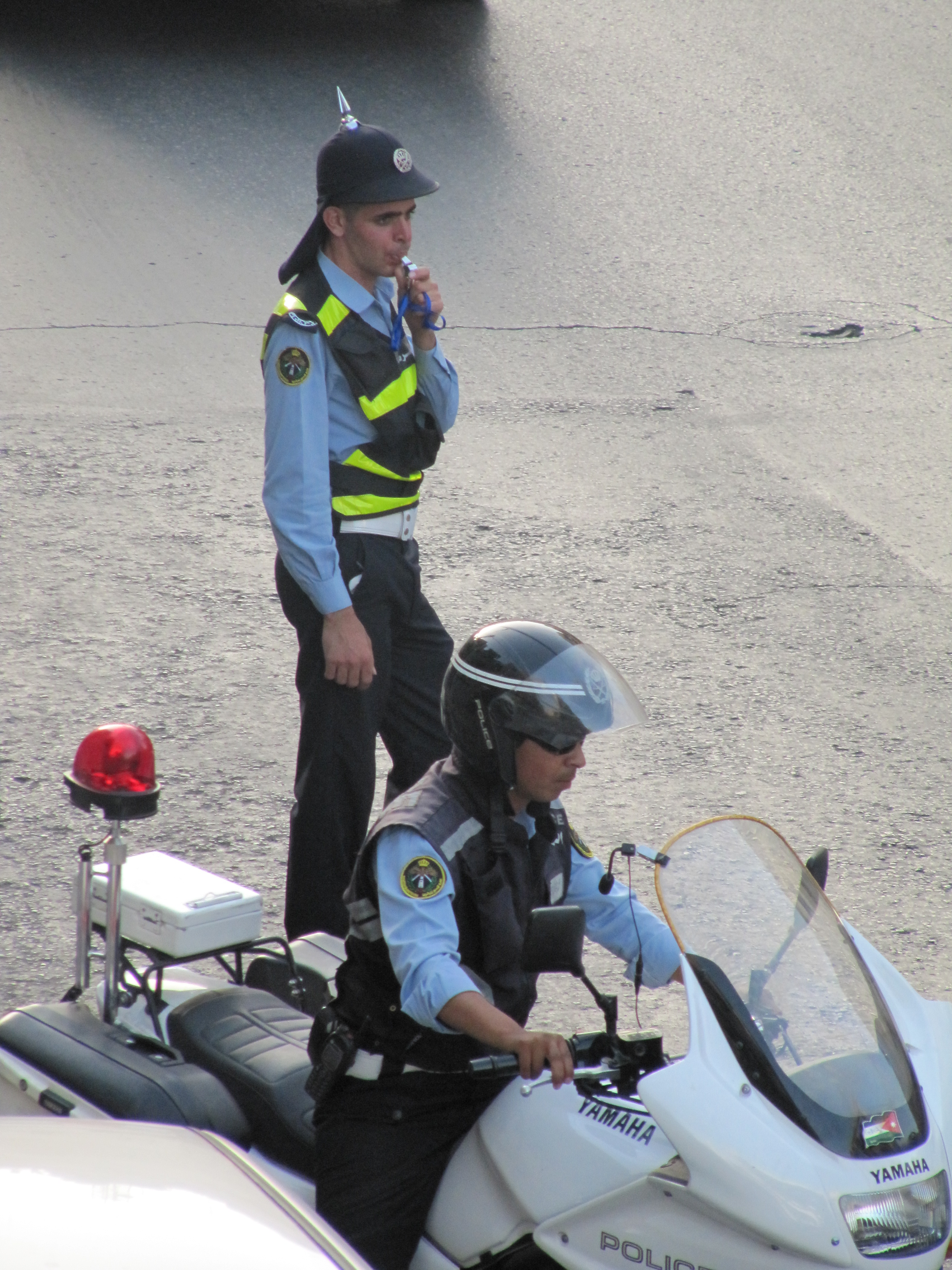
traffic police officers in Amman

Law enforcement in Jordan is the purview of the Public Security Force (includes approximately 50,000 persons), the Jordanian national police, which is subordinate to the Public Security Directorate of the Ministry of Interior.

== History ==
The first police force in the Jordanian state after the fall of the Ottoman Empire was organized on 11 April 1921. Ali Khulqi Pasha Alsharairi was appointed as the first commander of the security force and as a National Security Counsellor (minister) in the first Transjordan government. The first security force was composed of the Gendarmerie Battalion, and the Gendarmerie regiment, the reservist regiment, the regulars, and the desert patrol force.

Until 1956, the police duties were carried totally by the Arab Legion and the Transjordan Frontier Force, after that year the Public Safety Department was established.

== Organization ==
Headquartered in Amman, national police headquarters has responsibility for police, security, and law enforcement activities for the entire country. The police is headed by the General Director of Public Security, traditionally a senior Jordanian Army general, who then reports to the Minister of Interior. Below the central headquarters there are ten regional directorates. Eight of which correspond to the governorates called muhafathat, and one covered Amman and its suburbs. The desert region was a separate directorate and was patrolled by the Desert Police Force.

The operations of the Public Security Force are divided into three major functions:

- Administrative Police: routine crime prevention and the maintenance of public security; additionally special elements of the police perform traffic control, vehicles licensing, licensing of certain business activities, enforcing of trade regulations, enforcing building codes and zoning ordinances, locating missing persons, guarding public places, plus assisting customs and immigration officials. The police also operate Jordan's prison system.
- Judicial Police: conduct of criminal investigations and assistance to the public prosecutor’s office);
- Support Operations: provide training, logistics, public affairs, communication, etc.

Additionally, there are three major structural divisions for the police force:

- metropolitan,
- rural (small towns), and
- Desert Police Force (official name is the Royal Bedouin Police)—also responsible for detecting and preventing drug and gun smuggling, had also been greatly expanded. The Desert Police use camel-mounted as well as four-wheel-drive vehicle patrol.

The Special Security Forces (SSF) used to be separate and elite branch of the Public Security Directorate (PSD) that focused primarily on combating terrorism. It has been taken from the PSD and has become a separate law enforcement agency in Jordan known as "Daraq" which roughly translates to Gendarmerie. This organization is responsible for riot control, direct action/tactical missions, securing foreign diplomatic missions and their diplomats. Daraq is more of a static security force than a traditional law enforcement entity.

Additionally, the General Intelligence Department (GID), generally known as the Mukhabarat from the Arabic name Dairat al Mukhabarat, which reports directly to the king and is responsible for domestic and international security, espionage, and counterterrorist operations.

== Vehicles ==
Vehicle's Name	Type	Picture
Audi A6	Cruiser	
Ford Crown Victoria	Cruiser, Patrol Car	
Kia Cerato	Cruiser	
GMC Envoy	Patrol	
Volkswagen Transporter (T5)	Police van	

== Women ==
Jordan was the first Arab country to recruit women to its police, and opened a women's police academy in Amman in 1972. Before being assigned to positions in law enforcement, the women recruits completed a four-month classroom course followed by one month of practical training in the field. Assignment opportunities expanded steadily after the program began. Women served primarily in the police laboratory, in budgeting and accounting, public relations, licensing, and in prison operations. Some also served in street patrols and traffic control in Amman and in border security.

== Uniforms ==
Ranks and insignia of the Police are identical with those of the army.

Police uniforms are either dark blue military style fatigues, or a light blue shirt and dark blue slacks with either a blue beret (enlisted) or red and blue garrison cap (officers).

The Royal Bedouin Police (also known as the Desert Police Force and a division of the national police) wear an olive drab uniform lighter in shade than that of the army but otherwise similar.

The Desert Police Force retained their traditional Arab garb.
