= 2025 Allenby Bridge shooting =

2025 shooting attack at the Allenby Bridge

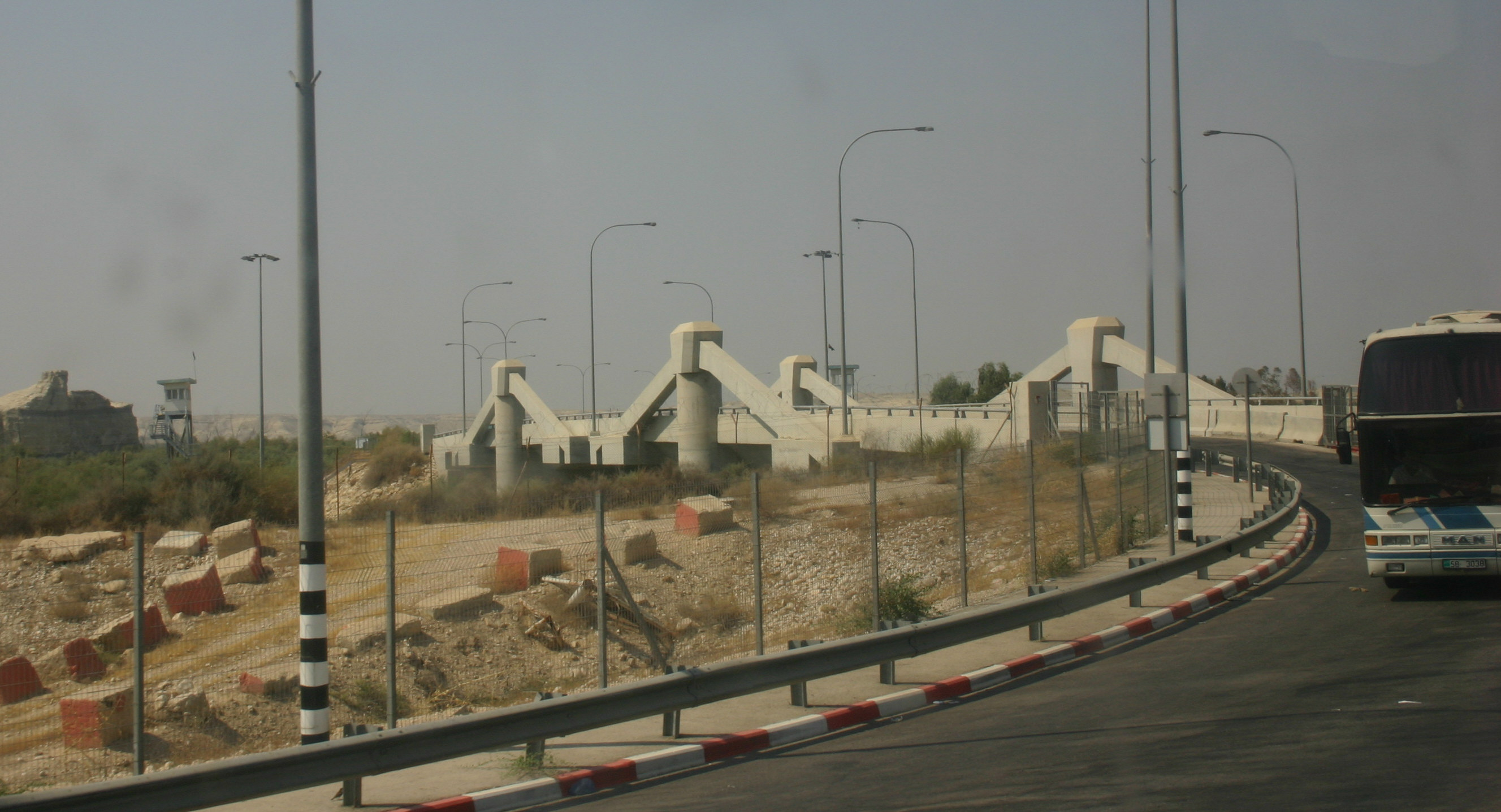
- The Allenby Bridge as seen from the west looking east into Jordan
- Location: Allenby Bridge Border crossing
- Date: September 18, 2025
- Target: Israel Defence Forces
- Attack type: Shooting
- Weapon: Assault rifle
- Deaths: 3 (including the perpetrator)
- Perpetrator: Abdul Muttalib Al-Qaisi

On September 18, 2025, two Israelis were killed in a shooting attack at the Allenby Bridge border crossing between the West Bank and Jordan. The shooter opened fire at Israeli personnel in the cargo terminal. Israeli security forces returned fire and killed the assailant. The victims were identified as 68-year-old Lieutenant Colonel Yitzhak Harosh and 20-year-old Sergeant Oran Hershko. The attack occurred just over a year after the 2024 Allenby Bridge shooting, in which three Israeli border workers were killed by a Jordanian humanitarian aid truck driver at the same crossing.

The attacker was identified by Jordan's foreign ministry as 57-year-old civilian Abdul Muttalib Al-Qaisi who was reported to have crossed from the Jordanian side of the terminal while driving a truck carrying humanitarian aid intended for residents of Gaza. Al-Qaisi began working to deliver aid to Gaza three months before the attack.

Israel indefinitely closed the bridge on September 24, days after reopening it following the shooting.
