= 2024 Neot HaKikar ambush =

Militant attack in southern Israel

- Part of the spillover of the Gaza war
Date	18 October, 2024
Location	Neot HaKikar, Israel

Belligerents
Islamic Resistance in Jordan	Israel

Units involved
Islamic Resistance in Jordan	Israel Defense Forces; Israeli Air Force

Strength
3 militants	(Israel) Unknown

Casualties and losses
2 killed	(Israel) 2 injured

On 18 October 2024, at least two militants infiltrated Israel from Jordan in the Neot HaKikar area, a moshav located in the Arabah valley just south of the Dead Sea. The militants ambushed Israeli troops and opened fire on them, wounding two of them moderately. Israeli troops killed two of the militants during a firefight, with a third attacker probably escaping. Residents of Neot HaKikar were instructed to remain indoors as the troops and police searched for the third militant.

The Muslim Brotherhood in Jordan identified the two deceased attackers, Hussam Abu Ghazaleh and Amer Qawoos, as members of their group. Palestinian Islamist group Hamas praised the attack, that occurred just a few hours after Israeli troops killed their leader, Yahya Sinwar, in Rafah.

== Background ==
Relations between Israel and Jordan, which signed a peace treaty in 1994, have been tense since the start of the Gaza war in October 2023, with Jordan having recalled its ambassador to Israel. Nonetheless, in some respects, security cooperation remained close; in April 2024, Jordan helped Israel in shooting down Iranian missiles launched against Israel.

The Israeli-Jordanian border has remained largely calm since the peace treaty, experiencing only limited incidents like the one on September 8, 2024, a month before the Neot HaKikar attack, when a Jordanian truck driver carried out a shooting attack at the Allenby Bridge, a border terminal between Jordan and the Israeli-occupied West Bank, killing three Israeli civilians employed at the terminal. The perpetrator was shot and killed by Israeli security forces. Jordan identified the attacker as one of its citizens, named Maher Al-Jazy, while condemning attacks against civilians and calling for de-escalation. On the streets in Jordan, some citizens gathered to celebrate the attack, amid widespread anger over the war.

== The attack ==
On 18 October 2024, at least two gunmen infiltrated Israel from Jordan near Neot HaKikar in the Arava valley, south of the Dead Sea. The gunmen, who were clad in military uniform, ambushed Israeli troops and opened fire, wounding an IDF soldier and a reservist moderately. The IDF promptly responded and killed two of the gunmen. According to police, the gunmen attempted to enter Moshav Neot HaKikar, but were stopped by the army and the community's security squad. Residents of Neot HaKikar were instructed to remain indoors while the IDF and police, in collaboration with the Israeli Air Force, began searching for a third gunman who probably escaped. Militants killed by the IDF have been linked to the Islamic Resistance in Jordan, a clandestine militant organization in Jordan, fostered by Kata'ib Hezbollah.

== Reactions ==
=== Jordan ===
The Muslim Brotherhood in Jordan claimed the two killed attackers as members of their group, saying they "always participated in events in solidarity with Gaza and in support of the resistance." Muslim Brotherhood spokesman Moath al-Khawaldeh named the two as Hussam Abu Ghazaleh and Amer Qawoos.

=== Palestine ===
The leadership of Palestinian group Hamas in Qatar, commended the shooting attack "targeting soldiers of the Zionist occupation army," adding in a statement that it "confirms" the continued Arab support for their cause.

== See also ==
- Killing of Yahya Sinwar
- 2024 Allenby Bridge shooting
- Israel–Jordan peace treaty
- 2023 Egypt–Israel border shooting incident
