= Islamic Resistance in Jordan =

Jordanian Militant Group

- المقاومة الإسلامية في الأردن
- Country: Jordan
- Part of: Axis of Resistance
- Wars: Gaza war: 2024 Allenby Bridge shooting; 2024 Neot HaKikar shooting

The Islamic Resistance in Jordan (Arabic: المقاومة الإسلامية في الأردن) is a clandestine militant organization in Jordan, fostered by Kataib Hezbollah in April 2024.

== History ==
The group is believed to have been established following the Israeli airstrike on the Iranian consulate in Damascus, and the ensuing death of IRGC commander Mohammad Reza Zahedi. Immediately following the airstrike, Abu Ali al-Askari, the security chief of Iraq’s Kata'ib Hezbollah, stated that the organization was prepared to arm "Islamic Resistance" in Jordan and is ready to provide "12,000 fighters with light and medium weapons, anti-armor launchers, tactical missiles, millions of rounds of ammunition, and tons of explosives" to "defend the Palestinians and avenge the honour of Muslims." The day after this announcement, the Hezbollah-affiliated Lebanese newspaper Al Akhbar devoted its front page to mass demonstrations that had been taking place in Jordan in support of Hamas, with the title "The Jordan Flood - A New Resistance Front."

On the morning of September 8, 2024, a Jordanian truck driver carried out a shooting attack at the border terminal adjacent to the Allenby Bridge connecting Jordan to the Israeli-occupied West Bank, killing three Israeli civilian border workers. Following the Allenby Bridge shooting, Kata'ib Hezbollah congratulated the Islamic Resistance in Jordan for the operation.

On October 8, 2024, at least two militants, allegedly linked to the Islamic Resistance in Jordan, infiltrated Israel from Jordan in the Neot HaKikar area, a moshav located in the Arabah valley just south of the Dead Sea. The militants ambushed Israeli troops and opened fire on them, wounding two of them moderately. Israeli troops killed two of the militants during a firefight, with a third attacker probably escaping. Following the Neot HaKikar shooting, leaders of Hamas in Qatar praised the attack.

Two days following the Allenby Bridge attack, the 2024 Jordanian general election was held, wherein the Muslim Brotherhood backed party, the Islamic Action Front (IAF) won a plurality of seats in the Jordanian Parliament. The Muslim Brotherhood in Jordan was banned on April 23, 2025 following an alleged sabotage plot by Brotherhood members who had allegedly been trained and financed in Lebanon and were plotting attacks involving rockets and drones on targets inside Jordan. The IAF's offices were raided as a result, but the IAF itself was not banned and it still holds 31 out of the 138 seats in parliament.

== Reception ==
The group is believed to be part of efforts by the Axis of Resistance to expand operations into Jordan, with the aim of enabling attacks against bordering Israel and providing support to Palestinian factions in the West Bank, escalating the area's ongoing insurgency.

== See also ==
- Islamic Resistance in Iraq
- Axis of Resistance
