= 2017 Israeli embassy in Amman incident =

2017 Amman incident
- Part of 2017 Temple Mount crisis and Israeli–Palestinian conflict
- Location: Amman, Jordan
- Date: 23 July 2017 (UTC+2)
- Target: Residential apartment in or near Israeli embassy compound
- Weapon: Screwdriver
- Deaths: 2 (including the attacker)
- Injuries: 1
- Perpetrator: Mohammed Jawawdeh

On 23 July 2017, an incident involved the deputy director of security of the Israeli embassy in Amman, Jordan who shot and killed two Jordanians in an apartment belonging to the embassy.

According to Israel, the official was attacked with a screwdriver, who then shot and killed the attacker, as well as the Jordanian landlord by mistake. The attacker was a carpenter who came to install furniture at an apartment rented by the embassy either inside or near the Israeli embassy compound. (Note: Different sources place the apartment in the embassy, as part of the fortified embassy compound, or near the compound.)

According to Jordan's Public Security Directorate its investigation concluded that the cause of the initial altercation was a dispute over late delivery of furniture. Israel denies this.

== Background ==
Tensions between Israel and Jordan were high following the 2017 Temple Mount shooting on 14 July, new security measures, and rioting following the shooting. The spokesperson for the Jordanian government condemned Israel's closure of the Temple Mount and the Al-Aqsa mosque and called on them to reopen it immediately to worshipers. Subsequently, following criticism of Israel for not doing so, King Abdullah II in a phone call on 16 July with Israeli prime minister Benjamin Netanyahu condemned the attack, called for calm, and reopening of Al-Aqsa. On 16 July the parliament of Jordan criticized the Temple Mount closure and held a prayer service in honor of the attackers. Atef Tarawneh, the Speaker of the House of Representatives praised the attackers, calling them "martyrs who were defending Palestinians", while also blaming "Israeli occupation" as the reason for the attack.

On Friday 21 July, a protest was held in Amman by Islamist and leftist groups against the new security measures on the Temple Mount.

== Shooting ==
On 23 July, the deputy director of security of the Israeli embassy in Amman, Jordan was attacked with a screwdriver. The official then shot and killed the attacker. A Jordanian landlord was also inadvertently shot and later pronounced dead. The attacker was a carpenter who came to install furniture at an apartment rented by the embassy either inside or near the Israeli embassy compound.

The attacker was identified as 17-year-old Mohammed Jawawdeh, and the landlord Christian orthopaedic surgeon Bashar Hamarneh.

== Diplomatic showdown ==
Jordan refused to allow the evacuation of the Israeli embassy personnel, leading to a diplomatic crisis. Citing the Vienna Convention on Diplomatic Relations, Israel refused any investigation of the security officer. 30 Israeli embassy staff, including the wounded guard remained in the embassy that was surrounded by Jordanian forces.

On the evening of 24 July, a phone call was held between Benjamin Netanyahu and Abdullah II of Jordan in which the king asked that the metal detectors be removed from the Temple Mount. Later that evening Jordan permitted the embassy staff including the injured security officer to return to Israel. Haaretz reported that the staff was allowed to leave after he had given an account of the incident to the Jordanian authorities in the presence of embassy staff. Later that night, Israeli authorities removed metal detectors from the entrance to the Temple Mount.

According to a report from 27 July in the Jordanian newspaper Al-Rad, Jordan is refusing to allow the return of the Israeli ambassador and her staff to Jordan unless Israel provides official guarantees that the security officer will be put on trial. Later in the day King Abdullah II denounced Netanyahu's behavior and called for the security officer to stand trial. While conveying royal condolences to the family of the attacker, the Jordanian monarch's representatives states that Jordan views both the attack and the killing of the attacker and as a crime.

== Investigation ==
The Jordanian and Israeli investigations differ. According to Jordan's Public Security Directorate's investigation, the Jordanian teen attacked the Israeli security officer and wounded him, following a verbal argument over the late delivery of furniture. The wounded Israeli security then shot at the attacker.

On the other hand, Ziv the Israeli security guard claimed that the attack was nationalistically motivated. Israeli political sources told Ynet that according to an initial investigation it appears the security guard behaved properly under the circumstances. The security guard was stabbed three times, twice in the back and once in the chest. The sources also said that the landlord was hit after Ziv tripped when the attacker crept up behind him. Ynet claimed that Israel apologized to the Jordanians for his death and will pay the family financial compensation. However, no public apology was issued.

== Aftermath ==
Concurrent to attempting to evacuate the Israeli diplomatic mission, the event was under gag order by the Israeli Military Censor during the evening and night of the incident.

Jewish ultra-orthodox pilgrims to Tomb of Aaron in Jordan claimed that on the night of the incident, Jordanian police allegedly raided the hotel they were staying in, and forbade the group members to pray saying that Jewish prayer is forbidden in Jordan, threatening the tourists with arrest should they pray. Further, the Jordanians are said to have confiscated religious paraphernalia such as tefillin and Tallitot. Some 20 members of the group were forbidden by police to leave their hotel. The Israeli foreign ministry said they were in contact with the group and had advised them to keep a low profile.

In November 2017 Israel reportedly threatened to shelve the Red Sea–Dead Sea Water Conveyance project until the embassy was reopened. Jordanian Media Affairs Minister Mohammed Momani stated Jordan would not allow the reopening of the embassy until the security guard was brought to trial.

== Reactions ==
The family of the attacker staged a protest in Amman in the night following the incident, calling for the death penalty to be applied against the Israeli security official and the expulsion of the Israeli ambassador. In response, Oren Hazan, a member of the Israeli Knesset tweeted "our neighbors from east to the Jordan [river], who we protect their behinds day and night, and give water to, need some re-education. It's starting to feel like a goodbye."

The family of the attacker (Jawawdeh) demanded that the death penalty be imposed on the Israeli deputy. The attacker's father described him as a "martyr", although he was not sure if his son would carry out a politically motivated attack.

During the funeral of the attacker on 25 July that took place in the Al-Wihdat Palestinian refugee camp, the crowd chanted "Death to Israel". The flag of Israel was painted on the ground before entrance to the mourning tent of Jawawdah, so that mourners would step on the flag prior to entering the tent. The father of the attacker, Zakaria Jawawdah, said he was willing to rescind his demands for an investigation if Israel removed security measures at the Temple Mount. The family of the doctor Hamarneh, also placed an Israeli flag in front of the church where a funeral was held.

Jordanian Foreign minister Ayman Safadi said in an interview with CNN on 26 July "Absurd [are] some of the reactions that are coming of Israel which are trying to show this as if the ambassador and the suspect were under siege and were somehow liberated and celebrating them as heroes coming back home. This is really absurd. This is a criminal case and I think it is in everybody’s interest that it is pursued as such." "Jordan acted legally and morally [by complying to international laws on diplomatic mission]. It is upon Israel to do the same and allow for justice to take its course and to stop provocative behaviours that distort the facts here."

Protestors in Amman gathered around the embassy on Friday 28 July, some shouting "death to Israel" and demanding the cancellation of the peace treaty with Israel. Jordanian security forces tried to disperse the protesters that wanted to see the official face trial.

== See also ==
- Killing of Raed Zeiter
