= General Directorate of Gendarmerie =

Jordanian Public security agency

Coordinates: 32.040396°N 35.920132°E

General Directorate of Gendarmerie المديرية العامة لقوات الدرك
- Abbreviation: GDG

Agency overview
- Formed: July 10, 2008
- Employees: Approx. 15,000
- Annual budget: $350 million (2016 est.)

Jurisdictional structure
- National agency: Jordan
- Operations jurisdiction: Jordan
- Governing body: Government of Jordan
- General nature: Gendarmerie

Operational structure
- Headquarters: Amman, Jordan
- Minister responsible: Sameer Mubaidin
- Agency executive: Hussein Al-Hawatmeh, Director General
- Parent agency: Ministry of Interior

Website
- http://www.jdf.gov.jo

The General Directorate of Gendarmerie (GDG) or Darak forces (Arabic: المديرية العامة لقوات الدرك) is a public security agency of the Hashemite Kingdom of Jordan, which lies under the jurisdiction of the country's Ministry of Interior. The Directorate was formed by a Royal decree in 2008, and is tasked with maintaining security and order in the country.

== History ==
In 1946, the Gendarmerie was integrated into the police. In 2008, the GDG was established from units from the Public Security Directorate including the Special Security Forces (SSF) and Air Unit.
