= Ministry of Interior (Jordan) =

Government ministry of Jordan

Hashemite Kingdom of Jordan Ministry of Interior
- Logo of the Jordanian Ministry of Interior

Ministerial Department overview
- Formed: 1921
- Jurisdiction: Government of Jordan
- Headquarters: Amman, Jordan
- Minister responsible: Mazin Abdellah Hilal Al Farrayeh, Minister
- Child agencies: Public Security Directorate; General Directorate of Gendarmerie; Civil Defense Directorate; Civil Status and Passports Department
- Website: https://moi.gov.jo/Default/En

The Ministry of Interior of the Hashemite Kingdom of Jordan (Arabic: وزارة الداخلية) is the ministry in the Government of Jordan. Established in 1921, at the time of the establishment of the Emirate of Transjordan, it is responsible for law enforcement in Jordan. On 7 March 2020, Mazin Abdellah Hilal Al Farrayeh was appointed minister by Prime Minister Bisher Al-Khasawneh.

The Ministry of Interior directs the Public Security Directorate; around 50,000 in 2016, the General Directorate of Gendarmerie, the Civil Defense Directorate and the Civil Status and Passports Department.
