= Civil Defense Directorate =

Civil defense agency of the Government of Jordan

- المديرية العامة للدفاع المدني
- Official logo of the CDD

Directorate overview
- Formed: January 1, 1956
- Jurisdiction: Government of Jordan
- Headquarters: Amman, Jordan; 31°57′59.57″N 35°54′6.19″E
- Annual budget: $300 million (2016 est.)
- Minister responsible: Sameer Mubaidin
- Directorate executive: Mustafa Al-Zabay'a, Director General
- Parent department: Ministry of Interior
- Website: www.cdd.gov.jo

The Civil Defense Directorate provides civil defense and emergency services in the Hashemite Kingdom of Jordan. The Directorate was established in 1956, and lies under the jurisdiction of the country's Ministry of Interior.
