= Killing of Raed Zeiter =

Raed Zeiter (Arabic: رائد زعيتر; c. 1976 – 10 March 2014) was a Jordanian judge who was shot dead by Israeli soldiers on 10 March 2014 at the Allenby Bridge border crossing between the Israeli-occupied West Bank and Jordan.

Involved Israeli soldiers claimed that Zeiter had tried to snatch a weapon from a soldier and had also attacked them with a metal pole, an account that was disputed by a witness speaking to the international news media as well as representatives of the government of Jordan, among others. The event became an international incident, with Israel formally issuing a statement of regret.

== Background and incident details ==
The 38-year-old Raed Zeiter worked as a judge at a magistrates court in Jordan while his hometown was Nablus. Israeli soldiers remarked that he had charged at them with a metal pole, which was disputed by a witness who stated that Zeiter and the soldiers had been arguing before Zeiter was shoved down and shot. The incident occurred at the Allenby Bridge crossing between the Palestinian territories and the nation of Jordan. While the border crossing procedures there are usually recorded, the army later said that the cameras on site had malfunctioned.

According to The New York Times, the crossing had very rarely seen acts of violence before. The bridge area is jointly administered by both Jordan and Israel.

== Reactions ==
Zeiter's father and Jordanian government officials such as Information Minister Mohammad Momani called shortly after the incident for investigations and for the arrest of the border agents involved. "My son was unarmed, he wouldn't even know how to use a weapon," Ala Zeiter said. The Israeli military stated that it had conducted a "comprehensive investigation" to support their view of the incident, including the questioning of multiple witnesses.

Jordan's principal Islamist party condemned what it viewed as Israeli "brutality". Murad Adaileh of the Islamic Action Front said in a statement that "the Zionist enemy does not respect any agreements" and that the "aggression against the Jordanian citizen shows the brutality of the Zionist occupation." Approximately 1000 protesters demonstrated outside the Israeli embassy in Amman, Jordan and called for expelling the Israeli ambassador. Many of them declared, "Down with the peace agreement!"

The Palestinian Authority publicly advocated for an international investigation into the incident. "Israel regrets the death of Judge Raed Zeiter yesterday at the King Hussein (Allenby) bridge and expresses its sympathies to the people and government of Jordan," Prime Minister Benjamin Netanyahu’s office declared in a statement.

== Funeral ==
Hundreds of Palestinians and Jordanians turned out for Zeiter's funeral. His casket wrapped in both a Jordanian flag and a Palestinian flag, his family buried him in their hometown of Nablus.

== Compensation ==
Israel paid compensation for the killing of Zeiter in 2018, after another incident that saw an Israeli embassy guard killing two Jordanians at the Israeli embassy in Amman. The total compensation for the three victims was reported to be five million dollars.

== See also ==
- 2014 in Palestine
- 2017 Israeli embassy in Amman incident
- Allenby Bridge
- Israeli-Palestine conflict
- Timeline of the Israeli-Palestinian conflict
