= Mazin Al-Farrayeh =

Jordanian General and politician (born 1969)

His Excellency Mazen Al-Farrayeh
- مازن الفراية
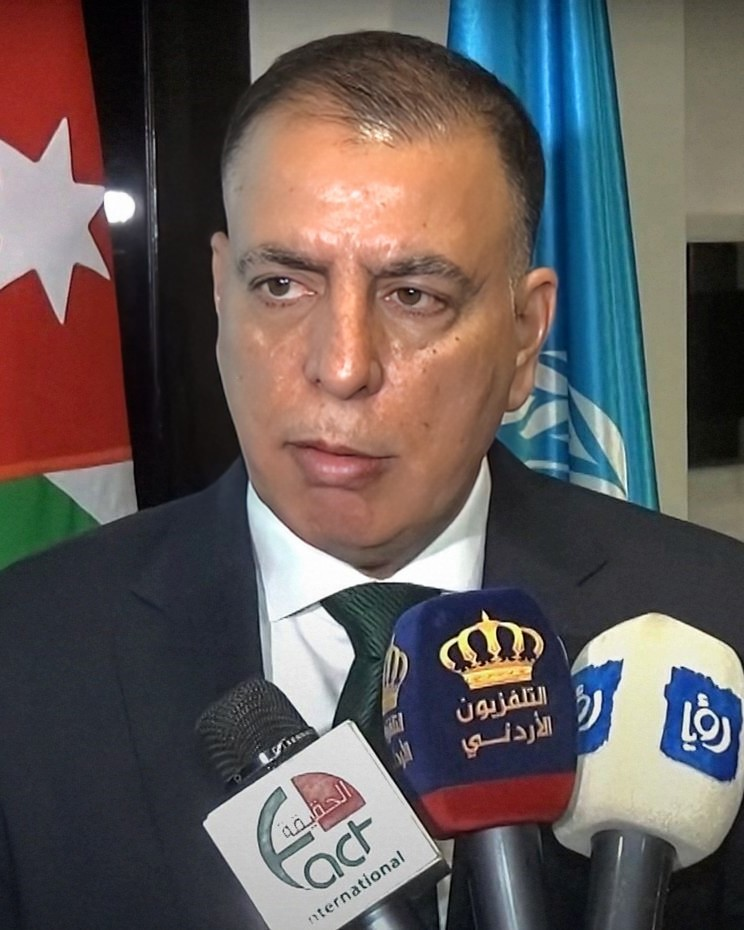
- Al-Farrayeh in 2023

Minister of Interior
- Incumbent
- Assumed office 7 March 2021
- Monarch: Abdullah II of Jordan
- Prime Minister: Bisher Al-Khasawneh
- Preceded by: Sameer Mubaidin

Personal details
- Born: Mazen Abdellah Hilal al-Frayeh; 1969 (age 56–57)
- Education: Mutah University (BA); United States Army War College (MA)

Mazen Abdellah Hilal al-Frayeh (born 1969) is the Jordanian Minister of Interior. He was appointed as minister on 7 March 2021.

== Education ==
Frayeh holds a Bachelor in Public Administration and a Bachelor in Military Sciences from Mutah University. In addition, he holds a Master in Military Sciences from Mubarak al-Abdullah Joint Command and Staff College and a Master in Strategic Studies from the United States Army War College.

== Career ==
Frayeh was the Vice-Chairman of the National Center for Security and Crisis Management.

Additionally, he was Director of Operations at the General Command and served in the artillery corps of the Jordanian Armed Forces for 25 years and was an instructor and coordination officer at the Royal School of Artillery.

Frayeh was appointed the Director of Operations of the Jordanian crisis cell to deal with the COVID-19 pandemic.

Since 7 March 2020, Frayeh has been the Minister of Interior.
