= Ali Khulqi Sharayri =

Jordanian politician (1878–1960)

Ali Khulqi bin Hussein Alsharairi
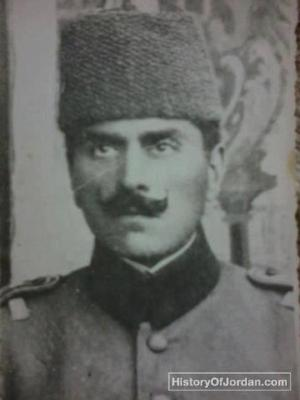

Minister of Education
- In office 5 September 1923 – 7 May 1924

Minister of Security and Order
- In office 11 April 1921 – 23 June 1921

Personal details
- Born: 1878
- Died: 25 June 1960
- Education: Turkish Military Academy
- Website: www.pm.gov.jo

Ali Khulqi Alsharairi (Arabic: علي خلقي الشرايري; * 1878 in Irbid, Jordan; died 25 June 1960) is Ali bin Hussein Alsharairi was one of the first Jordanian politicians. As an experienced military man and a politician, he contributed significantly to the establishment of the Emirate of Transjordan.

== Youth and Education ==
In his early life, Ali assisted his father in agriculture and received his primary education in Irbid. Ali Khulqi's realised later that he needed to develop further and decided to travel to Damascus to enroll in the local military academy. After he had successfully completed his studies there, he graduated in 1895. He pursued his studies at the Turkish Military Academy, where he received an officer rank to join the Ottoman army. Later he became a Mirliva.

== Political life ==
After the collapse of Ottoman Empire, Ali joined the Great Arab Revolt and later formed a local government in Ajloun in 1920 until Emir Abdullah I ibn al-Hussain ruled as Emir of Trans-Jordan in 1921. Ali Khulqi Alsharairi served in the first Jordanian government in 1921 as a Minister of Security and Order then as Minister of Education 1923-1924.

== Al-Sharayri clan ==
Al Sharayri clan is one of the prominent families of the city of Irbid, or the so-called the Pearls of Irbid, referring to those few families that have had their own water wells that time. Al-Sharayri hails from the tribe of Bali, which has roots in Hijaz, what is now Saudi Arabia. Many of its members contributed greatly to their community in the early years of the Jordanian state such as:

- Mr Sa'id Hassan Al-Sharayri, the first Mayor of the city of Irbid in 1891.
- Dr Ahmad Al-Sharayri, one of the first known physicians in Jordan.
- Mr Ibrahim Al-Sharayri, one of the first lawyers and prominent judges in Jordan.

Dr. Khaled Al- Sharayri is a prominent public figure in Jordan.

== Sources ==
- مجلة رسالة الأردن, عدد15, ايلول . 1960م الكاتب : تيسير ظبيان
- مجلة رسالة الأردن, عدد4, شباط, 1959م الكاتب : سليمان الموسى
- الكاتب : سليمان الموسى وجوه وملامح, وزارة الثقافة, عمان, 1980 -الجزء الأول -ص: 12 - 44
