= Allenby Bridge =

Jordan–West Bank border crossing

Allenby Bridge King Hussein Bridge: גשר אלנבי; جسر الملك حسين
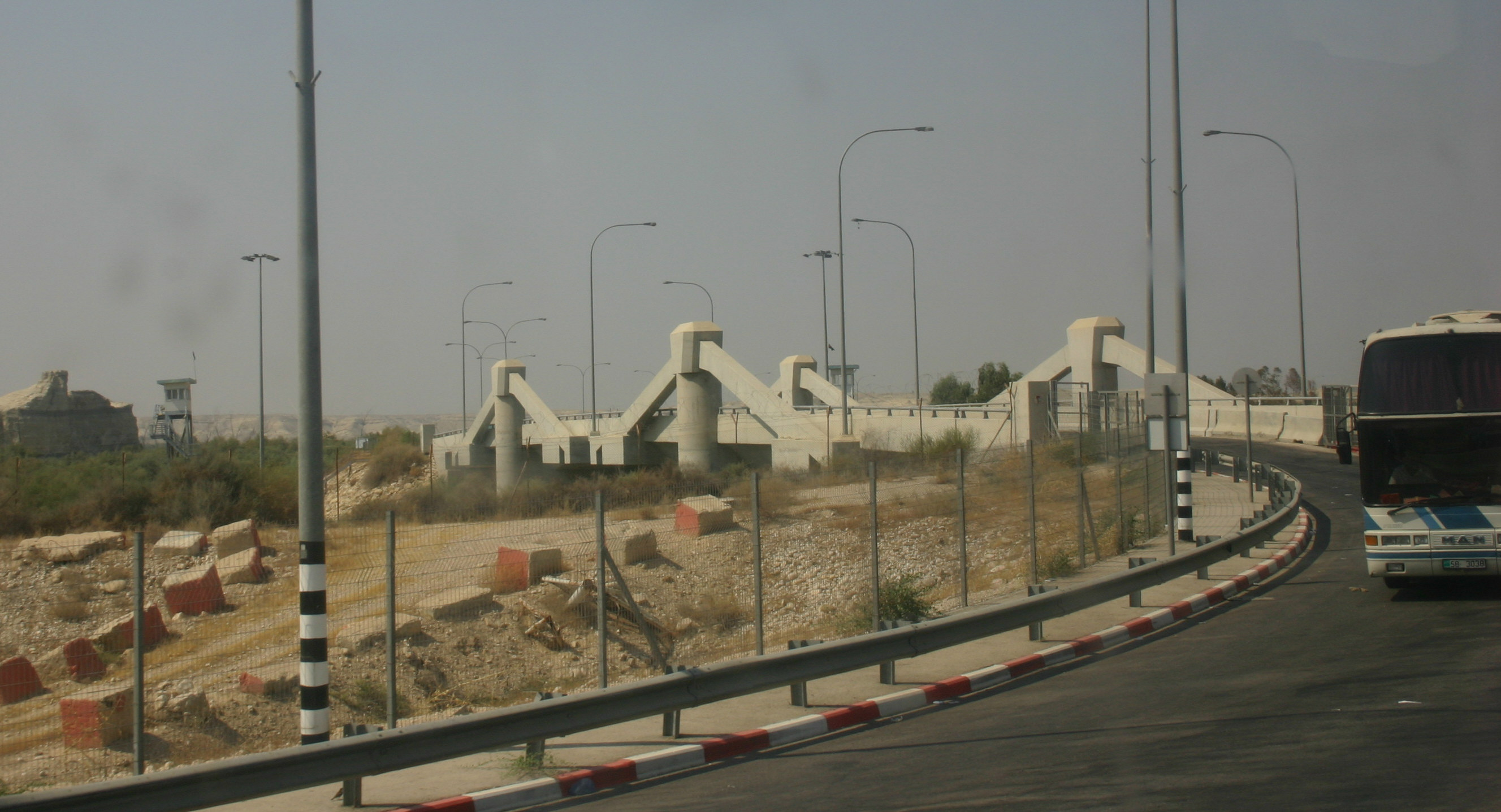
- The Allenby Bridge from the Jordanian side, 2006
- Coordinates: 31°52′27″N 35°32′27″E
- Carries: Pedestrians, vehicles
- Crosses: Jordan River
- Locale: Balqa Governorate (Jordan); Jericho Governorate (Palestine)
- Named for: Edmund Allenby; King Hussein
- Maintained by: Israel Airports Authority (West Bank side); Public Security Directorate (Jordanian side)

History
- Construction start: 1918
- Opened: 1994
- Rebuilt: 1968, 1994

Statistics
- Daily traffic: 3200 pedestrians and 33 trucks (2007)
- Toll: ₪197.00 (outbound West Bank); ₪172.00 (outbound West Bank - Palestinians only); JD 10.00 (outbound Jordan)

Location
- Location of the Allenby Bridge at West Bank-Jordan border

The Allenby Bridge (Hebrew: גשר אלנבי, romanized: Gesher Allenby), known officially in Jordan as the King Hussein Bridge (Arabic: جسر الملك حسين, romanized: Jisr al-Malek Hussein), is a bridge that crosses the Jordan River near the city of Jericho in the West Bank and the town of Al-Karameh in Jordan.

The bridge is currently the only official border crossing between the West Bank and Jordan, and is the sole designated exit/entry point for West Bank Palestinians travelling abroad by land.

Being 381 metres (1,250 ft) below sea level, it is the lowest fixed water crossing in the world.

== Etymology ==
The bridge is informally called the Al-Karameh Bridge (جسر الكرامة) or simply Al-Jisr (الجسر, lit. 'the bridge') by Palestinians.

== History ==
In 1885, the Ottoman government of the Mutasarrifate of Jerusalem built a bridge at this site.

In 1918, British general Edmund Allenby built a bridge over the remnant of the Ottoman predecessor. The 1922 census lists 12 people (8 Christians and 4 Muslims) living at the bridge. It was first destroyed by the 1927 Jericho earthquake, when it fell apart and collapsed into the river. The 1931 census lists 13 people (11 Muslims and 2 Christians) living at the bridge.

It was destroyed again in the Night of the Bridges operation by the Palmach on 16 June 1946, thus severing one of the main overland connections between Mandatory Palestine and Transjordan.

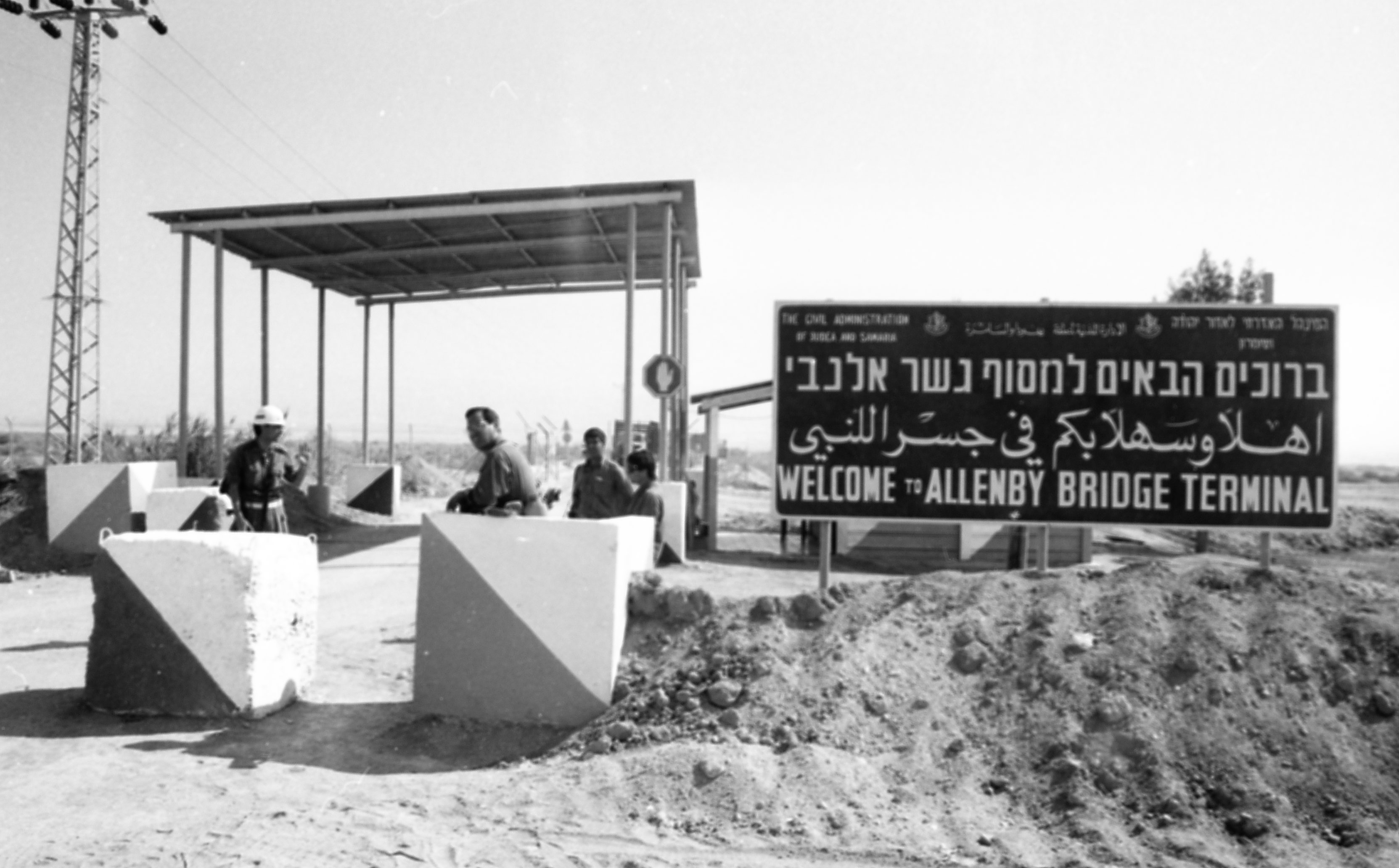
Israeli soldiers occupying the Palestine side of Allenby Border Crossing, 1985

The next destruction occurred during the 1967 Six-Day War, after which was replaced in 1968 with a temporary truss-type bridge. In 1994, subsequent to the Israel-Jordan peace treaty, a new modern paved crossing was constructed adjacent to the older wooden one with the aid of the Japanese government.

== Allenby Bridge border crossing ==
Since the 1994 Israel–Jordan peace treaty, the Allenby Bridge Terminal has been operated by the Israel Airports Authority. It serves as a border crossing between the west and east banks of the Jordan River. The Jordanian authorities recognize the bridge as an international border entry point, but neither Jordan nor Israel grant entry visas to foreign passport holders at this crossing, unlike the country's other border crossings with territory under Israeli control, nor stamp the passports of departing travelers. Palestinians traveling abroad can use the Allenby Bridge to exit the West Bank into Jordan and then use the Queen Alia International Airport in Amman to fly abroad. Travel permits from both Israeli and Jordanian authorities are required, with varied stringency depending on the prevailing political situation.

Israeli citizens are not permitted to use the terminal, except Israeli Muslims making a pilgrimage to Mecca to perform the Hajj and Umrah. Such pilgrims were allowed to use the Allenby Bridge crossing for the first time in 1978, after Jordan and Saudi Arabia permitted Israeli Arabs to join the Hajj in 1977. Tourists who wish to travel to Jordan may have to be in possession of a visa from Jordan in advance, depending on their nationality. Tourists and inhabitants of East Jerusalem may travel directly to an Israeli terminal, although Palestinians from the West Bank have to start the departure procedure at the special Palestinian border terminal in Jericho city.

The Jordanian side of the bridge has a branch of the Bank of Jordan for the exchange of currencies.

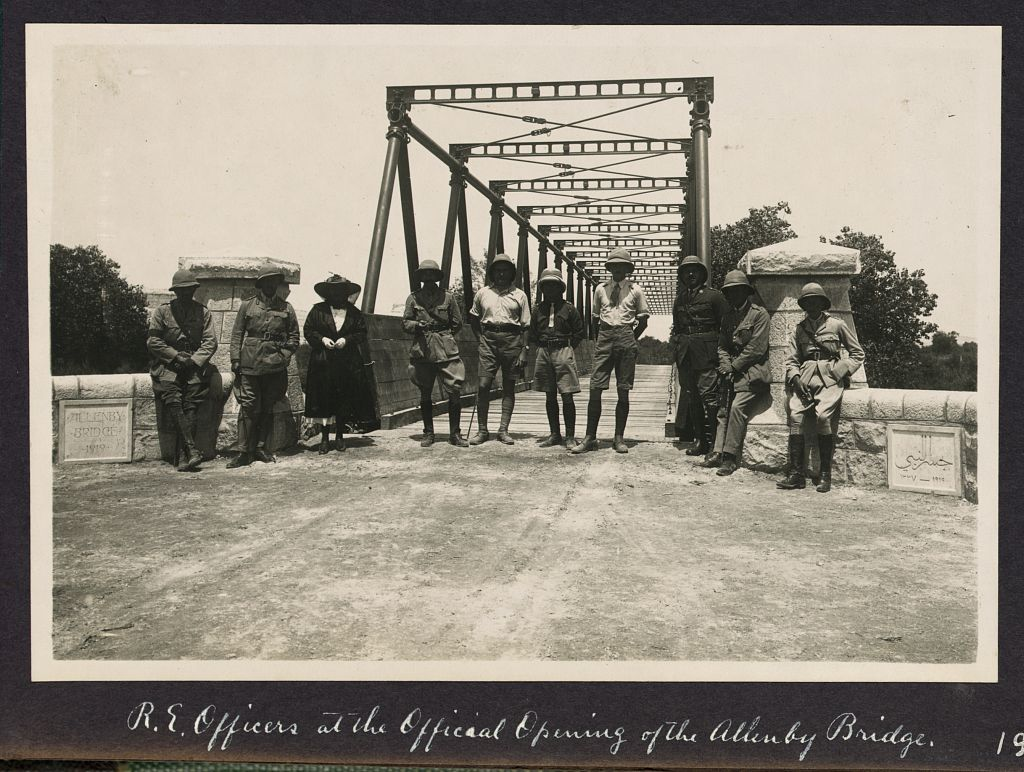
The opening of the original Allenby Bridge in 1918

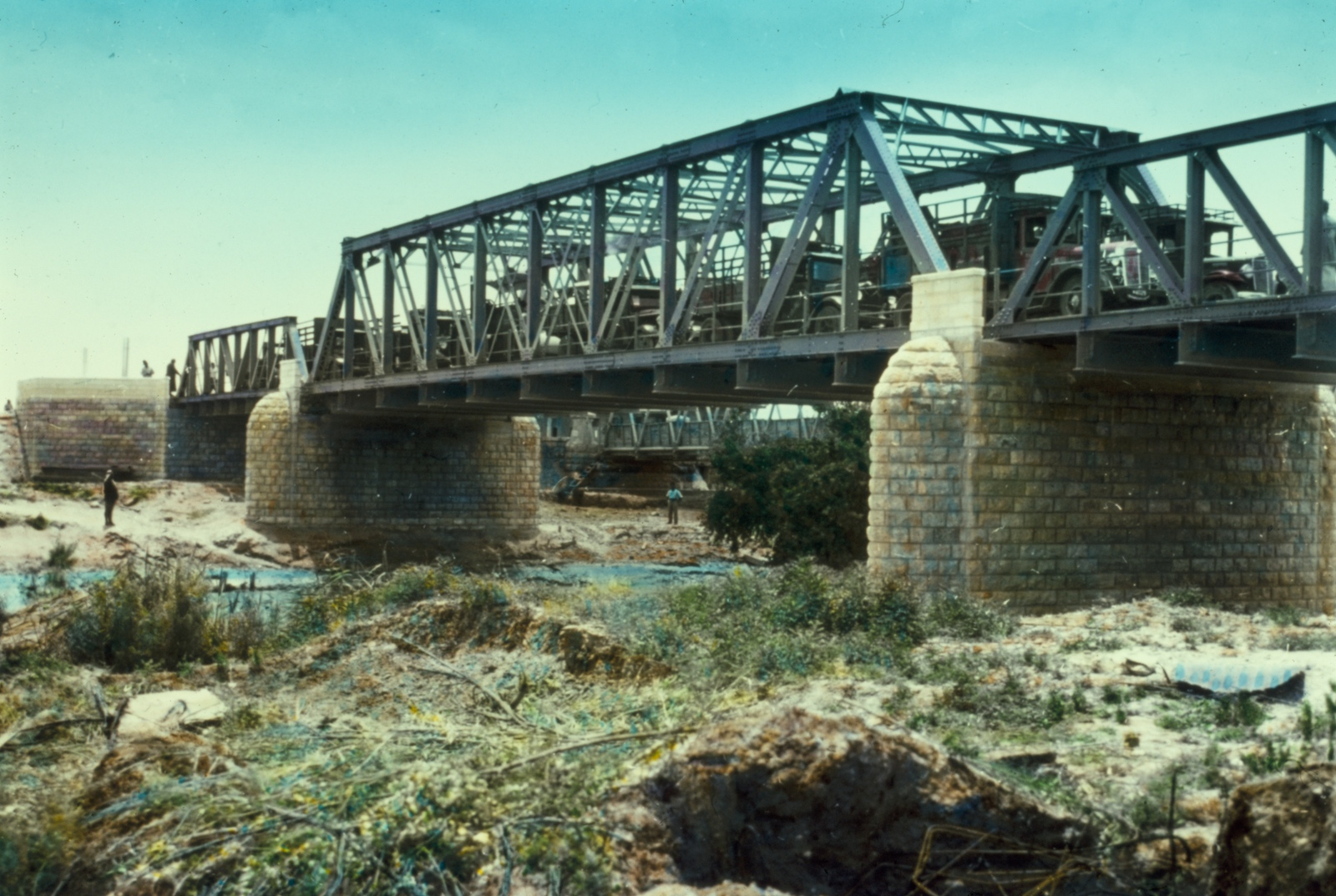
Larger bridge built in the 1930s next to the original one visible behind it

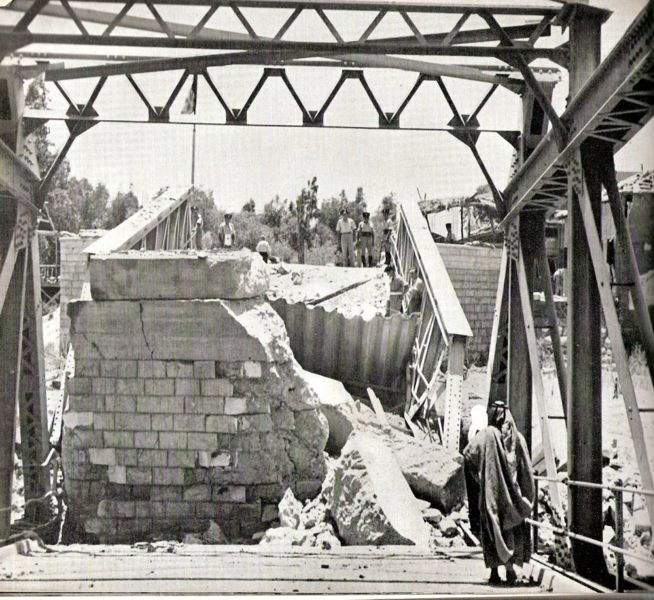
Allenby (King Hussein) Bridge after being blown up by the Palmach in 1946

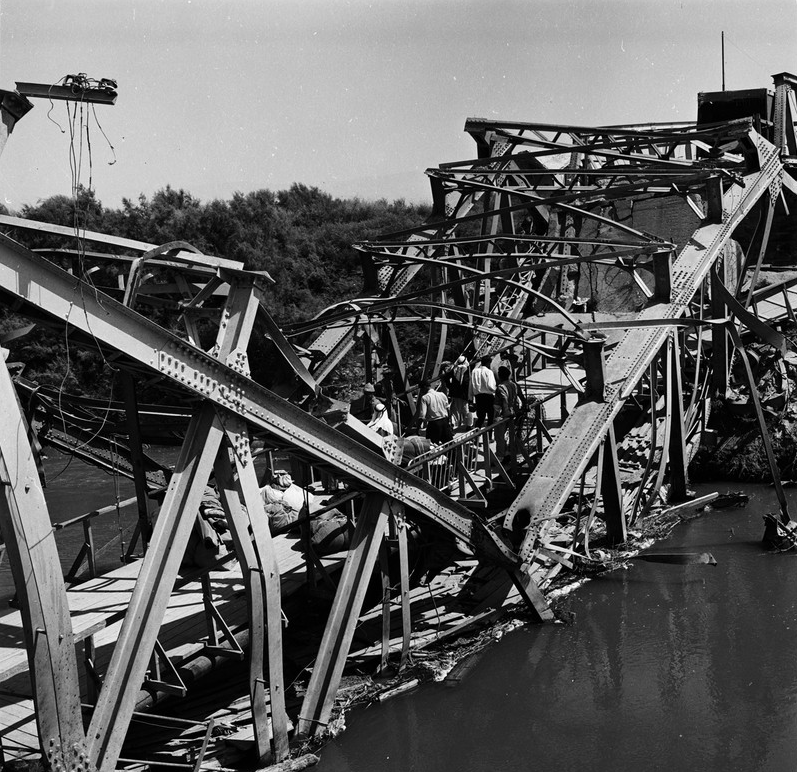
The bridge after being destroyed by Israel during the 1967 Six-Day War

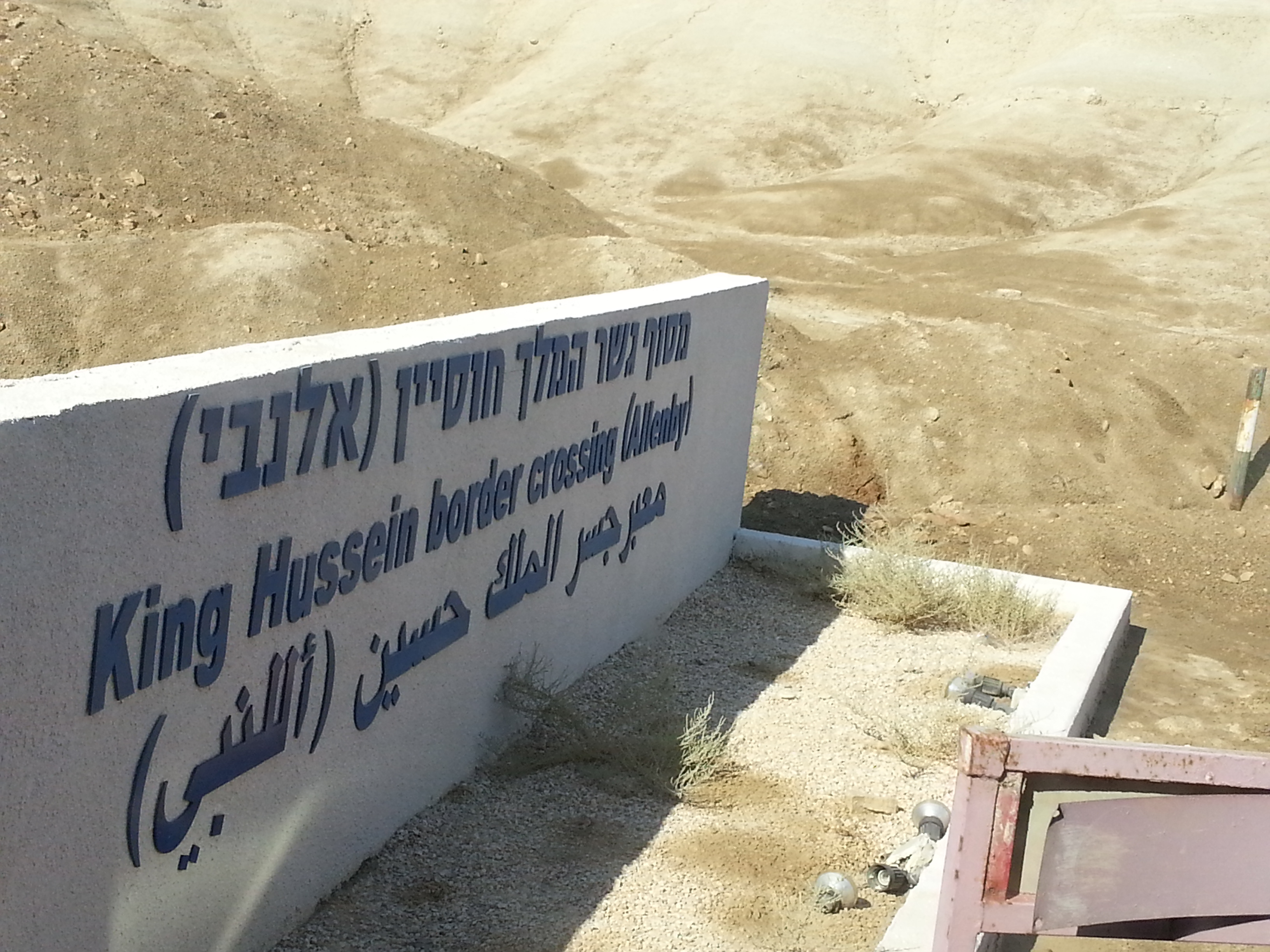
King Hussein Bridge inscription (western end), 2013

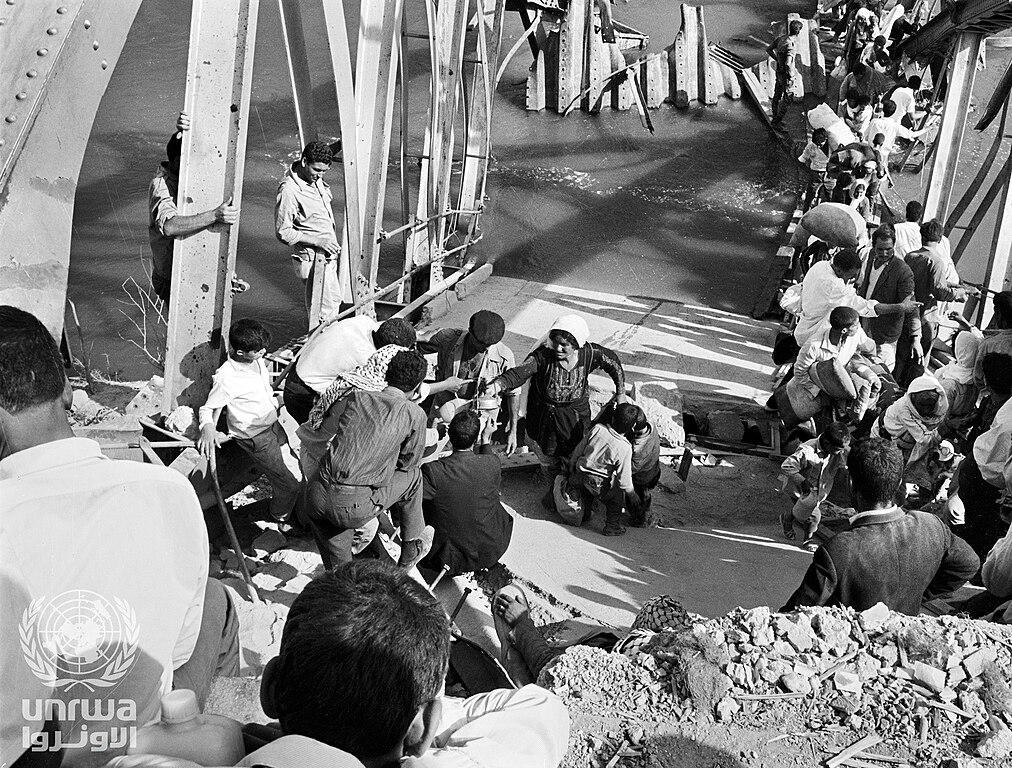
Palestine refugees flee across the Allenby Bridge during the second Arab-Israeli hostilities in 1967

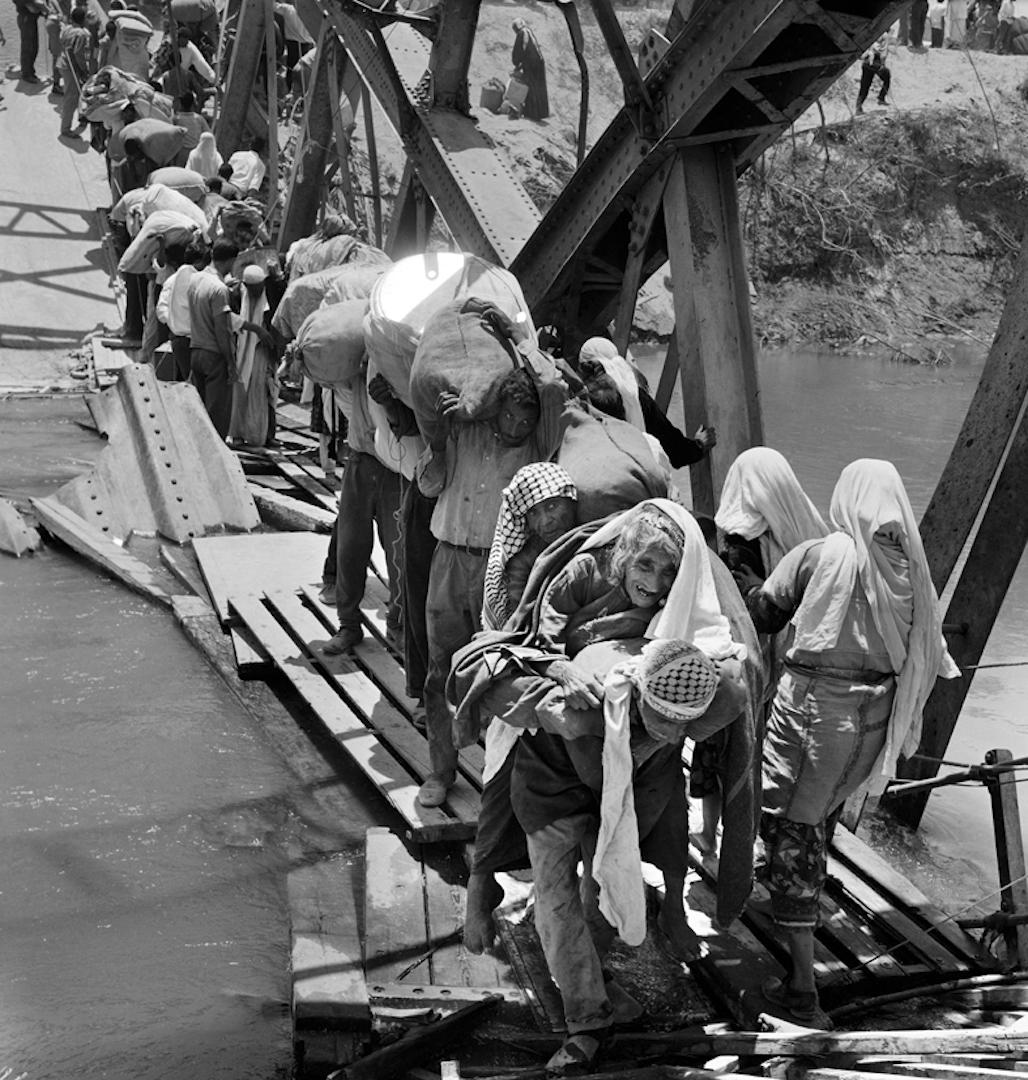
Palestine refugees flee across the Allenby Bridge during the second Arab-Israeli hostilities in 1967

== See also ==
- Death of Raed Zeiter
- Jisr ed-Damiye
- Israel-Jordan border
- 2024 Allenby Bridge shooting
