= Public Security Directorate =

Law enforcement agency of Jordan

Coordinates: 31.901309°N 35.876274°E

Public Security Directorate مديرية الأمن العام
- Official logo of the PSD
- Abbreviation: PSD

Agency overview
- Formed: January 1, 1956
- Preceding agency: Arab Legion
- Employees: 50,000 (2016 est.)
- Annual budget: $1 billion (2016 est.)

Jurisdictional structure
- National agency: Jordan
- Operations jurisdiction: Jordan
- Governing body: Government of Jordan
- General nature: Civilian police

Operational structure
- Headquarters: Amman
- Location of PSD headquarters
- Minister responsible: Sameer Mubaidin
- Agency executive: Fadel Al-Hmoud, Director General
- Parent agency: Ministry of Interior

Website
- www.psd.gov.jo

The Public Security Directorate (PSD; Arabic: مديرية الأمن العام) is the law enforcement agency of Jordan, which lies under the jurisdiction of the country's Ministry of Interior.

== Background ==
Jordan's law enforcement is under the purview of the Public Security Directorate (which includes approximately 40,000 persons). The Jordanian national police is subordinate to the Public Security Directorate of the Ministry of Interior. The first police force in the Jordanian state, was organized after the fall of the Ottoman Empire on 11 April 1921. Ali Khulqi Pasha Alsharairi was appointed as the first commander of the security force and as a National Security Counsellor (minister) in the first Transjordan government. The first security force was composed of the Gendarmerie Battalion, and the Gendarmerie regiment, the reservist regiment, the regulars, and the desert patrol force. Until 1956, police duties were carried out totally by the Arab Legion and the Transjordan Frontier Force. After the 1956 Arabization of the Jordanian Army command, the Public Security Directorate was established.

Jordan's law enforcement ranked 24th in the world and 4th in the Middle East, in terms of police services' reliability, in the Global Competitiveness Report. Jordan also ranked 13th in the world and 3rd in the Middle East in terms of prevention of organized crime.

The number of female police officers is on the rise in Jordan. In 1972, it was the first Arab state to introduce females to its police force. The number of police women grew from 6 in 1972 to over 3,500 in 2012.

The PSD established a police training center in Al-Muwaqqar which annually trains several thousands of police force members from neighboring Arab states, including; Palestine, Iraq and GCC countries. Another center established by Princess Basma specialized for training women, teaches the participants on details about the Jordanian penal code, the civil defence and public security laws and training on physical fitness, combat and defence skills.

PSD headquarters are located in Amman where they have a centralized system serving all areas in Jordan, designed to maintain public safety through the integration of modern equipment.

The current Director of the Public Security Directorate is Maj. Gen. Obaidallah Maaytah who was appointed on 11 September 2022.

== Gallery ==
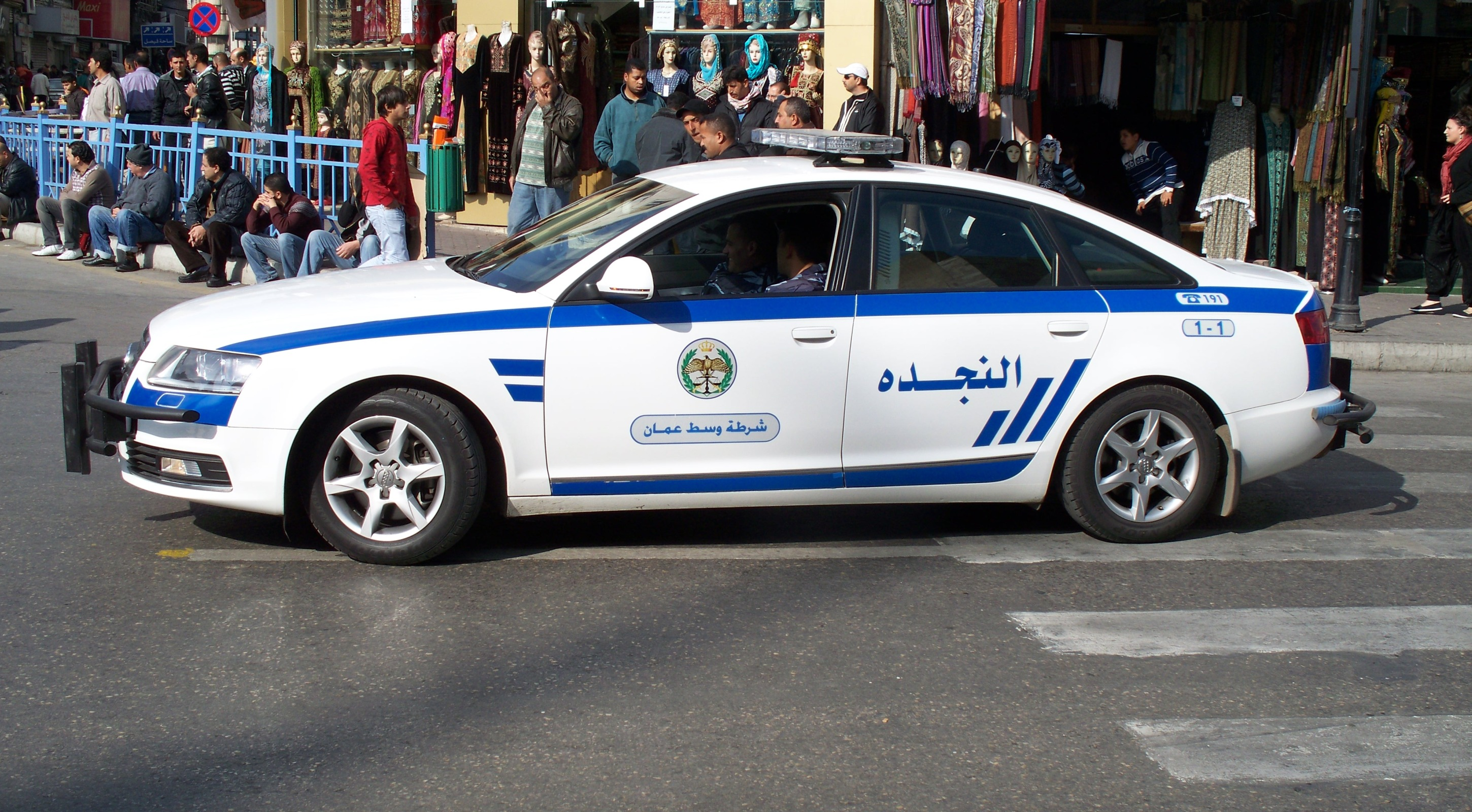
Jordanian Audi A6 city center police car

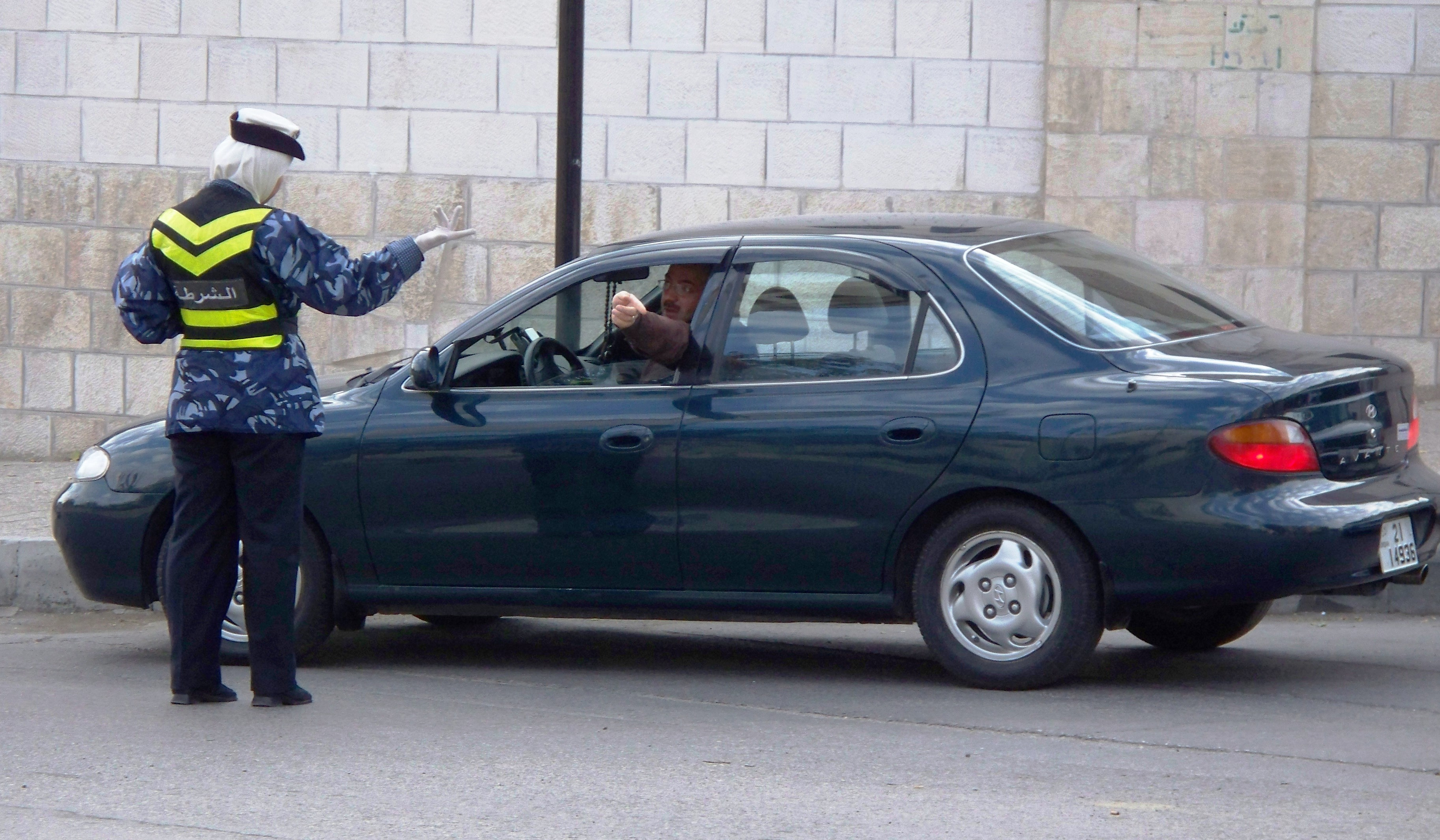
A female police officer in Amman
